= List of places in Powys (categorised) =

This is a categorised list of places in Powys, Wales.

== Administrative divisions ==
=== Electoral wards ===
- Abercraf
- Banwy
- Beguildy
- Berriew
- Blaen Hafren
- Bronllys
- Builth
- Bwlch
- Caersws
- Churchstoke
- Crickhowell
- Cwmtwrch
- Disserth and Trecoed
- Dolforwyn
- Felin-fach
- Forden
- Glantwymyn
- Glasbury
- Guilsfield
- Gwernyfed
- Hay
- Kerry
- Knighton
- Llanafanfawr
- Llanbadarn Fawr
- Llanbrynmair
- Llandinam
- Llandrindod East / Llandrindod West
- Llandrindod North
- Llandrindod South
- Llandrinio
- Llandysilio
- Llanelwedd
- Llanfair Caereinion
- Llanfechain
- Llanfihangel
- Llanfyllin
- Llangattock
- Llangors
- Llangunllo
- Llangynidr
- Llanidloes
- Llanrhaeadr-ym-Mochnant
- Llanrhaeadr-ym-Mochnant / Llansilin
- Llansantffraid
- Llanwddyn
- Llanwrtyd Wells
- Llanyre
- Machynlleth
- Maescar / Llywel
- Meifod
- Montgomery
- Nantmel
- Newtown Central
- Newtown East
- Newtown Llanllwchaiarn North
- Newtown Llanllwchaiarn West
- Newtown South
- Old Radnor
- Presteigne
- Rhayader
- Rhiwcynon
- St David Within
- St. John
- St. Mary
- Talgarth
- Talybont-on-Usk
- Tawe Uchaf
- Trewern
- Welshpool Castle
- Welshpool Gungrog
- Welshpool Llanerchyddol
- Ynyscedwyn
- Yscir
- Ystradgynlais

=== Communities ===
- Abbey Cwmhir
- Aberedw
- Aberhafesp
- Banwy
- Bausley with Criggion
- Beguildy
- Berriew
- Betws Cedewain
- Brecon
- Bronllys
- Builth
- Cadfarch
- Caersws
- Carno
- Carreghofa
- Castle Caereinion
- Churchstoke
- Cilmery
- Clyro
- Cray
- Crickhowell
- Disserth and Trecoed
- Duhonw
- Dwyriw
- Erwood
- Felin-fach
- Forden with Leighton and Trelystan
- Four Crosses
- Gladestry
- Glantwymyn
- Glasbury
- Glascwm
- Glyn Tarell
- Guilsfield
- Gwernyfed
- Hay-on-Wye
- Honddu Isaf
- Kerry
- Knighton
- Llanafan Fawr
- Llanbadarn Fawr
- Llanbadarn Fynydd
- Llanbister
- Llanbrynmair
- Llanddew
- Llanddewi Ystradenny
- Llandinam
- Llandrindod Wells
- Llandrinio
- Llandysilio
- Llandyssil
- Llanelwedd
- Llanerfyl
- Llanfair Caereinion
- Llanfechain
- Llanfihangel Nant Bran
- Llanfihangel Nant Melan
- Llanfihangel-yng-Ngwynfa
- Llanfihangel Cwmdu with Bwlch and Cathedine
- Llanfihangel Rhydithon
- Llanfilo
- Llanfrynach
- Llanfyllin
- Llangamarch
- Llangattock
- Llangedwyn
- Llangors
- Llangunllo
- Llangurig
- Llangynidr
- Llangyniew
- Llangynog
- Llanidloes
- Llanidloes Without
- Llanigon
- Llanrhaeadr-ym-Mochnant
- Llansantffraid
- Llansilin
- Llanwddyn
- Llanwrthwl
- Llanwrtyd Wells
- Llanyre
- Llywel
- Machynlleth
- Maescar
- Manafon
- Meifod
- Merthyr Cynog
- Mochdre
- Montgomery
- Nantmel
- New Radnor
- Newtown and Llanllwchaiarn
- Norton
- Old Radnor
- Painscastle
- Penybont
- Pen-y-Bont-Fawr
- Presteigne
- Rhayader
- St. Harmon
- Talgarth
- Talybont-on-Usk
- Tawe Uchaf
- The Vale of Grwyney
- Trallong
- Trefeglwys
- Treflys
- Tregynon
- Trewern
- Welshpool
- Whitton
- Yscir
- Ystradfellte
- Ystradgynlais

== Notable places ==
=== Principal towns ===
- Brecon
- Builth Wells
- Llandrindod Wells
- Newtown
- Presteigne

=== Archaeological sites ===
- Brecon Caer Roman Fort
- Tretower Castle
- Dolforwyn Castle
- Aberedw Castle

== Geographical ==
=== Geographical regions ===
- Black Mountains
- Brecon Beacons National Park
- Cambrian Mountains
- Elan Valley
- Radnor Forest

=== Cave systems ===
- Ogof Draenen
- Ogof Ffynnon Ddu
- Agen Allwedd
- Ogof y Daren Cilau
- Ogof Craig a Ffynnon

=== Lakes and reservoirs ===
- Elan Valley Reservoirs
- Claerwen Reservoir
- Craig-goch Reservoir
- Penygarreg Reservoir
- Garreg-ddu Reservoir
- Caban-coch Reservoir
- Talybont Reservoir
- Lake Vyrnwy

=== Rivers and waterways ===
- Afon Claerwen
- Afon Elan
- Afon Irfon
- Afon Llynfi
- Afon Marteg
- Clywedog Brook
- River Ithon
- River Lugg
- River Loughor
- River Severn
- River Tywi
- River Usk
- River Vyrnwy
- River Wye

== Transport ==
=== Major roads ===
- A40 road
- A44 road
- A470 road
- A483 road
- A489 road

=== Railway lines ===
- Heart of Wales Line
- Welshpool and Llanfair Light Railway

=== Railway stations ===
- Sugar Loaf railway station
- Llanwrtyd railway station
- Llangammarch railway station
- Garth railway station
- Cilmeri railway station
- Builth Road railway station
- Llandrindod railway station
- Pen-y-Bont railway station
- Dolau railway station
- Llanbister Road railway station
- Llangynllo railway station
- Knighton railway station
- Newtown railway station
- Caersws
- Welshpool
- Machynlleth

=== Cycle routes ===
Powys has a number of designated cycle routes which are part of the National Cycle Network.

- Taff Trail
- Lake Vyrnwy road circuit
- Lôn Las Cymru
- Lon Cambria
- Radnor Ring
- Elan Valley Trail
- Celtic Trail, incorporating, within Powys:
  - National Cycle Route 42
  - National Cycle Route 43 (not yet completed)

Proposed routes include:

- National Cycle Route 83
- National Cycle Route 85
- National Cycle Route 49
- National Cycle Route 819

=== Footpaths ===
- Glyndŵr's Way
- Offa's Dyke Path
- Wye Valley Walk

== Cultural venues ==
=== Sport ===
Sports stadiums with seating capacity

- Recreation Ground (Caersws) (3,500)
- Latham Park, Newtown (5,000)
- Maes y Dre Recreation Ground, Welshpool (3,000)
- Recreation Ground, Llansantffraid-ym-Mechain (2,000)
- Y Weirglodd, Rhayader (2,000)

=== Historical venues ===
- Gregynog, hosts an annual music festival

== See also ==
- List of places in Powys for a list of towns and villages
