= List of electoral wards in Powys =

Pre-2022 county wards of Powys, Wales

This list of electoral wards in Powys includes council wards, which elect councillors to Powys County Council and community wards, which elect councillors to community councils.

Powys is administered by Powys County Council and has 68 (73 until 2022) elected councillors representing 60 (73 until 2022) council wards. Although it is a unitary authority, the highway functions of the council, along with the allocation of small grants, are delegated to the three Shire Committees.

Local elections take place every five years. Some of the electoral wards are coterminous with communities (civil parishes) of the same name. There are 112 communities in the principal area. Nearly all communities have a local community council.

== 2022 ward changes ==
In 2021 a large number of proposals by the Local Democracy and Boundary Commission for Wales, to reduce the number of wards in Powys from 73 to 60, with the number of councillors dropping from 73 to 68. As a result of ward mergers, some of the new wards would become multi-member.

Twenty six ward boundaries would be unaffected: Builth, Caersws, Churchstoke, Cwm-twrch, Dolforwyn, Glantwymyn, Gwernyfed, Hay, Llandrindod North, Llandrinio, Llandysilio, Llanfyllin, Llanrhaeadr-ymMochnant/Llansilin, Llansantffraid, Machynlleth, Maescar/Llywel, Newtown East, Newtown Llanllwchaiarn North, Newtown Llanllwchaiarn West, Old Radnor, Rhayader, Rhiwcynon, Talgarth, Talybont-on-Usk, Tawe-Uchaf, Ynyscedwyn.

Eight multi-member wards were created, electing two councillors each.

== Post-2022 wards ==
The following table lists the post-2022 county/community wards, the numbers of councillors elected and the communities they cover.

=== Montgomeryshire (North Powys) ===
Montgomeryshire has 29 wards electing 31 county councillors.

County ward	County councillors	Communities	Community wards	Community councillors
Banwy, Llanfihangel and Llanwddyn	1	Banwy *; Llanfihangel-yng-Ngwynfa *; Llangynog *; Llanwddyn *; Pen-y-Bont-Fawr *		7; 7; 7
Berriew and Castle Caereinion	1	Berriew *; Castle Caereinion *	Berriew	11
Caersws	1	Caersws *; Carno *	Caersws; Carno	6
Churchstoke ^{c}	1	Churchstoke *	Churchstoke; Hyssington	9; 3
Dolforwyn	1	Abermule with Llandyssil *; Bettws *		
Forden and Montgomery	1	Forden, Leighton and Trelystan * (part)	Forden	7
Forden and Montgomery	1	Montgomery *	Montgomery	8
Glantwymyn	1	Glantwymyn *	Ceinws; Cemmaes; Darowen; Llanwrin	3; 5; 4; 3
Glantwymyn	1	Cadfarch *		
Guilsfield ^{c}	1	Guilsfield *		
Kerry	1	Kerry *	Kerry; Sarn	
Llanbrynmair	1	Llanbrynmair *	Bontdolgadfan; Wynnstay	4; 6
Llanbrynmair	1	Llanidloes Without *; Trefeglwys *		
Llandinam and Dolfor	1	Kerry (part); Llandinam *; Mochdre *	Dolfor	
Llandrinio	1	Bausley with Criggion *; Llandrinio *		
Llandysilio	1	Carreghofa *; Llandysilio *		
Llanfair Caereinion and Llanerfyl	1	Llanfair Caereinion *; Llanerfyl *		
Llanfyllin ^{c}	1	Llanfyllin *		12
Llangyniew and Meifod	1	Llangyniew *		
Llangyniew and Meifod	1	Meifod *	Meifod	11
Llanidloes	2	Llanidloes *; Llangurig *		
Llanrhaeadr-ym-Mochnant/ Llansilin	1	Llangedwyn *; Llanrhaeadr-ym-Mochnant *; Llansilin *		
Llansantffraid	1	Llanfechain *; Llansantffraid *		
Machynlleth ^{c}	1	Machynlleth *	Machynlleth	12
Newtown Central and South	2	Newtown and Llanllwchaiarn * (part)	Newtown Central; Newtown South	4; 3
Newtown East	1	Newtown and Llanllwchaiarn * (part)	Newtown East	3
Newtown North	1	Newtown and Llanllwchaiarn * (part)	Llanllwchaiarn North	3
Newtown West	1	Newtown and Llanllwchaiarn * (part)	Llanllwchaiarn West	3
Rhiwcynon	1	Aberhafesp *		
Rhiwcynon	1	Dwyriw *	Llanwyddelan; Llanllugan	4; 4
Rhiwcynon	1	Manafon *		
Rhiwcynon	1	Tregynon *		
Trelystan and Trewern	1	Forden, Leighton and Trelystan * (part)	Trelystan	3
Trelystan and Trewern	1	Trewern *		10
Welshpool Castle	1	Welshpool * (part)	Castle	4
Welshpool Gungrog	1	Welshpool * (part)	Gungrog	6
Welshpool Llanerchyddol	1	Welshpool * (part)	Llanerchyddol	6

=== Radnorshire (Mid Powys) ===
Radnorshire area has 12 wards electing 14 county councillors.

County ward	County councillors	Communities	Community wards	Community councillors
Disserth and Trecoed with Newbridge	1	Disserth and Trecoed *		7
Disserth and Trecoed with Newbridge	1	Llanyre * (part)	Newbridge	
Glasbury	1	Clyro *		10
Glasbury	1	Glasbury *	Boughrood; Glasbury	5; 5
Knighton and Beguildy	2	Beguildy *		
Knighton and Beguildy	2	Knighton *	Knighton Central; Knighton Outer; Knighton South East; Knighton West	3; 2; 5; 4
Ithon Valley	1	Llanbadarn Fawr *; Llanbadarn Fynydd; Llanbister *; Llanddewi Ystradenny *; Pen-y-bont and Llandegley *		
Llandrindod North	1	Llandrindod Wells * (part)	North	5
Llandrindod South	2	Llandrindod Wells * (part)	East; South 1 South 2 West	2; 2; 4; 2
Llanelwedd	1	Aberedw *; Glascwm *; Llanelwedd *		
Llanelwedd	1	Painscastle *		8
Llangunllo with Norton	1	Llanfihangel Rhydithon *		
Llangunllo with Norton	1	Llangunllo *		7
Llangunllo with Norton	1	Presteigne * (part)	Norton	
Llangunllo with Norton	1	Whitton *		8
Llanyre and Nantmel	1	Llanyre * (part)		
Llanyre and Nantmel	1	Abbeycwmhir *; Nantmel *; St. Harmon *		
Old Radnor	1	Gladestry *; New Radnor *		
Old Radnor	1	Old Radnor *	Kinnerton/Evenjobb; Old Radnor/Walton	5; 6
Presteigne	1	Presteigne * (part)	Presteigne Town	
Rhayader ^{c}	1	Rhayader *		

=== Brecknockshire (South Powys) ===
Brecknockshire area has 19 wards electing 23 county councillors.

County ward	County councillors	Communities	Community wards	Community councillors
Aber-craf and Ystradgynlais	2	Ystradgynlais * (part)	Abercraf; Ystradgynlais	4; 4
Brecon East	2	Brecon * (part)	St John's East; St Mary's	3; 5
Brecon West	2	Brecon * (part)	St David's; St John's West	3; 4
Bronllys and Felin-fach	1	Bronllys *; Erwood *; Felin-fach		
Builth	1	Builth Wells *		12
Crickhowell with Cwmdu and Tretower	2	Crickhowell *		12
Crickhowell with Cwmdu and Tretower	2	Cwmdu and District *	Cwmdu; Tretower	
Crickhowell with Cwmdu and Tretower	2	Vale of Grwyney *	Llanbedr; Llangenny & Glangrwyney	4; 5
Cwm-twrch	1	Ystradgynlais * (part)	Cwmtwrch	4
Gwernyfed	1	Gwernyfed *; Llanigon *		10
Hay ^{c}	1	Hay *	Hay	11
Llanafanfawr with Garth	1	Cilmeri *; Duhonw *; Llanafan-fawr *; Llanwrthwl *		
Llanafanfawr with Garth	1	Treflys * (part)	Garth	
Llangattock and Llangynidr	1	Llangattock *		10
Llangattock and Llangynidr	1	Llangynidr *		
Llangors with Bwlch	1	Llangors *	Llangors; Llanfihangel Talyllyn	5; 5
Llangors with Bwlch	1	Cwmdu and District * (part)	Bwlch	
Llanwrtyd Wells	1	Llangamarch *; Llanwrtyd Wells *		
Llanwrtyd Wells	1	Treflys * (part)	Beulah	
Maescar/Llywel	1	Cray *		
Maescar/Llywel	1	Llywel *		
Maescar/Llywel	1	Maescar *	Pontsenni; Senni; Ysclydach	6; 2; 3
Talgarth ^{c}	1	Talgarth *		12
Talybont-on-Usk	1	Glyn Tarell *; Llanfrynach *; Talybont-on-Usk *		
Tawe Uchaf	1	Tawe Uchaf *	Ynyswen Penycae; Caehopkin; Coelbren	5; 3; 5
Tawe Uchaf	1	Ystradfellte *		
Ynyscedwyn	1	Ystradgynlais * (part)	Ynyscedwyn	4
Yscir with Honddu Isaf and Llanddew	1	Honddu Isaf *; Llanddew *; Merthyr Cynog *; Trallong *; Yscir *		

* = Communities which elect a community council
^{c} = Ward coterminous with community of the same name

== Pre-2022 wards ==
The following table lists the pre-2022 county/community wards, the numbers of councillors elected and the communities they cover.

Brecknockshire had 24 councillors, Radnorshire had 15 and Montgomeryshire had 34.

=== Montgomeryshire (North Powys) ===
County ward	County councillors	Communities	Community wards
Banwy	1	Banwy *; Llanerfyl *	
Berriew ^{c}	1	Berriew *	Berriew
Blaen Hafren	1	Llangurig *; Llanidloes Without *; Trefeglwys *	
Caersws	1	Caersws *; Carno *	Caersws; Carno
Churchstoke ^{c}	1	Churchstoke *	Churchstoke; Hyssington
Dolforwyn	1	Abermule with Llandyssil *; Bettws *	
Forden	1	Forden, Leighton and Trelystan *	Forden; Trelystan
Glantwymyn	1	Cadfarch *	
Glantwymyn	1	Glantwymyn *	Ceinws; Cemmaes; Darowen; Llanwrin
Guilsfield	1	Castle Caereinion *; Guilsfield *	
Kerry ^{c}	1	Kerry *	
Llanbrynmair ^{c}	1	Llanbrynmair *	Bontdolgadfan; Wynnstay
Llandinam	1	Llandinam *; Mochdre *	
Llandrinio	1	Bausley with Criggion *; Llandrinio *	
Llandysilio	1	Carreghofa *; Llandysilio *	
Llanfair Caereinion ^{c}	1	Llanfair Caereinion *	
Llanfihangel	1	Llanfihangel-yng-Ngwynfa *; Llangyniew *	
Llanfyllin ^{c}	1	Llanfyllin *	
Llanidloes ^{c}	1	Llanidloes *	
Llanrhaeadr-ym-Mochnant/ Llansilin	1	Llangedwyn *; Llanrhaeadr-ym-Mochnant *; Llansilin *	
Llansantffraid	1	Llanfechain *; Llansantffraid *	
Llanwddyn	1	Llangynog *; Llanwddyn *; Pen-y-Bont-Fawr *	
Machynlleth ^{c}	1	Machynlleth *	Machynlleth
Meifod ^{c}	1	Meifod *	Meifod
Montgomery ^{c}	1	Montgomery *	Montgomery
Newtown Central	1	Newtown and Llanllwchaiarn * (part)	Newtown Central
Newtown East	1	Newtown and Llanllwchaiarn * (part)	Newtown East
Newtown Llanllwchaiarn; North	1	Newtown and Llanllwchaiarn * (part)	Llanllwchaiarn North
Newtown Llanllwchaiarn; West	1	Newtown and Llanllwchaiarn * (part)	Llanllwchaiarn West
Newtown South	1	Newtown and Llanllwchaiarn * (part)	Newtown South
Rhiwcynon	1	Aberhafesp *	
Rhiwcynon	1	Dwyriw *	Llanwyddelan; Llanllugan
Rhiwcynon	1	Manafon *	
Rhiwcynon	1	Tregynon *	
Trewern ^{c}	1	Trewern *	
Welshpool Castle	1	Welshpool * (part)	Castle
Welshpool Gungrog	1	Welshpool * (part)	Gungrog
Welshpool Llanerchyddol	1	Welshpool * (part)	Llanerchyddol

=== Radnorshire (Mid Powys) ===
County ward	County councillors	Communities	Community wards
Beguildy	1	Beguildy *; Llanbadarn Fynydd; Llanbister *	
Disserth and Trecoed ^{c}	1	Disserth and Trecoed *	
Glasbury	1	Clyro *	
Glasbury	1	Glasbury *	Boughrood; Glasbury
Glasbury	1	Painscastle *	
Knighton ^{c}	1	Knighton *	Knighton Central; Knighton Outer; Knighton South East; Knighton West
Llanbadarn Fawr	1	Llanbadarn Fawr *; Pen-y-bont and Llandegley *	
Llandrindod East/West	Llandrindod Wells * (part)	East; West	
Llandrindod North	1	Llandrindod Wells * (part)	North
Llandrindod South	1	Llandrindod Wells * (part)	South 1 South 2
Llanelwedd	1	Aberedw *; Glascwm *; Llanelwedd *	
Llangunllo	1	Llanddewi Ystradenny *; Llanfihangel Rhydithon *; Llangunllo *; Whitton *	
Llanyre ^{c}	1	Llanyre *	
Nantmel	1	Abbeycwmhir *; Nantmel *; St. Harmon *	
Old Radnor	1	Gladestry *; New Radnor *; Old Radnor	
Presteigne ^{c}	1	Presteigne *	
Rhayader ^{c}	1	Rhayader *	

=== Brecknockshire (South Powys) ===
County ward	County councillors	Communities	Community wards
Aber-craf	1	Ystradgynlais * (part)	Abercraf
Bronllys	1	Bronllys *; Erwood *	
Builth	1	Builth Wells *	
Bwlch	1	Llanfihangel Cwmdu with Bwlch and Cathedine *	
Crickhowell	1	Crickhowell *	
Crickhowell	1	Vale of Grwyney *	Llanbedr; Llangenny & Glangrwyney
Cwm-twrch	1	Ystradgynlais * (part)	Cwmtwrch
Felin-fach	1	Felinfach *; Honddu Isaf *; Llanddew *	
Gwernyfed	1	Gwernyfed *; Llanigon *	
Hay ^{c}	1	Hay *	Hay
Llanafanfawr	1	Cilmeri *; Duhonw *; Llanafan-fawr *; Llanwrthwl *	
Llangattock ^{c}	1	Llangattock *	
Llangors ^{c}	1	Llangors *	Llangors; Llanfihangel Talyllyn
Llangynidr ^{c}	1	Llangynidr *	
Llanwrtyd Wells	1	Llangamarch *; Llanwrtyd Wells *; Treflys *	
Maescar/Llywel	1	Cray *	
Maescar/Llywel	1	Llywel *	
Maescar/Llywel	1	Maescar *	Pontsenni; Senni; Ysclydach
St David Within	1	Brecon * (part)	St David's
St John	1	Brecon * (part)	St John's East; St John's West
St Mary	1	Brecon * (part)	St Mary's
Talgarth ^{c}	1	Talgarth *	
Talybont-on-Usk	1	Glyn Tarell *; Llanfrynach *; Talybont-on-Usk *	
Tawe Uchaf	1	Tawe Uchaf *	Ynyswen Penycae; Caehopkin; Coelbren
Tawe Uchaf	1	Ystradfellte *	
Ynyscedwyn	1	Ystradgynlais * (part)	Ynyscedwyn
Yscir	1	Merthyr Cynog *; Trallong *; Yscir *	
Ystradgynlais	1	Ystradgynlais * (part)	Ystradgynlais

* = Communities which elect a community council
^{c} = Ward coterminous with community of the same name

== See also ==
- List of electoral wards in Wales
- List of places in Powys (categorised)

== Sources ==
- Election Maps, Ordnance Survey. Retrieved 21 January 2018.
- Town and Community Councils, Powys County Council. Retrieved 21 January 2018.
- Your Councillors by Ward, Powys County Council. Retrieved 21 January 2018.
