= Newtown West (Powys electoral ward) =

Coordinates: 52.5247°N 3.3292°W

Newtown West: Welsh: Gorllewin y Drenewydd
- Electoral ward
- Location within Powys
- Population: 1,844 (2011 census)
- Principal area: Powys
- Country: Wales
- Sovereign state: United Kingdom
- Post town: NEWTOWN
- Postcode district: SY16
- Dialling code: 01686
- UK Parliament: Montgomeryshire and Glyndŵr
- Senedd Cymru – Welsh Parliament: Montgomeryshire
- Councillors: 1 (County); 3 (Town Council)

Newtown West (formerly Newtown Llanllwchaiarn West or Llanllwchaiarn West) is an electoral ward in the community of Newtown and Llanllwchaiarn, Powys, Wales.

== Description ==
Newtown West covers the largely rural northwest quadrant of the community north of the River Severn. It includes part of the Pengloddfa district of Newtown. The Newtown North ward (including the village of Llanllwchaiarn) lies to the east and Newtown Central and South borders to the south of the river. The Rhiwcynon and Llandinam and Dolfor wards border to the west.

The ward elected two councillors to Montgomeryshire District Council and Powys County Council, but since the May 1999 election it has elected one county councillor to Powys County Council. It is also a community ward and is represented by three town councillors on Newtown and Llanllwchaiarn Town Council.

According to the 2011 UK Census the population of the ward was 1,844.

Effective from the 2022 local elections, Newtown Llanllwchaiarn West was renamed as Newtown West (Welsh: Gorllewin y Drenewydd), though retaining the same borders and county council representation.

== County Council elections ==
At the May 2017 Powys County Council elections four of the five sitting councillors in Newtown and Llanllwchaiarn stood down, with Llanllwchaiarn West being won from the Independents by a Conservative Party candidate, one of many Tory gains across Powys. The Conservatives then retained the seat at the May 2022 Powys County Council elections.

The ward had been represented by Independent councillors from 1995 until the 2012 elections.

== Town Council elections ==
Llanllwchaiarn West is the name of the community ward for Newtown and Llanllwchaiarn Town Council. At the May 2017 town council elections only the Llanllwchaiarn West ward held a contest, with four candidates competing for the three seats.

== See also ==
- List of electoral wards in Powys
