= Welshpool Llanerchyddol =

Electoral ward in Powys, Wales

Coordinates: 52.6597°N 3.1763°W

- Electoral ward
- Location within Powys
- Population: 2,300 (2011 census)
- Principal area: Powys
- Country: Wales
- Sovereign state: United Kingdom
- Post town: WELSHPOOL
- Postcode district: SY21
- Dialling code: 01938
- UK Parliament: Montgomeryshire and Glyndŵr
- Senedd Cymru – Welsh Parliament: Montgomeryshire
- Councillors: 1 (County); 6 (Town Council)

Welshpool Llanerchyddol (usually referred to as Llanerchyddol) is the name of an electoral ward in the town of Welshpool, Powys, Wales. It elects a councillor to Powys County Council.

== Description ==
The Llanerchyddol ward covers the area of the town to the west of Welshpool town centre and the smaller rural settlements of Llanerchydol, Groespluan and Frochas. Llanerchyddol is divided from the Welshpool Castle ward by the A458 road, is bordered to the east by Welshpool Gungrog and to the north and west by Guilsfield.

The ward elected two councillors to Montgomeryshire District Council and Powys County Council, but since the May 1999 election it has elected one county councillor to Powys County Council. It is also a community ward and is represented by up to six town councillors on Welshpool Town Council.

According to the 2011 UK Census the population of the ward was 2,300.

== County elections ==
Independent county councillor Graham Breeze (former editor of the Powys County Times) won his seat at a by-election In December 2016. This followed the death of the previous councillor, Ann Holloway. Cllr Breeze successfully defended his seat at the May 2017 and May 2022 Powys County Council elections.

Cllr Holloway had been Powys county councillor for the ward continually since 1995.

== See also ==
- List of electoral wards in Powys
