= Llangunllo with Norton =

Electoral ward in Powys, Wales

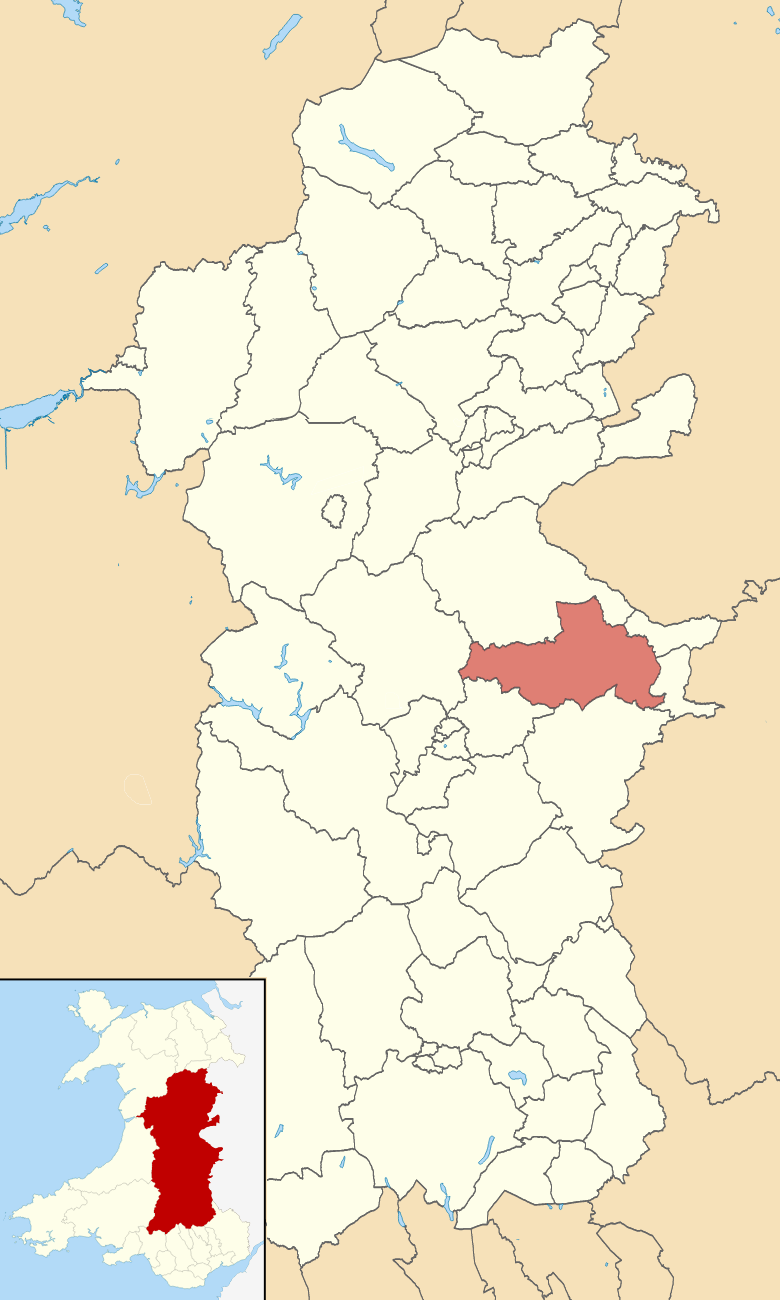
Pre-2022 Llangunllo ward location in Powys, Wales

Llangunllo with Norton (Welsh: Llangynllo gyda Norton), formerly known as Llangunllo, is an electoral ward in central Powys, Wales. It covers the community of Llangunllo as well as the neighbouring communities of Llanfihangel Rhydithon and Whitton with the village of Norton. The ward elects a county councillor to Powys County Council.

According to the 2011 census the population of the ward was 1,255.

Following a boundary review the Llangunllo ward was renamed Llangunllo with Norton, with the addition of the village of Norton from the neighbouring Presteigne ward. The community of Llanddewi Ystradenny was removed to form part of a new Ithon Valley ward.

== County councillors ==
Between 1995 and 2012 the seat was held by non-party Independent councillors, with the electorate only casting their votes in the 1995 and 2004 elections (when there were more than one candidate). At the May 2017 election Llangunllo faced a contest between the Welsh Conservative Party and Independent candidate, Hywel Lewis, with Lewis retaining his seat with just short of 60% of the vote.

2017 Powys County Council election
Party	Candidate	Votes	%	±%
Independent	Hywel LEWIS *	350	59.7	N/A
Conservative	Edmund Richard HAYWARD	230	39.2	

* = sitting councillor prior to the election

== See also ==
- List of electoral wards in Powys
