= Llanllwchaiarn =

Village in Powys, Wales

Coordinates: 52.5198°N 3.3172°W

Llanllwchaiarn: Welsh: Llanllwchaearn
- Location within Powys
- Population: 848 (2011)
- OS grid reference: SO107921
- Community: Newtown and Llanllwchaiarn
- Principal area: Powys
- Preserved county: Powys
- Country: Wales
- Sovereign state: United Kingdom
- Post town: NEWTOWN
- Postcode district: SY16
- Dialling code: 01686
- Police: Dyfed-Powys
- Fire: Mid and West Wales
- Ambulance: Welsh
- UK Parliament: Montgomeryshire and Glyndŵr
- Senedd Cymru – Welsh Parliament: Montgomeryshire

Llanllwchaiarn (Welsh: Llanllwchaearn; Welsh pronunciation: [ɬanɬuː′χaɨarn]) is a village on the outskirts of Newtown in Powys, Wales. It forms part of the community of Newtown and Llanllwchaiarn.

Aberbechan Hall was a Tudor mansion in the eastern part of the parish demolished in 1870.

The wards of Llanllwchaiarn North and Llanllwchaiarn West elect up to four councillors to Newtown and Llanllwchaiarn Town Council.

== Literature ==
- Oliver H. N, (2000), Llanllwchaiarn: Church and Parish, Newtown.

== Notable people ==
- Thomas Blayney, harpist

== See also ==
- St Llwchaiarn's Church, Llanllwchaiarn
