= Newtown Central =

Coordinates: 52.5084°N 3.3307°W

- Electoral ward
- Location within Powys
- Population: 3,278 (2011 census)
- Principal area: Powys
- Country: Wales
- Sovereign state: United Kingdom
- Post town: NEWTOWN
- Postcode district: SY16
- Dialling code: 01686
- UK Parliament: Montgomeryshire and Glyndŵr
- Senedd Cymru – Welsh Parliament: Montgomeryshire
- Councillors: 1 (County); 3 (Town Council)

Newtown Central was the name of a county electoral ward in the town of Newtown, Powys, Wales. It remains as a community ward to Newtown and Llanllwchaiarn Town Council.

== Description ==
Newtown Central ward covered the area west of Newtown town centre and immediately south of the River Severn.

The ward elected two councillors to Montgomeryshire District Council and Powys County Council, but since the May 1999 election it elected one county councillor to Powys County Council.

Newtown Central is a community ward and is represented by three town councillors on Newtown and Llanllwchaiarn Town Council.

According to the 2011 UK Census the population of the ward was 3,278.

Effective from the 2022 local elections, Newtown Central was merged with Newtown South to become Newtown Central and South, which elected two councillors to Powys County Council.

== County elections ==
From 1995 the ward had been represented by Plaid Cymru and Independent councillors, though in 2008 it was taken by the Conservatives (who retained the seat in 2012).

At the May 2017 Powys County Council elections four of the five sitting councillors in Newtown and Llanllwchaiarn stood down, with Newtown Central being won from the Conservative Party by a Liberal Democrat, David Selby, bucking the county trend. The Liberal Democrats then retained the seats at the May 2022 Powys County Council elections.

== See also ==
- List of electoral wards in Powys
