= Thomas Blayney =

Welsh harpist

Thomas Blayney (1785 – unknown) was a Welsh harpist. He was born in Llanllwchaiarn, Montgomeryshire. His brother, Arthur Blayney was a well-known violinist. Thomas was appointed family harpist to the household of Lord Powis in 1829, but died shortly after his appointment to the position, although the exact year of his death is not known.
