= 2017 Powys County Council election =

2017 Welsh local government election

- 4 May 2017

All 72 seats to Powys County Council 36 seats needed for a majority
| | First party | Second party | Third party |
|---|---|---|---|
| Leader | Rosemarie Harris | Aled Davies | James Gibson-Watt |
| Party | Independents | Conservative | Liberal Democrats |
| Leader's seat | Llangynidr | Llanrhaeadr-ym-Mochnant/Llansilin | Glasbury |
| Last election | 48 seats, 51.9% | 10 seats, 18.8% | 9 seats, 19.1% |
| Seats before | 48 | 9 | 10 |
| Seats won | 30 | 19 | 13 |
| Seat change | ▼18 | ▲9 | ▲4 |
| Popular vote | 11,974 | 12,971 | 7,398 |
| Percentage | 31.2% | 33.8% | 19.3% |
| Swing | ▼20.7% | ▲15.0% | ▲0.2% |
| | Fourth party | Fifth party | Sixth party |
| Leader | Matthew Dorrance |
| Party | Labour | Plaid Cymru | Green |
| Leader's seat | St. John |
| Last election | 6 seats, 9.1% | 0 seats, 0.3% | 0 seats |
| Seats before | 6 | 0 | 0 |
| Seats won | 7 | 2 | 1 |
| Seat change | ▲1 | ▲2 | ▲1 |
| Popular vote | 2,377 | 1,730 | 1,706 |
| Percentage | 6.2% | 4.5% | 4.5% |
| Swing | ▼2.9% | ▲4.2% | ▲4.5% |
- Map of the results of the 2017 Powys County Council election. Yscir (in black) initially received no nominations and was therefore vacant after the election, it was later won by the Conservatives.
Council control before election
Independents
Council control after election
Independent & Conservative Coalition

The sixth election to the Powys County Council since local government reorganization in Wales in 1995 was held on 4 May 2017, along with other local government elections. It was preceded by the 2012 election and was followed by the 2022 election.

== Results overview ==
Powys County Council election result 2017
| Party | Seats | Gains | Losses | Net gain/loss | Seats % | Votes % | Votes | +/− |
|---|---|---|---|---|---|---|---|---|
| Independent | 30 | | | –18 | | 31.5 | 12,222 | –20.4 |
| Conservative | 19 | | | +9 | | 33.9 | 13,136 | +15.1 |
| Liberal Democrats | 13 | | | +4 | | 19.1 | 7,398 | ±0.0 |
| Labour | 7 | | | +1 | | 6.1 | 2,377 | –3.0 |
| Plaid Cymru | 2 | | | +2 | | 4.7 | 1,831 | +4.4 |
| Green | 1 | | | +1 | | 4.6 | 1,706 | +4.6 |
| Christian | 0 | | | 0 | | 0.5 | 196 | +0.2 |

Sixteen seats were uncontested and, in another seat, Yscir, no one initially stood at all for the seat (the only ward in Wales where this happened). Nine Independent seats, out of the thirty won, were due to only one candidate standing for election. Five of the seven Labour seats and one each of the Conservative and Liberal Democrat seats were also uncontested.

== Ward results (Brecknockshire) ==
=== Aber-craf ===
Aber-craf 2017
| Party | Candidate | Votes | % | ±% |
|---|---|---|---|---|
| Labour | Sarah Louise Williams* | unopposed | N/A | −69.9 |
| Labour hold | | Swing | | |

=== Bronllys ===
Bronllys 2017
| Party | Candidate | Votes | % | ±% |
|---|---|---|---|---|
| Independent | Karen Elizabeth Laurie-Parry | 248 | 44.4 | +13.7 |
| Independent | Stephen Davies* | 227 | 40.6 | +9.7 |
| Liberal Democrats | Gareth Roberts | 84 | 15.0 | +4.5 |
| Majority | | 21 | 3.8 | |
| Turnout | | 561 | 54% | |
| Independent gain from Independent | | Swing | | |

=== Builth ===
Builth 2017
| Party | Candidate | Votes | % | ±% |
|---|---|---|---|---|
| Independent | Jeremy David Pugh | 432 | 53.5 | N/A |
| Labour | Ashley Vivian Offa | 375 | 46.5 | N/A |
| Majority | | 57 | 7.0 | |
| Turnout | | 811 | 43% | |
| Independent gain from Independent | | Swing | | |

=== Bwlch ===
Bwlch 2017
| Party | Candidate | Votes | % | ±% |
|---|---|---|---|---|
| Liberal Democrats | Kathryn Susan Silk* | unopposed | N/A | −80.7 |
| Liberal Democrats hold | | Swing | | |

=== Crickhowell ===
Crickhowell 2017
| Party | Candidate | Votes | % | ±% |
|---|---|---|---|---|
| Liberal Democrats | John Gerwyn Morris* | 601 | 54.2 | +54.2 |
| Independent | Sam Games | 507 | 45.8 | N/A |
| Majority | | 94 | 8.4 | |
| Turnout | | 1,114 | 48% | |
| Liberal Democrats hold | | Swing | | |

=== Cwmtwrch ===
Cwmtwrch 2017
| Party | Candidate | Votes | % | ±% |
|---|---|---|---|---|
| Labour | Sandra Christine Davies* | unopposed | N/A | − |
| Labour hold | | Swing | | |

=== Felinfach ===
Felinfach 2017
| Party | Candidate | Votes | % | ±% |
|---|---|---|---|---|
| Liberal Democrats | Roger Hugh Williams | 377 | 58.8 | N/A |
| Conservative | Martin Robert Like | 206 | 32.1 | −5.5 |
| Independent | James Pryce | 58 | 9.0 | N/A |
| Majority | | 171 | 26.7 | |
| Turnout | | 641 | 60% | |
| Liberal Democrats gain from Independent | | Swing | | |

=== Gwernyfed ===
Gwernyfed 2017
| Party | Candidate | Votes | % | ±% |
|---|---|---|---|---|
| Conservative | James Evans | 414 | 68.2 | +28.2 |
| Independent | Geraint George Hopkins* | 193 | 31.8 | −13.0 |
| Majority | | 221 | 36.4 | |
| Turnout | | 616 | 51% | |
| Conservative gain from Independent | | Swing | | |

=== Hay ===
The sitting member had previously stood as a Conservative. His change is shown from when he stood as a Conservative in 2012.

Hay 2017
| Party | Candidate | Votes | % | ±% |
|---|---|---|---|---|
| Liberal Democrats | Gareth William Ratcliffe* | 488 | 71.3 | +71.3 |
| Conservative | Robert Golesworthy | 196 | 28.7 | +28.7 |
| Majority | | 292 | 42.6 | |
| Turnout | | 686 | 56% | |
| Liberal Democrats hold | | Swing | | |

=== Llanafanfawr ===
Llanafanfawr 2017
| Party | Candidate | Votes | % | ±% |
|---|---|---|---|---|
| Independent | David Rowland Price* | unopposed | N/A | − |
| Independent hold | | Swing | | |

=== Llangattock ===
Llangattock 2017
| Party | Candidate | Votes | % | ±% |
|---|---|---|---|---|
| Liberal Democrats | Jackie Charlton | 230 | 51.8 | +20.5 |
| Conservative | Harry Russell Legge-Bourke | 183 | 41.2 | +20.4 |
| Independent | Nicolas Alan Shugar | 31 | 7.0 | N/A |
| Majority | | 47 | 10.6 | |
| Turnout | | 444 | 58% | |
| Liberal Democrats hold | | Swing | | |

=== Llangors ===
Llangors 2017
| Party | Candidate | Votes | % | ±% |
|---|---|---|---|---|
| Green | Emily Victoria Durrant | 173 | 35.7 | N/A |
| Conservative | Clancy Jane Brett | 157 | 32.4 | N/A |
| Independent | Melanie Jade Brookes Davies* | 155 | 32.0 | −31.4 |
| Majority | | 16 | 3.3 | |
| Turnout | | 485 | 54% | |
| Green gain from Independent | | Swing | | |

=== Llangynidr ===
Llangynidr 2017
| Party | Candidate | Votes | % | ±% |
|---|---|---|---|---|
| Independent | Rosemarie Harris* | unopposed | N/A | −80.9 |
| Independent hold | | Swing | | |

=== Llanwrtyd Wells ===
Llanwrtyd Wells 2017
| Party | Candidate | Votes | % | ±% |
|---|---|---|---|---|
| Independent | Timothy John Van-Rees* | unopposed | N/A | −72.8 |
| Independent hold | | Swing | | |

=== Maescar / Llywel ===
Maescar / Llywel 2017
| Party | Candidate | Votes | % | ±% |
|---|---|---|---|---|
| Independent | Edwin Roderick | unopposed | N/A | N/A |
| Independent hold | | Swing | | |

=== St David Within ===
St David Within 2017
| Party | Candidate | Votes | % | ±% |
|---|---|---|---|---|
| Labour Co-op | David William Meredith* | 312 | 47.5 | +3.7 |
| Independent | Martin Weale | 182 | 27.7 | −11.3 |
| Independent | Steve Morgans | 153 | 23.3 | N/A |
| Green | Frances Elizabeth Christley | 10 | 1.5 | N/A |
| Majority | | 130 | 19.8 | |
| Turnout | | 666 | 52% | |
| Labour Co-op hold | | Swing | | |

=== St John ===
St John 2017
| Party | Candidate | Votes | % | ±% |
|---|---|---|---|---|
| Labour Co-op | Matthew James Dorrance* | 1,008 | 74.1 | +2.7 |
| Conservative | Iain Charles McIntosh | 302 | 22.2 | N/A |
| Green | Alexandra Helen Ham | 51 | 3.7 | N/A |
| Majority | | 706 | 51.9 | |
| Turnout | | 1,368 | 57% | |
| Labour Co-op hold | | Swing | | |

=== St Mary ===
St Mary 2017
| Party | Candidate | Votes | % | ±% |
|---|---|---|---|---|
| Conservative | Sarah Rachel Lewis | 485 | 41.4 | +8.9 |
| Liberal Democrats | Sam Bennett | 321 | 27.4 | −11.5 |
| Labour | Ieuan Williams | 246 | 21.0 | −7.6 |
| Green | Gren Ham | 119 | 10.2 | N/A |
| Majority | | 164 | 14.0 | |
| Turnout | | 1,182 | 54% | |
| Conservative gain from Liberal Democrats | | Swing | | |

=== Talgarth ===
Talgarth 2017
| Party | Candidate | Votes | % | ±% |
|---|---|---|---|---|
| Liberal Democrats | William Denston Powell* | 520 | 84.6 | +84.6 |
| Labour | Ryan Dixon | 95 | 15.4 | N/A |
| Majority | | 425 | 69.2 | |
| Turnout | | 627 | 47% | |
| Liberal Democrats hold | | Swing | | |

=== Talybont-on-Usk ===
Talybont-on-Usk 2017
| Party | Candidate | Votes | % | ±% |
|---|---|---|---|---|
| Independent | Liam Fitzpatrick* | unopposed | N/A | −47.4 |
| Independent hold | | Swing | | |

=== Tawe Uchaf ===
Tawe Uchaf 2017
| Party | Candidate | Votes | % | ±% |
|---|---|---|---|---|
| Labour | David Arnold Thomas* | unopposed | N/A | −60.1 |
| Labour hold | | Swing | | |

=== Ynyscedwyn ===
Ynyscedwyn 2017
| Party | Candidate | Votes | % | ±% |
|---|---|---|---|---|
| Labour | Susan McNicholas* | unopposed | N/A | − |
| Labour hold | | Swing | | |

=== Yscir ===
No nominations received.

The postponed poll took place on 22 June 2017 and was won by the Conservative Iain McIntosh.

Yscir 2017
| Party | Candidate | Votes | % | ±% |
|---|---|---|---|---|
| Conservative | Iain McIntosh | 165 | 33.4 | N/A |
| Independent | Chris Davies | 144 | 29.1 | N/A |
| Plaid Cymru | Kate Heneghan | 101 | 20.4 | N/A |
| Green | Bethan Irwin | 80 | 16.2 | N/A |
| Independent | Daniel Evans | 2 | 0.4 | N/A |
| Independent | Steve Davies | 2 | 0.4 | N/A |
| Majority | | 21 | 4.3 | |
| Turnout | | 544 | 62% | |
| Conservative gain from Independent | | Swing | | |

=== Ystradgynlais ===
Ystradgynlais 2017
| Party | Candidate | Votes | % | ±% |
|---|---|---|---|---|
| Labour | David Huw Williams | unopposed | N/A | −38.4 |
| Labour gain from Independent | | Swing | | |

* = sitting councillor prior to the election

== Ward results (Montgomeryshire) ==
=== Banwy ===
Banwy 2017
| Party | Candidate | Votes | % | ±% |
|---|---|---|---|---|
| Independent | Myfanwy Catherine Alexander* | 257 | 60.2 | +60.2 |
| Plaid Cymru | Dafydd Morgan Lewis | 170 | 39.8 | N/A |
| Majority | | 37 | 20.4 | |
| Turnout | | 428 | 52% | |
| Independent hold | | Swing | | |

=== Berriew ===
Berriew 2017
| Party | Candidate | Votes | % | ±% |
|---|---|---|---|---|
| Independent | David Edward Davies* | 327 | 55.5 | +55.5 |
| Conservative | Phil Bettley | 228 | 38.7 | N/A |
| Liberal Democrats | Alan Roger Burch | 34 | 5.8 | N/A |
| Majority | | 99 | 16.8 | |
| Turnout | | 592 | 53% | |
| Independent hold | | Swing | | |

=== Blaen Hafren ===
Blaen Hafren 2017
| Party | Candidate | Votes | % | ±% |
|---|---|---|---|---|
| Conservative | Phyl Davies | 443 | 52.6 | +52.6 |
| Liberal Democrats | Marion Ilyd Brench | 185 | 22.0 | N/A |
| Independent | Andrew David Capel | 128 | 15.2 | N/A |
| Green | Pam Williams | 86 | 10.2 | N/A |
| Majority | | 258 | 30.6 | |
| Turnout | | 847 | 45% | |
| Conservative hold | | Swing | | |

=== Caersws ===
Caersws 2017
| Party | Candidate | Votes | % | ±% |
|---|---|---|---|---|
| Conservative | Les George | 673 | 65.5 | +28.6 |
| Green | Pippa Pemberton | 217 | 21.1 | N/A |
| Liberal Democrats | David John Collington | 137 | 13.3 | N/A |
| Majority | | 456 | 44.4 | |
| Turnout | | 1,029 | 57% | |
| Conservative gain from Independent | | Swing | | |

=== Churchstoke ===
Churchstoke 2017
| Party | Candidate | Votes | % | ±% |
|---|---|---|---|---|
| Independent | Michael John Jones* | unopposed | N/A | −55.0 |
| Independent hold | | Swing | | |

=== Dolforwyn ===
Dolforwyn 2017
| Party | Candidate | Votes | % | ±% |
|---|---|---|---|---|
| Conservative | Gareth Michael Pugh | 553 | 69.5 | +29.8 |
| Independent | Leon Karl Shearer | 243 | 30.5 | N/A |
| Majority | | 310 | 39.0 | |
| Turnout | | 802 | 48% | |
| Conservative hold | | Swing | | |

=== Forden ===
Forden 2017
| Party | Candidate | Votes | % | ±% |
|---|---|---|---|---|
| Independent | Linda Veronica Corfield* | 286 | 51.8 | +1.5 |
| Conservative | Gwyneth Bird | 266 | 48.2 | −1.5 |
| Majority | | 20 | 3.6 | |
| Turnout | | 555 | 48% | |
| Independent hold | | Swing | | |

=== Glantwymyn ===
Glantwymyn 2017
| Party | Candidate | Votes | % | ±% |
|---|---|---|---|---|
| Plaid Cymru | Elwyn Graham Vaughan | 458 | 54.7 | N/A |
| Conservative | Calum Tudor James Davies | 380 | 45.3 | N/A |
| Majority | | 78 | 9.4 | |
| Turnout | | 844 | 52% | |
| Plaid Cymru gain from Independent | | Swing | | |

=== Guilsfield ===
Guilsfield 2017
| Party | Candidate | Votes | % | ±% |
|---|---|---|---|---|
| Independent | David Richard Jones* | 413 | 48.9 | +48.9 |
| Conservative | Ian Harrison | 360 | 42.7 | N/A |
| Liberal Democrats | Jennifer Susan Pratt | 71 | 8.4 | N/A |
| Majority | | 53 | 6.2 | |
| Turnout | | 846 | 45% | |
| Independent hold | | Swing | | |

=== Kerry ===
Kerry 2017
| Party | Candidate | Votes | % | ±% |
|---|---|---|---|---|
| Independent | Kathryn Mary Roberts-Jones* | 406 | 57.2 | +5.2 |
| Conservative | Paul David Martin | 304 | 42.8 | −5.2 |
| Majority | | 102 | 14.4 | |
| Turnout | | 712 | 45% | |
| Independent hold | | Swing | | |

=== Llanbrynmair ===
Llanbrynmair 2017
| Party | Candidate | Votes | % | ±% |
|---|---|---|---|---|
| Conservative | Diane Jones-Poston | 218 | 47.8 | +28.0 |
| Plaid Cymru | Angharad Mair Butler | 144 | 31.6 | N/A |
| Independent | Dai Charles Jones* | 94 | 20.6 | −23.5 |
| Majority | | 74 | 16.2 | |
| Turnout | | 457 | 59% | |
| Conservative hold | | Swing | | |

=== Llandinam ===
Llandinam 2017
| Party | Candidate | Votes | % | ±% |
|---|---|---|---|---|
| Conservative | Robert Karl Lewis | 277 | 44.5 | N/A |
| Independent | Mike Harris | 261 | 42.0 | N/A |
| Green | David Christopher Williams | 43 | 6.9 | N/A |
| Plaid Cymru | William Anthony McAllister-Lovatt | 41 | 6.6 | N/A |
| Majority | | 16 | 2.5 | |
| Turnout | | 624 | 55% | |
| Conservative gain from Independent | | Swing | | |

=== Llandrinio ===
Llandrinio 2017
| Party | Candidate | Votes | % | ±% |
|---|---|---|---|---|
| Conservative | Lucy Margaret Roberts | 573 | 74.3 | N/A |
| Liberal Democrats | Dave Edwards | 198 | 25.7 | N/A |
| Majority | | 375 | 48.6 | |
| Turnout | | 772 | 45% | |
| Conservative gain from Independent | | Swing | | |

=== Llandysilio ===
Llandysilio 2017
| Party | Candidate | Votes | % | ±% |
|---|---|---|---|---|
| Independent | Evan Arwel Jones* | 367 | 65.0 | −5.9 |
| Conservative | Mat Edwards | 198 | 35.0 | +17.3 |
| Majority | | 169 | 30.0 | |
| Turnout | | 563 | 39% | |
| Independent hold | | Swing | | |

=== Llanfair Caereinion ===
Llanfair Caereinion 2017
| Party | Candidate | Votes | % | ±% |
|---|---|---|---|---|
| Independent | Gareth David Jones | 502 | 88.7 | N/A |
| Green | Jenifer Margaret Elizabeth Trythall | 64 | 11.3 | N/A |
| Majority | | 438 | 77.4 | |
| Turnout | | 567 | 43% | |
| Independent gain from Independent | | Swing | | |

=== Llanfihangel ===
Llanfihangel 2017
| Party | Candidate | Votes | % | ±% |
|---|---|---|---|---|
| Independent | Emyr Jones | 228 | 42.3 | N/A |
| Independent | Pamela Jane James | 130 | 24.1 | N/A |
| Conservative | Nick Powell | 118 | 21.9 | N/A |
| Plaid Cymru | Gary Adrian Northeast | 63 | 11.7 | N/A |
| Majority | | 98 | 18.2 | |
| Turnout | | 541 | 60% | |
| Independent gain from Independent | | Swing | | |

=== Llanfyllin ===
Llanfyllin 2017
| Party | Candidate | Votes | % | ±% |
|---|---|---|---|---|
| Conservative | Peter Edward Lewis* | 312 | 66.2 | +66.2 |
| Green | Richard Howard Chaloner | 159 | 33.8 | N/A |
| Majority | | 153 | 32.4 | |
| Turnout | | 472 | 39% | |
| Conservative hold | | Swing | | |

=== Llanidloes ===
The sitting member had previously stood as an independent. His change is shown from his performance as an independent in 2012.

Llanidloes 2017
| Party | Candidate | Votes | % | ±% |
|---|---|---|---|---|
| Liberal Democrats | Gareth Morgan* | 608 | 61.4 | −7.0 |
| Conservative | Pam Smith | 229 | 23.1 | −8.5 |
| Green | Graham Frederick Brand | 87 | 8.8 | N/A |
| Independent | Graham John McArthur | 67 | 6.8 | N/A |
| Majority | | 379 | 38.3 | |
| Turnout | | 993 | 45% | |
| Liberal Democrats gain from Independent | | Swing | | |

=== Llanrhaeadr-ym-Mochnant/Llansilin ===
Llanrhaeadr-ym-Mochnant/Llansilin 2017
| Party | Candidate | Votes | % | ±% |
|---|---|---|---|---|
| Conservative | Aled Wyn Davies* | 625 | 78.3 | +78.3 |
| Green | Steve Jones | 173 | 21.7 | N/A |
| Majority | | 452 | 56.6 | |
| Turnout | | 800 | 44% | |
| Conservative hold | | Swing | | |

=== Llansantffraid ===
Llansantffraid 2017
| Party | Candidate | Votes | % | ±% |
|---|---|---|---|---|
| Conservative | Robert Gwynfor Thomas* | 476 | 61.7 | +2.9 |
| Liberal Democrats | Christopher Richards | 180 | 23.3 | N/A |
| Independent | Berwyn Davies | 116 | 15.0 | N/A |
| Majority | | 296 | 38.4 | |
| Turnout | | 775 | 49% | |
| Conservative hold | | Swing | | |

=== Llanwddyn ===
Llanwddyn 2017
| Party | Candidate | Votes | % | ±% |
|---|---|---|---|---|
| Plaid Cymru | Bryn Peryddon Davies | 192 | 48.1 | N/A |
| Conservative | Simon Robert Maurice Baynes | 159 | 39.8 | N/A |
| Green | Jenny Matthews | 31 | 7.8 | N/A |
| Independent | Darren Mayor* | 17 | 4.3 | +4.3 |
| Majority | | 33 | 8.3 | |
| Turnout | | 401 | 44% | |
| Plaid Cymru gain from Independent | | Swing | | |

=== Machynlleth ===
Machynlleth 2017
| Party | Candidate | Votes | % | ±% |
|---|---|---|---|---|
| Independent | John Michael Williams* | unopposed | N/A | − |
| Independent hold | | Swing | | |

=== Meifod ===
Meifod 2017
| Party | Candidate | Votes | % | ±% |
|---|---|---|---|---|
| Conservative | Jonathan Wilkinson | unopposed | N/A | N/A |
| Conservative gain from Independent | | Swing | | |

=== Montgomery ===
Montgomery 2017
| Party | Candidate | Votes | % | ±% |
|---|---|---|---|---|
| Independent | Stephen Murray Hayes* | 327 | 70.3 | −13.7 |
| Green | Jeremy David Thorp | 138 | 29.7 | N/A |
| Majority | | 189 | 40.6 | |
| Turnout | | 465 | 42% | |
| Independent hold | | Swing | | |

=== Newtown Llanllwchaiarn North ===
Newtown Llanllwchaiarn North 2017
| Party | Candidate | Votes | % | ±% |
|---|---|---|---|---|
| Conservative | Daniel Mark Rowlands | 449 | 59.9 | +33.4 |
| Liberal Democrats | Peter Hough | 213 | 28.4 | −45.1 |
| Plaid Cymru | Roy Allan Norris | 87 | 11.6 | N/A |
| Majority | | 236 | 31.5 | |
| Turnout | | 752 | 42% | |
| Conservative gain from Liberal Democrats | | Swing | | |

=== Newtown Llanllwchaiarn West ===
Newtown Llanllwchaiarn West 2017
| Party | Candidate | Votes | % | ±% |
|---|---|---|---|---|
| Conservative | Mark Antony Barnes | 311 | 45.5 | +45.5 |
| Liberal Democrats | Peter Leslie Hough | 247 | 36.1 | N/A |
| Plaid Cymru | Emyr Sean Poole | 87 | 12.7 | N/A |
| Independent | Richard John White | 39 | 5.7 | N/A |
| Majority | | 64 | 9.4 | |
| Turnout | | 688 | 47% | |
| Conservative hold | | Swing | | |

=== Newtown Central ===
Newtown Central 2017
| Party | Candidate | Votes | % | ±% |
|---|---|---|---|---|
| Liberal Democrats | David Mark Selby | 369 | 54.4 | N/A |
| Conservative | Rupert James Taylor | 309 | 45.6 | +45.6 |
| Majority | | 60 | 8.8 | |
| Turnout | | 679 | 30% | |
| Liberal Democrats gain from Conservative | | Swing | | |

=== Newtown East ===
The sitting member had previously stood as a Liberal Democrat. Her change is shown from her performance as a Liberal Democrat in 2012.

Newtown East 2017
| Party | Candidate | Votes | % | ±% |
|---|---|---|---|---|
| Independent | Joy Rachel Jones* | unopposed | N/A | −58.3 |
| Independent gain from Liberal Democrats | | Swing | | |

=== Newtown South ===
Newtown South 2017
| Party | Candidate | Votes | % | ±% |
|---|---|---|---|---|
| Conservative | Alan Neil Morrison | 203 | 54.9 | +46.7 |
| Plaid Cymru | Richard Gerard Edwards | 109 | 29.5 | N/A |
| Independent | Sharon Evans | 58 | 15.7 | N/A |
| Majority | | 94 | 25.4 | |
| Turnout | | 371 | 29% | |
| Conservative gain from Independent | | Swing | | |

=== Rhiwcynon ===
Rhiwcynon 2017
| Party | Candidate | Votes | % | ±% |
|---|---|---|---|---|
| Independent | Heulwen Doreen Hulme | 343 | 35.0 | N/A |
| Conservative | Ann Lewis | 324 | 33.1 | N/A |
| Plaid Cymru | Stella Ann Jones | 313 | 31.9 | N/A |
| Majority | | 19 | 1.9 | |
| Turnout | | 986 | 58% | |
| Independent gain from Independent | | Swing | | |

=== Trewern ===
Trewern 2017
| Party | Candidate | Votes | % | ±% |
|---|---|---|---|---|
| Conservative | Amanda Jenner | 227 | 55.1 | +19.7 |
| Independent | Jessica Bradley | 185 | 44.9 | +9.5 |
| Majority | | 42 | 10.2 | |
| Turnout | | 418 | 38% | |
| Conservative gain from Independent | | Swing | | |

=== Welshpool Castle ===
Welshpool Castle 2017
| Party | Candidate | Votes | % | ±% |
|---|---|---|---|---|
| Independent | Philip Charles Pritchard* | 160 | 42.0 | −12.7 |
| Liberal Democrats | Richard Wilfred Church | 143 | 37.5 | N/A |
| Conservative | Desmond Parkinson | 78 | 20.5 | +3.1 |
| Majority | | 17 | 4.5 | |
| Turnout | | 383 | 36% | |
| Independent hold | | Swing | | |

=== Welshpool Gungrog ===
Welshpool Gungrog 2017
| Party | Candidate | Votes | % | ±% |
|---|---|---|---|---|
| Liberal Democrats | Francesca Helen Jump* | 240 | 37.1 | −27.7 |
| Conservative | Ruth Marian Canning | 197 | 30.4 | −4.8 |
| Independent | Stephen Thomas Kaye | 144 | 22.3 | −12.9 |
| Plaid Cymru | David Hugh Senior | 66 | 10.2 | N/A |
| Majority | | 43 | 6.7 | |
| Turnout | | 650 | 33% | |
| Liberal Democrats hold | | Swing | | |

=== Welshpool Llanerchyddol ===
Welshpool Llanerchyddol 2017
| Party | Candidate | Votes | % | ±% |
|---|---|---|---|---|
| Independent | Graham Charles Breeze* | 536 | 82.1 | N/A |
| Liberal Democrats | Folkert Ferdinand Veenstra | 117 | 17.9 | −31.9 |
| Majority | | 419 | 64.2 | |
| Turnout | | 659 | 37% | |
| Independent hold | | Swing | | |

* = sitting councillor prior to the election

== Ward results (Radnorshire) ==
=== Beguildy ===
Beguildy 2017
| Party | Candidate | Votes | % | ±% |
|---|---|---|---|---|
| Independent | Rachel Powell | 353 | 58.3 | N/A |
| Independent | Alan Cecil Watson | 252 | 41.7 | +12.8 |
| Majority | | 101 | 16.6 | |
| Turnout | | 616 | 54 | |
| Independent gain from Independent | | Swing | | |

=== Disserth and Trecoed ===
Disserth and Trecoed 2017
| Party | Candidate | Votes | % | ±% |
|---|---|---|---|---|
| Conservative | Gwilym Ioan Snead Williams* | 377 | 64.6 | +4.5 |
| Liberal Democrats | Chris Newton | 157 | 26.9 | −13.0 |
| Green | Dorienne Julia Robinson | 50 | 8.6 | N/A |
| Majority | | 220 | 37.7 | |
| Turnout | | 588 | 56 | |
| Conservative hold | | Swing | | |

=== Glasbury ===
Glasbury 2017
| Party | Candidate | Votes | % | ±% |
|---|---|---|---|---|
| Liberal Democrats | James Gibson-Watt* | 725 | 66.9 | N/A |
| Conservative | Alan Hood | 358 | 33.1 | −18.1 |
| Majority | | 367 | 33.8 | |
| Turnout | | 1,087 | 59 | |
| Liberal Democrats hold | | Swing | | |

=== Knighton ===
The sitting member had previously stood as an independent. His changes are shown from his performance as an independent in 2012.

Knighton 2017
| Party | Candidate | Votes | % | ±% |
|---|---|---|---|---|
| Independent | Ange Williams | 659 | 68.6 | N/A |
| Conservative | Peter James Medlicott* | 302 | 31.4 | −20.2 |
| Majority | | 357 | 37.2 | |
| Turnout | | 967 | 42 | |
| Independent gain from Independent | | Swing | | |

=== Llanbadarn Fawr ===
Llanbadarn Fawr 2017
| Party | Candidate | Votes | % | ±% |
|---|---|---|---|---|
| Independent | Martin Jonathan Weale | 274 | 52.9 | N/A |
| Independent | John Powell* | 192 | 37.1 | +37.1 |
| Labour | Mike Sivier | 52 | 10.0 | N/A |
| Majority | | 82 | 15.8 | |
| Turnout | | 523 | 57 | |
| Independent gain from Independent | | Swing | | |

=== Llandrindod East/West ===
Llandrindod East/West 2017
| Party | Candidate | Votes | % | ±% |
|---|---|---|---|---|
| Independent | Jon Williams | 123 | 29.1 | N/A |
| Independent | Keith Francis Tampin* | 95 | 22.5 | −23.7 |
| Green | Chris Carmichael | 91 | 21.6 | N/A |
| Conservative | Christopher John Hartley | 73 | 17.3 | N/A |
| Independent | David Dennis Markinson | 21 | 5.0 | N/A |
| Christian | Brian Makusha | 19 | 4.5 | −8.7 |
| Majority | | 28 | 6.6 | |
| Turnout | | 424 | 44 | |
| Independent gain from Independent | | Swing | | |

=== Llandrindod North ===
The sitting member had previously stood as an independent. His changes are shown from when he stood as an independent in 2012.

Llandrindod North 2017
| Party | Candidate | Votes | % | ±% |
|---|---|---|---|---|
| Conservative | Gary David Price* | 360 | 53.8 | −1.8 |
| Green | Benjamin Fredrick Webb | 177 | 26.5 | N/A |
| Labour | John Francis Mason | 132 | 19.7 | +7.4 |
| Majority | | 183 | 27.3 | |
| Turnout | | 676 | 44 | |
| Conservative gain from Independent | | Swing | | |

=== Llandrindod South ===
Llandrindod South 2017
| Party | Candidate | Votes | % | ±% |
|---|---|---|---|---|
| Liberal Democrats | Peter David Roberts | 272 | 34.1 | +1.9 |
| Conservative | Tom Turner* | 248 | 31.1 | −13.8 |
| Christian | Jeff Green | 177 | 22.2 | N/A |
| Labour | Grace Kathleen Davis | 100 | 12.5 | N/A |
| Majority | | 24 | 3.0 | |
| Turnout | | 802 | 50 | |
| Liberal Democrats gain from Conservative | | Swing | | |

=== Llanelwedd ===
Llanelwedd 2017
| Party | Candidate | Votes | % | ±% |
|---|---|---|---|---|
| Liberal Democrats | Maureen Mackenzie* | 326 | 66.5 | +66.5 |
| Conservative | Andrew Charles Stuart Baker | 164 | 33.5 | N/A |
| Majority | | 162 | 33.0 | |
| Turnout | | 491 | 50 | |
| Liberal Democrats hold | | Swing | | |

=== Llangunllo ===
Llangunllo 2017
| Party | Candidate | Votes | % | ±% |
|---|---|---|---|---|
| Independent | Hywel Lewis* | 350 | 60.3 | +60.3 |
| Conservative | Edmund Richard Hayward | 230 | 39.7 | N/A |
| Majority | | 120 | 20.6 | |
| Turnout | | 586 | 54 | |
| Independent hold | | Swing | | |

=== Llanyre ===
Llanyre 2017
| Party | Candidate | Votes | % | ±% |
|---|---|---|---|---|
| Conservative | Claire Victoria Mills | 291 | 53.6 | N/A |
| Independent | Les Davies | 125 | 23.0 | N/A |
| Labour | Elspeth Madeleine Parris | 57 | 10.5 | N/A |
| Green | Jane Elizabeth Fey Cooke | 37 | 6.8 | N/A |
| Independent | Geraint Evans | 33 | 6.1 | N/A |
| Majority | | 166 | 30.6 | |
| Turnout | | 543 | 55 | |
| Conservative gain from Independent | | Swing | | |

=== Nantmel ===
Nantmel 2017
| Party | Candidate | Votes | % | ±% |
|---|---|---|---|---|
| Independent | David Owen Evans* | 434 | 75.7 | +23.7 |
| Independent | Donald Wilfred Jenkins | 139 | 24.3 | N/A |
| Majority | | 295 | 51.4 | |
| Turnout | | 578 | 48 | |
| Independent hold | | Swing | | |

=== Old Radnor ===
Old Radnor 2017
| Party | Candidate | Votes | % | ±% |
|---|---|---|---|---|
| Independent | Evan Michael Jones* | unopposed | N/A | −45.3 |
| Independent hold | | Swing | | |

=== Presteigne ===
The sitting member had previously stood as a Liberal Democrat, but was elected as an independent in 2012.

Presteigne 2017
| Party | Candidate | Votes | % | ±% |
|---|---|---|---|---|
| Independent | Beverley Jayne Baynham | 785 | 65.2 | N/A |
| Independent | Wendy Anne Toomey | 219 | 18.2 | N/A |
| Independent | Garry Richard Banks* | 200 | 16.6 | −24.5 |
| Majority | | 566 | 47.0 | |
| Turnout | | 1227 | 56 | |
| Independent gain from Independent | | Swing | | |

=== Rhayader ===
Rhayader 2017
| Party | Candidate | Votes | % | ±% |
|---|---|---|---|---|
| Liberal Democrats | Kelvyn Watson Curry* | 555 | 80.4 | +18.3 |
| Conservative | Catrin Minshull | 135 | 19.6 | +6.9 |
| Majority | | 420 | 60.8 | |
| Turnout | | 693 | 43 | |
| Liberal Democrats hold | | Swing | | |

* = sitting councillor prior to the election

== By-elections ==
=== Llandrindod North ===
Llandrindod North, 24 October 2019
| Party | Candidate | Votes | % | ±% |
|---|---|---|---|---|
| Liberal Democrats | Jake Berriman | 226 | 47.2 | N/A |
| Conservative | Tom Turner | 164 | 34.2 | −19.6 |
| Labour | Rosie McConnell | 89 | 18.6 | −1.1 |
| Majority | | 62 | 13.0 | |
| Turnout | | | | |
| Liberal Democrats gain from Conservative | | Swing | | |

=== Newtown South ===
Newtown South, 24 October 2019
| Party | Candidate | Votes | % | ±% |
|---|---|---|---|---|
| Conservative | Les Skilton | 134 | 43.5 | −11.4 |
| Liberal Democrats | Kelly Healy | 110 | 35.7 | N/A |
| Plaid Cymru | Richard Edwards | 64 | 20.8 | −8.7 |
| Majority | | 24 | 7.8 | |
| Turnout | | | | |
| Conservative hold | | Swing | | |

=== St Mary ===
St Mary, 14 November 2019
| Party | Candidate | Votes | % | ±% |
|---|---|---|---|---|
| Labour | Liz Rijnenberg | 344 | 37.4 | +16.4 |
| Conservative | Alan Roberts | 244 | 26.5 | −14.9 |
| Plaid Cymru | Grenville Ham | 130 | 14.1 | +3.9 |
| Liberal Democrats | Gareth Roberts | 102 | 11.1 | −16.3 |
| Independent | Gareth Phillips | 101 | 11.0 | N/A |
| Majority | | 100 | 10.9 | |
| Turnout | | | | |
| Labour gain from Conservative | | Swing | | |

== See also ==
- List of electoral wards in Powys

== Sources ==
- "County Council Elections 2017 - Brecknockshire". Powys County Council. Archived from the original on 29 January 2018.
- "County Council Elections 2017 - Montgomeryshire". Powys County Council. Archived from the original on 22 January 2018.
- "County Council Elections 2017 - Radnorshire". Powys County Council. Archived from the original on 23 January 2018.
