= Newtown, Powys =

Town in Mid Wales

Coordinates: 52.5132°N 3.3141°W

Newtown: Welsh: Y Drenewydd
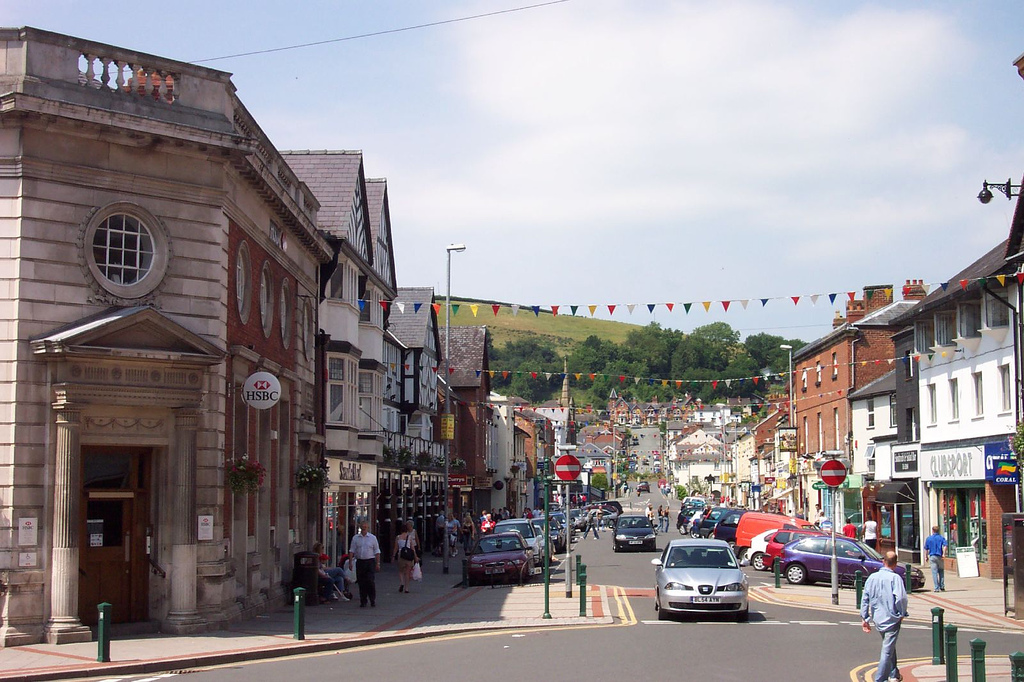
- Newtown town centre

- Location within Powys
- Population: 11,362 (2021)
- OS grid reference: SO115915
- Community: Newtown and Llanllwchaiarn
- Principal area: Powys
- Preserved county: Powys
- Country: Wales
- Sovereign state: United Kingdom
- Post town: NEWTOWN
- Postcode district: SY16
- Dialling code: 01686
- Police: Dyfed-Powys
- Fire: Mid and West Wales
- Ambulance: Welsh
- UK Parliament: Montgomeryshire and Glyndŵr
- Senedd Cymru – Welsh Parliament: Gwynedd Maldwyn
- Website: www.newtown.org.uk

Newtown (Welsh: Y Drenewydd) is a town in Powys, Wales. It lies on the River Severn in the community of Newtown and Llanllwchaiarn, within the historic boundaries of Montgomeryshire. It was designated a new town in 1967 and saw population growth as firms settled, changing its market town character. Its 2001 population of 10,780 rose to 11,357 in the 2011 census, and rose again to 11,362 in the 2021 census.

Newtown was the birthplace of Robert Owen in 1771, whose house stood on the present site of the HSBC Bank. The town has a theatre, Theatr Hafren, and a public gallery, Oriel Davies, displaying contemporary arts and crafts. It is the largest town in Powys and Mid Wales.

== Toponymy ==
The ancient parish and commote are named Cedewain, and Newtown was home to a Llan dedicated to St Mary. As such, the first recorded name for the town was Llanfair-yng-Nghedewain.

Both the modern English name "Newtown" and its Latin variant "Nova Villa" first appear in the thirteenth century following the Norman invasion of Wales. Robert Owen stated that the name was adopted to distinguish the town from the older centre of Norman power in Powys, at Caersws.

The ancient Welsh name continued in use until the modern era. Tudur Owen noted that the modern Welsh name appears with the definite article as Y Drênewydd. Owen stated that this was influenced by Newtown's status as one of only two New towns in Wales proposed by John Silkin in 1949.

== History ==
=== Foundation ===
During the early medieval period a hamlet named Llanfair-yng-Nghedewain lay within the area that is now Newtown. Its original Welsh name is derived from being situated near a River Severn ford below the Long Bridge and close to the church of St Mary in Bettws Cedewain.

The area came to the attention of the English Crown in the 13th century when Llywelyn ap Gruffudd, Prince of Wales, created a new administrative centre (Welsh: cantref) at Dolforwyn Castle near Abermule following the Treaty of Montgomery between himself and Henry III. Llywelyn had the castle built to consolidate the land he had been given according to the treaty. However, it was not long after the death of Henry III in 1272 that tension arose with the English at their outpost of Montgomery Castle in the Welsh Marches. This led Edward I to seize and capture Dolforwyn Castle in 1277. He then granted Llywelyn's lands to the powerful Marcher Lord, Roger Mortimer, who transferred the administration of the cantref of Cedewain and the commote of Ceri from Dolforwyn Castle to a new settlement he planned to build further down the valley at Newtown. The town's market charter was granted in 1279.

With the subjugation of the Welsh completed by 1282, Newtown was developed as an English plantation town as part of Edward I's policy known as the Ring of Iron.

=== Industrialisation ===
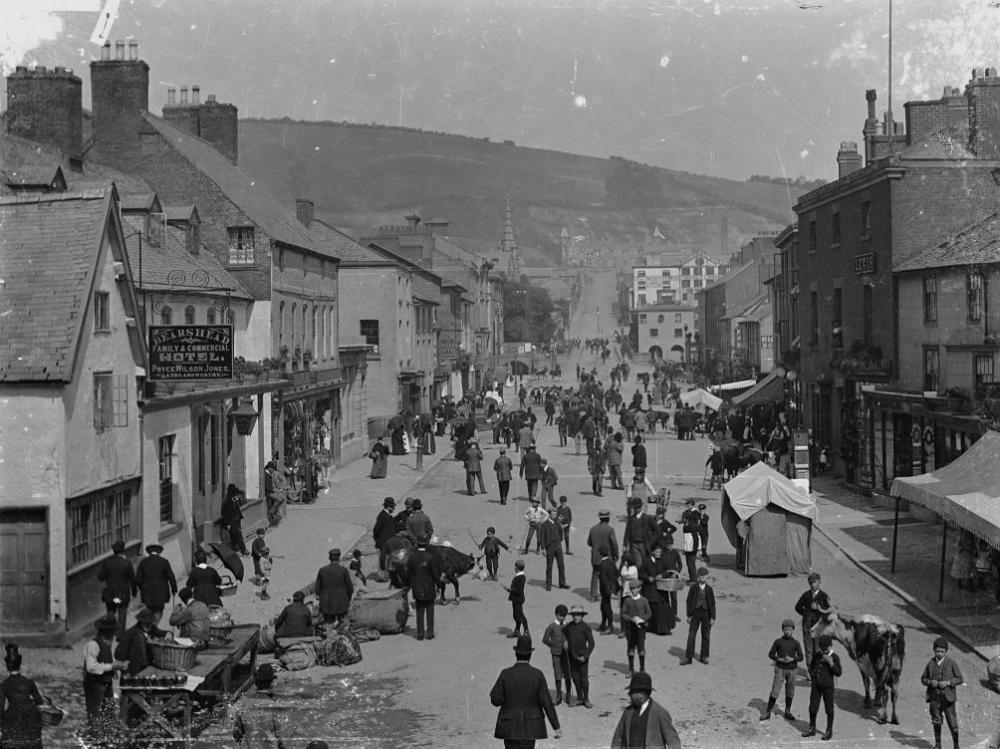
Newtown street scene c.1890

The town grew in the 18th and 19th centuries around the textile and flannel industry, stimulated by completion of the Montgomeryshire Canal. In 1838, the town saw Wales's first Chartist demonstration.

The Cambrian Mills, opened in 1856, were the first steam-driven mills in Newtown. The mills stood beside the canal terminus on the east bank of the Severn. They expanded to become the largest of the Welsh woollen mills. However, by the end of the 19th century the Newtown mills were no longer competitive with those in the north of England. There was a disastrous fire in 1910 and another in 1912, after which the Cambrian Mills were not rebuilt. Thereafter Newtown was no longer an important centre of the woollen industry and many workers moved elsewhere. Newtown hosted the National Eisteddfod in 1965. In 1967, the town was designated a new town. It saw a large population growth as firms and people settled, changing its rural market town character.

== Population ==
The population of Newtown in 2001 was 10,780, and increased to 11,347 in 2011. The census of 2021 recorded 11,362 people.

== Governance ==
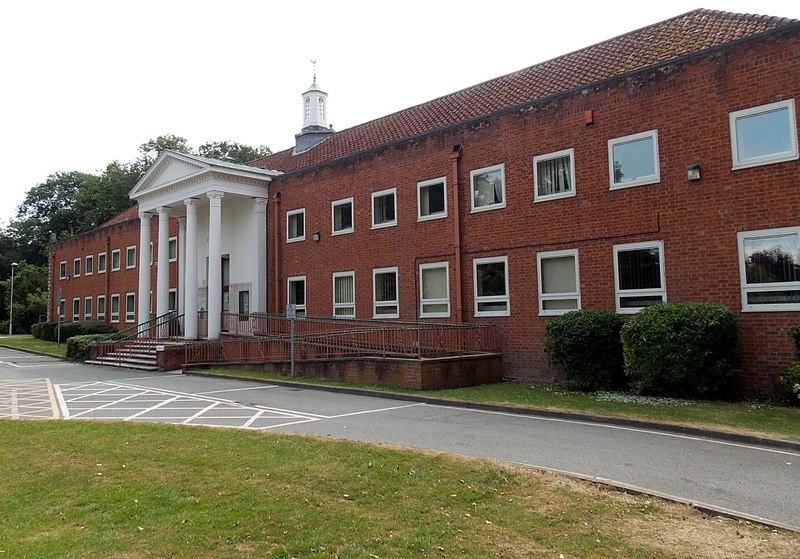
Newtown Town Council offices

There are two tiers of local government covering Newtown, at community (town) and county level: Newtown and Llanllwchaiarn Town Council (often abbreviated to Newtown Town Council) and Powys County Council.

The two parishes of Newtown and Llanllwchaiarn were governed by a single local board from 1866. Such local boards became urban district councils under the Local Government Act 1894, and the Newtown and Llanllwchaiarn Urban District Council went on to govern the town from 1894 until 1974. In 1974 all urban districts were abolished under the Local Government Act 1972, with most of Newtown and Llanllwchaiarn Urban District Council's functions passing to Montgomeryshire District Council. At the same time a community was established covering the area of the former urban district, with its council taking the name Newtown and Llanllwchaiarn Town Council. Further local government reorganisation took place across Wales in 1996, when Montgomeryshire District Council was abolished and its functions passed to Powys County Council.

The Town Council has 16 elected members serving five-year terms, and employs a staff of about ten. It deals mainly with green spaces and public facilities, and as a representative voice for Newtown. The Council Chair or Mayor, elected by the councillors, has been Councillor John Byrne since May 2022.

The community is represented on Powys County Council by five county councillors, each representing a ward: Newtown Central, Newtown East, Newtown Llanllwchaiarn West, Newtown Llanllwchaiarn West and Newtown South.

== Geography ==
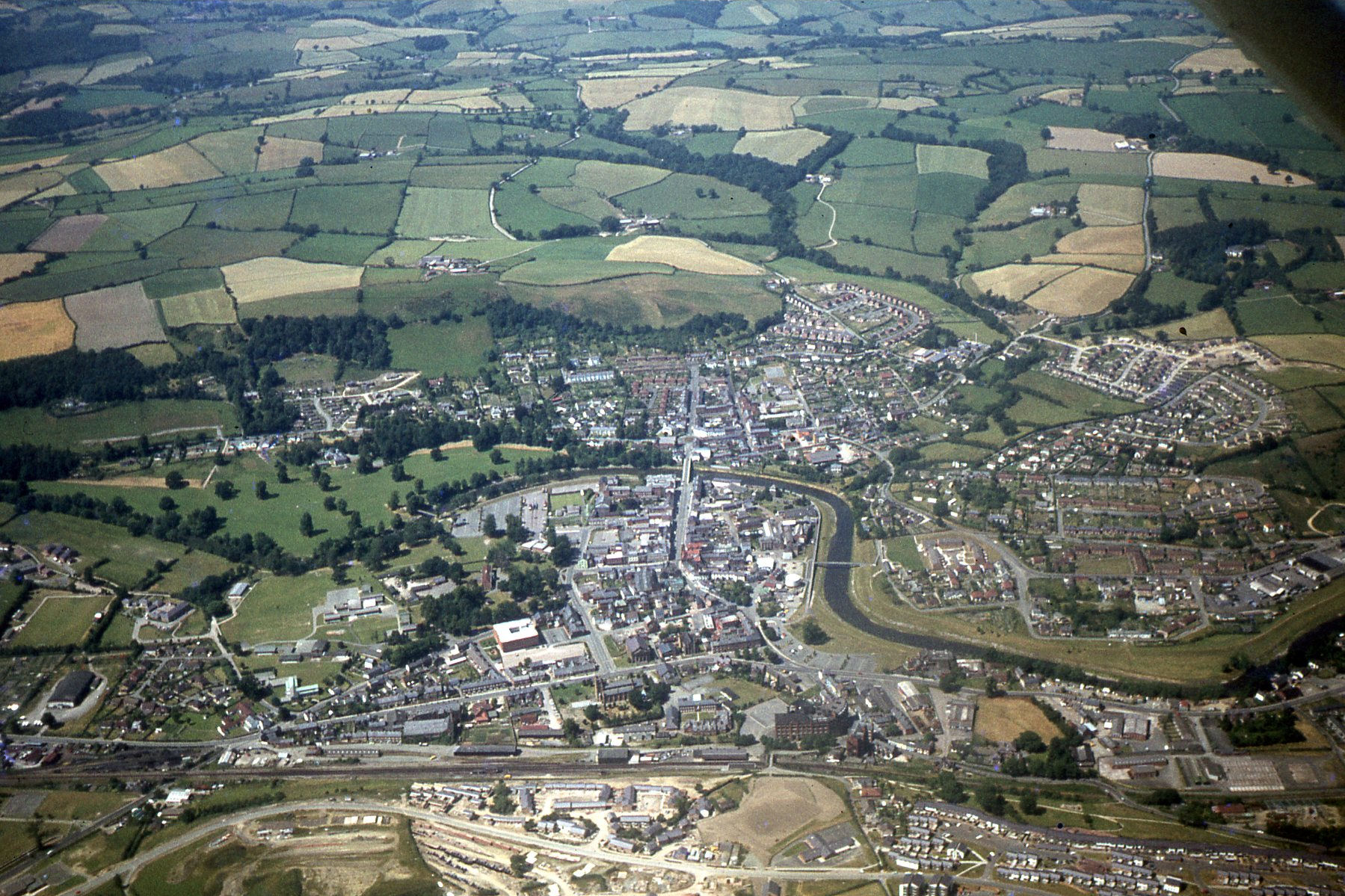
Aerial view of Newtown

Newtown lies about 8 miles (13 km) from the Wales-England border, in the narrow valley of the River Severn, which restricts development north and south of the town. It is surrounded by small villages, often referred to collectively as the Newtown area. The Newtown post town area, including the villages, has a population approaching 16,000. The villages include Aberhafesp, Adfa, Bettws Cedewain, Bwlch-y-ffridd, Cefn-gwyn, Dolfor, Glanmule, Kerry, Llanllwchaiarn, Llanwyddelan, Mochdre, New Mills, Pentre, Rhydlydan, Sarn and Tregynon.

== Buildings and monuments ==
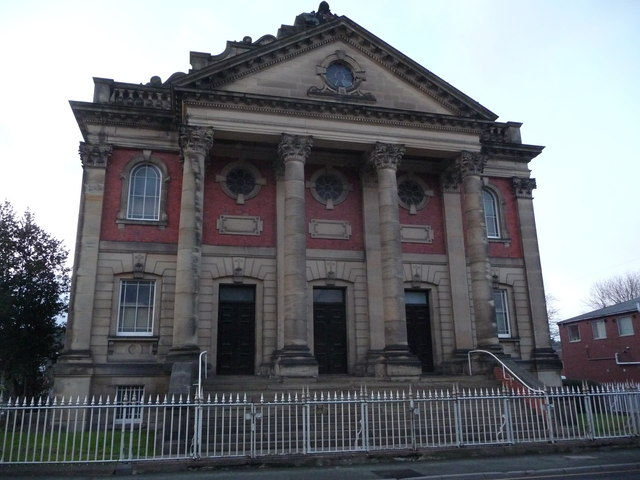
The Baptist Chapel

Built by Pryce Pryce-Jones, the Pryce Jones Royal Welsh Warehouse remains the tallest building in Newtown. The two towering structures housed the world's first mail order service depot.

Bear Lanes, the town's main shopping centre, has a Tudor-style entrance. The building was once a hotel, The Bear, which contributes to the centre's appearance today.

The Robert Owen Museum is on the ground floor of the council offices in Brisco House, Broad Street. A statue of Robert Owen was erected in 1956 in a park off Shortbridge Street and Gas Street. A replica of this was later erected in Manchester.

The Free Library building designed by the architect Frank Shayler of Shrewsbury was built in 1902. The Baptist Chapel, dating from 1881, is a fine example of nonconformist architecture from that period. The Back Lane drill hall was completed in 1897.

== Theatres, museums and galleries ==
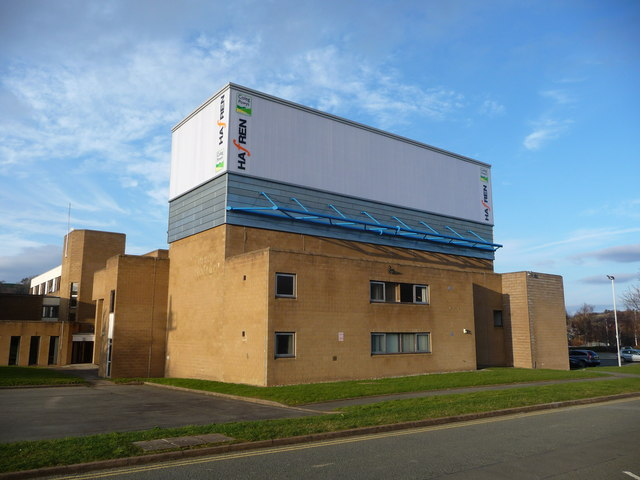
The Hafren theatre

- The Hafren – a 555-seat theatre venue, home of Mid Wales Opera
- Powys Theatre – home of the Newtown Amateur Dramatic Society
- Robert Owen Museum
- Newtown Textile Museum (Welsh: Amgueddfa Wehyddu'r Drenewydd), which is open during the summer months.
- W H Smith Museum (above the shop)
- Oriel Davies – largest visual arts venue in the region

== Transport ==
Newtown's station is on the Cambrian Line served by Transport for Wales. Trains run about once in two hours.

Local bus services in and around the town are operated by local, privately owned companies: Tanat Valley Coaches, Minsterley Motors, and Owen's Travelmaster. Newtown has one National Express bus per day in each direction, to Aberystwyth and to London. Newtown has one TrawsCymru route to Cardiff and a TrawsCymru Connect to Machynlleth and to Wrexham. Two major roads meet at Newtown: the A483 from Swansea to Chester and the A489 from Machynlleth to Craven Arms. The bypass to the south of Newtown opened on 14 February 2019, having been planned since 1949.

The Montgomery Canal terminated in Newtown. After its closure in 1944, the Newtown section was sold for building land, but it gave its name to Canal Road and Lower Canal Road.

== Twin towns and sister cities ==
Newtown is twinned with Les Herbiers, in Pays de la Loire, France.

== Notable people ==
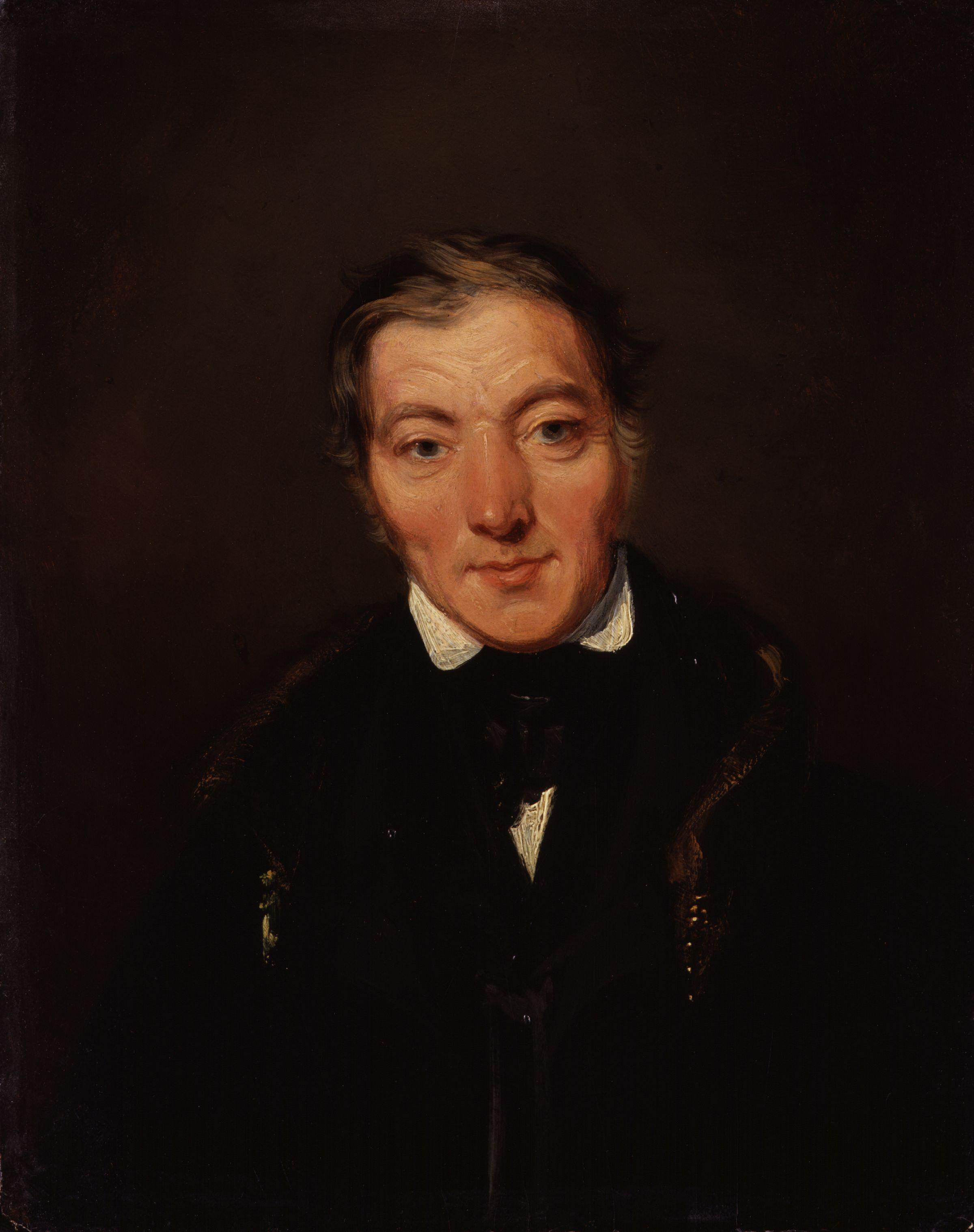
Robert Owen, 1834

- Robert Owen (1771–1858), social reformer and a founder of Utopian socialism and the Co-operative Movement
- John Bentley (1822–1894), member of the Wisconsin State Assembly
- James Trow (1826–1892), an Ontario businessman and politician
- Pryce Pryce-Jones (1834–1920), mail-order entrepreneur born at Llanllwchaiarn, nearby
- Air Commodore Ernest Norton, (1893–1966), RAF Officer and flying ace in WW1
- Geraint Goodwin (1903–1941), novelist and short story writer in English, born in Llanllwchaiarn, near Newtown

=== Sport ===
- William Pryce-Jones (1867-1949) and brother Albert Pryce-Jones (1870-1946), Welsh international footballers
- George Latham (1881–1939), international footballer
- Harry Beadles (1897–1958), Welsh international footballer, born in Llanllwchaiarn, near Newtown
- James Crisp (1927–2005), cricketer
- Barry Hoban (1940-2025), professional cyclist with several stage wins in the Tour de France
- Philip Parkin (born 1961), professional golfer and commentator
- Phil Mills (born 1963), World Rally Championship winning co-driver

== Sports ==
Newtown A.F.C. is Newtown's association football club, and a founding member of the Welsh Premier League in 1992. The club was founded in 1875 as Newtown White Stars and won the Welsh FA Cup in 1879 and 1895. It also entered the qualifying stages of the UEFA Cup on three occasions. The club plays at Latham Park. This has a capacity of 5,000 (1,750 seated) and a full UEFA licence, allowing under-21 international games and European games to be played. In 2007, another 250-seat stand was built next to the media gantry. Further developments are planned. In the past Newtown had several clubs playing in local leagues, including Newtown Wanderers, Newtown Rovers, Newtown Rangers, and Maesyrhandir, and the town also had its own Sunday league. They have all since folded, and as of March 2026, Newtown AFC is the only senior football club in the town.

Newtown RFC is the town's rugby union club, established in 1925. It currently fields first, second, third, youth and junior teams.

Newtown has facilities for lawn bowls, cricket, golf, and for tennis. A basketball club, the Newtown Titans was set up in 2005, before being reconstituted as Mid-Wales Basketball Club in 2009.

== Education ==
The Newtown schools are Ysgol Robert Owen (special needs), Ysgol Calon y Dderwen (4–11), Ysgol Dafydd Llwyd (4–11), St Mary's (4–11), Penygloddfa (4–11), Maesyrhandir (4-11), Treowen (4–11), and Newtown High School and Sixth Form (11–18). The last recently received an outstanding Estyn inspection report in October 2015, praising many features, including teacher/sixth-form pupil relations and school support for a wide range of post-16 vocational and academic subjects. As of 2011, it was proposed that Newtown High School, along with several other schools in Powys, should merge with another county high school, as part of Powys County Council's secondary school and post-16 modernisation programme.
