= 2022 Powys County Council election =

2022 Welsh local election

- 5 May 2022

All 68 seats to Powys County Council 35 seats needed for a majority

	First party	Second party	Third party
Party	Liberal Democrats	Independent	Conservative
Seats won	24	17	14
Seat change	▲11	▼13	▼5
Popular vote	12,440	14,264	10,199
Percentage	27.2%	31.1%	22.3%
Swing	▲8.1pp	▼0.4pp	▼11.6pp
	Fourth party	Fifth party	Sixth party
Party	Labour	Plaid Cymru	Green
Seats won	9	3	1
Seat change	▲2	▲1	Steady
Popular vote	5,424	2,478	1,005
Percentage	11.8%	5.4%	2.2%
Swing	▲5.7pp	▲0.7pp	▼2.4pp
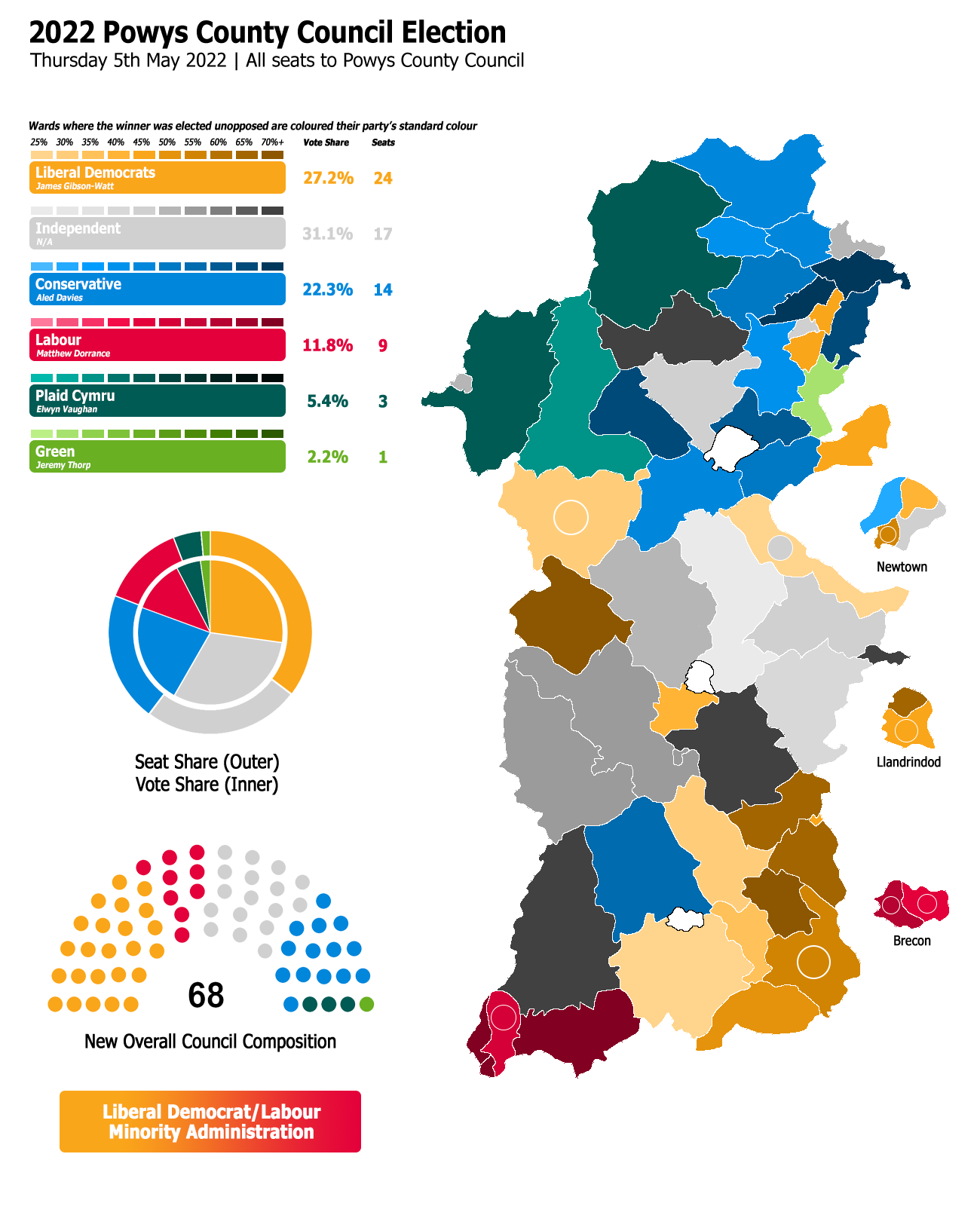
- 2022 election results map

The 2022 Powys Council election took place on 5 May 2022 to elect 68 members to Powys County Council. On the same day, elections were held to the other 21 local authorities and to community councils in Wales as part of the 2022 Welsh local elections. The previous Powys all-council election took place in May 2017 and future elections will take place every five years.

== Results ==
Party	Councillors				Votes		
Party		Of total	Net			Of total	Net
Liberal Democrats	24	35.3%	+11	24 / 68	12,440	27.2%	+8.1%
Independents	17	25.0%	-13	17 / 68	14,264	31.1%	-0.4%
Conservative Party	14	20.6%	-5	14 / 68	10,199	22.3%	-11.6%
Labour Party	9	13.2%	+2	9 / 68	5,424	11.8%	+5.7%
Plaid Cymru	3	4.4%	+1	3 / 68	2,478	5.4%	+0.7%
Green	1	1.5%	±0	1 / 68	1,005	2.2%	-2.4%
Freedom Alliance	0	0.0%	±0	0 / 68	18	0.0%	N/A

== Ward results (Brecknockshire) ==
2022 Brecknockshire results
Party	Councillors				Votes		
Party		Of total	Net			Of total	Net
Labour Party	9	39.1%	+2	9 / 23	4,791	28.3%	+7.2%
Liberal Democrats	9	39.1%	+3	9 / 23	4,444	26.3%	-0.9%
Independents	4	17.4%	-3	4 / 23	4,286	25.3%	+1.1%
Conservative Party	1	4.3%	-2	1 / 23	2,997	17.7%	-4.2%
Plaid Cymru	0	0.0%	±0	0 / 23	314	1.9%	+0.9%
Green	0	0.0%	-1	0 / 23	88	0.5%	-4.0%

=== Aber Craf and Ystradgynlais (2 seats) ===
Aber Craf and Ystradgynlais
Party	Candidate	Votes	%	±%
Labour	Hugo Williams*	924	67.7	N/A
Labour	Sarah Williams*	682	50.0	N/A
Independent	Tristan Davies	370	27.1	N/A
Plaid Cymru	Justin Horrell	314	23.0	N/A
Conservative	Yvonne Abberley	130	9.5	N/A
Conservative	Graham Anderson	117	8.6	N/A
Majority				
Turnout		1,364		
Labour win (new seat)				
Labour win (new seat)				

=== Brecon East (2 seats) ===
Brecon East
Party	Candidate	Votes	%	±%
Labour	Liz Rijnenberg*	909	59.4	N/A
Labour	Chris Walsh	707	46.2	N/A
Conservative	Dawn McIntosh	371	24.2	N/A
Conservative	Marianne Lewis	314	20.5	N/A
Independent	Andrew Powell	258	16.9	N/A
Independent	Nigel Kilgallon	181	11.8	N/A
Liberal Democrats	Robert Charlton	140	9.2	N/A
Majority				
Turnout		1,530		
Labour win (new seat)				
Labour win (new seat)				

=== Brecon West (2 seats) ===
Brecon West
Party	Candidate	Votes	%	±%
Labour	Matthew Dorrance*	1,173	77.3	N/A
Labour	David Meredith*	999	65.9	N/A
Independent	Steve Morgans	349	23.0	N/A
Independent	Martin Weale	330	21.8	N/A
Majority				
Turnout		1,517		
Labour win (new seat)				
Labour win (new seat)				

=== Bronllys and Felin-Fach ===
Bronllys and Felin-Fach
Party	Candidate	Votes	%	±%
Liberal Democrats	Tom Colbert	278	33.0	N/A
Independent	Karen Laurie-Parry*	250	29.7	N/A
Conservative	Paul Evans	153	18.1	N/A
Independent	Tony Thomas	88	10.4	N/A
Independent	Steve Davies	74	8.8	N/A
Majority		28	3.3	
Turnout		843	52	
Liberal Democrats win (new seat)				

=== Builth ===
Builth
Party	Candidate	Votes	%	±%
Independent	Jeremy Pugh*	450	54.5	N/A
Conservative	Liam Hopkins	152	18.4	N/A
Liberal Democrats	Susie Stockton-Link	136	16.5	N/A
Green	Ammi Kaur-Dhaliwal	88	10.7	N/A
Majority		298	36.1	
Turnout		826	44	
Independent hold		Swing		

=== Crickhowell with Cwmdu and Tretower (2 seats) ===
Crickhowell with Cwmdu and Tretower
Party	Candidate	Votes	%	±%
Liberal Democrats	Sarah-Jane Beecham	736	52.5	N/A
Liberal Democrats	Matt Beecham	725	51.7	N/A
Conservative	Sam Games	512	36.5	N/A
Conservative	David Thomas	459	32.8	N/A
Majority				
Turnout		1,401		
Liberal Democrats win (new seat)				
Liberal Democrats win (new seat)				

=== Cwm-twrch ===
Cwm-twrch
Party	Candidate	Votes	%	±%
Labour	Sandra Davies*	463	81.7	N/A
Conservative	Nigel Craddock	104	18.3	N/A
Majority		359	63.4	
Turnout		567	37	
Labour hold		Swing		

=== Gwernyfed ===
Gwernyfed
Party	Candidate	Votes	%	±%
Liberal Democrats	William Lloyd	423	69.2	N/A
Conservative	Robert Golesworthy	188	30.8	N/A
Majority		235	38.4	
Turnout		611	51	
Liberal Democrats gain from Conservative		Swing		

=== Hay ===
Hay
Party	Candidate	Votes	%	±%
Liberal Democrats	Gareth Ratcliffe*	Unopposed		
Liberal Democrats hold		Swing		

=== Llanafanfawr with Garth ===
Llanafanfawr with Garth
Party	Candidate	Votes	%	±%
Independent	Bryan Davies	371	58.0	N/A
Liberal Democrats	Tim Wilson	269	42.0	N/A
Majority		102	16.0	
Turnout		640	49	
Independent win (new seat)				

=== Llangattock and Llangynidr ===
Llangattock and Llangynidr
Party	Candidate	Votes	%	±%
Liberal Democrats	Jackie Charlton*	541	54.3	N/A
Independent	Rosemarie Harris*	455	45.7	N/A
Majority		86	8.6	
Turnout		996	59	
Liberal Democrats win (new seat)				

=== Llangors with Bwlch ===
Llangors with Bwlch
Party	Candidate	Votes	%	±%
Liberal Democrats	Sian Cox	319	38.7	N/A
Independent	Melanie Davies	260	31.5	N/A
Conservative	Matt MacKinnon	192	23.3	N/A
Independent	Mike Tunnicliffe	54	6.5	N/A
Majority		59	7.2	
Turnout		825	59	
Liberal Democrats win (new seat)				

=== Llanwrtyd Wells ===
Llanwrtyd Wells
Party	Candidate	Votes	%	±%
Independent	Peter James	405	57.8	N/A
Liberal Democrats	Martin Piggott	296	42.2	N/A
Majority		109	15.6	
Turnout		701	52	
Independent hold		Swing		

=== Maescar and Llywel ===
Maescar and Llywel
Party	Candidate	Votes	%	±%
Independent	Edwin Roderick*	490	70.9	N/A
Liberal Democrats	Linda Wickham	128	18.5	N/A
Labour	Roger Maidment	73	10.6	N/A
Majority		362	52.4	
Turnout		691	50	
Independent hold		Swing		

=== Talgarth ===
Talgarth
Party	Candidate	Votes	%	±%
Liberal Democrats	William Powell*	588	74.3	N/A
Conservative	Peter Weavers	203	25.7	N/A
Majority		385	48.6	
Turnout		791	59	
Liberal Democrats hold		Swing		

=== Talybont-on-Usk ===
Talybont-on-Usk
Party	Candidate	Votes	%	±%
Liberal Democrats	Anita Cartwright	236	27.6	N/A
Independent	Glasnant Morgan	217	25.4	N/A
Conservative	Judith Evans	206	24.1	N/A
Independent	Charles De Winton	195	22.8	N/A
Majority		19	2.2	
Turnout		854	54	
Liberal Democrats gain from Independent		Swing		

=== Tawe Uchaf ===
Tawe Uchaf
Party	Candidate	Votes	%	±%
Labour	David Thomas*	572	78.6	N/A
Conservative	Arianwen Harris	156	21.4	N/A
Majority		416	57.2	
Turnout		728	43	
Labour hold		Swing		

=== Ynyscedwyn ===
Ynyscedwyn
Party	Candidate	Votes	%	±%
Labour	Susan McNicholas*	677	84.4	N/A
Conservative	Peter Walsh	125	15.6	N/A
Majority		552	68.8	
Turnout		802	48	
Labour hold		Swing		

=== Yscir with Honddu Isaf and Llanddew ===
Yscir with Honddu Isaf and Llanddew
Party	Candidate	Votes	%	±%
Conservative	Iain McIntosh*	505	58.1	N/A
Liberal Democrats	Raiff Devlin	354	41.9	N/A
Majority		151	16.2	
Turnout		869	60	
Conservative win (new seat)				

== Ward results (Montgomeryshire) ==
2022 Montgomeryshire results
Party	Councillors				Votes		
Party		Of total	Net			Of total	Net
Conservative Party	13	41.9%	-1	13 / 31	5,502	30.9%	-12.4%
Liberal Democrats	8	25.8%	+5	8 / 31	3,573	20.1%	+6.1%
Independents	6	19.4%	-9	6 / 31	5,209	29.3%	+0.5%
Plaid Cymru	3	9.7%	+1	3 / 31	2,164	12.2%	+3.4%
Green	1	3.2%	+1	1 / 31	684	3.8%	-1.3%
Labour Party	0	0.0%	±0	0 / 31	633	3.6%	N/A
Freedom Alliance	0	0.0%	±0	0 / 31	18	0.1%	N/A

=== Banwy, Llanfihangel and Llanwddyn ===
Banwy, Llanfihangel and Llanwddyn
Party	Candidate	Votes	%	±%
Plaid Cymru	Bryn Davies*	437	45.0	N/A
Independent	Emyr Jones*	320	33.0	N/A
Independent	Myfanwy Alexander*	214	22.0	N/A
Majority		117	12.0	
Turnout		971		
Plaid Cymru win (new seat)				

=== Berriew and Castle Caereinion ===
Berriew and Castle Caereinion
Party	Candidate	Votes	%	±%
Conservative	Adrian Jones	278	42.3	N/A
Independent	Dai Davies*	215	32.7	N/A
Liberal Democrats	Richard Derricutt	164	25.0	N/A
Majority		63	9.6	
Turnout		657	41	
Conservative win (new seat)				

=== Caersws ===
Caersws
Party	Candidate	Votes	%	±%
Conservative	Leslie George*	473	66.6	N/A
Green	Mik Norman	237	33.4	N/A
Majority		236	33.2	
Turnout		710		
Conservative hold		Swing		

=== Churchstoke ===
Churchstoke
Party	Candidate	Votes	%	±%
Liberal Democrats	Danny Bebb	348	49.1	N/A
Conservative	Rachel Jones	256	36.1	N/A
Independent	Michael Jones*	105	14.8	N/A
Majority		92	13.0	
Turnout		709		
Liberal Democrats gain from Independent		Swing		

=== Dolforwyn ===
Dolforwyn
Party	Candidate	Votes	%	±%
Conservative	Gareth Pugh*	486	62.5	N/A
Liberal Democrats	Alan Meredith-Jones	291	37.5	N/A
Majority		195	25.0	
Turnout		777	49	
Conservative hold		Swing		

=== Forden and Montgomery ===
Forden and Montgomery
Party	Candidate	Votes	%	±%
Green	Jeremy Thorp	333	33.4	N/A
Independent	Rob Harper	313	31.4	N/A
Conservative	Maurice Jones	243	24.4	N/A
Independent	Oliver Lewis	107	10.7	N/A
Majority		20	2.0	
Turnout		996	48	
Green win (new seat)				

=== Glantwymyn ===
Glantwymyn
Party	Candidate	Votes	%	±%
Plaid Cymru	Elwyn Vaughan*	Unopposed		
Plaid Cymru hold		Swing		

=== Guilsfield ===
Guilsfield
Party	Candidate	Votes	%	±%
Conservative	Ian Harrison	370	72.0	N/A
Liberal Democrats	Ewan Smout	144	28.0	N/A
Majority		226	44.0	
Turnout		514	39	
Conservative gain from Independent		Swing		

=== Kerry ===
Kerry
Party	Candidate	Votes	%	±%
Conservative	Ben Breeze	340	52.6	N/A
Independent	Kath Roberts-Jones*	306	47.4	N/A
Majority		34	5.2	
Turnout		646	45	
Conservative gain from Independent		Swing		

=== Llanbrynmair ===
Llanbrynmair
Party	Candidate	Votes	%	±%
Plaid Cymru	Gary Mitchell	307	35.5	N/A
Conservative	Robert Jenkins	278	32.1	N/A
Independent	Sarah Reast	253	29.2	N/A
Independent	Philip Smith	27	3.1	N/A
Majority		29	3.4	
Turnout		865		
Plaid Cymru gain from Conservative		Swing		

=== Llandinam with Dolfor ===
Llandinam with Dolfor
Party	Candidate	Votes	%	±%
Conservative	Karl Lewis*	Unopposed		
Conservative win (new seat)				

=== Llandrinio ===
Llandrinio
Party	Candidate	Votes	%	±%
Conservative	Lucy Roberts*	434	71.7	N/A
Independent	David Markinson	171	28.3	N/A
Majority		263	43.4	
Turnout		605	35	
Conservative hold		Swing		

=== Llandysilio ===
Llandysilio
Party	Candidate	Votes	%	±%
Independent	Arwel Jones*	272	51.7	N/A
Independent	Bill Lee	254	48.3	N/A
Majority		18	3.4	
Turnout		526	35	
Independent hold		Swing		

=== Llanfair Caereinion and Llanerfyl ===
Llanfair Caereinion and Llanerfyl
Party	Candidate	Votes	%	±%
Independent	Gareth Jones*	555	78.5	N/A
Labour	Paul Wixey	152	21.5	N/A
Majority		403	57.0	
Turnout		707	45	
Independent win (new seat)				

=== Llanfyllin ===
Llanfyllin
Party	Candidate	Votes	%	±%
Conservative	Peter Lewis*	261	44.8	N/A
Liberal Democrats	Alison Alexander	241	41.3	N/A
Plaid Cymru	David Weston	81	13.9	N/A
Majority		20	3.5	
Turnout		583	49	
Conservative hold		Swing		

=== Llangyniew and Meifod ===
Llangyniew and Meifod
Party	Candidate	Votes	%	±%
Conservative	Jonathan Wilkinson*	366	54.6	N/A
Plaid Cymru	Jane Carrington	147	21.9	N/A
Labour	Ben Gwalchmai	124	18.5	N/A
Independent	Sally Markinson	33	4.9	N/A
Majority		219	32.7	
Turnout		670	42	
Conservative win (new seat)				

=== Llanidloes (2 seats) ===
Llanidloes
Party	Candidate	Votes	%	±%
Liberal Democrats	Gareth Morgan*	706	41.8	N/A
Liberal Democrats	Glyn Preston	605	35.9	N/A
Independent	Graham Jones	589	34.9	N/A
Conservative	Phyl Davies*	355	21.0	N/A
Labour	Zoe Allan	279	16.5	N/A
Plaid Cymru	Graham Davies	219	13.0	N/A
Plaid Cymru	Victoria Chapman	136	8.1	N/A
Green	David Williams	114	6.8	N/A
Independent	John Dore	42	2.5	N/A
Majority				
Turnout		1,687		
Liberal Democrats hold		Swing		
Liberal Democrats win (new seat)				

=== Llanrhaeadr-ym-Mochant and Llansilin ===
Llanrhaeadr-ym-Mochant and Llansilin
Party	Candidate	Votes	%	±%
Conservative	Aled Davies*	Unopposed		
Conservative win (new seat)				

=== Llansantffraid ===
Llansantffraid
Party	Candidate	Votes	%	±%
Conservative	Gwynfor Thomas*	Unopposed		
Conservative hold		Swing		

=== Machynlleth ===
Machynlleth
Party	Candidate	Votes	%	±%
Independent	Mike Williams*	404	53.3	N/A
Plaid Cymru	Alwyn Evans	319	42.1	N/A
Independent	Robert Williams	35	4.6	N/A
Majority		85	11.2	
Turnout		758	45	
Independent hold		Swing		

=== Newtown Central and South (2 seats) ===
Newtown Central and South
Party	Candidate	Votes	%	±%
Liberal Democrats	David Selby*	554	60.9	N/A
Liberal Democrats	Kelly Healy	500	54.9	N/A
Conservative	Darryl Gwilt	240	26.4	N/A
Independent	Les Skilton*	212	23.3	N/A
Conservative	Paul Sawtell	155	17.0	N/A
Majority				
Turnout		910		
Liberal Democrats win (new seat)				
Liberal Democrats win (new seat)				

=== Newtown East ===
Newtown East
Party	Candidate	Votes	%	±%
Independent	Joy Jones*	Unopposed		
Independent hold		Swing		

=== Newtown North ===
Newtown North
Party	Candidate	Votes	%	±%
Liberal Democrats	Adam Kinnerley	301	40.5	N/A
Conservative	Dan Rowlands*	300	40.3	N/A
Independent	Jackie Molloy-Davies	143	19.2	N/A
Majority		1	0.2	
Turnout		744	42	
Liberal Democrats win (new seat)				

=== Newtown West ===
Newtown West
Party	Candidate	Votes	%	±%
Conservative	Peter Lewington	230	33.8	N/A
Liberal Democrats	Harry Robson	166	24.4	N/A
Independent	Gill Bridgewater	166	24.4	N/A
Plaid Cymru	Gill Thurston	118	17.4	N/A
Majority		64	9.4	
Turnout		680	46	
Conservative win (new seat)				

=== Rhiwcynon ===
Rhiwcynon
Party	Candidate	Votes	%	±%
Independent	Heulwin Hulme*	436	45.1	N/A
Plaid Cymru	Ann Jones	428	44.3	N/A
Independent	Linda Bennett	84	8.7	N/A
Freedom Alliance	Julia Moore	18	1.9	N/A
Majority		8	0.8	
Turnout		966	55	
Independent hold		Swing		

=== Trelystan and Trewern ===
Trelystan and Trewern
Party	Candidate	Votes	%	±%
Conservative	Amanda Jenner*	367	66.1	N/A
Liberal Democrats	Tim Saul	188	33.9	N/A
Majority		179	32.2	
Turnout		555	40	
Conservative win (new seat)				

=== Welshpool Castle ===
Welshpool Castle
Party	Candidate	Votes	%	±%
Liberal Democrats	Richard Church	246	47.9	N/A
Independent	Phil Pritchard*	124	24.1	N/A
Labour	Ian Parry	78	15.2	N/A
Conservative	Olly Edwards	66	12.8	N/A
Majority		122	23.8	
Turnout		514	31	
Liberal Democrats gain from Independent		Swing		

=== Welshpool Gungrog ===
Welshpool Gungrog
Party	Candidate	Votes	%	±%
Liberal Democrats	Carol Robinson	224	45.6	N/A
Conservative	Ruth Canning	159	32.4	N/A
Plaid Cymru	Luke Harper	108	22.0	N/A
Majority		65	13.2	
Turnout		491		
Liberal Democrats gain from Independent		Swing		

=== Welshpool Llanerchyddol ===
Welshpool Llanerchyddol
Party	Candidate	Votes	%	±%
Independent	Graham Breeze*	Unopposed		
Independent hold		Swing		

== Ward results (Radnorshire) ==
2022 Radnorshire results
Party	Councillors				Votes		
Party		Of total	Net			Of total	Net
Independents	7	50.0%	-1	7 / 14	4,769	42.9%	-0.9%
Liberal Democrats	7	50.0%	+3	7 / 14	4,423	39.8%	+18.9%
Conservative Party	0	0.0%	-3	0 / 14	1,700	15.3%	-10.8%
Green	0	0.0%	±0	0 / 14	233	2.1%	-1.6%

=== Disserth and Trecoed with Newbridge ===
Disserth and Trecoed with Newbridge
Party	Candidate	Votes	%	±%
Liberal Democrats	Little Brighouse	290	43.7	N/A
Conservative	Dilys Price	215	32.4	N/A
Green	Dorienne Robinson	108	16.3	N/A
Independent	Ray Johnson-Wood	50	7.5	N/A
Majority		75	11.3	
Turnout		663	43	
Liberal Democrats win (new seat)				

=== Glasbury ===
Glasbury
Party	Candidate	Votes	%	±%
Liberal Democrats	James Gibson-Watt*	561	65.1	N/A
Conservative	Rhodri Boosey	300	34.9	N/A
Majority		261	30.2	
Turnout		861	60	
Liberal Democrats hold		Swing		

=== Ithon Valley ===
Ithon Valley
Party	Candidate	Votes	%	±%
Independent	Geoff Morgan	296	28.6	N/A
Independent	Martin Weale*	253	24.5	N/A
Conservative	Gareth Hughes	217	21.0	N/A
Independent	Rachel Powell*	176	17.0	N/A
Liberal Democrats	Charlotte Spencer	92	8.9	N/A
Majority		43	4.1	
Turnout		1034	61	
Independent win (new seat)				

=== Knighton with Beguildy (2 seats) ===
Knighton with Beguildy
Party	Candidate	Votes	%	±%
Liberal Democrats	Corinna Kenyon-Wade	566	43.6	N/A
Independent	Ange Williams*	490	37.8	N/A
Independent	Chris Branford	484	37.3	N/A
Conservative	Anthony Watts	426	32.8	N/A
Independent	Bob Andrews	237	18.3	N/A
Majority				
Turnout		1,298		
Liberal Democrats win (new seat)				
Independent win (new seat)				

=== Llandrindod North ===
Llandrindod North
Party	Candidate	Votes	%	±%
Liberal Democrats	Jake Berriman*	408	68.9	N/A
Independent	Jon Williams*	159	26.9	N/A
Green	Antony Swinbourne	25	4.2	N/A
Majority		249	42.0	
Turnout		592	38	
Liberal Democrats gain from Conservative		Swing		

=== Llandrindod South (2 seats) ===
Llandrindod South
Party	Candidate	Votes	%	±%
Liberal Democrats	Pete Roberts*	694	58.1	N/A
Liberal Democrats	Josie Ewing	634	53.1	N/A
Independent	Andrew Price	463	38.7	N/A
Conservative	Stuart Rawson	276	23.1	N/A
Majority				
Turnout		1,195		
Liberal Democrats hold		Swing		
Liberal Democrats win (new seat)				

=== Llanelwedd ===
Llanelwedd
Party	Candidate	Votes	%	±%
Independent	Gareth Jones	505	71.7	N/A
Liberal Democrats	Jeremy Andrews	199	28.3	N/A
Majority		306	43.4	
Turnout		704	50	
Independent gain from Liberal Democrats		Swing		

=== Llangunllo with Norton ===
Llangunllo with Norton
Party	Candidate	Votes	%	±%
Independent	Deb Edwards	359	45.0	N/A
Liberal Democrats	Nigel Bufton	303	38.0	N/A
Conservative	Paddy O'Kennedy	135	16.9	N/A
Majority		56	7.0	
Turnout		797	59	
Independent win (new seat)				

=== Llanyre with Nantmel ===
Llanyre with Nantmel
Party	Candidate	Votes	%	±%
Independent	Clare Mills*	386	53.7	N/A
Liberal Democrats	Chris Newton	332	46.3	N/A
Majority		54	7.4	
Turnout		718	42	
Independent win (new seat)				

=== Old Radnor ===
Old Radnor
Party	Candidate	Votes	%	±%
Independent	Edward Jones	310	43.5	N/A
Liberal Democrats	Ben Asson	272	38.1	N/A
Conservative	Michael McInnes	131	18.4	N/A
Majority		38	5.4	
Turnout		713	51	
Independent hold		Swing		

=== Presteigne ===
Presteigne
Party	Candidate	Votes	%	±%
Independent	Beverley Baynham*	527	71.9	N/A
Liberal Democrats	Leon Abecasis	106	14.5	N/A
Green	Richard Shipp	100	13.6	N/A
Majority		421	57.4	
Turnout		733	43	
Independent hold		Swing		

=== Rhayader ===
Rhayader
Party	Candidate	Votes	%	±%
Liberal Democrats	Angela Davies	600	89.0	N/A
Independent	Jeremy Snook	74	11.0	N/A
Majority		526	78.0	
Turnout		674	41.5	
Liberal Democrats hold		Swing		

== Aftermath ==
On 25 May 2022, Labour and the Liberal Democrats announced that they had agreed a deal to run the council, meaning Powys would be led by party political groups for the first time since its creation.

== By-elections ==
=== Crickhowell with Cwmdu and Tretower ===
Crickhowell with Cwmdu and Tretower: 9 November 2023
Party	Candidate	Votes	%	±%
Liberal Democrats	Claire Hall	698	62.5	+10.0
Liberal Democrats	Chloe Masefield	658	59.0	+7.3
Conservative	Rosemarie Harris	292	26.2	−10.3
Conservative	David Thomas	275	24.6	−8.2
Independent	Sam Games	116	10.4	N/A
Labour	Zoe Allan	92	8.2	N/A
Independent	David Markinson	18	1.6	N/A
Majority		N/A	N/A	N/A
Turnout		1,122	40.1	
Liberal Democrats hold				
Liberal Democrats hold				

=== Talybont-on-Usk ===
Talybont-on-Usk: 22 November 2023
Party	Candidate	Votes	%	±%
Liberal Democrats	Raiff Devlin	352	51.0	+23.4
Conservative	Charles De Winton	241	34.9	+12.1
Independent	Liam Fitzpatrick	83	12.0	N/A
Independent	David Markinson	14	2.0	N/A
Majority		111	16.1	+13.9
Turnout		690		
Liberal Democrats hold		Swing	+6.3	

=== Rhiwcynon ===
Rhiwcynon: 4 June 2024
Party	Candidate	Votes	%	±%
Conservative	John Yeomans	352	39.9	N/A
Plaid Cymru	Ann Jones	286	32.4	−11.9
Independent	Richard Jones	110	12.5	N/A
Liberal Democrats	Richard Amy	74	8.4	N/A
Labour	Paul Wixey	25	2.8	N/A
Reform	Oliver Lewis	18	2.0	N/A
Green	Rhodri Parfitt	13	1.5	N/A
Independent	David Markinson	4	0.5	N/A
Majority		66	7.5	
Turnout		882		
Conservative gain from Independent		Swing		

=== Machynlleth ===
Machynlleth: 9 October 2024
Party	Candidate	Votes	%	±%
Plaid Cymru	Alwyn Evans	267	35.9	−6.2
Independent	Gareth Jones	227	30.5	N/A
Labour	Colin Rigby	115	15.5	N/A
Liberal Democrats	Dylan Owen	81	10.9	N/A
Green	Amerjit Dhaliwal	34	4.6	N/A
Reform	Oliver Lewis	20	2.7	N/A
Majority		40	5.4	
Turnout		744		
Plaid Cymru gain from Independent		Swing		

=== Llanidloes ===
Llanidloes: 3 July 2025
Party	Candidate	Votes	%	±%
Liberal Democrats	Fleur Frantz-Morgans	557	35.5	−6.3
Reform	Graham Maurice Jones	551	35.1	+0.2
Plaid Cymru	Victoria Louise Evans	225	14.3	+1.3
Conservative	Phylip Rhys Davies	118	7.5	−13.5
Labour	Trudy Davies	112	7.1	−9.4
Independent	David Dennis Campbell	6	0.4	N/A
Majority		6	0.4	
Turnout		1,569		
Registered electors				
Liberal Democrats hold		Swing		

=== Llandrindod South ===
Llandrindod South: 7 May 2026
Party	Candidate	Votes	%	±%
Liberal Democrats	Lauren D’Silva	506	32.0	−21.1
Reform	John Ball	431	27.2	N/A
Plaid Cymru	Thomas Duggan	185	11.7	N/A
Conservative	Mark Burton	179	11.3	−11.8
Green	Janet Barker	174	11.0	N/A
Independent	Christopher Moore	64	4.0	N/A
Independent	Paul Smith	44	2.8	N/A
Majority		75	4.8	
Turnout		1,583	54.13	
Liberal Democrats hold		Swing		

=== Glantwymyn ===
Glantwymyn: 2 July 2026
Party	Candidate	Votes	%	±%
Plaid Cymru	Rwth Hughes	513	81.8	+81.8
Reform	Peter Robinson	63	10.0	N/A
Conservative	Heidi Rhiann	28	4.5	N/A
Liberal Democrats	Angela Standrin	23	3.7	N/A
Majority		450	71.8	
Turnout		631	35.11	
Plaid Cymru hold		Swing		

=== Llanyre with Nantmel ===
Llanyre with Nantmel: 2 July 2026
Party	Candidate	Votes	%	±%
Reform	Gareth Hughes	359	41.6	N/A
Liberal Democrats	Tim Wilson	226	26.2	−20.1
Conservative	Tyler Chambers	210	24.3	N/A
Independent	David Evans	51	5.9	N/A
Green	Steve Court	18	2.1	N/A
Majority		133	15.4	
Turnout		865	49.57	
Reform gain from Independent		Swing		

=== Yscir with Honddu Isaf and Llanddew ===
Yscir with Honddu Isaf and Llanddew: 2 July 2026
Party	Candidate	Votes	%	±%
Liberal Democrats	Colin Millichap	297	39.7	−2.2
Reform	Dawn McIntosh	259	34.6	N/A
Plaid Cymru	Kate Heneghan	96	12.8	N/A
Conservative	Mark Burton	68	9.1	−49.0
Green	Eric Rosoman-Matthews	15	2.0	N/A
Labour	Alan Cooper	14	1.9	N/A
Majority		38	5.1	
Turnout		750	51.08	
Liberal Democrats gain from Conservative		Swing		
