= Norton, Powys =

Coordinates: 52.2980°N 3.0227°W

Norton
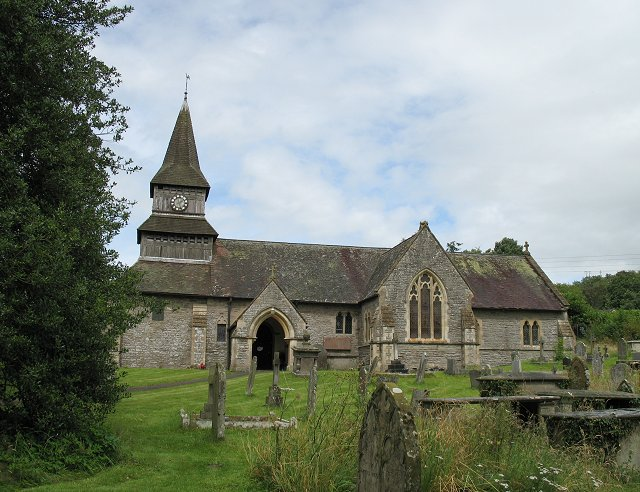
- St Andrews Church

- Location within Powys
- OS grid reference: SO302670
- Community: Presteigne
- Principal area: Powys
- Preserved county: Powys
- Country: Wales
- Sovereign state: United Kingdom
- Post town: PRESTEIGNE
- Postcode district: LD8
- Dialling code: 01544
- Police: Dyfed-Powys
- Fire: Mid and West Wales
- Ambulance: Welsh
- UK Parliament: Brecon, Radnor and Cwm Tawe
- Senedd Cymru – Welsh Parliament: Brecon & Radnorshire

Norton is a village in Presteigne community, Powys, within the historic boundaries of Radnorshire, Wales. In 1086, Norton was recorded as a settlement within the hundred of Leintwardine and in the county of Shropshire in the Domesday Book.

Norton is approximately 2 miles (3.2 km) north of Presteigne.

Norton was a civil parish, at the 1971 census (the last before the abolition of the parish), Norton had a population of 250. In 1974 Norton became a community, on 1 April 1983 the community was abolished.
