= Brecon East =

Coordinates: 51.946°N 3.377°W

- Electoral ward
- Location within Powys
- Population: 3,111 (St Mary ward, 2011 census)
- Principal area: Powys
- Country: Wales
- Sovereign state: United Kingdom
- Post town: BRECON
- Dialling code: 01874
- UK Parliament: Brecon, Radnor and Cwm Tawe
- Senedd Cymru – Welsh Parliament: Brecon & Radnorshire
- Councillors: 1 (County); 5 (Town Council)

Brecon East (Welsh: Dwyrain Aberhonddu), formerly St Mary, is an electoral ward in the town of Brecon, Powys, Wales. It covers the town centre and elects councillors to Brecon Town Council and Powys County Council.

== Description ==
The Brecon East ward covers the town centre of Brecon, the residential areas stretching east to the junction with the A470 and the rural area around Slwch Farm. The southern border is defined by the River Usk. Brecon West lies to the west, Yscir with Honddu Isaf and Llanddew to the north and Talybont-on-Usk to the southwest.

Since the 1999 elections the St Mary ward elected one county councillor to Powys County Council (prior to this it had elected two county councillors). It covers the St Mary community ward, represented by up to five town councillors on Brecon Town Council, and the St John East ward represented by 3 town councillors.

According to the 2011 UK Census the population of the St Mary ward was 3,111.

In 2018 a Review of Electoral Arrangements proposed that all three Brecon county wards be merged into a single, three councillor ward. However, Brecon was divided into two wards, with the St John East community ward added to the St Mary ward to create Brecon East, represented by two county councillors.

== County Council elections ==
Prior to 2003 St Mary ward had been represented by Independents.

Liberal Democrat Paul Ashton represented St Mary ward from a by-election in 2003, retained his seat unopposed at the 2004 election and winning in 2008 and 2012. He became Chair of the county council in 2015. He did not re-stand in 2017.

At the May 2017 Powys County Council elections the St Mary ward was won from the Liberal Democrats by Sarah Lewis of the Conservatives. However Cllr Lewis resigned in October 2019, in the resulting by-election the seat was won by Labour Party candidate Liz Rijnenberg.

At the May 2022 local election Liz Rijnenberg and Chris Walsh, both Labour, were elected for the new Brecon East ward.
