= Newtown and Llanllwchaiarn =

Coordinates: 52.5184°N 3.3146°W

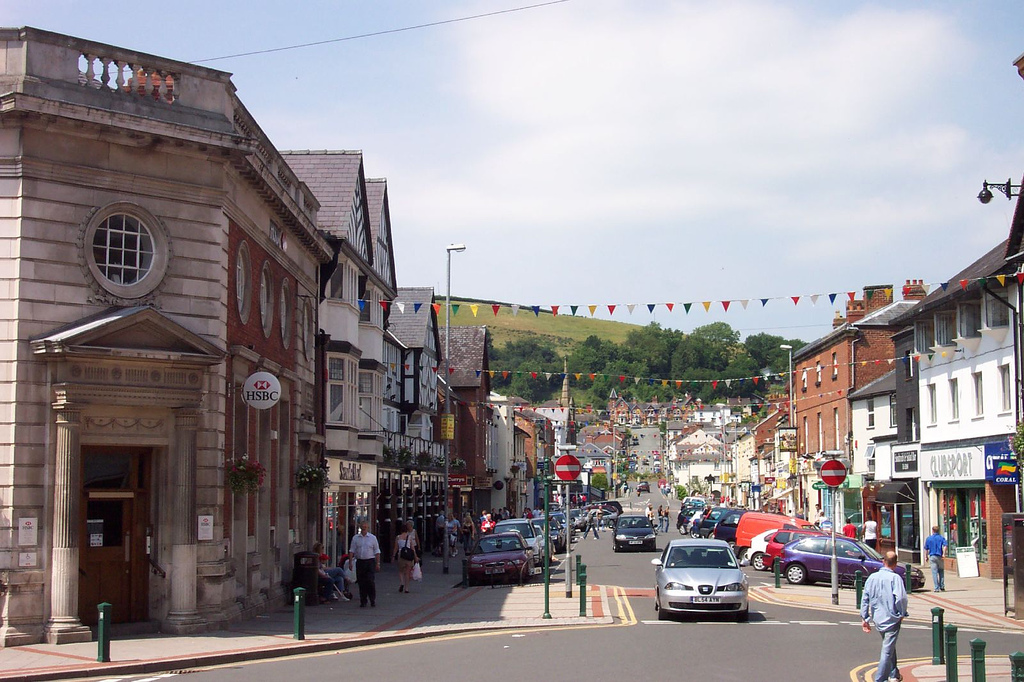
- Newtown
- Population: 11,357 (2011 census)
- Community: Newtown and Llanllwchaiarn
- Principal area: Powys
- Country: Wales
- Sovereign state: United Kingdom
- List of places UK Wales Powys Map of the community

Newtown and Llanllwchaiarn (Welsh: Y Drenewydd a Llanllwchaearn) is a community in mid Powys, Wales. It includes the town of Newtown and the small neighbouring village of Llanllwchaiarn. At the time of the 2011 census the population of the community was 11,357. The community council is called Newtown and Llanllwchaiarn Town Council, often abbreviated to Newtown Town Council.

== History ==
The community has its origins in the Newtown Local Government District, which was established on 25 July 1866. The district was governed by a local board, and from the outset its territory covered parts of the two parishes of Newtown and Llanllwchaiarn. By 1871 the district had become known as the Newtown and Llanllwchaiarn district. Under the Local Government Act 1894 such local government districts were reconstituted as urban districts with effect from 31 December 1894. The Newtown and Llanllwchaiarn Urban District Council held its first meeting on 4 January 1895 when Alfred Ford, a Liberal, was appointed the first chairman of the council. Llanllwchaiarn and Newtown remained separate civil parishes, but were classed as "urban parishes" and so did not have parish councils of their own, with the Newtown and Llanllwchaiarn Urban District Council being the lowest level representative body.

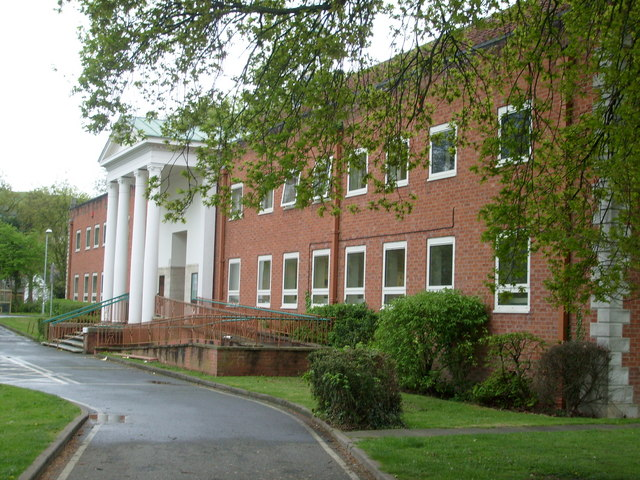
Former Urban District Council Offices in Newtown Hall Park, now an area office for Powys County Council

In the 1968 the urban district council and its neighbour, Newtown and Llanidloes Rural District Council, built a shared headquarters building in Newtown Hall Park, on the site of a large Victorian house called Newtown Hall (which was itself a replacement for an earlier house on the site). The building cost £86,000 and was initially known as "Town Hall".

Newtown and Llanllwchaiarn Urban District was abolished under the Local Government Act 1972, becoming part of the Montgomery district of Powys on 1 April 1974. A new community was created covering the former urban district, with its council taking the name Newtown and Llanllwchaiarn Town Council, also known as Newtown Town Council. The former Town Hall in Newtown Hall Park was used as an area office by Montgomery District Council and then became an area office for Powys County Council, called the Park Office.

== Town council ==
Newtown and Llanllwchaiarn Town Council

Type
- Type: Town council

History
- Founded: 1 April 1974

Leadership
- Mayor: Peter Lewington (2024-)
- Seats: 16

Elections
- Last election: 2022 Welsh local elections
- Next election: 2027 Welsh local elections

Meeting place
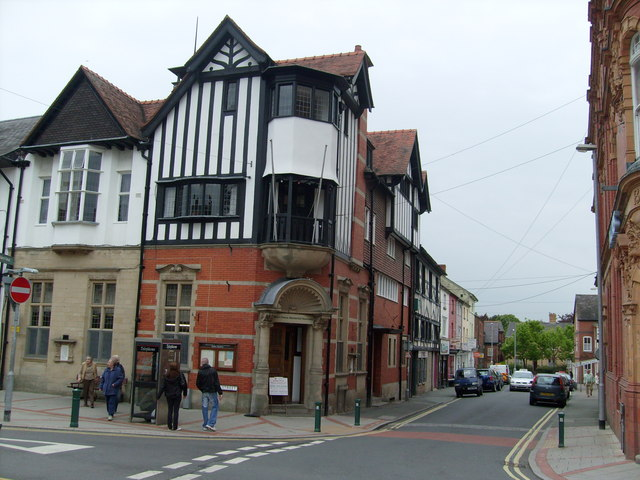
- Brisco House, Broad Street, Newtown

Website
- newtown.org.uk/town-council-home-page

Newtown and Llanllwchaiarn Town Council (commonly called Newtown Town Council) was established in 1974. The community elects up to sixteen members to the town council, from five wards of Llanllwchaiarn North, Llanllwchaiarn West, Newtown Central, Newtown East, Newtown South.

The town has an annual 'mayor making' event where the new town mayor takes their oath of office and gives out awards.

The council's headquarters are at Brisco House in Broad Street. The building dates from 1902 and also houses Newtown's Robert Owen Museum.

In May 2018 the town council backed a proposal to name the town's by-pass after social reformer Robert Owen. The following month it backed plans to place statues on the town's roundabouts, of 'Powys Pioneers'.

In May 2021 the town council elected its youngest mayor, Richard Williams, who was aged 26 at the time of his appointment.

=== Elections ===
At the May 2017 town council elections only the Llanllwchaiarn West ward held a contest, with four candidates competing for the three seats.

At the May 2022 town council elections, no seats were required to have an election and all councillors were elected unopposed. There were 6 vacancies following the election.
