= Llandrindod East/West =

Coordinates: 52.2420°N 3.3810°W

Llandrindod East/Llandrindod West
- Electoral ward
- Location within Powys
- Population: 1,227 (2011 census)
- Principal area: Powys
- Country: Wales
- Sovereign state: United Kingdom
- Post town: LLANDRINDOD WELLS
- Dialling code: 01597
- UK Parliament: Brecon, Radnor and Cwm Tawe
- Senedd Cymru – Welsh Parliament: Brecon & Radnorshire
- Councillors: 4 (Town Council)

Llandrindod East/Llandrindod West (commonly Llandrindod East/West) was the name of an electoral ward in the town of Llandrindod Wells, Powys, Wales. It was abolished in 2022, and merged with Llandrindod South.

== Description ==
Llandrindod East/West covered the town centre of Llandrindod Wells, including the High Street, Ysgol Calon Cymru (Llandrindod Campus), railway station and hospital. The West border was defined by the River Ithon and to the south by the Arlais Brook. The ward of Llandrindod South lay to the south, Llandrindod North to the north and Llanyre to the west.

The ward elected one county councillor to Powys County Council. The East and West community wards are represented by up to two town councillors each on Llandrindod Wells Town Council.

According to the 2011 UK Census the population of the ward was 1,227.

Following the end of the 2017-22 Local Government (Powys County Council) term, the ward was abolished and merged with Llandrindod Wells South Ward. The South Ward gained an extra councillor, bringing the total to 2, however keeping the total for the town at 3.

== County Council elections ==
At the May 2017 Powys County Council elections, Llandrindod East/West was won by Jon Williams, the town's mayor at the time, from the sitting Independent councillor Keith Tampin. Tampin had been Chair of Powys County Council since May 2016. He had represented Llandrindod East/West since the 2012 elections, but had previously been elected to the Llandrindod North ward in 2004 and 2008.

The Llandrindod East/West ward had been represented by Independent councillors since 1995.
