= Glasbury (electoral ward) =

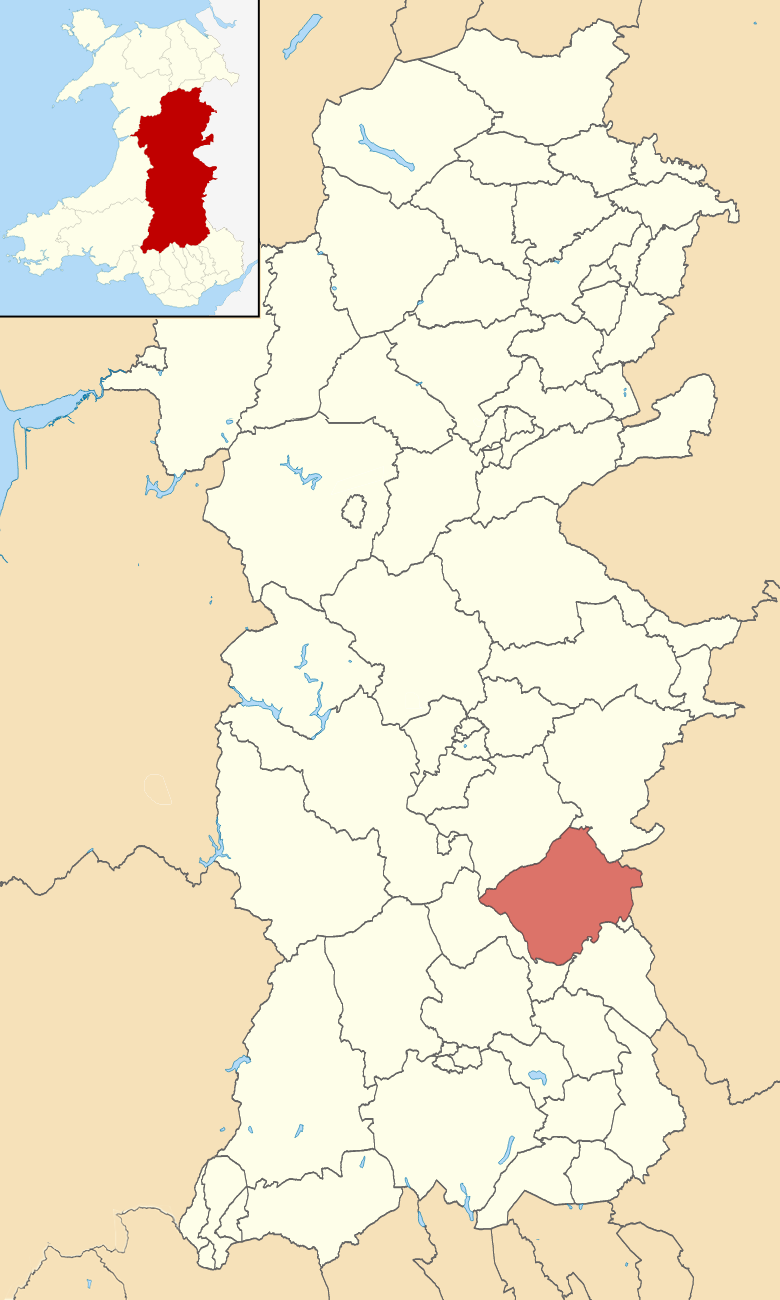
Glasbury ward location in Powys, Wales

Glasbury is an electoral ward in central Powys, Wales. It covers the community of Glasbury (which contains part of the village of the same name) as well as the neighbouring communities of Clyro and Painscastle. The ward elects a county councillor to Powys County Council.

According to the 2011 census the population of the ward was 2,299.

== County councillors ==
Independent councillor Margaret Morris represented the ward on Powys County Council until May 2012, when the seat was won by Christopher Davies for the Welsh Conservative Party. Cllr Davies stood down in 2015 after being elected as the Member of Parliament (MP) for Brecon and Radnorshire.

A by-election was subsequently held in Glasbury on 13 August 2015, resulting in the new Conservative candidate being beaten by the Liberal Democrat candidate, James Gibson-Watt. Gibson-Watt had previously represented Hay-on-Wye until 2004 and had been leader of the Liberal Democrats on the county council.

Cllr Gibson-Watt successfully defended the seat at the May 2017 and May 2022 elections.

2022 Powys County Council election
| Party | Candidate | Votes | % | ±% |
|---|---|---|---|---|
| Liberal Democrats | James Gibson-Watt* | 561 | 65.1 | N/A |
| Conservative | Rhodri Boosey | 300 | 34.9 | N/A |
| Majority | | 261 | 30.2 | |
| Turnout | | 861 | 60 | |

2017 Powys County Council election
| Party | Candidate | Votes | % | ±% |
|---|---|---|---|---|
| Liberal Democrats | James Gibson-Watt * | 725 | 66.7% | |
| Conservative | Alan Hood | 358 | 32.9% | |
| Turnout | | 1087 | 59% | |

2015 Glasbury by-election
| Party | Candidate | Votes | % | ±% |
|---|---|---|---|---|
| Liberal Democrats | James Gibson-Watt | 457 | 44.4% | |
| Conservative | James Evans | 415 | 40.3% | |
| Independent | David Hood | 106 | 10.3% | |
| Green | Louise Davies | 52 | 5.0% | |
| Turnout | | | 56.5% | |

2012 Powys County Council election
| Party | Candidate | Votes | % | ±% |
|---|---|---|---|---|
| Conservative | Christopher Paul Davies | 502 | | |
| Independent | Margaret Elizabeth Morris * | 299 | | |
| Independent | David Roger Hood | 180 | | |

* = sitting councillor prior to the election
