= Llanfihangel Rhydithon =

Llanfihangel Rhydithon: Welsh: Llanfihangel Rhydeithon
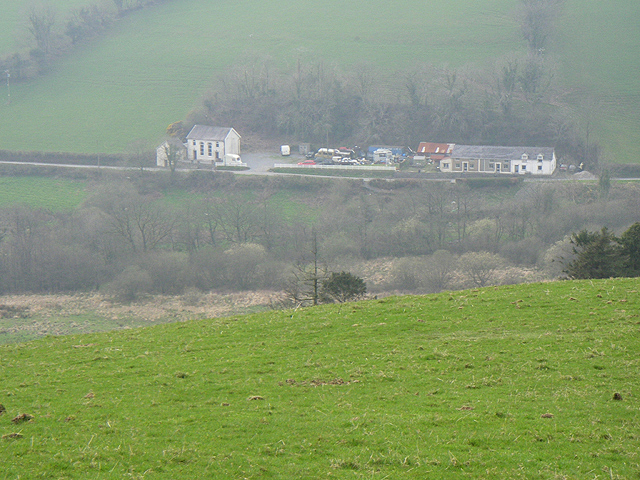
- Population: 228
- OS grid reference: SO 152 666
  - Cardiff: 56.1 mi (90.3 km)
  - London: 143.5 mi (230.9 km)
- Community: Llanfihangel Rhydithon
- Principal area: Powys
- Country: Wales
- Sovereign state: United Kingdom
- Post town: Llandrindod Wells
- Postcode district: LD1
- Police: Dyfed-Powys
- Fire: Mid and West Wales
- Ambulance: Welsh
- List of places UK Wales Powys 52.291379°N 3.24538°W Map of the community

Llanfihangel Rhydithon (Welsh: Llanfihangel Rhydeithon) is a community in the county of Powys, (Radnorshire) Wales, and is 56.1 miles (90.3 km) from Cardiff and 143.5 miles (231.0 km) from London. In 2011 the population of Llanfihangel Rhydithon was 228 with 6.7% of them able to speak Welsh.

The community includes the village of Dolau and also has many round barrows dating back to the Iron Age.

== See also ==
- List of localities in Wales by population
