= 1995 Powys County Council election =

1995 Welsh local government election

The first election to the Powys County Council following local government reorganisation was held in May 1995. It was followed by the 1999 election.

== Results Overview ==
Independents won an overwhelming majority on the Council.

Powys County Council election result 1995
Party	Seats	Gains	Losses	Net gain/loss	Seats %	Votes %	Votes	+/−
Labour	10						4,557	
Conservative	3						1,202	
Liberal Democrats	8						4,223	
Plaid Cymru	1						541	
Independent	62							
Green							999	

== Ward Results (Brecknockshire) ==
=== Aber-craf (one seat) ===
Aber-craf 1995
Party	Candidate	Votes	%	±%
Labour	Cyril Gwyn Gwillim*	unopposed		
Labour win (new seat)				

=== Builth (one seat) ===
Builth 1995
Party	Candidate	Votes	%	±%
Independent	L. Jarman-Harris*	505		
Green	R. Bramhall	397		
Majority				
Turnout				
Independent win (new seat)				

=== Bwlch (one seat) ===
Bwlch 1995
Party	Candidate	Votes	%	±%
Independent	Betty Lucille Greet	unopposed		
Independent win (new seat)				

=== Crickhowell (two seats) ===
Crickhowell 1995
Party	Candidate	Votes	%	±%
Independent	Thomas John Probert*	644		
Conservative	M. Taylor	517		
Independent	H.E. Francis*	414		
Labour	G.R. Strange	354		
Independent win (new seat)				
Conservative win (new seat)				

=== Cwmtwrch (one seat) ===
Cwmtwrch 1995
Party	Candidate	Votes	%	±%
Labour	Bryan Wyn Davies*	unopposed		
Labour win (new seat)				

=== Felin-fach (one seat) ===
Felin-fach 1995
Party	Candidate	Votes	%	±%
Independent	H Jean Whittall	unopposed		
Independent win (new seat)				

=== Gwernyfed (one seat) ===
Gwernyfed 1995
Party	Candidate	Votes	%	±%
Independent	O.V. James*	375		
Independent	K.M. Griffiths*	275		
Majority		100		
Turnout				
Independent win (new seat)				

=== Hay (one seat) ===
Hay 1995
Party	Candidate	Votes	%	±%
Independent	J.M. Like*	384		
Independent	R.G.W. Booth	342		
Majority				
Turnout				
Independent win (new seat)				

=== Llanafanfawr, Erwood (one seat) ===
Llanafanfawr, Erwood 1995
Party	Candidate	Votes	%	±%
Independent	David Eiros Davies*	411		
Independent	E.T.R. Jones*	367		
Majority				
Turnout				
Independent win (new seat)				

=== Llanfyrnach, Talybont-on-Usk (one seat) ===
Llanfyrnach, Talybont-on-Usk 1995
Party	Candidate	Votes	%	±%
Independent	D.M.J. James	unopposed		
Independent win (new seat)				

=== Llangammarch, Llanwrtyd Wells (one seat) ===
Llangammarch, Llanwrtyd Wells 1995
Party	Candidate	Votes	%	±%
Independent	Timothy John Van Rees*	576		
Independent	I.D. Jones*	277		
Majority				
Turnout				
Independent win (new seat)				

=== Llangattock (one seat) ===
Llangattock
Party	Candidate	Votes	%	±%
Independent	Rowland Edgar Price Williams*	unopposed		
Majority				
Turnout				
Independent win (new seat)				

=== Llangors (one seat) ===
Llangors 1995
Party	Candidate	Votes	%	±%
Liberal Democrats	Roger Hugh Williams*	Unopposed	N/A	N/A
Liberal Democrats win (new seat)				

=== Llangynidr (one seat) ===
Llangynidr 1995
Party	Candidate	Votes	%	±%
Independent	E. Meredith*	unopposed		
Independent win (new seat)				

=== Maescar / Llywel (one seat) ===
Maescar / Llywel 1995
Party	Candidate	Votes	%	±%
Independent	Evan Thomas Morgan*	522		
Independent	H.G. Jones*	394		
Majority				
Turnout				
Independent win (new seat)				

=== St Davids Within (one seat) ===
St Davids Within 1995
Party	Candidate	Votes	%	±%
Independent	Marilyn Roberts*	675		
Independent	S. Cholewka	131		
Majority				
Turnout				
Independent win (new seat)				

=== St John (two seats) ===
St John 1995
Party	Candidate	Votes	%	±%
Labour	Christopher John Mann*	811		
Liberal Democrats	Anthony Mark Morgan*	625		
Independent	E.I. Bassin*	613		
Liberal Democrats	D.J. Leboff	176		
Turnout				
Labour win (new seat)				
Liberal Democrats win (new seat)				

=== St Mary (two seats) ===
St Mary 1995
Party	Candidate	Votes	%	±%
Independent	P.M. Norbury*	748		
Independent	Susan Dawn Francis*	547		
Liberal Democrats	Anthony Joseph Bell	379		
Labour	O.C. Williams	358		
Turnout				
Independent win (new seat)				
Independent win (new seat)				

=== Talgarth (two seats) ===
Talgarth 1995
Party	Candidate	Votes	%	±%
Independent	I.B. Lewis*	739		
Independent	H.L. Evans*	593		
Independent	F.E. Hussin	173		
Independent win (new seat)				
Independent win (new seat)				

=== Tawe Uchaf (one seat) ===
Tawe Uchaf 1995
Party	Candidate	Votes	%	±%
Labour	J.M. Jones*	495		
Independent Labour	H. Pattrick*	359		
Liberal Democrats	D.C. Evans	218		
Majority				
Turnout				
Labour win (new seat)				

=== Ynyscedwyn (one seat) ===
Ynyscedwyn 1995
Party	Candidate	Votes	%	±%
Labour	V.J. Gibbs	659		
Independent	J.L. Clee	456		
Majority				
Turnout				
Labour win (new seat)				

=== Yscir (one seat) ===
Yscir 1995
Party	Candidate	Votes	%	±%
Independent	Dorothy Gillian Thomas*	273		
Independent	A.M. Leonard*	215		
Majority		58		
Turnout				
Independent win (new seat)				

=== Ystradgynlais (two seats) ===
Ystradgynlais 1995
Party	Candidate	Votes	%	±%
Labour	E.B.L. James*	unopposed		
Labour	B.R. Watkins*	unopposed		
Turnout				
Labour win (new seat)				
Labour win (new seat)				

== Ward Results (Montgomeryshire) ==
=== Banwy (one seat) ===
Banwy 1995
Party	Candidate	Votes	%	±%
Independent	D.K. Roberts	214		
Independent	R.G. Bebb*	210		
Majority		4		
Turnout				
Independent win (new seat)				

=== Berriew (one seat) ===
Berriew 1995
Party	Candidate	Votes	%	±%
Independent	S.G. Pritchard*	unopposed		
Independent win (new seat)				

=== Caersws, Carno (one seat) ===
Caersws, Carno 1995
Party	Candidate	Votes	%	±%
Independent	E.E. Davies*	unopposed		
Independent win (new seat)				

=== Churchstoke (one seat) ===
Churchstoke 1995
Party	Candidate	Votes	%	±%
Independent	G.C. Hamer	337		
Independent	W.S. Morgan	211		
Majority				
Turnout				
Independent win (new seat)				

=== Dolforwyn (one seat) ===
Dolforwyn 1995
Party	Candidate	Votes	%	±%
Conservative	D.G. Edwards*	unopposed		
Conservative win (new seat)				

=== Forden (one seat) ===
Forden 1995
Party	Candidate	Votes	%	±%
Independent	F.J. Owens*	unopposed		
Independent win (new seat)				

=== Glantwymyn, Cadfarch (one seat) ===
Glantwymyn, Cadfarch 1995
Party	Candidate	Votes	%	±%
Independent	Gwilym Pughe Vaughan*	715		
Independent	D.L. James*	210		
Majority		505		
Turnout				
Independent win (new seat)				

=== Guilsfield Within (one seat) ===
Guilsfield Within 1995
Party	Candidate	Votes	%	±%
Independent	F.G. Palin*	240		
Independent	H. Woodcock	156		
Majority				
Turnout				
Independent win (new seat)				

=== Guilsfield Without (one seat) ===
Guilsfield Without 1995
Party	Candidate	Votes	%	±%
Independent	D.R. Jones*	unopposed		
Independent win (new seat)				

=== Kerry (one seat) ===
Kerry 1995
Party	Candidate	Votes	%	±%
Liberal Democrats	M.I. Brench*	unopposed		
Liberal Democrats win (new seat)				

=== Llanbrynmair (one seat) ===
Llanbrynmair 1995
Party	Candidate	Votes	%	±%
Independent	Hedd Bleddyn Williams*	unopposed		
Independent win (new seat)				

=== Llandinam (one seat) ===
Llandinam 1995
Party	Candidate	Votes	%	±%
Independent	L.R.E. Davies			
Independent	G.A Sylvester			
Majority				
Turnout				
Independent win (new seat)				

=== Llandrinio (one seat) ===
Llandrinio 1995
Party	Candidate	Votes	%	±%
Independent	Richard Graham Brown*	unopposed		
Independent win (new seat)				

=== Llandysilio (one seat) ===
Llandysilio 1995
Party	Candidate	Votes	%	±%
Independent	J.H. Evans*	unopposed		
Independent win (new seat)				

=== Llanfair Caereinion (one seat) ===
Llanfair Caereinion 1995
Party	Candidate	Votes	%	±%
Liberal Democrats	E.B. Bennett*	307		
Independent	R.B. Jones	253		
Majority				
Turnout				
Liberal Democrats win (new seat)				

=== Llanfihangel (one seat) ===
Llanfihangel 1995
Party	Candidate	Votes	%	±%
Independent	William Barry Thomas	287		
Independent	T. Jones*	207		
Majority				
Turnout				
Independent win (new seat)				

=== Llanfyllin (one seat) ===
Llanfyllin 1995
Party	Candidate	Votes	%	±%
Independent	J.E. Bowen*	389		
Independent	T.O. Lewis*	132		
Independent	D.B. Goodman	87		
Independent	H.G. Rees	47		
Majority				
Turnout				
Independent win (new seat)				

=== Llanidloes (two seats) ===
Llanidloes 1995
Party	Candidate	Votes	%	±%
Liberal Democrats	Gareth Morgan*	883		
Independent	V.W. Hollis*	720		
Labour	M. Evitts	346		
Green	S.M. Walker	201		
Turnout				
Liberal Democrats win (new seat)				
Independent win (new seat)				

=== Llanrhaeadr-ym-Mochnant (one seat) ===
Llanrhaeadr-ym-Mochnant 1995
Party	Candidate	Votes	%	±%
Labour	C.A. O'Connor	356		
Independent	R.W. Edwards	282		
Independent	J.H. Hughes	156		
Majority				
Turnout				
Labour win (new seat)				

=== Llansantffraid (one seat) ===
Llansantffraid 1995
Party	Candidate	Votes	%	±%
Independent	N. Roberts*	unopposed		
Independent win (new seat)				

=== Llanwddyn (one seat) ===
Llanwddyn 1995
Party	Candidate	Votes	%	±%
Independent	G.T. Tibbott*	unopposed		
Independent win (new seat)				

=== Machynlleth (one seat) ===
Machynlleth 1995
Party	Candidate	Votes	%	±%
Independent	J.M. Williams*	unopposed		
Independent win (new seat)				

=== Meifod (one seat) ===
Meifod 1995
Party	Candidate	Votes	%	±%
Liberal Democrats	H.L. Gwalchmai	245		
Independent	O.M. Dodd	135		
Majority				
Turnout				
Liberal Democrats win (new seat)				

=== Mochdre (one seat) ===
Mochdre 1995
Party	Candidate	Votes	%	±%
Independent	D.M. Jones*	unopposed		
Independent win (new seat)				

=== Montgomery (one seat) ===
Montgomery 1995
Party	Candidate	Votes	%	±%
Independent	B.P. Richards*	247		
Independent	G.W. Roberts	189		
Majority				
Turnout				
Independent win (new seat)				

=== Newtown Central (two seats) ===
Newtown Central 1995
Party	Candidate	Votes	%	±%
Plaid Cymru	Reg Taylor*	367		
Independent	J.W. Griffiths	297		
Independent	N.P. Jackson*	281		
Independent	V.A. Moore	236		
Liberal Democrats	J.D. Napier*	198		
Turnout				
Plaid Cymru win (new seat)				
Independent win (new seat)				

=== Newtown East (one seat) ===
Newtown East 1995
Party	Candidate	Votes	%	±%
Liberal Democrats	L.H. Williams*	219		
Labour	R.J. Lloyd	124		
Plaid Cymru	S.A. Frisby	59		
Majority				
Turnout				
Liberal Democrats win (new seat)				

=== Newtown Llanllwchaiaran North (one seat) ===
Newtown Llanllwchaiaran North 1995
Party	Candidate	Votes	%	±%
Independent	K. Jones*	625		
Plaid Cymru	G. Murray	40		
Majority				
Turnout				
Independent win (new seat)				

=== Newtown Llanllwchaiaran West ===
Newtown Llanllwchaiaran West 1995
Party	Candidate	Votes	%	±%
Independent	K. Moris	194		
Plaid Cymru	G.E. Jones	183		
Majority				
Turnout				
Independent win (new seat)				

=== Newtown South (one seat) ===
Newtown South 1995
Party	Candidate	Votes	%	±%
Independent	J.A. Dean Mackeen*	213		
Liberal Democrats	I.B. Barclay*	205		
Plaid Cymru	R.G. Edwards	53		
Majority				
Turnout				
Independent win (new seat)				

=== Rhiwcynon (one seat) ===
Rhiwcynon 1995
Party	Candidate	Votes	%	±%
Independent	Joy P. Shearer*	unopposed		
Independent win (new seat)				

=== Trefeglwys, Llangurig (one seat) ===
Trefeglwys, Llangurig 1995
Party	Candidate	Votes	%	±%
Independent	G.T. Evans*	unopposed		
Independent win (new seat)				

=== Trewern (one seat) ===
Trewern 1995
Party	Candidate	Votes	%	±%
Independent	P.E. Astley*	330		
Conservative	M.L.G. Robinson	129		
Majority				
Turnout				
Independent win (new seat)				

=== Welshpool Castle (one seat) ===
Welshpool Castle 1995
Party	Candidate	Votes	%	±%
Independent	J.S.R. Watson	unopposed		
Independent win (new seat)				

=== Welshpool Gungrog (one seat) ===
Welshpool Gungrog 1995
Party	Candidate	Votes	%	±%
Labour	G.E.H. Taylor*	430		
Independent	J.A. Corfield	301		
Majority				
Turnout				
Labour win (new seat)				

=== Welshpool Llanerchyddol (one seat) ===
Welshpool Llanerchyddol 1995
Party	Candidate	Votes	%	±%
Independent	Ann Holloway*	402		
Liberal Democrats	M.S. Squibb*	314		
Labour	A.G.D. Swift	88		
Independent	J.D. Moris	75		
Majority				
Turnout				
Independent win (new seat)				

== Ward Results (Radnorshire) ==
=== Clyro, Painscastle (one seat) ===
Clyro, Painscastle 1995
Party	Candidate	Votes	%	±%
Liberal Democrats	C.J. Gibson-Watt	284		
Independent	R.C. Bagley*	218		
Independent	R. Bailey*	108		
Majority				
Turnout				
Liberal Democrats win (new seat)				

=== Disserth and Trecoed (one seat) ===
Disserth and Trecoed 1995
Party	Candidate	Votes	%	±%
Labour	P.D. Speake	202		
Independent	D.L. Hughes-Jones*	184		
Green	R.G. Prince	60		
Majority				
Turnout				
Labour win (new seat)				

=== Glasbury (one seat) ===
Glasbury 1995
Party	Candidate	Votes	%	±%
Independent	Margaret Elizabeth Morris	unopposed		
Independent win (new seat)				

=== Glascwm, Llanelwedd (one seat) ===
Glascwm, Llanelwedd 1995
Party	Candidate	Votes	%	±%
Independent	G.M. Worts	258		
Liberal Democrats	E. Morgan	251		
Green	H.W. Richards	127		
Independent win (new seat)				

=== Knighton (two seats) ===
Knighton 1995
Party	Candidate	Votes	%	±%
Independent	M.W. Shaw*	962		
Conservative	T.A. Johnson*	556		
Independent	E. Petley*	451		
Labour	K.J. Kell*	334		
Independent	P.J. Waters	227		
Turnout				
Independent win (new seat)				
Conservative win (new seat)				

=== Llanbadarn Fawr (one seat) ===
Llanbadarn Fawr 1995
Party	Candidate	Votes	%	±%
Independent	Fred Barker*	401		
Independent	M.G. Lewis	193		
Majority				
Turnout				
Independent win (new seat)				

=== Llanbister, Beguildy (one seat) ===
Llanbister, Beguildy 1995
Party	Candidate	Votes	%	±%
Independent	A.V. Allen*	584		
Independent	W.V.S. Corbett*	149		
Majority				
Turnout				
Independent win (new seat)				

=== Llandrindod East/West (one seat) ===
Llandrindod East/West 1995
Party	Candidate	Votes	%	±%
Independent	M.C. Lennox-Boyd*	215		
Independent	K.J. Richards	204		
Green	K.W. Curry*	122		
Plaid Cymru	Sian Maredudd	22		
Majority				
Turnout				
Independent win (new seat)				

=== Llandrindod North (one seat) ===
Llandrindod North 1995
Party	Candidate	Votes	%	±%
Independent	R.W. Bevan*	470		
Independent	A.M. Nicholas*	191		
Majority				
Turnout				
Independent win (new seat)				

=== Llandrindod South (one seat) ===
Llandrindod South 1995
Party	Candidate	Votes	%	±%
Independent	E.B. Oakley	331		
Liberal Democrats	D.V. Law	293		
Independent	C.B. Davies*	202		
Green	A.M. Walker	48		
Majority				
Turnout				
Independent win (new seat)				

=== Llanfihangel Rhuditon, Llangunllo (one seat) ===
Llanfihangel Rhuditon, Llangunllo 1995
Party	Candidate	Votes	%	±%
Independent	Emlyn Kinsey Pugh*	280		
Independent	W.G. Lewis	256		
Independent	P.G. Harrison*	157		
Majority				
Turnout				
Independent win (new seat)				

=== Llanyre (one seat) ===
Llanyre 1995
Party	Candidate	Votes	%	±%
Independent	J.D.A. Thompson*	unopposed		
Independent win (new seat)				

=== Old Radnor, New Radnor, Gladestry (one seat) ===
Old Radnor, New Radnor, Gladestry 1995
Party	Candidate	Votes	%	±%
Independent	M. Jones*	376		
Independent	M.B. Gwatkin	277		
Majority				
Turnout				
Independent win (new seat)				

=== Presteigne (one seat) ===
Presteigne 1995
Party	Candidate	Votes	%	±%
Independent	Garry Richard Banks*	660		
Independent	E.M. Davies*	437		
Majority				
Turnout				
Independent win (new seat)				

=== Rhayader (one seat) ===
Rhayader 1995
Party	Candidate	Votes	%	±%
Independent	John Andreas Bufton	503		
Independent	M.A. Pugh*	401		
Independent	J.L. Davies*	143		
Green	J.E. Davis	44		
Independent	D.H. Stephens	10		
Majority				
Turnout				
Independent win (new seat)				

=== St Harmon, Nantmel (one seat) ===
St Harmon, Nantmel 1995
Party	Candidate	Votes	%	±%
Independent	L.V. Lewis	248		
Independent	W.A. Lewis	245		
Independent	D.O. Evans	157		
Independent	E.F. Phillips	114		
Majority				
Turnout				
Independent win (new seat)				
