= 2012 Powys County Council election =

2012 Welsh local government election

Map of the results of the 2012 Powys County Council election.

The fifth election to the Powys County Council since local government reorganization in Wales in 1995 was held on 1 May 2012. It was preceded by the 2008 election and was followed by the 2017 election. The Independent group retained a majority on the authority

== Results Overview ==
Independents Retained Overall control.

Powys County Council election result 2012
Party	Seats	Gains	Losses	Net gain/loss	Seats %	Votes %	Votes	+/−
Independent	48			+3	65.8	51.9	16,938	-1.3
Liberal Democrats	9			-6	12.3	19.1	6,244	-2.8
Conservative	10			+1	13.7	18.8	6,152	-0.9
Labour	6			+2	8.2	9.1	2,956	+4.7
Christian	0			0	0.0	0.3	104	New
Plaid Cymru	0			0	0.0	0.3	87	-0.1

== Ward Results (Brecknockshire) ==
=== Aber-craf (one seat) ===
Incumbent elected unopposed at last election (not standing again)

Aber-craf 2012
Party	Candidate	Votes	%	±%
Labour	Sarah Louise Williams	387	69.9	N/A
Independent	Alun Thomas	87	15.7	N/A
Liberal Democrats	Aubrey Jenkins	80	14.4	N/A
Majority		300	54.2	N/A
Turnout		554	49.0	N/A
Labour hold		Swing	N/A	

=== Bronllys (one seat) ===
Bronllys 2012
Party	Candidate	Votes	%	±%
Independent	Stephen Davies	174	30.9	−4.2
Independent	Karen Elizabeth Laurie-Parry	173	30.7	+30.7
Independent	Sue Richards	94	16.7	+16.7
Conservative	Liz Davies	64	11.3	−8.8
Liberal Democrats	Terry Hurford	59	10.5	−34.3
Majority		1	0.2	−9.5
Turnout		564	58.0	−1.1
Independent gain from Liberal Democrats		Swing	-17.5	

=== Builth (one seat) ===
Builth 2012
Party	Candidate	Votes	%	±%
Independent	Avril York*	362	63.2	−2.0
Liberal Democrats	Megan Jane Lloyd	211	36.8	+36.8
Majority		151	26.4	−4.0
Turnout		573	31.0	−19.3
Independent hold		Swing	-19.4	

=== Bwlch (one seat) ===
Bwlch 2012
Party	Candidate	Votes	%	±%
Liberal Democrats	Kathryn Susan Silk*	301	80.7	+20.0
Conservative	Mary Fellowes	72	19.3	−20.0
Majority		229	61.4	+40.0
Turnout		373	61.4	+40.0
Liberal Democrats hold		Swing	+20.0	

=== Crickhowell (one seat) ===
Crickhowell 2012
Party	Candidate	Votes	%	±%
Liberal Democrats	John Gerwyn Morris*	unopposed		
Liberal Democrats hold		Swing		

=== Cwmtwrch (one seat) ===
Cwmtwrch 2012
Party	Candidate	Votes	%	±%
Labour	Sandra Christine Davies*	unopposed		
Labour hold		Swing		

=== Felin-fach (one seat) ===
Felin-fach 2012
Party	Candidate	Votes	%	±%
Independent	Tony Thomas*	274	53.1	+9.2
Conservative	John Pratt	194	37.6	+37.6
Labour	Tim Ashcroft	48	9.3	+9.3
Majority		80	15.5	+4.1
Turnout		516	47.3	−2.8
Independent hold		Swing	-14.2	

=== Gwernyfed (one seat) ===
Incumbent elected unopposed at last election

Gwernyfed 2012
Party	Candidate	Votes	%	±%
Independent	Geraint George Hopkins*	209	44.8	N/A
Conservative	Robert Golesworthy	205	44.0	N/A
Liberal Democrats	Debra Helen Williams	52	11.2	N/A
Majority		4	0.8	N/A
Turnout		466	39.0	N/A
Independent hold		Swing	N/A	

=== Hay (one seat) ===
Hay 2012
Party	Candidate	Votes	%	±%
Conservative	Gareth William Ratcliffe*	unopposed		
Conservative hold		Swing		

=== Llanafanfawr (one seat) ===
Llanafanfawr 2012
Party	Candidate	Votes	%	±%
Independent	David Rowland Price*	unopposed		
Independent hold		Swing		

=== Llangattock (one seat) ===
Jeff Holmes was elected as a Liberal Democrat in 2008.

Llangattock 2012
Party	Candidate	Votes	%	±%
Independent	Jeff Holmes*	215	48.0	+48.0
Liberal Democrats	Jackie Charlton	140	31.3	−19.0
Conservative	Andrew Stuart Lennox	93	20.8	−28.9
Majority		75	16.7	+16.2
Turnout		448	57.6	+13.3
Independent hold		Swing	+33.5	

=== Llangors (one seat) ===
The sitting member was previously a Liberal Democrat. Incumbent elected unopposed at last election.

Llangors 2012
Party	Candidate	Votes	%	±%
Independent	Melanie Jade Brookes Davies*	313	63.4	N/A
Liberal Democrats	David Kenneth Jones	181	36.6	N/A
Majority		132	26.8	N/A
Turnout		494	55.8	N/A
Independent hold		Swing	N/A	

=== Llangynidr (one seat) ===
Llangynidr 2012
Party	Candidate	Votes	%	±%
Independent	Rosemarie Harris	368	80.9	N/A
Liberal Democrats	David Sharman	87	19.1	N/A
Majority		281	61.8	N/A
Turnout		455	55.0	N/A
Independent hold		Swing	N/A	

=== Llanwrtyd Wells (one seat) ===
Llanwrtyd Wells 2012
Party	Candidate	Votes	%	±%
Independent	Timothy John Van Rees*	563	72.8	−3.6
Liberal Democrats	Bernice Benton	210	27.2	+27.2
Majority		353	45.6	−16.0
Turnout		773	53.0	+2.0
Independent hold		Swing	-15.4	

=== Maescar / Llywel (one seat) ===
Maescar / Llywel 2012
Party	Candidate	Votes	%	±%
Independent	Evan Thomas Morgan*	571		
Conservative	Edward Lewis	212		
Majority				
Turnout				
Independent hold		Swing		

=== St Davids Within (one seat) ===
The successful candidate had been elected as an Independent councilor for St John Ward in 2008 but now captured this ward from the Independents

St Davids Within 2012
Party	Candidate	Votes	%	±%
Labour	David William Meredith	218		
Independent	Andrew Martin Charles Weale*	194		
Majority				
Turnout				
Labour gain from Independent		Swing		

=== St John (one seat) ===
St John 2012
Party	Candidate	Votes	%	±%
Labour	Matthew James Dorrance	778		
Independent	Gareth Geoffrey Phillips	158		
Liberal Democrats	Mark Morgan	154		
Majority				
Turnout				
Labour gain from Independent		Swing		

=== St Mary (one seat) ===
St Mary 2012
Party	Candidate	Votes	%	±%
Liberal Democrats	Paul James Ashton*	361		
Conservative	Mary Phillips	301		
Labour	Ieuan Williams	265		
Majority		60		
Turnout				
Liberal Democrats hold		Swing		

=== Talgarth (one seat) ===
Talgarth 2012
Party	Candidate	Votes	%	±%
Liberal Democrats	William Denston Powell*	Unopposed	N/A	N/A
Liberal Democrats hold				

=== Talybont-on-Usk (one seat) ===
The sitting member was elected as a Liberal Democrat in 2008.

Talybont-on-Usk 2012
Party	Candidate	Votes	%	±%
Independent	Liam Fitzpatrick *	331		
Conservative	Jan Harris	240		
Liberal Democrats	Richard Thomas	128		
Majority				
Turnout				
Independent hold		Swing		

=== Tawe Uchaf (one seat) ===
Tawe Uchaf 2012
Party	Candidate	Votes	%	±%
Labour	David Arnold Thomas	506		
Independent	Krish Pathak*	336		
Majority				
Turnout				
Labour gain from Independent		Swing		

=== Ynyscedwyn (one seat) ===
Ynyscedwyn 2012
Party	Candidate	Votes	%	±%
Labour	Susan McNicholas*	unopposed		
Labour hold		Swing		

=== Yscir (one seat) ===
Yscir 2012
Party	Candidate	Votes	%	±%
Independent	Dorothy Gillian Thomas*	255		
Liberal Democrats	John Williams	241		
Majority		14		
Turnout				
Independent hold		Swing		

=== Ystradgynlais (one seat) ===
Ystradgynlais 2012
Party	Candidate	Votes	%	±%
Independent	Hugo Williams	606		
Labour	John Steadman*	378		
Majority				
Turnout				
Independent gain from Labour		Swing		

== Ward Results (Montgomeryshire) ==
=== Banwy (one seat) ===
Banwy 2012
Party	Candidate	Votes	%	±%
Independent	Myfanwy Catherine Alexander	unopposed		
Independent hold		Swing		

=== Berriew (one seat) ===
Berriew 2012
Party	Candidate	Votes	%	±%
Independent	David Edward Davies*	unopposed		
Independent hold		Swing		

=== Blaen Hafren (one seat) ===
Blaen Hafren 2012
Party	Candidate	Votes	%	±%
Conservative	Graham Maurice Jones	unopposed		
Conservative hold		Swing		

=== Caersws (one seat) ===
Caersws 2012
Party	Candidate	Votes	%	±%
Independent	Elizabeth Rachel Davies*	528		
Conservative	Ann Lewis	309		
Majority				
Turnout				
Independent hold		Swing		

=== Churchstoke (one seat) ===
Churchstoke 2012
Party	Candidate	Votes	%	±%
Independent	Michael John Jones*	333		
Liberal Democrats	Rob Harper	273		
Majority				
Turnout				
Independent hold		Swing		

=== Dolforwyn (one seat) ===
Dolforwyn 2012
Party	Candidate	Votes	%	±%
Independent	Wynne Thomas Jones*	405		
Conservative	Ian Christopher Harrison	308		
Independent	John Rowland	63		
Majority				
Turnout				
Independent hold		Swing		

=== Forden (one seat) ===
Forden 2012
Party	Candidate	Votes	%	±%
Independent	Linda Veronica Corfield*	257		
Conservative	Jan Chilton	254		
Majority		3		
Turnout				
Independent hold		Swing		

=== Glantwymyn (one seat) ===
Glantwymyn 2012
Party	Candidate	Votes	%	±%
Independent	Gwilym Pughe Vaughan*	unopposed		
Independent hold		Swing		

=== Guilsfield (one seat) ===
Guilsfield 2012
Party	Candidate	Votes	%	±%
Independent	David Richard Jones*	unopposed		
Independent hold		Swing		

=== Kerry (one seat) ===
Kerry 2012
Party	Candidate	Votes	%	±%
Independent	Kathryn Mary Roberts-Jones*	334		
Conservative	Benjamin John Breeze	308		
Majority				
Turnout				
Independent hold		Swing		

=== Llanbrynmair (one seat) ===
Llanbrynmair 2012
Party	Candidate	Votes	%	±%
Independent	Dai Charles Jones	181		
Independent	Sarah Reast	148		
Conservative	Harry Hughes	81		
Majority				
Turnout				
Independent hold		Swing		

=== Llandinam (one seat) ===
Llandinam 2012
Party	Candidate	Votes	%	±%
Independent	Leonard Roche Elvet Davies*	404		
Independent	Philip Anthony Freeman	219		
Majority				
Turnout				
Independent hold		Swing		

=== Llandrinio (one seat) ===
Llandrinio 2012
Party	Candidate	Votes	%	±%
Independent	Richard Graham Brown*	unopposed		
Independent hold		Swing		

=== Llandysilio (one seat) ===
Llandysilio 2012
Party	Candidate	Votes	%	±%
Independent	Evan Arwel Jones*	348		
Conservative	Leigh Kellaway	87		
Independent	Nick Savage	56		
Majority				
Turnout				
Independent hold		Swing		

=== Llanfair Caereinion (one seat) ===
Llanfair Caereinion 2012
Party	Candidate	Votes	%	±%
Independent	Viola Elizabeth Evans*	300		
Liberal Democrats	Sue Callery	122		
UKIP	Christine Williams	108		
Majority				
Turnout				
Independent hold		Swing		

=== Llanfihangel (one seat) ===
Llanfihangel 2012
Party	Candidate	Votes	%	±%
Independent	William Barry Thomas*	unopposed		
Independent hold		Swing		

=== Llanfyllin (one seat) ===
Llanfyllin 2012
Party	Candidate	Votes	%	±%
Conservative	Peter Edward Lewis*	unopposed		
Conservative hold		Swing		

=== Llanidloes (one seat) ===
Llanidloes 2012
Party	Candidate	Votes	%	±%
Independent	Gareth Morgan*	661		
Conservative	John Whittal-Williams	306		
Majority				
Turnout				
Independent hold		Swing		

=== Llanwddyn (one seat) ===
Llanwddyn 2012
Party	Candidate	Votes	%	±%
Independent	Darren Mayor	unopposed		
Independent hold		Swing		

=== Llanrhaeadr-ym-Mochnant (one seat) ===
Llanrhaeadr-ym-Mochnant 2012
Party	Candidate	Votes	%	±%
Conservative	Aled Wyn Davies*	unopposed		
Conservative hold		Swing		

=== Llansantffraid (one seat) ===
Llansantffraid 2012
Party	Candidate	Votes	%	±%
Conservative	Robert Gwynfor Thomas	441		
Independent	Digby Davies	244		
UKIP	Nick Powell	65		
Majority				
Turnout				
Conservative gain from Independent		Swing		

=== Machynlleth (one seat) ===
Machynlleth 2012
Party	Candidate	Votes	%	±%
Independent	John Michael Williams*	unopposed		
Independent hold		Swing		

=== Meifod (one seat) ===
Meifod 2012
Party	Candidate	Votes	%	±%
Independent	Eldrydd Mary Jones*	unopposed		
Independent hold		Swing		

=== Montgomery (one seat) ===
Montgomery 2012
Party	Candidate	Votes	%	±%
Independent	Stephen Muray Hayes*	374		
Conservative	Nicholas John Bardsley	71		
Majority				
Turnout				
Independent hold		Swing		

=== Newtown Llanllwchaiaran North (one seat) ===
Newtown Llanllwchaiaran North 2012
Party	Candidate	Votes	%	±%
Liberal Democrats	Gemma-Jane Bowker	524		
Conservative	Francis Alexander Torrens*	189		
Majority				
Turnout				
Liberal Democrats gain from Conservative		Swing		

=== Newtown Llanllwchaiaran West ===
Newtown Llanllwchaiaran West 2012
Party	Candidate	Votes	%	±%
Conservative	Peter Harris*	unopposed		
Conservative hold		Swing		

=== Newtown Central (one seat) ===
Newtown Central 2012
Party	Candidate	Votes	%	±%
Conservative	Russell Ian George*	unopposed		
Conservative hold		Swing		

=== Newtown East (one seat) ===
The sitting member had been elected as a Liberal Democrat in 2008 but subsequently joined the Conservatives.

Newtown East 2012
Party	Candidate	Votes	%	±%
Liberal Democrats	Joy Rachel Jones	266		
Conservative	Richard John White*	103		
Plaid Cymru	Richard Gerrard Edwards	87		
Majority				
Turnout				
Liberal Democrats hold		Swing		

=== Newtown South (one seat) ===
Newtown South 2012
Party	Candidate	Votes	%	±%
Independent	Robert Henry Mills	177		
Labour	Matt Tisdale	85		
Liberal Democrats	Philip Bowell Watkins	42		
Conservative	Rex Shayler	27		
Majority				
Turnout				
Independent hold		Swing		

=== Rhiwcynon (one seat) ===
Rhiwcynon 2012
Party	Candidate	Votes	%	±%
Independent	Joyce Gethin Shearer*	487		
Independent	David Lyn Oliver	447		
Majority		40		
Turnout				
Independent hold		Swing		

=== Trewern (one seat) ===
Trewern 2012
Party	Candidate	Votes	%	±%
Independent	Dawn Bailey*	290		
Conservative	Jessica Bradley	159		
Majority				
Turnout				
Independent hold		Swing		

=== Welshpool Castle (one seat) ===
Welshpool Castle 2012
Party	Candidate	Votes	%	±%
Independent	Philip Charles Pritchard*	192		
Independent	Estelle Blevais	98		
Conservative	Ian David Bradley	61		
Majority				
Turnout				
Independent hold		Swing		

=== Welshpool Gungrog (one seat) ===
Welshpool Gungrog 2012
Party	Candidate	Votes	%	±%
Liberal Democrats	Francesca Helen Jump*	445		
Conservative	Stephen Thomas Kaye	242		
Majority				
Turnout				
Liberal Democrats hold		Swing		

=== Welshpool Llanerchyddol (one seat) ===
Welshpool Llanerchyddol 2012
Party	Candidate	Votes	%	±%
Independent	Ann Florence Holloway*	358		
Liberal Democrats	John Morgan	355		
Majority		3		
Turnout				
Independent hold		Swing		

== Ward Results (Radnorshire) ==
=== Beguildy (one seat) ===
Beguildy 2012
Party	Candidate	Votes	%	±%
Independent	John Harold Brunt*	281		
Independent	Alan Cecil Watson	181		
Independent	Geoff Morgan	164		
Majority				
Turnout				
Independent hold		Swing		

=== Disserth and Trecoed (one seat) ===
Disserth and Trecoed 2012
Party	Candidate	Votes	%	±%
Conservative	Gwilym Ioan Snead Williams	346		
Liberal Democrats	Leslie Gwyn Davies*	230		
Majority				
Turnout				
Conservative gain from Liberal Democrats		Swing		

=== Glasbury (one seat) ===
Glasbury 2012
Party	Candidate	Votes	%	±%
Conservative	Christopher Paul Davies	502		
Independent	Margaret Elizabeth Morris*	299		
Independent	David Roger Hood	180		
Majority				N/A
Turnout				
Conservative gain from Independent		Swing		

=== Knighton (one seat) ===
Knighton 2012
Party	Candidate	Votes	%	±%
Independent	Peter James Medlicott	496		
Liberal Democrats	Kenneth Albert Harris*	274		
Independent	Penny Nicholson	134		
Independent	John Llewellyn Morgan	57		
Majority				
Turnout				
Independent gain from Liberal Democrats		Swing		

=== Llanbadarn Fawr (one seat) ===
Llanbadarn Fawr 2012
Party	Candidate	Votes	%	±%
Independent	John Powell	unopposed		
Independent hold		Swing		

=== Llandrindod East/West (one seat) ===
Llandrindod East/West 2012
Party	Candidate	Votes	%	±%
Independent	Keith Francis Tampin	172		
Liberal Democrats	Brian Arthur Lopez	151		
Christian	Nathan Edward Charles Casey	49		
Majority				
Turnout				
Independent hold		Swing		

=== Llandrindod North (one seat) ===
Gary Price previously represented a different ward as an Independent.

Llandrindod North 2012
Party	Candidate	Votes	%	±%
Independent	Gary David Price*	393		
Conservative	Mike Hodges*	215		
Labour	Mike Sivier	88		
Liberal Democrats	Marion Lopez	21		
Majority				
Turnout				
Independent gain from Conservative		Swing		

=== Llandrindod South (one seat) ===
The previous Conservative councilor stood as an Independent.

Llandrindod South 2012
Party	Candidate	Votes	%	±%
Conservative	Tom Turner	356		
Liberal Democrats	Shirley Ann Gitoes	255		
Independent	Sarah Jayne Millington*	181		
Majority		101		
Turnout				
Conservative hold		Swing		

=== Llanelwedd (one seat) ===
Llanelwedd 2012
Party	Candidate	Votes	%	±%
Liberal Democrats	Maureen Mackenzie*	unopposed		
Liberal Democrats hold		Swing		

=== Llangunllo (one seat) ===
Llangunllo 2012
Party	Candidate	Votes	%	±%
Independent	Hywel Lewis	unopposed		
Independent hold		Swing		

=== Llanyre (one seat) ===
Llanyre 2012
Party	Candidate	Votes	%	±%
Independent	John Evans*	286		
Independent	Geraint Owain Rees	213		
Christian	Jefrey David Green	44		
Liberal Democrats	Forbes Neil Lopez	8		
Majority				
Turnout				
Independent hold		Swing		

=== Nantmel (one seat) ===
Nantmel 2012
Party	Candidate	Votes	%	±%
Independent	David Owen Evans*	351		
Conservative	Catrin Edwards	277		
Liberal Democrats	Peter David Roberts	36		
Christian	Adam Bridgman	11		
Majority				
Turnout				
Independent hold		Swing		

=== Old Radnor (one seat) ===
Old Radnor 2012
Party	Candidate	Votes	%	±%
Independent	Evan Michael Jones*	305		
Liberal Democrats	John Stuart Milsom	264		
Independent	Bob Simcock	104		
Majority				
Turnout				
Independent hold		Swing		

=== Presteigne (one seat) ===
The sitting member had previously stood as a Liberal Democrat.

Presteigne 2012
Party	Candidate	Votes	%	±%
Independent	Garry Richard Banks*	492		
Independent	John Edward Wilding	462		
Liberal Democrats	Nat Green	244		
Majority				
Turnout				
Independent hold		Swing		

=== Rhayader (one seat) ===
Rhayader 2012
Party	Candidate	Votes	%	±%
Liberal Democrats	Kelvyn Watson Curry*	481		
Labour	Bryan the Blacksmith	203		
Conservative	Gemma Morris	91		
Majority				
Turnout				
Liberal Democrats hold		Swing		

== By-Elections 2012-2017 ==
=== Glasbury by-election 2015 ===
A by-election was held in Glasbury on 13 August 2015 following the resignation of Chris Davies, who was elected MP for Brecon and Radnor at the 2015 General Election.

Glasbury 2015 by-election
Party	Candidate	Votes	%	±%
Liberal Democrats	James Gibson-Watt	457	44.4	+44.4
Conservative	David Evans	415	40.3	−10.9
Independent	David Roger Hood	106	10.3	−8.0
Green	Louise Davies	52	5.0	+5.0
Majority		42	4.1	
Turnout			56.5	+1.1
Liberal Democrats gain from Conservative		Swing		

=== Welshpool Llanerchyddol by-election 2016 ===
A by-election was held in Welshpool Llanerchyddol on 15 December 2016 following the death of Ann Holloway.

Welshpool Llanerchyddol 2016 by-election
Party	Candidate	Votes	%	±%
Independent	Graham Breeze	323	48.9	+48.9
Liberal Democrats	Richard Church	212	32.1	−17.7
Conservative	Ruth Canning	126	19.1	+19.1
Majority		111	16.8	
Turnout			36.0	
Independent hold		Swing		

== See also ==
- List of electoral wards in Powys
