= 2004 Powys County Council election =

2004 Welsh local government election

Map of the results of the 2004 Powys County Council election.

The third election to Powys County Council following local government reorganisation was held in June 2004. It was preceded by the 1999 election and followed by the 2008 election. The election resulted once again in a majority of Independent councillors

== Results Overview ==
Powys County Council election result 2004
Party	Seats	Gains	Losses	Net gain/loss	Seats %	Votes %	Votes	+/−
Labour	4							
Conservative	0							
Liberal Democrats	15							
Plaid Cymru	0							
Independent	54							
Green								

== Ward Results (Brecknockshire) ==
=== Aber-craf (one seat) ===
Aber-craf 2004
Party	Candidate	Votes	%	±%
Labour	Cyril Gwyn Gwillim*	508		
Independent	Stanley James Bowen	100		
Liberal Democrats	William Aubrey Jenkins	93		
Majority				
Turnout			65.0	+65.0
Labour hold		Swing		

=== Bronllys (one seat) ===
Bronllys 2004
Party	Candidate	Votes	%	±%
Independent	Stephen Davies*	unopposed		
Independent hold		Swing		

=== Builth (one seat) ===
Builth 2004
Party	Candidate	Votes	%	±%
Independent	Lily Jarman-Harris	520		
Independent	Edward Ernest William Sweet*	490		
Majority				
Turnout			55.0	+3.0
Independent hold		Swing		

=== Bwlch (one seat) ===
Bwlch 2004
Party	Candidate	Votes	%	±%
Liberal Democrats	Susan Kathryn Silk	unopposed		
Liberal Democrats hold		Swing		

=== Crickhowell (one seat) ===
The Liberal Democrats won the seat in a by-election.

Crickhowell 2004
Party	Candidate	Votes	%	±%
Liberal Democrats	John Gerwyn Morris*	unopposed		
Liberal Democrats hold		Swing		

=== Cwmtwrch (one seat) ===
Cwmtwrch 2004
Party	Candidate	Votes	%	±%
Labour	Sandra Christine Davies	unopposed		
Labour hold		Swing		

=== Felin-fach (one seat) ===
Felin-fach 2004
Party	Candidate	Votes	%	±%
Independent	Hilda Jean Whittal*	unopposed		
Independent hold		Swing		

=== Gwernyfed (one seat) ===
Gwernyfed 2004
Party	Candidate	Votes	%	±%
Independent	Geraint George Hopkins*	unopposed		
Independent hold		Swing		

=== Hay (one seat) ===
Hay 2004
Party	Candidate	Votes	%	±%
Liberal Democrats	Charles James Gibson-Watt*	452		
Independent	Richard George William Pitt Booth	121		
Majority				
Turnout			44.0	−2.0
Liberal Democrats hold		Swing		

=== Llanafanfawr (one seat) ===
Llanafanfawr, 2004
Party	Candidate	Votes	%	±%
Independent	David Rowland Price*	unopposed		
Independent hold		Swing		

=== Llangattock (one seat) ===
Llangattock 2004
Party	Candidate	Votes	%	±%
Independent	Brian Austen Wintle	215		
Liberal Democrats	Patricia McBride	123		
Labour	Jacqueline Lisa Charlton	67		
Majority				
Turnout			48.5	+48.5
Independent hold		Swing		

=== Llangors (one seat) ===
Llangors 2004
Party	Candidate	Votes	%	±%
Liberal Democrats	Melanie Jade Brookes Tunnicliffe*	unopposed		
Liberal Democrats hold		Swing		

=== Llangynidr (one seat) ===
Llangynidr 2004
Party	Candidate	Votes	%	±%
Independent	Muriel Rosemarie Harris*	unopposed		
Independent hold		Swing		

=== Llanwrtyd Wells (one seat) ===
Llanwrtyd Wells 2004
Party	Candidate	Votes	%	±%
Independent	Timothy John Van Rees*	541		
Liberal Democrats	Clive William Frederick Brooks	213		
Plaid Cymru	Thomas Gareth Morris	57		
Majority				
Turnout			58.0	+58.0
Independent hold		Swing		

=== Maescar / Llywel (one seat) ===
Maescar / Llywel 2004
Party	Candidate	Votes	%	±%
Independent	Evan Thomas Morgan*	498		
Independent	Edwin Llewelyn Roderick	366		
Majority				
Turnout			62.0	+62.0
Independent hold		Swing		

=== St Davids Within (one seat) ===
St Davids Within 2004
Party	Candidate	Votes	%	±%
Independent	Marilyn Roberts*	unopposed		
Independent hold		Swing		

=== St John (one seat) ===
St John 2004
Party	Candidate	Votes	%	±%
Liberal Democrats	William Bryan Bufton	616		
Independent	Andrew Martin Charles Weale	429		
Majority				
Turnout			42.0	−0.9
Liberal Democrats gain from Labour		Swing		

=== St Mary (one seat) ===
St Mary 2004
Party	Candidate	Votes	%	±%
Liberal Democrats	Paul James Ashton	unopposed		
Liberal Democrats gain from Independent		Swing		

=== Talgarth (one seat) ===
Talgarth 1999
Party	Candidate	Votes	%	±%
Liberal Democrats	William Denston Powell	248		
Independent	Ivy Brenda Lewis*	242		
Conservative	Peter Graham Weavers	209		
Plaid Cymru	Brynach Parri	26		
Majority		6		N/A
Turnout			56.0	+14.0
Liberal Democrats gain from Independent		Swing		

=== Talybont-on-Usk (one seat) ===
Talybont-on-Usk 2004
Party	Candidate	Votes	%	±%
Independent	Dorothy Margaret Jane James*	unopposed		
Independent hold		Swing		

=== Tawe Uchaf (one seat) ===
Tawe Uchaf 2004
Party	Candidate	Votes	%	±%
Independent	Krishn Pathak	218		
Independent	Janine Amanda David	144		
Independent	Susan Ann Brace	140		
Independent	Penelope Esther Jones	136		
Independent	Colin Howard Woodley	107		
Liberal Democrats	Philip Charles Hoptroff	105		
Majority				
Turnout			49.0	+49.0
Independent gain from Labour		Swing		

=== Ynyscedwyn (one seat) ===
Ynyscedwyn 2004
Party	Candidate	Votes	%	±%
Labour	Vivian James Gibbs*	unopposed		
Labour hold		Swing		

=== Yscir (one seat) ===
Yscir 2004
Party	Candidate	Votes	%	±%
Independent	Dorothy Gillian Thomas*	unopposed		
Independent hold		Swing		

=== Ystradgynlais (one seat) ===
Ystradgynlais 2004
Party	Candidate	Votes	%	±%
Labour	John Steadman	unopposed		
Labour hold		Swing		

== Ward Results (Montgomeryshire) ==
=== Banwy (one seat) ===
Banwy 2004
Party	Candidate	Votes	%	±%
Independent	Eluned Beryl Maud Vaughan*	unopposed		
Independent hold		Swing		

=== Berriew (one seat) ===
Berriew 1999
Party	Candidate	Votes	%	±%
Independent	John Allan Lawton	342		
Independent	David Edward Davies	231		
Majority				
Turnout			56.0	+56.0
Independent hold		Swing		

=== Blaen Hafren (one seat) ===
Blaen Hafren 2004
Party	Candidate	Votes	%	±%
Independent	Gwilym Thomas Evans*	unopposed		
Independent hold		Swing		

=== Caaersws (one seat) ===
Caresws 2004
Party	Candidate	Votes	%	±%
Independent	Elizabeth Rachel Davies*	unopposed		
Independent hold		Swing		

=== Churchstoke (one seat) ===
Churchstoke 2004
Party	Candidate	Votes	%	±%
Independent	Gwynfryn Courtnenay Hamer*	unopposed		
Independent hold		Swing		

=== Dolforwyn (one seat) ===
Wynne Jones had won the seat, previously held by a Conservative, at a by-election in January 2004.

Dolforwyn 2004
Party	Candidate	Votes	%	±%
Independent	Wynne Thomas Jones*	unopposed		
Independent hold		Swing		

=== Forden (one seat) ===
Forden 2004
Party	Candidate	Votes	%	±%
Liberal Democrats	Karen Janet Riffel	unopposed		
Liberal Democrats gain from Independent		Swing		

=== Glantwymyn (one seat) ===
Glantwymyn 2004
Party	Candidate	Votes	%	±%
Independent	Gwilym Pughe Vaughan*	unopposed		
Independent hold		Swing		

=== Guilsfield (one seat) ===
Guilsfield 2004
Party	Candidate	Votes	%	±%
Independent	David Richard Jones*	unopposed		
Independent hold		Swing		

=== Kerry (one seat) ===
Kerry 2004
Party	Candidate	Votes	%	±%
Independent	Kathryn Mary Roberts-Jones*	unopposed		
Independent hold		Swing		

=== Llanbrynmair (one seat) ===
Llanbrynmair 2004
Party	Candidate	Votes	%	±%
Independent	Robert William Morgan	unopposed		
Independent hold		Swing		

=== Llandinam (one seat) ===
Llandinam 2004
Party	Candidate	Votes	%	±%
Independent	Leonard Roche Elvet Davies	unopposed		
Independent hold		Swing		

=== Llandrinio (one seat) ===
Llandrinio 2004
Party	Candidate	Votes	%	±%
Independent	Richard Graham Brown*	unopposed		
Independent hold		Swing		

=== Llandysilio (one seat) ===
Llandysilio 2004
Party	Candidate	Votes	%	±%
Independent	Evan Arwel Jones	unopposed		
Independent hold		Swing		

=== Llanfair Caereinion (one seat) ===
Llanfair Caereinion 2004
Party	Candidate	Votes	%	±%
Independent	Viola Elizabeth Evans*	unopposed		
Independent hold		Swing		

=== Llanfihangel (one seat) ===
Llanfihangel 2004
Party	Candidate	Votes	%	±%
Independent	William Barry Thomas*	unopposed		
Independent hold		Swing		

=== Llanfyllin (one seat) ===
Llanfyllin 2004
Party	Candidate	Votes	%	±%
Independent	John Ellis Bowen*	339		
Independent	David Barry Goodman	188		
Majority				
Turnout			49.0	−10.0
Independent hold		Swing		

=== Llanidloes (one seat) ===
Llanidloes 1999
Party	Candidate	Votes	%	±%
Liberal Democrats	Gareth Morgan*	unopposed		
Liberal Democrats win (new seat)				

=== Llanrhaeadr-ym-Mochnant / Llansilin (one seat) ===
Llanrhaeadr-ym-Mochnant / Llansilin 2004
Party	Candidate	Votes	%	±%
Independent	John Henry Hughes*	496		
Independent	Ethel Maureen Wilde	339		
Majority				
Turnout			62.0	+3.0
Independent hold		Swing		

=== Llansantffraid (one seat) ===
Llansantffraid 2004
Party	Candidate	Votes	%	±%
Independent	Tegwyn Jones*	unopposed		
Independent hold		Swing		

=== Llanwddyn (one seat) ===
Llanwddyn 2004
Party	Candidate	Votes	%	±%
Independent	Gwilym Thomas Tibbott*	unopposed		
Independent hold		Swing		

=== Machynlleth (one seat) ===
Machynlleth 2004
Party	Candidate	Votes	%	±%
Independent	John Michael Williams*	unopposed		
Independent hold		Swing		

=== Meifod (one seat) ===
Meifod 2004
Party	Candidate	Votes	%	±%
Independent	Eldrydd Mary Jones	unopposed		
Independent hold		Swing		

=== Montgomery (one seat) ===
Montgomery 2004
Party	Candidate	Votes	%	±%
Independent	Brian Penton Richards*	219		
Liberal Democrats	Eric Brian Fairbrother	192		
Independent	Margaret Olwen John	150		
Majority				
Turnout			56.0	+56.0
Independent hold		Swing		

=== Newtown Central (one seat) ===
Newtown Central 2004
Party	Candidate	Votes	%	±%
Independent	Joseph Walter Griffiths*	259		
Independent	Reginald Taylor	199		
Conservative	Joy Rachel Jones	195		
Majority				
Turnout			29.0	−14.0
Independent hold		Swing		

=== Newtown East (one seat) ===
Newtown East 2004
Party	Candidate	Votes	%	±%
Liberal Democrats	Louis Hedley Williams*	unopposed		
Liberal Democrats hold		Swing		

=== Newtown Llanllwchaiaran North (one seat) ===
Newtown Llanllwchaiaran North 2004
Party	Candidate	Votes	%	±%
Liberal Democrats	Richard Noyce*	257		
Conservative	Francis Alexander Torrens	255		
Majority				
Turnout			38.0	−10.0
Liberal Democrats hold		Swing		

=== Newtown Llanllwchaiaran West ===
Newtown Llanllwchaiaran West 2004
Party	Candidate	Votes	%	±%
Independent	Robert Thomas Davey	unopposed		
Independent hold		Swing		

=== Newtown South (one seat) ===
Newtown South 2004
Party	Candidate	Votes	%	±%
Independent	Robert Henry Mills	380		
Liberal Democrats	Richard John White	93		
Majority				
Turnout			38.0	
Independent hold		Swing		

=== Rhiwcynon (one seat) ===
Rhiwcynon 2004
Party	Candidate	Votes	%	±%
Independent	Joyce Gethin Shearer*	unopposed		
Independent hold		Swing		

=== Trewern (one seat) ===
Trewern 2004
Party	Candidate	Votes	%	±%
Independent	Dawn Bailey	unopposed		
Independent hold		Swing		

=== Welshpool Castle (one seat) ===
Welshpool Castle 2004
Party	Candidate	Votes	%	±%
Independent	Philip Charles Pritchard	183		
Liberal Democrats	Francesca Jump	144		
Independent	John Robert Peatroy	63		
Majority				
Turnout			46.0	+8.0
Independent hold		Swing		

=== Welshpool Gungrog (one seat) ===
The Liberal Democrats took the seat from Labour at a by-election.

Welshpool Gungrog 2004
Party	Candidate	Votes	%	±%
Liberal Democrats	David Mervyn Gwynfor Kinsey	450		
Conservative	Nicholas John Bardsley	182		
Majority				
Turnout			37.0	+37.0
Liberal Democrats hold		Swing		

=== Welshpool Llanerchyddol (one seat) ===
Welshpool Llanerchyddol 1999
Party	Candidate	Votes	%	±%
Independent	Ann Florence Holloway*	546		
Liberal Democrats	Wendy Benge-Abbott	248		
Majority				
Turnout			34.0	+34.0
Independent hold		Swing		

== Ward Results (Radnorshire) ==
=== Beguildy (one seat) ===
Beguildy 2004
Party	Candidate	Votes	%	±%
Independent	John Harold Brunt	unopposed		
Independent hold		Swing		

=== Disserth and Trecoed (one seat) ===
Disserth and Trecoed 2004
Party	Candidate	Votes	%	±%
Liberal Democrats	Leslie Gwyn Davies*	unopposed		
Liberal Democrats hold		Swing		

=== Glasbury (one seat) ===
Glasbury 2004
Party	Candidate	Votes	%	±%
Independent	Margaret Elizabeth Morris*	unopposed		
Independent hold		Swing		

=== Knighton (one seat) ===
Knighton 2004
Party	Candidate	Votes	%	±%
Liberal Democrats	Kenneth Albert Harris	725		
Independent	Janice Geraldine Harris	360		
Majority				
Turnout				
Liberal Democrats hold		Swing		

=== Llanbadarn Fawr (one seat) ===
Llanbadarn Fawr 2004
Party	Candidate	Votes	%	±%
Independent	Fred Barker*	unopposed		
Independent hold		Swing		

=== Llandrindod East/West (one seat) ===
Llandrindod East/West 2004
Party	Candidate	Votes	%	±%
Independent	Gary David Price	266		
Independent	Kenneth John Richards	207		
Majority				
Turnout			48.0	
Independent hold		Swing		

=== Llandrindod North (one seat) ===
Llandrindod North 2004
Party	Candidate	Votes	%	±%
Independent	Keith Francis Tampin	365		
Independent	Robert William Bevan*	324		
Majority		31		
Turnout			49.0	
Independent hold		Swing		

=== Llandrindod South (one seat) ===
Llandrindod South 2004
Party	Candidate	Votes	%	±%
Independent	Edward Brian Oakley*	434		
Liberal Democrats	David John Peter	415		
Majority		19		
Turnout			50.0	
Independent hold		Swing		

=== Llanelwedd (one seat) ===
Llanelwedd 2004
Party	Candidate	Votes	%	±%
Independent	Valerie Ann Morgan	340		
Independent	Geoffrey Miles Worts*	213		
Majority				
Turnout			58.0	
Independent hold		Swing		

=== Llangunllo (one seat) ===
Llangunllo 2004
Party	Candidate	Votes	%	±%
Independent	Wilfred Geoffrey Lewis	377		
Independent	William John Thomas Powell	199		
Liberal Democrats	Martin Anthony Holborrow	64		
Majority				
Turnout			63.0	+63.0
Independent hold		Swing		

=== Llanyre (one seat) ===
Llanyre 2004
Party	Candidate	Votes	%	±%
Independent	John David Arthur Thompson*	361		
Independent	Julia Elizabeth Owens	155		
Majority				
Turnout			57.0	
Independent hold		Swing		

=== Nantmel (one seat) ===
Nantmel 2004
Party	Candidate	Votes	%	±%
Independent	David Owen Evans*	unopposed		
Independent hold		Swing		

=== Old Radnor (one seat) ===
Old Radnor 2004
Party	Candidate	Votes	%	±%
Independent	Evan Michael Jones*	606		
Liberal Democrats	Margaret Joan Leach	150		
Majority				
Turnout			60.0	+60.0
Independent hold		Swing		

=== Presteigne (one seat) ===
Presteigne 2004
Party	Candidate	Votes	%	±%
Liberal Democrats	Garry Richard Banks*	unopposed		
Liberal Democrats hold		Swing		

=== Rhayader (one seat) ===
Rhayader 2004
Party	Candidate	Votes	%	±%
Liberal Democrats	Richard Hugh Tyler*	369		
Independent	Elizabeth Fletcher Phillips	321		
Independent	Edward Narborough	261		
Majority				
Turnout				
Liberal Democrats hold		Swing		

== By-Elections 2004-08 ==
A number of by-elections were held during this period.
