= 2008 Powys County Council election =

2008 Welsh local government election

Map of the results of the 2008 Powys County Council election.

The fourth election to Powys County Council following local government reorganisation was held in May 2008. It was preceded by the 2004 election and followed by the 2012 election. The election resulted once again in a majority of Independent councillors

== Results Overview ==
There was an Independent Majority.

Powys County Council election result 2008
Party	Seats	Gains	Losses	Net gain/loss	Seats %	Votes %	Votes	+/−
Independent	45	0	9	-9				
Liberal Democrats	15	0	0	0				
Conservative	9	9	0	+9				
Labour	4	0	0	0				
Plaid Cymru	0	0	0	0	0.0			
Green	0	0	0	0	0.0			

== Ward Results (Brecknockshire) ==
=== Aber-craf (one seat) ===
Aber-craf 2008
Party	Candidate	Votes	%	±%
Labour	Cyril Gwyn Gwillim*	unopposed		
Labour hold		Swing		

=== Bronllys (one seat) ===
Bronllys 2008
Party	Candidate	Votes	%	±%
Liberal Democrats	Claire Elizabeth Powell	259		
Independent	Stephen Davies*	203		
Conservative	Alastair John Scott	116		
Majority				
Turnout			59.0	+59.0
Liberal Democrats gain from Independent		Swing		

=== Builth (one seat) ===
Builth 2008
Party	Candidate	Votes	%	±%
Independent	Avril York	607		
Independent	Lily Jarman-Harris*	324		
Majority				
Turnout			49.0	+49.0
Independent hold		Swing		

=== Bwlch (one seat) ===
Bwlch 2008
Party	Candidate	Votes	%	±%
Liberal Democrats	Susan Kathryn Silk*	286		
Conservative	Alastair John Scott	185		
Majority				
Turnout			64.0	+64.0
Liberal Democrats hold		Swing		

=== Crickhowell (one seat) ===
Crickhowell 2008
Party	Candidate	Votes	%	±%
Liberal Democrats	John Gerwyn Morris*	646		
Conservative	David Thomas	491		
Majority				
Turnout			49.0	+49.0
Liberal Democrats hold		Swing		

=== Cwmtwrch (one seat) ===
Cwmtwrch 2008
Party	Candidate	Votes	%	±%
Labour	Sandra Christine Davies*	unopposed		
Labour hold		Swing		

=== Felin-fach (one seat) ===
Felin-fach 2008
Party	Candidate	Votes	%	±%
Independent	Tony Thomas	234		
Independent	John Frederick Pratt	173		
Independent	John Rowland Price	126		
Majority				
Turnout			50.0	+50.0
Independent hold		Swing		

=== Gwernyfed (one seat) ===
Gwernyfed 2008
Party	Candidate	Votes	%	±%
Independent	Geraint George Hopkins*	unopposed		
Independent hold		Swing		

=== Hay (one seat) ===
Hay 2008
Party	Candidate	Votes	%	±%
Conservative	Gareth William Ratcliffe	395		
Liberal Democrats	Charles James Gibson-Watt*	325		
Majority		70		
Turnout			56.0	+12.0
Conservative gain from Liberal Democrats		Swing		

=== Llanafanfawr (one seat) ===
Llanafanfawr, 2008
Party	Candidate	Votes	%	±%
Independent	David Rowland Price*	unopposed		
Independent hold		Swing		

=== Llangattock (one seat) ===
Llangattock 2008
Party	Candidate	Votes	%	±%
Liberal Democrats	Jeff Holmes	184		
Conservative	Andrew Lennox Stuart	182		
Majority		2		
Turnout			44.0	−4.5
Liberal Democrats gain from Independent		Swing		

=== Llangors (one seat) ===
Llangors 2008
Party	Candidate	Votes	%	±%
Liberal Democrats	Melanie Jade Brookes Tunnicliffe*	unopposed		
Liberal Democrats hold		Swing		

=== Llangynidr (one seat) ===
Llangynidr 2008
Party	Candidate	Votes	%	±%
Independent	Muriel Rosemarie Harris*	unopposed		
Independent hold		Swing		

=== Llanwrtyd Wells (one seat) ===
Llanwrtyd Wells 2008
Party	Candidate	Votes	%	±%
Independent	Timothy John Van Rees*	573		
Plaid Cymru	Thomas Gareth Morris	110		
Independent	Robert Douglas Nicholson	67		
Majority				
Turnout			51.0	−7.0
Independent hold		Swing		

=== Maescar / Llywel (one seat) ===
Maescar / Llywel 2008
Party	Candidate	Votes	%	±%
Independent	Evan Thomas Morgan*	unopposed		
Independent hold		Swing		

=== St Davids Within (one seat) ===
St Davids Within 2008
Party	Candidate	Votes	%	±%
Independent	Andrew Martin Charles Weale*	372		
Conservative	Andrew Powell	137		
Majority				
Turnout			41.0	+41.0
Independent hold		Swing		

=== St John (one seat) ===
St John 2008
Party	Candidate	Votes	%	±%
Independent	David William Meredith	528		
Labour	Matthew James Dorrance	430		
Liberal Democrats	William Bryan Bufton*	252		
Conservative	Barbara Patricia Burgess	250		
Majority				
Turnout			54.0	+12.0
Independent gain from Liberal Democrats		Swing		

=== St Mary (one seat) ===
St Mary 2008
Party	Candidate	Votes	%	±%
Liberal Democrats	Paul James Ashton*	350		
Independent	Sharon Elaine Williams	304		
Conservative	Gareth Jones	303		
Majority				
Turnout			51.0	+51.0
Liberal Democrats hold		Swing		

=== Talgarth (one seat) ===
Talgarth 2008
Party	Candidate	Votes	%	±%
Liberal Democrats	William Denston Powell	Unopposed	N/A	N/A
Liberal Democrats hold				

=== Talybont-on-Usk (one seat) ===
Talybont-on-Usk 2008
Party	Candidate	Votes	%	±%
Liberal Democrats	Liam Fitzpatrick	513		
Independent	Geraint James	322		
Majority				
Turnout			53.0	+53.0
Liberal Democrats gain from Independent		Swing		

=== Tawe Uchaf (one seat) ===
Tawe Uchaf 2008
Party	Candidate	Votes	%	±%
Independent	Krishn Pathak*	483		
Labour	David Arnold Thomas	397		
Majority				
Turnout			51.0	+2.0
Independent hold		Swing		

=== Ynyscedwyn (one seat) ===
Ynyscedwyn 2008
Party	Candidate	Votes	%	±%
Labour	Susan McNicholas*	unopposed		
Labour hold		Swing		

=== Yscir (one seat) ===
Yscir 2008
Party	Candidate	Votes	%	±%
Independent	Dorothy Gillian Thomas*	358		
Independent	Richard Brown	82		
Majority				
Turnout			53.0	+53.0
Independent hold		Swing		

=== Ystradgynlais (two seats) ===
Ystradgynlais 2008
Party	Candidate	Votes	%	±%
Labour	John Steadman*			
Independent	Joyce Thomas	397		
Majority				
Turnout			43.0	+43.0
Labour hold		Swing		

== Ward Results (Montgomeryshire) ==
=== Banwy (one seat) ===
Banwy 2008
Party	Candidate	Votes	%	±%
Independent	Eluned Beryl Maud Vaughan*	unopposed		
Independent hold		Swing		

=== Berriew (one seat) ===
Berriew 2008
Party	Candidate	Votes	%	±%
Independent	David Edward Davies	298		
Independent	John Allan Lawton*	179		
Liberal Democrats	Penny Vingoe	70		
Independent	David Terry Evans	57		
Majority				
Turnout			57.0	+1.0
Independent hold		Swing		

=== Blaen Hafren (one seat) ===
Blaen Hafren 2008
Party	Candidate	Votes	%	±%
Independent	Gwilym Thomas Evans*	630		
Independent	John Cradduck	437		
Majority				
Turnout			59.0	+59.0
Independent hold		Swing		

=== Caersws (one seat) ===
Caresws 2008
Party	Candidate	Votes	%	±%
Independent	Elizabeth Rachel Davies*	668		
Independent	Wyn Davies	270		
Majority				
Turnout			50.0	+50.0
Independent hold		Swing		

=== Churchstoke (one seat) ===
Churchstoke 2008
Party	Candidate	Votes	%	±%
Independent	Michael John Jones*	unopposed		
Independent hold		Swing		

=== Dolforwyn (one seat) ===
Dolforwyn 2008
Party	Candidate	Votes	%	±%
Independent	Wynne Thomas Jones*	unopposed		
Independent hold		Swing		

=== Forden (one seat) ===
Forden 2008
Party	Candidate	Votes	%	±%
Independent	Linda Veronica Corfield	unopposed		
Independent gain from Liberal Democrats		Swing		

=== Glantwymyn (one seat) ===
Glantwymyn 2008
Party	Candidate	Votes	%	±%
Independent	Gwilym Pughe Vaughan*	unopposed		
Independent hold		Swing		

=== Guilsfield (one seat) ===
Guilsfield 2008
Party	Candidate	Votes	%	±%
Independent	David Richard Jones*	unopposed		
Independent hold		Swing		

=== Kerry (one seat) ===
Kerry 2008
Party	Candidate	Votes	%	±%
Independent	Kathryn Mary Roberts-Jones*	unopposed		
Independent hold		Swing		

=== Llanbrynmair (one seat) ===
Llanbrynmair 2008
Party	Candidate	Votes	%	±%
Independent	Robert William Morgan*	unopposed		
Independent hold		Swing		

=== Llandinam (one seat) ===
Llandinam 2008
Party	Candidate	Votes	%	±%
Independent	Leonard Roche Elvet Davies*	unopposed		
Independent hold		Swing		

=== Llandrinio (one seat) ===
Llandrinio 2008
Party	Candidate	Votes	%	±%
Independent	Richard Graham Brown*	unopposed		
Independent hold		Swing		

=== Llandysilio (one seat) ===
Llandysilio 2008
Party	Candidate	Votes	%	±%
Independent	Evan Arwel Jones*	310		
Independent	Nick Savage	156		
Conservative	Mark Frederik Johannsen	125		
Majority				
Turnout			42.0	+42.0
Independent hold		Swing		

=== Llanfair Caereinion (one seat) ===
Llanfair Caereinion 2008
Party	Candidate	Votes	%	±%
Independent	Viola Elizabeth Evans*	unopposed		
Independent hold		Swing		

=== Llanfihangel (one seat) ===
Llanfihangel 2008
Party	Candidate	Votes	%	±%
Independent	William Barry Thomas*	unopposed		
Independent hold		Swing		

=== Llanfyllin (one seat) ===
Llanfyllin 2008
Party	Candidate	Votes	%	±%
Conservative	Peter Edward Lewis	281		
Independent	John Ellis Bowen*	186		
Independent	David Barry Goodman	89		
Majority				
Turnout			48.0	−1.0
Conservative gain from Independent		Swing		

=== Llanidloes (one seat) ===
Llanidloes 2008
Party	Candidate	Votes	%	±%
Liberal Democrats	Gareth Morgan*	632		
Independent	Nickolas Venti	465		
Independent	Robert Vaughan Parker-Munn	146		
Majority				
Turnout			55.0	+55.0
Liberal Democrats hold		Swing		

=== Llanrhaeadr-ym-Mochnant / Llansilin (one seat) ===
Llanrhaeadr-ym-Mochnant / Llansilin 2008
Party	Candidate	Votes	%	±%
Conservative	Aled Wyn Davies	582		
Independent	Ethel Maureen Wilde	267		
Liberal Democrats	Simon Robert Spencer	126		
Majority				
Turnout			55	−7.0
Conservative gain from Independent		Swing		

=== Llansantffraid (one seat) ===
Llansantffraid 2008
Party	Candidate	Votes	%	±%
Independent	Tegwyn Jones*	unopposed		
Independent hold		Swing		

=== Llanwddyn (one seat) ===
Llanwddyn 2008
Party	Candidate	Votes	%	±%
Conservative	Simon Robert Maurice Baynes	unopposed		
Conservative gain from Independent		Swing		

=== Machynlleth (one seat) ===
Machynlleth 2008
Party	Candidate	Votes	%	±%
Independent	John Michael Williams*	unopposed		
Independent hold		Swing		

=== Meifod (one seat) ===
Meifod 2008
Party	Candidate	Votes	%	±%
Independent	Eldrydd Mary Jones*	unopposed		
Independent hold		Swing		

=== Montgomery (one seat) ===
Montgomery 2008
Party	Candidate	Votes	%	±%
Independent	Stephen Murray Hayes*	358		
Conservative	Richard Horne	138		
Majority				
Turnout			47.0	−9.0
Independent hold		Swing		

=== Newtown Central (one seat) ===
Newtown Central 2008
Party	Candidate	Votes	%	±%
Conservative	Russell Ian George	314		
Liberal Democrats	Dougie Bancroft	211		
Independent	Reginald Taylor	110		
Independent	Robert Alan Lloyd	29		
Independent	John Andrew McCall	26		
Majority				
Turnout			30.0	+1.0
Conservative gain from Independent		Swing		

=== Newtown East (one seat) ===
Newtown East 2008
Party	Candidate	Votes	%	±%
Liberal Democrats	Richard John White	210		
Independent	Nur Uddin	145		
Majority				
Turnout			23.0	+23.0
Liberal Democrats hold		Swing		

=== Newtown Llanllwchaiaran North (one seat) ===
Newtown Llanllwchaiaran North 2008
Party	Candidate	Votes	%	±%
Conservative	Francis Alexander Torrens	378		
Liberal Democrats	Richard Noyce*	288		
Majority				
Turnout			38.0	0.0
Conservative gain from Liberal Democrats		Swing		

=== Newtown Llanllwchaiaran West ===
Newtown Llanllwchaiaran West 2008
Party	Candidate	Votes	%	±%
Conservative	Peter Harris	367		
Independent	Robert Thomas Davey*	166		
Liberal Democrats	Stephen John Page	121		
Majority				
Turnout			38.0	0.0
Conservative gain from Independent		Swing		

=== Newtown South (one seat) ===
Newtown South 2008
Party	Candidate	Votes	%	±%
Independent	Robert Henry Mills*	332		
Liberal Democrats	Sue Callery	103		
Independent	Philip Bowell Watkins	37		
Majority				
Turnout			37.0	−1.0
Independent hold		Swing		

=== Rhiwcynon (one seat) ===
Rhiwcynon 2008
Party	Candidate	Votes	%	±%
Independent	Joyce Gethin Shearer*	unopposed		
Independent hold		Swing		

=== Trewern (one seat) ===
Trewern 2008
Party	Candidate	Votes	%	±%
Independent	Dawn Bailey*	308		
Independent	John William Evams	154		
Majority				
Turnout			43.0	+43.0
Independent hold		Swing		

=== Welshpool Castle (one seat) ===
Welshpool Castle 2008
Party	Candidate	Votes	%	±%
Independent	Philip Charles Pritchard	277		
Conservative	Stephen Thomas Kaye	151		
Majority				
Turnout			28.0	−18.0
Independent hold		Swing		

=== Welshpool Gungrog (one seat) ===
Welshpool Gungrog 2008
Party	Candidate	Votes	%	±%
Liberal Democrats	Francesca Helen Jump*	443		
Independent	David John Delwyn Williams	350		
Majority				
Turnout			42.0	+3.0
Liberal Democrats hold		Swing		

=== Welshpool Llanerchyddol (one seat) ===
Welshpool Llanerchyddol 2008
Party	Candidate	Votes	%	±%
Independent	Ann Florence Holloway*	426		
Liberal Democrats	Mark Howells	353		
Majority				
Turnout			46.0	+12.0
Independent hold		Swing		

== Ward Results (Radnorshire) ==
=== Beguildy (one seat) ===
Beguildy 2008
Party	Candidate	Votes	%	±%
Independent	John Harold Brunt*	273		
Independent	Christopher Robert Thomas	246		
Independent	Geoff Morgan	163		
Independent	Jan Harris	51		
Majority				
Turnout				
Independent hold		Swing		

=== Disserth and Trecoed (one seat) ===
Disserth and Trecoed 2008
Party	Candidate	Votes	%	±%
Liberal Democrats	Leslie Gwyn Davies*	286		
Conservative	Gwilym Williams	238		
Independent	Geraint Evans	86		
Majority				
Turnout				
Liberal Democrats hold		Swing		

=== Glasbury (one seat) ===
Glasbury 2008
Party	Candidate	Votes	%	±%
Independent	Margaret Elizabeth Morris*	unopposed		
Independent hold		Swing		

=== Knighton (one seat) ===
Knighton 2008
Party	Candidate	Votes	%	±%
Liberal Democrats	Kenneth Albert Harris*	445		
Independent	Christine Brandford	359		
Independent	Peter Reynolds	341		
Majority				
Turnout				
Liberal Democrats hold		Swing		

=== Llanbadarn Fawr (one seat) ===
Llanbadarn Fawr 2008
Party	Candidate	Votes	%	±%
Independent	Fred Barker*	302		
Independent	John Powell	230		
Majority				
Turnout				
Independent hold		Swing		

=== Llandrindod East/West (one seat) ===
Llandrindod East/West 2008
Party	Candidate	Votes	%	±%
Independent	Gary David Price*	unopposed		
Independent hold		Swing		

=== Llandrindod North (one seat) ===
Llandrindod North 2008
Party	Candidate	Votes	%	±%
Conservative	Mike Hodges	391		
Independent	Keith Francis Tampin*	302		
Majority		31		
Turnout			49.0	
Conservative gain from Independent		Swing		

=== Llandrindod South (one seat) ===
Llandrindod South 2008
Party	Candidate	Votes	%	±%
Conservative	Sarah Jayne Millington	405		
Liberal Democrats	David John Peter*	397		
Majority		18		
Turnout			50.0	
Conservative gain from Independent		Swing		

=== Llanelwedd (one seat) ===
Llanelwedd 2008
Party	Candidate	Votes	%	±%
Liberal Democrats	Maureen Mackenzie	283		
Conservative	Peter John Holtorp	177		
Independent	Robert Southcott	95		
Majority				
Turnout			58.0	
Liberal Democrats gain from Independent		Swing		

=== Llangunllo (one seat) ===
Llangunllo 2008
Party	Candidate	Votes	%	±%
Independent	Wilfred Geoffrey Lewis*	unopposed		
Independent hold		Swing		

=== Llanyre (one seat) ===
Llanyre 2008
Party	Candidate	Votes	%	±%
Independent	John Evans	unopposed		
Independent hold		Swing		

=== Nantmel (one seat) ===
Nantmel 2008
Party	Candidate	Votes	%	±%
Independent	David Owen Evans*	357		
Conservative	Catrin Edwards	326		
Majority				
Turnout				
Independent hold		Swing		

=== Old Radnor (one seat) ===
Old Radnor 2008
Party	Candidate	Votes	%	±%
Independent	Evan Michael Jones*	415		
Liberal Democrats	David Barwick	244		
Majority				
Turnout				
Independent hold		Swing		

=== Presteigne (one seat) ===
Presteigne 2008
Party	Candidate	Votes	%	±%
Liberal Democrats	Garry Richard Banks*	unopposed		
Liberal Democrats hold		Swing		

=== Rhayader (one seat) ===
Rhayader 2008
Party	Candidate	Votes	%	±%
Liberal Democrats	Kelvyn Watson Curry	260		
Independent	Edward Narborough	226		
UKIP	John Andreas Bufton	169		
Conservative	Carolyn Flynn	145		
Independent	Daniel Richard Butler	66		
Majority				
Turnout				
Liberal Democrats hold		Swing		

== By-Elections 2008-12 ==
A number of by-elections were held during this period.
