= Llanwddyn (electoral ward) =

Former electoral ward of Powys, Wales

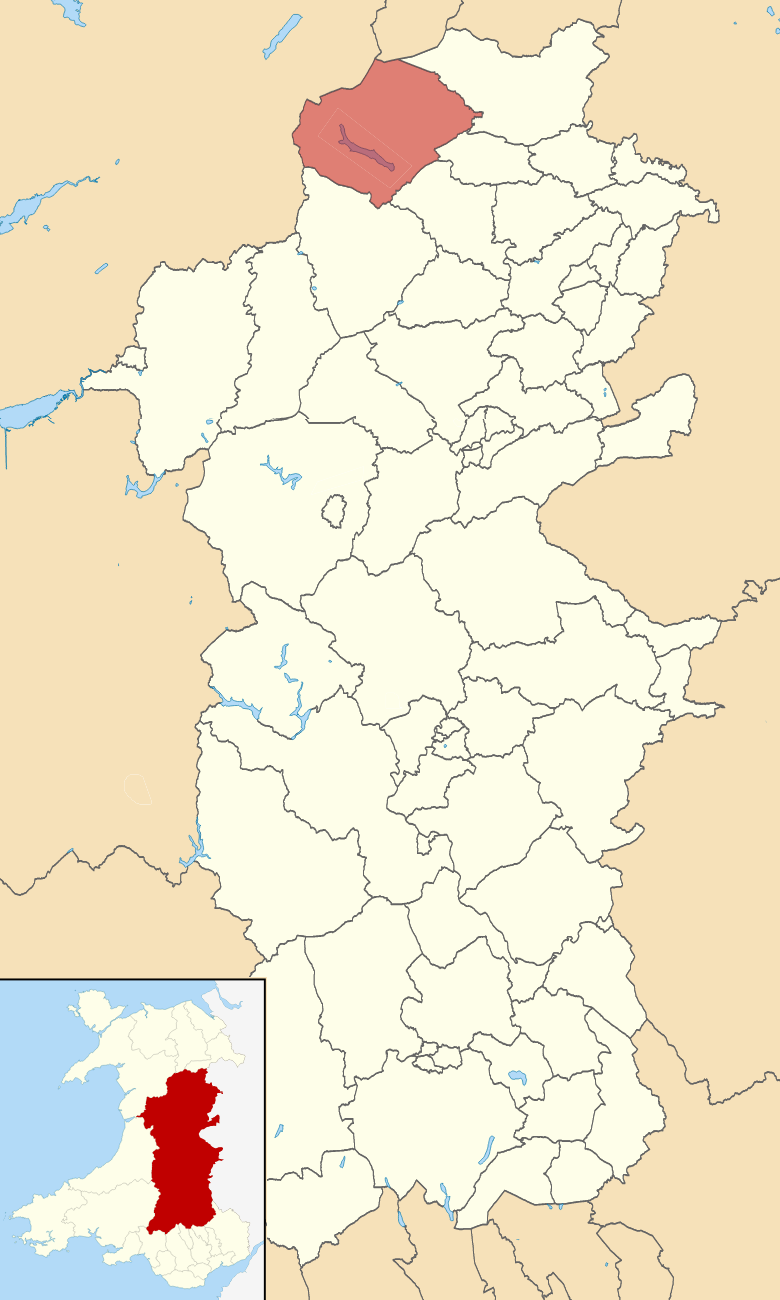
Llanwddyn ward location in Powys, Wales

Llanwddyn (Welsh pronunciation) was the name of an electoral ward in the far north of Powys, Wales. It covered the community of Llanwddyn (which gives it its name) as well as the neighbouring communities of Llangynog and Pen-y-Bont-Fawr. The ward elected a county councillor to Powys County Council.

According to the 2011 census the population of the ward was 1,036.

Following a boundary review, Llanwddyn was merged to become part of the larger ward of Banwy, Llanfihangel and Llanwddyn, effective from the 2022 local elections.

== County councillors ==
Conservative Party candidate Simon Baynes represented the ward following the May 2008 council elections. He stood down after only one term in office.

Independent councillor Darren Mayor was elected unopposed as ward councillor in May 2012 and became Powys County Council's cabinet member for property, buildings and housing. Cllr Mayor was a governor of Llanfyllin High School and resigned from the council in March 2016 because of irregular funding for the school's bus service.

Previous councillor Simon Baynes stood again at the May 2017 council election, but lost to Bryn Davies who won Plaid Cymru's first seat on Powys Council. Previous councillor Darren Mayor stood again but came fourth.

2017 Powys County Council election
Party	Candidate	Votes	%	±%
Plaid Cymru	Bryn Peryddon DAVIES	192	47.9%	
Conservative	Simon Robert Maurice BAYNES	159	39.7%	
Green	Jenny MATTHEWS	31	7.7%	
Independent	Darren MAYOR	17	4.2%	
Turnout		401	47%	
