= 1999 Powys County Council election =

1999 Welsh local government election

The second election to Powys County Council following local government reorganisation was held in May 1999. It was preceded by the 1995 election and followed by the 2004 election. The election resulted once again in a majority of Independent councillors.

== Results Overview ==
Powys County Council election result 1999
Party	Seats	Gains	Losses	Net gain/loss	Seats %	Votes %	Votes	+/−
Labour	6							
Conservative	0							
Liberal Democrats	10							
Plaid Cymru	0							
Independent	57							

== Ward results (Brecknockshire) ==
=== Aber-craf (one seat) ===
Aber-craf 1999
Party	Candidate	Votes	%	±%
Labour	Cyril Gwyn Gwillim*	unopposed		
Labour hold		Swing		

=== Bronllys (one seat) ===
Boundary Change.

Bronllys 1999
Party	Candidate	Votes	%	±%
Independent	Stephen Davies	274		
Independent	Adrian John Willford	105		
Liberal Democrats	Sir John Royden Maddox	100		
Conservative	Hilda Mary Williams	100		
Majority		169		
Turnout		58.0		
Independent win (new seat)				

=== Builth (one seat) ===
Builth 1999
Party	Candidate	Votes	%	±%
Independent	Edward Ernest William Sweet	456		
Independent	Jeremy David Pugh	444		
Majority		12		
Turnout			52.0	
Independent hold		Swing		

=== Bwlch (one seat) ===
Bwlch 1999
Party	Candidate	Votes	%	±%
Liberal Democrats	Gareth Jones	282		
Independent	Betty Lucille Greet*	157		
Liberal Democrats gain from Independent		Swing		

=== Crickhowell (one seat) ===
Boundary Change.

Crickhowell 1999
Party	Candidate	Votes	%	±%
Independent	Thomas John Probert*	676		
Independent	David John Addis	566		
Majority				
Turnout			51.0	
Independent win (new seat)				

=== Cwmtwrch (one seat) ===
Cwmtwrch 1999
Party	Candidate	Votes	%	±%
Labour	Bryan Wyn Davies*	unopposed		
Labour hold		Swing		

=== Felin-fach (one seat) ===
Felin-fach 1999
Party	Candidate	Votes	%	±%
Independent	H Jean Whittall*	unopposed		
Independent hold		Swing		

=== Gwernyfed (one seat) ===
No valid nominations were received.

=== Hay (one seat) ===
James Gibson-Watt represented a different ward on the previous council.

Hay 1995
Party	Candidate	Votes	%	±%
Liberal Democrats	Charles James Gibson-Watt*	330		
Independent	Richard George W. Booth	135		
Conservative	Mary Lesley Fellowes	114		
Majority				
Turnout			46.0	
Liberal Democrats gain from Independent		Swing		

=== Llanafanfawr (one seat) ===
Llanafanfawr, 1999
Party	Candidate	Votes	%	±%
Independent	David Rowland Price	336		
Independent	David Eiros Davies*	305		
Independent	Clive Gwennap Easton	72		
Majority				
Turnout			66.0	
Independent hold		Swing		

=== Llangattock (one seat) ===
Llangattock 1999
Party	Candidate	Votes	%	±%
Independent	Rowland Edgar Price Williams*	unopposed		
Independent hold		Swing		

=== Llangors (one seat) ===
Llangors 1999
Party	Candidate	Votes	%	±%
Liberal Democrats	Roger Hugh Williams*	Unopposed	N/A	N/A
Liberal Democrats hold				

=== Llangynidr (one seat) ===
Llangynidr 1995
Party	Candidate	Votes	%	±%
Independent	Muriel Rosemarie Harris	268		
Independent	Mary Taylor*	225		
Majority			59.0	
Turnout			66.0	
Independent hold		Swing		

=== Llanwrtyd Wells (one seat) ===
Llanwrtyd Wells 1999
Party	Candidate	Votes	%	±%
Independent	Timothy John Van Rees*	unopposed		
Independent hold		Swing		

=== Maescar / Llywel (one seat) ===
Maescar / Llywel 1999
Party	Candidate	Votes	%	±%
Independent	Evan Thomas Morgan*	unopposed		
Independent hold		Swing		

=== St Davids Within (one seat) ===
St Davids Within 1999
Party	Candidate	Votes	%	±%
Independent	Marilyn Roberts*	unopposed		
Independent hold		Swing		

=== St John (one seat) ===
The number of seats were reduced from two to one.

St John 1999
Party	Candidate	Votes	%	±%
Labour	Christopher John Mann*	651		
Liberal Democrats	Anthony Mark Morgan*	394		
Conservative	David John Chatfield	234		
Independent	Ian Howell Milton	74		
Majority				
Turnout			51.0	
Labour win (new seat)				

=== St Mary (one seat) ===
The number of seats were reduced from two to one.

St Mary 1999
Party	Candidate	Votes	%	±%
Independent	Susan Dawn Francis*	625		
Independent	Anthony Joseph Bell	401		
Majority				
Turnout			48.0	
Independent win (new seat)				

=== Talgarth (one seat) ===
The number of seats were reduced from two to one.

Talgarth 1999
Party	Candidate	Votes	%	±%
Independent	Ivy Brenda Lewis*	379		
Independent	Henry Lloyd Evans*	187		
Independent	Ronald Day	139		
Majority				
Independent win (new seat)				

=== Talybont-on-Usk (one seat) ===
Talybont-on-Usk 1999
Party	Candidate	Votes	%	±%
Independent	Dorothy Margaret Jane James*	unopposed		
Independent hold		Swing		

=== Tawe Uchaf (one seat) ===
Tawe Uchaf 1999
Party	Candidate	Votes	%	±%
Labour	Jean Maisie Jones*	unopposed		
Labour hold		Swing		

=== Ynyscedwyn (one seat) ===
Ynyscedwyn 1999
Party	Candidate	Votes	%	±%
Labour	Vivian James Gibbs*	unopposed		
Labour hold		Swing		

=== Yscir (one seat) ===
Yscir 1999
Party	Candidate	Votes	%	±%
Independent	Dorothy Gillian Thomas*	unopposed		
Independent hold		Swing		

=== Ystradgynlais (two seats) ===
The number of seats were reduced from two to one.

Ystradgynlais 1999
Party	Candidate	Votes	%	±%
Labour	Betty Rachel Watkins*	unopposed		
Labour win (new seat)				

== Ward results (Montgomeryshire) ==
=== Banwy (one seat) ===
Banwy 1999
Party	Candidate	Votes	%	±%
Independent	Beryl Vaughan	300		
Independent	David Keith Roberts*	214		
Majority		86		
Turnout			74.0	
Independent hold		Swing		

=== Berriew (one seat) ===
Berriew 1999
Party	Candidate	Votes	%	±%
Independent	Sidney George Pritchard*	unopposed		
Independent hold		Swing		

=== Blaen Hafren (one seat) ===
The ward was previously known as Trefeglwys / Llangurig.

Blaen Hafren 1999
Party	Candidate	Votes	%	±%
Independent	Gwilym Thomas Evans*	unopposed		
Independent hold		Swing		

=== Caersws (one seat) ===
Caresws 1999
Party	Candidate	Votes	%	±%
Independent	Elizabeth Rachel Davies	601		
Independent	David Michael Jones*	430		
Majority				
Turnout			58.0	
Independent hold		Swing		

=== Churchstoke (one seat) ===
Churchstoke 1999
Party	Candidate	Votes	%	±%
Independent	Gwynfryn Courtnenay Hamer*	475		
Conservative	Ruby Annie Eileen Taylor	159		
Majority				
Turnout			52.0	
Independent hold		Swing		

=== Dolforwyn (one seat) ===
Dolforwyn 1999
Party	Candidate	Votes	%	±%
Conservative	David Graham Edwards*	unopposed		
Conservative hold		Swing		

=== Forden (one seat) ===
Forden 1999
Party	Candidate	Votes	%	±%
Independent	Frederick John Owens*	unopposed		
Independent hold		Swing		

=== Glantwymyn (one seat) ===
Glantwymyn 1999
Party	Candidate	Votes	%	±%
Independent	Gwilym Pughe Vaughan*	unopposed		
Independent hold		Swing		

=== Guilsfield (one seat) ===
Boundary Change. The wards of Guilsfield Within and Guilsfield Without were merged.

Guilsfield 1999
Party	Candidate	Votes	%	±%
Independent	David Richard Jones*	650		
Independent	Leslie Walter William Gretton	294		
Majority				
Turnout			56.0	
Independent win (new seat)				

=== Kerry (one seat) ===
Kerry 1999
Party	Candidate	Votes	%	±%
Independent	Kathryn Mary Roberts-Jones	396		
Liberal Democrats	John Derek Napier	320		
Majority				
Turnout			56.0	
Independent gain from Liberal Democrats		Swing		

=== Llanbrynmair (one seat) ===
Llanbrynmair 1999
Party	Candidate	Votes	%	±%
Independent	Hedd Bleddyn Williams*	333		
Liberal Democrats	Gwynant Huw Davies	166		
Majority				
Turnout			71.0	
Independent hold		Swing		

=== Llandinam (one seat) ===
Llandinam 1999
Party	Candidate	Votes	%	±%
Independent	Gwyneth Alice Sylvester*	unopposed		
Independent hold		Swing		

=== Llandrinio (one seat) ===
Llandrinio 1999
Party	Candidate	Votes	%	±%
Independent	Richard Graham Brown*	unopposed		
Independent hold		Swing		

=== Llandysilio (one seat) ===
Llandysilio 1999
Party	Candidate	Votes	%	±%
Independent	John Harold Evans*	unopposed		
Independent hold		Swing		

=== Llanfair Caereinion (one seat) ===
Llanfair Caereinion 1999
Party	Candidate	Votes	%	±%
Independent	Viola Elizabeth Evans	unopposed		
Independent gain from Liberal Democrats		Swing		

=== Llanfihangel (one seat) ===
Llanfihangel 1999
Party	Candidate	Votes	%	±%
Independent	William Barry Thomas*	unopposed		
Independent hold		Swing		

=== Llanfyllin (one seat) ===
Llanfyllin 1999
Party	Candidate	Votes	%	±%
Independent	John Ellis Bowen*	401		
Independent	David Barry Goodman	220		
Majority				
Turnout			59.0	
Independent hold		Swing		

=== Llanidloes (one seat) ===
The number of seats was reduced from two to one.

Llanidloes 1999
Party	Candidate	Votes	%	±%
Liberal Democrats	Gareth Morgan*	unopposed		
Liberal Democrats win (new seat)				

=== Llanrhaeadr-ym-Mochnant / Llansilin (one seat) ===
Labour won the seat in 1995 but subsequently lost it at a by-election

Llanrhaeadr-ym-Mochnant / Llansilin 1999
Party	Candidate	Votes	%	±%
Independent	John Henry Hughes*	412		
Independent	David Wyn Davies	377		
Majority				
Turnout			59.0	
Independent hold		Swing		

=== Llansantffraid (one seat) ===
Llansantffraid 1999
Party	Candidate	Votes	%	±%
Independent	Tegwyn Jones	448		
Independent	Elizabeth Jean Thomas*	267		
Majority				
Turnout			52.0	
Independent hold		Swing		

=== Llanwddyn (one seat) ===
Llanwddyn 1999
Party	Candidate	Votes	%	±%
Independent	Gwilym Thomas Tibbott*	unopposed		
Independent hold		Swing		

=== Machynlleth (one seat) ===
Machynlleth 1999
Party	Candidate	Votes	%	±%
Independent	John Michael Williams*	unopposed		
Independent hold		Swing		

=== Meifod (one seat) ===
Meifod 1999
Party	Candidate	Votes	%	±%
Independent	Eldrydd Mary Jones	334		
Liberal Democrats	Huw Llewelyn Gwalchmai*	151		
Labour	Philip Edgar Hookway	43		
Majority				
Turnout				
Independent gain from Liberal Democrats		Swing		

=== Montgomery (one seat) ===
Montgomery 1999
Party	Candidate	Votes	%	±%
Independent	Brian Penton Richards*	unopposed		
Independent hold		Swing		

=== Newtown Central (one seat) ===
The number of seats was reduced from two to one.

Newtown Central 1999
Party	Candidate	Votes	%	±%
Independent	Joseph Walter Griffiths*	453		
Plaid Cymru	Reginald Taylor*	321		
Majority				
Turnout			43.0	
Independent win (new seat)				

=== Newtown East (one seat) ===
Newtown East 1999
Party	Candidate	Votes	%	±%
Liberal Democrats	Louis Hedley Williams*	unopposed		
Liberal Democrats hold		Swing		

=== Newtown Llanllwchaiaran North (one seat) ===
Newtown Llanllwchaiaran North 1999
Party	Candidate	Votes	%	±%
Liberal Democrats	Dan Munford*	560		
Independent	Brian Breeze	277		
Majority				
Turnout			48.0	
Liberal Democrats hold		Swing		

=== Newtown Llanllwchaiaran West ===
Newtown Llanllwchaiaran West 1999
Party	Candidate	Votes	%	±%
Independent	Robert Thomas Davey	282		
Liberal Democrats	Derek Stanley Upton	218		
Conservative	Eleanor Wright	143		
Majority				
Turnout				
Independent hold		Swing		

=== Newtown South (one seat) ===
Newtown South 1999
Party	Candidate	Votes	%	±%
Independent	Robert Henry Mills	231		
Labour	Rina Judith Clarke	173		
Independent	Philip Bowell Watkins	89		
Majority				
Turnout				
Independent hold		Swing		

=== Rhiwcynon (one seat) ===
Rhiwcynon 1999
Party	Candidate	Votes	%	±%
Independent	Joy Gethin Shearer*	unopposed		
Independent hold		Swing		

=== Trewern (one seat) ===
The Conservative candidate had won the seat at a by-election.

Trewern 1999
Party	Candidate	Votes	%	±%
Independent	Ian Douglass Ferguson	277		
Conservative	Montague Lancelot Gaius Robinson*	186		
Majority				
Turnout				
Independent gain from Conservative		Swing		

=== Welshpool Castle (one seat) ===
Welshpool Castle 1995
Party	Candidate	Votes	%	±%
Independent	Joseph Stephen Richard Watson*	303		
Independent	Norma Christine Lovely	128		
Majority				
Turnout			38.0	
Independent hold		Swing		

=== Welshpool Gungrog (one seat) ===
Welshpool Gungrog 1999
Party	Candidate	Votes	%	±%
Labour	Gorge Edward Hugh Taylor*	unopposed		
Labour hold		Swing		

=== Welshpool Llanerchyddol (one seat) ===
Welshpool Llanerchyddol 1999
Party	Candidate	Votes	%	±%
Independent	Ann Holloway*	unopposed		
Independent hold		Swing		

== Ward results (Radnorshire) ==
=== Beguildy (one seat) ===
Beguildy 1999
Party	Candidate	Votes	%	±%
Independent	Alfred Edward Allen*	unopposed		
Independent hold		Swing		

=== Disserth and Trecoed (one seat) ===
The sitting councilor had been elected as a Labour candidate in 1995.

Disserth and Trecoed 1999
Party	Candidate	Votes	%	±%
Independent	Peter Desmond Speake*	unopposed		
Independent hold		Swing		

=== Glasbury (one seat) ===
Glasbury 1995
Party	Candidate	Votes	%	±%
Independent	Margaret Elizabeth Morris	665		
Independent	Rod Bailey	210		
Independent	Derek Victor Hills	113		
Majority				
Turnout				
Independent hold		Swing		

=== Knighton (one seat) ===
The number of seats was reduced from two to one.

Knighton 1999
Party	Candidate	Votes	%	±%
Liberal Democrats	Kenneth Albert Harris	628		
Conservative	Trevor Alexander Johnson*	439		
Independent	Janice Geraldine Harris	167		
Majority				
Turnout				
Liberal Democrats win (new seat)				

=== Llanbadarn Fawr (one seat) ===
Llanbadarn Fawr 1999
Party	Candidate	Votes	%	±%
Independent	Fred Barker*	unopposed		
Independent hold		Swing		

=== Llandrindod East/West (one seat) ===
Llandrindod East/West 1995
Party	Candidate	Votes	%	±%
Independent	Kenneth John Richards	270		
Liberal Democrats	William Philip Charles	234		
Majority				
Turnout				
Independent hold		Swing		

=== Llandrindod North (one seat) ===
Llandrindod North 1999
Party	Candidate	Votes	%	±%
Independent	Robert William Bevan*	544		
Plaid Cymru	Sian Rosmari Maredudd	96		
Majority				
Turnout				
Independent hold		Swing		

=== Llandrindod South (one seat) ===
Llandrindod South 1995
Party	Candidate	Votes	%	±%
Independent	Edward Brian Oakley	620		
Liberal Democrats	Dennis William Cleaton	275		
Majority				
Turnout				
Independent hold		Swing		

=== Llanelwedd (one seat) ===
Llanelwedd 1999
Party	Candidate	Votes	%	±%
Independent	Geoffrey Miles Worts*	unopposed		
Independent hold		Swing		

=== Llangunllo (one seat) ===
Llangunllo 1999
Party	Candidate	Votes	%	±%
Independent	Emlyn Kinsey Pugh*	unopposed		
Independent hold		Swing		

=== Llanyre (one seat) ===
Llanyre 1999
Party	Candidate	Votes	%	±%
Independent	John David Arthur Thompson*	325		
Independent	Leslie Gwyn Davies	226		
Majority				
Turnout				
Independent hold		Swing		

=== Nantmel (one seat) ===
Nantmel 1999
Party	Candidate	Votes	%	±%
Independent	David Owen Evans	unopposed		
Independent hold		Swing		

=== Old Radnor (one seat) ===
Old Radnor 1999
Party	Candidate	Votes	%	±%
Independent	Evan Michael Jones*	unopposed		
Independent hold		Swing		

=== Presteigne (one seat) ===
The winning candidate was elected as an Independent in 1995.

Presteigne 1999
Party	Candidate	Votes	%	±%
Liberal Democrats	Garry Richard Banks*	unopposed		
Liberal Democrats hold		Swing		

=== Rhayader (one seat) ===
Rhayader 1999
Party	Candidate	Votes	%	±%
Independent	Martin Anthony Pugh	468		
Independent	John Andreas Bufton	435		
Liberal Democrats	Richard Hugh Tyler	130		
Majority				
Turnout				
Independent hold		Swing		

== By-Elections 1999-2004 ==
=== Gwernyfed by-election 1999 ===
A by-election was held in Gwernyfed on 24 June 1999 after no valid nominations were received for the regular election.

Gwernyfed 1999 by-election
Party	Candidate	Votes	%	±%
Independent	Geraint George Hopkins	192		
Independent	Rufus Trevor Richard Price	141		
Independent	Aileen Mary Dixon	103		
Independent	Richard George William Pitt Booth	26		
Majority				
Turnout			41.0	
Independent hold		Swing		

=== Disserth and Tircoed by-election 1999 ===
A by-election was held in Disserth and Tircoed on 18 November 1999 following the resignation of P.D. Speake.

Disserth and Tircoed 1999 by-election
Party	Candidate	Votes	%	±%
Independent	Leslie Gwyn Davies	286		
Independent	David Edward Miles Worts	88		
Majority				
Turnout			40.0	
Independent hold		Swing		

=== Welshpool Gungrog by-election 2000 ===
A by-election was held in the Welshpool Gungrog ward on 24 February 2000 following the death of Councillor G.E.H. Taylor.

Welshpool Gungrog 2000 by-election
Party	Candidate	Votes	%	±%
Liberal Democrats	David Mervyn Gwynfor Kinsey	200		
Independent	Olga Rowena Suddell	127		
Majority				
Turnout			17.0	
Liberal Democrats gain from Labour		Swing		

=== Newtown and Llanllwchaiarn North by-election 2001 ===
A by-election was held in the Newtown and Llanllwchaiarn North ward on 12 July 2001 following the resignation of Councillor Dan Munford .

Rhayader by-election 2001
Party	Candidate	Votes	%	±%
Liberal Democrats	Richard Noyce	209	48.8	
Independent	Olive Elizabeth Sheriff	151	35.2	
Independent	Philip B Watkins	68	15.8	
Majority				
Turnout		428	26%	
Liberal Democrats hold		Swing		

=== Rhayader by-election 2001 ===
A by-election was held in the Rhayader ward on 13 September 2001 following the resignation of Councillor Martin Pugh.

Rhayader by-election 2001
Party	Candidate	Votes	%	±%
Liberal Democrats	Richard Hugh Tyler	254		
Independent	Elizabeth Fletcher Phillips	174		
Independent	Margaret Hughes	143		
Majority				
Turnout				
Liberal Democrats gain from Independent		Swing		

=== Llangors by-election 2002 ===
A by-election was announced for the Llangors ward and scheduled to be held on 17 January 2002 following the resignation of Councillor Roger Williams following his election as MP for Brecon and Radnorshire, Melanie Tunnicliffe was returned unopposed after being the sole nominee.

=== Crickhowell by-election 2002 ===
A by-election was held in the Crickhowell ward on 11 July 2002 following the death of Councillor Tom Probert.

=== Brecon St Mary by-election 2003 ===
A by-election was held in the Brecon St Mary ward on 30 October 2003 following the death of Councillor Susan Francis.

=== Dolforwyn by-election 2004 ===
A by-election was held in the Dolforwyn ward on 15 January 2004 following the resignation of Councillor David Edwards.

Dolforwyn by-election 2004
Party	Candidate	Votes	%	±%
Independent	Wynne Thomas Jones	480		
Independent	Richard John White	69		
Independent	Paul Michael Leonard Harris	39		
Majority				
Turnout			45.0	
Independent gain from Conservative		Swing		
