= County Hall, Llandrindod Wells =

County building in Llandrindod Wells, Wales

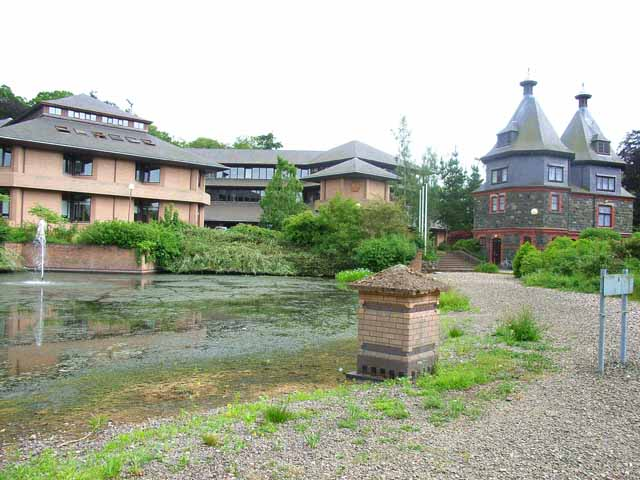
- The modern County Hall (on the left) and the old Pump House (on the right)

- Location within Powys

General information
- Architectural style: Postmodern style
- Location: Llandrindod Wells, Powys, United Kingdom
- Coordinates: 52.2378°N 3.3730°W
- Completed: 1990

County Hall (Welsh: Neuadd y Sir Llandrindod) is a municipal building in Llandrindod Wells, Wales. It is the headquarters of Powys County Council.

== History ==
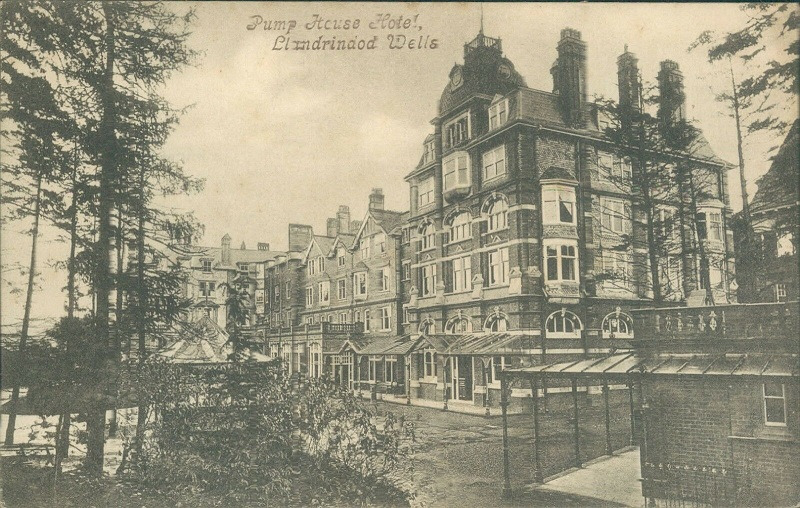
The Pump House Hotel, used by the County Council as their headquarters in the late 1970s and during the 1980s (on the left) and the old Pump House (on the right)

Following the implementation of the Local Government Act 1888, which established county councils in every county, it became necessary to find a meeting place for Radnorshire County Council: from an early stage the full county council established a tradition of holding its meetings at the Pump House Hotel on Spa Road East in Llandrindod Wells. However, the county council also needed premises for council officers and their departments and established the "County Buildings" in the High Street at Llandrindod Wells in 1909. The county council then moved their staff to larger offices at the former Gwalia Hotel in Ithon Road in 1950.

Following the implementation of the Local Government Act 1972, Radnorshire County Council was abolished and the new Powys County Council decided to acquire the disused Pump House Hotel, not just as their meeting place but for use as their office headquarters as well, in 1974. (Note: The Pump House Hotel had its origins in an early 18th century farmhouse known as Bach y Craig; after a saline and a sulphur spring was found on the farm in 1736, the medicinal properties of the spring were publicised by a German physician, Diederick Linden, in 1756. After a change of ownership in 1868, the aging hotel was replaced by a modern structure designed by Shepherd & Sons of Cardiff which was completed in 1888. It was used as a military hospital during the Second World War and then became a teacher training college in 1947 before being converted for use as a school for deaf people in 1950 and then falling vacant in 1971.) After the former hotel was found to be structurally unsound, county leaders decided to procure a new building; the site they selected was just to the east of the former hotel but still within its grounds.

The works began with the demolition of the Pump House Hotel: the former pump house itself, where the mineral spring had been used for the treatment of patients, was retained. The new building, which was designed in the Postmodern style as a series of connected pavilions, was officially opened on 27 November 1990.

The county council moved its archives centre off the cramped County Hall site to new premises in Ddole Road in October 2017. It then sought planning permission (from its own planning committee) to expand the capacity of the County Hall complex, by erecting a single storey extension and a new reception hall, in February 2020.

Works of art in County Hall include a portrait of Queen Elizabeth II by Leonard Boden.
