= Talybont-on-Usk (electoral ward) =

Talybont-on-Usk ward
- Electoral ward
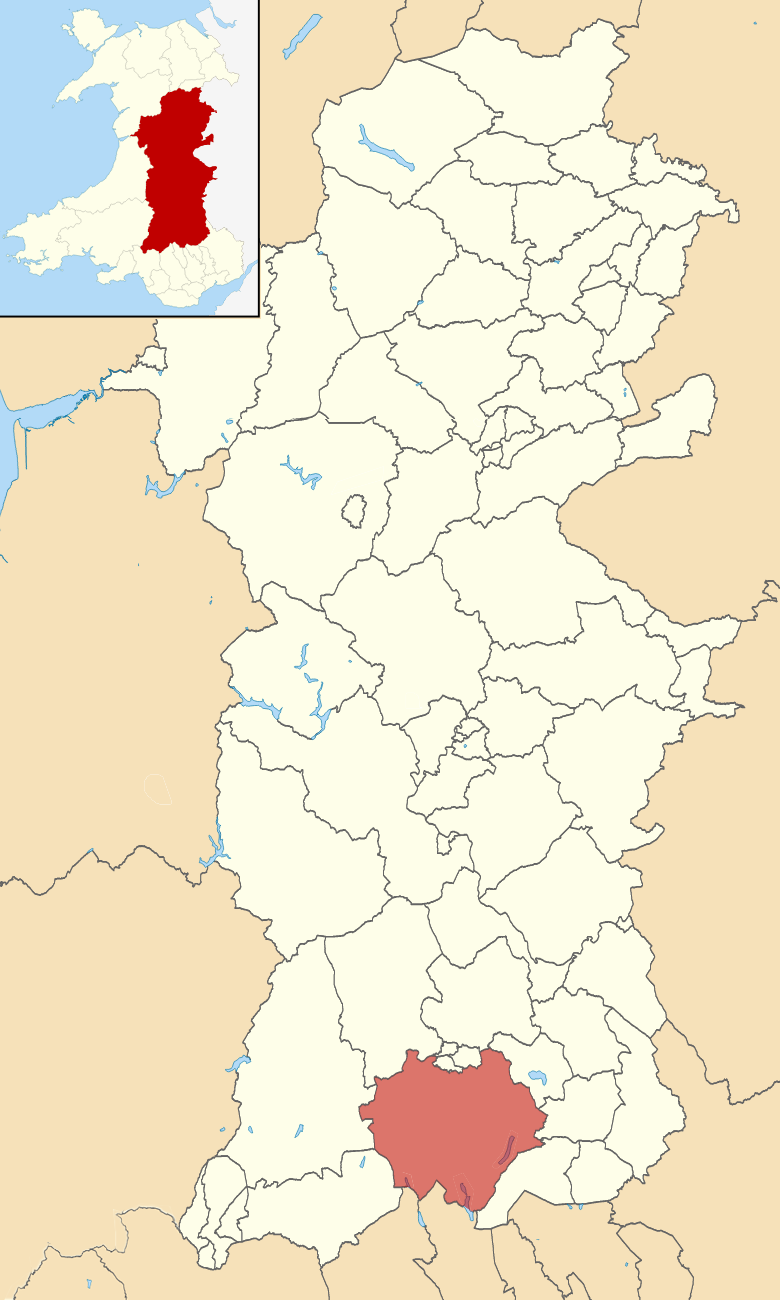
- Location of Talybont-on-Usk ward in Powys
- Population: 1,923 (2011 census)
- Principal area: Powys
- Country: Wales
- Sovereign state: United Kingdom
- Post town: BRECON
- Dialling code: 01874
- UK Parliament: Brecon and Radnorshire
- Senedd Cymru – Welsh Parliament: Brecon and Radnorshire
- Councillors: 1 (County)

Talybont-on-Usk is an electoral ward in the south of Powys, Wales. It covers three local government communities and elects a councillor to Powys County Council.

== Description ==
The Talybont-on-Usk ward covers the communities of Glyn Tarell, Llanfrynach and Talybont-on-Usk, with the populated areas lying to the north of the ward, south of the town of Brecon.

The ward was created by The County of Powys (Electoral Arrangements) Order 1998. Prior to 1998 the ward was called Llanfrynach/Talybont-on-Usk.

According to the 2011 UK Census the population of the ward was 1,923.

== County elections ==
Since the May 1999 local government election, it has been represented by one county councillor on Powys County Council, though there has only been an election held in 2008 and 2012 (when there was more than one candidate standing). Councillor Liam Fitzpatrick retained his seat unopposed in May 2017. He had been councillor for the ward since 2008, initially as a Liberal Democrat but as an independent in subsequent contests. He served as a Liberal Democrat in the county council cabinet in 2011 and returned in 2017 as Independent cabinet member for Highways.

Prior to 2008 the ward had been represented by Independent councillor, Dorothy James. She had been a county councillor since 1973, previously representing Llangors.
