= Llandrindod Wells Library =

County Building in Llandrindod Wells, Wales

- Y Gwalia (Welsh)
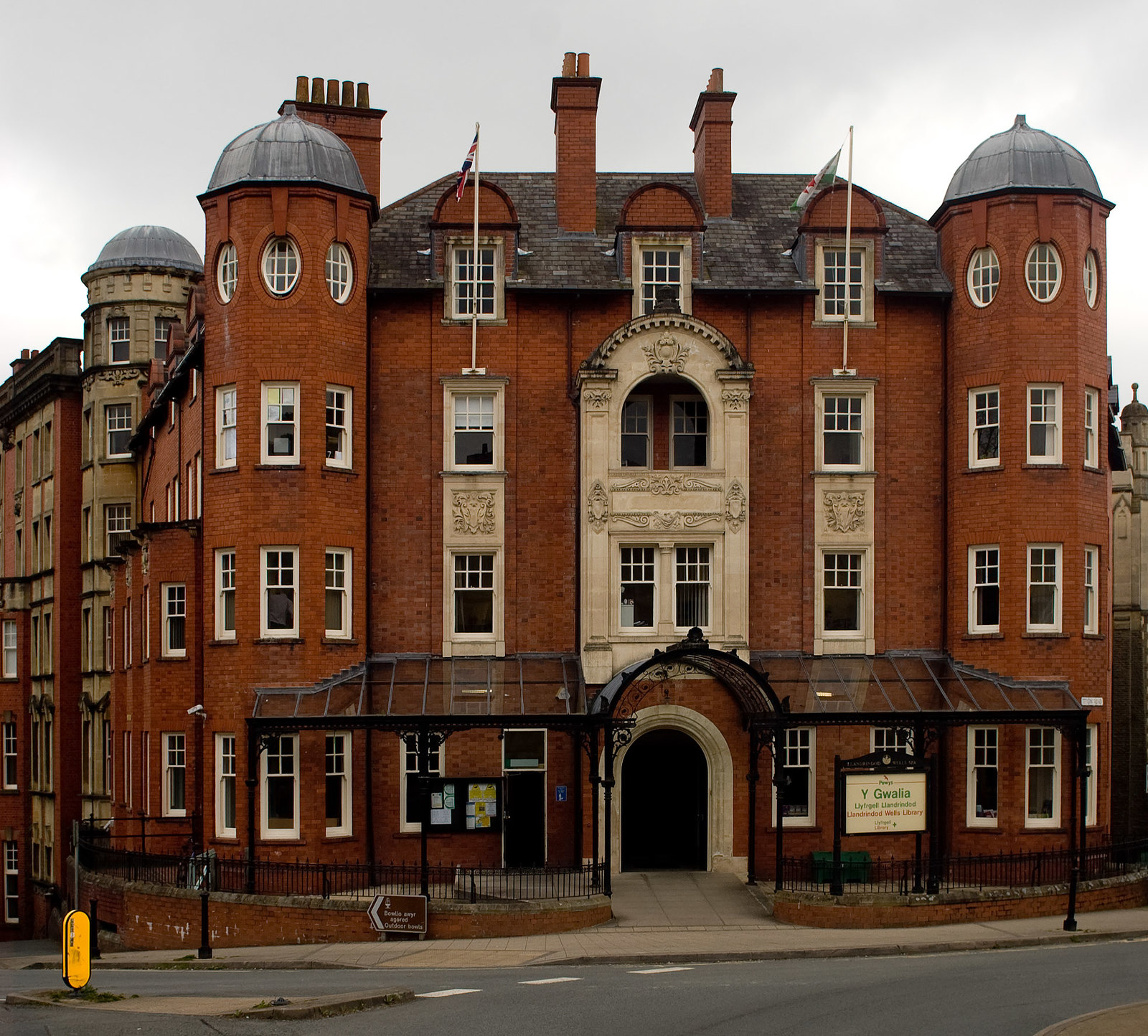
- Llandrindod Wells Library

- Shown in Powys
- 52.2398°N 3.3828°W
- Location: Ithon Road, Llandrindod Wells

History
- Built: 1900

Site notes
- Architect(s): Swash and Bain
- Architectural style: Baroque Revival style

Listed Building – Grade II
- Official name: Radnor District Council Offices (formerly Gwalia Hotel)
- Designated: 30 September 1985
- Reference no.: 9055

Llandrindod Wells Library, is located in The Gwalia, (Welsh: Y Gwalia) which is a municipal building on Ithon Road, Llandrindod Wells, Powys, Wales. The structure, which was the headquarters of Radnorshire District Council, is now a customer service point for Powys County Council, and also features a public library. The building is a Grade II listed building.

== History ==
The Gwalia Hotel was originally established on the north side of Ithon Road in around 1870. The guests came to the hotel to "take the waters" at the natural springs in Rock Park. As the hotel became more popular, the owners decided to commission a larger hotel on the south side of Ithon Road.

The new building was designed by Swash and Bain of Newport in the Baroque Revival style, built in red brick with stone dressings and was officially opened in 1900. The design involved a symmetrical main frontage with five bays facing onto the corner of Norton Terrace and Ithon Road. The central bay featured a round headed doorway on the ground floor; there were pairs of sash windows on the first and second floors flanked by ornate Ionic order pilasters which spanned both floors and supported a modillioned segmental pediment with a shield in the tympanum. The flanking bays were fenestrated by sash windows on the first and second floors with ornate stone panels between the two floors. At attic level, there were dormer windows with segmental pediments in the three central bays. The end bays took the form of octagonal towers surmounted by domes.

The hotel became a fashionable destination: visitors included the future Prime Minister, David Lloyd George, who stayed there in 1903, 1904 and again in 1905. The composer, Sir Edward Elgar, stayed at the hotel in 1909, and David Lloyd George's mistress, Frances Stevenson, sent him love letters from the hotel in August 1925. The building was requisitioned for military use during the Second World War, and, following a general loss of interest in health spas, never re-opened after the war. It was sold at auction by auctioneers, Campbell & Edwards, at the Lansdowne Sale Rooms on 21 September 1948.

The building was acquired by Radnorshire County Council and the council officers and their departments, who had been based in the "County Buildings" in the High Street at Llandrindod Wells since 1909, moved into the former hotel in 1950. Following local government reorganisation in 1974, the building became the headquarters of Radnorshire District Council, and, following the introduction of unitary authorities in 1996, it became a customer service point for Powys County Council. The local library, which had been based Beaufort Road, relocated into the building to collocate with the customer service point in 2014.
