= Powys County Council =

Local government of Powys, Wales

Powys County Council Cyngor Sir Powys (Welsh)

Type
- Type: Principal council of Powys

History
- Founded: 1 April 1974
- Preceded by: Brecknockshire; Montgomeryshire; Radnorshire

Leadership
- Chair: Geoff Morgan, Reform since 14 May 2026
- Leader: Jake Berriman, Liberal Democrat since 15 May 2025
- Chief Executive: Emma Palmer since 23 October 2023

Structure
- Seats: 68 councillors
- Graph of the party split among 68 seats.
- Political groups: Administration (33) Liberal Democrats (23) Labour (9) Green (1) Other parties (35) Conservative (13) Plaid Cymru (4) Reform (3) Independent (15)
- Length of term: 5 years

Elections
- Voting system: First past the post
- Last election: 5 May 2022
- Next election: 6 May 2027

Meeting place
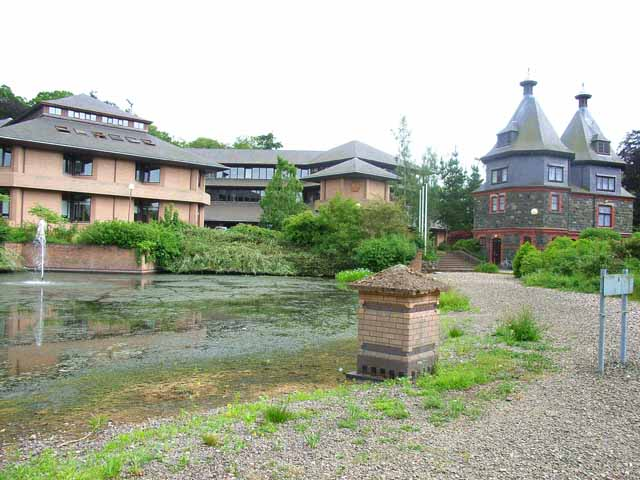
- County Hall, Spa Road East, Llandrindod Wells, LD1 5LG

Website
- www.powys.gov.uk

Powys County Council (Welsh: Cyngor Sir Powys) is the local authority for Powys, one of the principal areas of Wales. The council is based at County Hall in Llandrindod Wells.

== History ==
The county of Powys was created on 1 April 1974 under the Local Government Act 1972, covering the area of the three administrative counties of Brecknockshire, (Note: Except Brynmawr and Llanelly, which were transferred to Gwent, and Penderyn and Vaynor, which were transferred to Mid Glamorgan.) Montgomeryshire, and Radnorshire, which were abolished at the same time. From 1974 until 1996 there were two principal tiers of local government, with Powys County Council as the upper tier authority and three district councils below it, each of which corresponded to one of the pre-1974 counties: Brecknock Borough Council, Montgomeryshire District Council, and Radnorshire District Council.

The three districts were abolished under the Local Government (Wales) Act 1994, with Powys County Council becoming a unitary authority with effect from 1 April 1996, taking on the functions formerly performed by the district councils.

== Political control ==
The council has been under no overall control since 2017. Following the 2022 election a Liberal Democrat and Labour coalition formed to take control of the council. The Green councillor later joined the coalition.

The first election to the council was held in 1973, initially operating as a shadow authority before coming into its powers on 1 April 1974. Political control of the council since 1974 has been as follows:

Upper-tier county council

Party in control	Years
Independent	1974–1996

Unitary authority

Party in control	Years
Independent	1996–2017
No overall control	2017–present

=== Leadership ===
The leaders of the council since 2002 (formally called the chairman of the board prior to 2011) have been:

Councillor	Party	From	To
Michael Jones	Independent	2002	17 May 2012
David Jones	Independent	17 May 2012	10 Jan 2014
Barry Thomas	Independent	10 Jan 2014	May 2017
Rosemarie Harris	Independent	18 May 2017	May 2022
James Gibson-Watt	Liberal Democrats	26 May 2022	15 May 2025
Jake Berriman	Liberal Democrats	15 May 2025	

=== Composition ===
Following the 2022 election and subsequent by-elections and changes of allegiance up to October 2026, the composition of the council was:

Party	Seats
Liberal Democrats	23
Conservative	13
Labour	9
Plaid Cymru	4
Reform	3
Green	1
Independent	15
Total	68

Of the independent councillors, fourteen form the 'Powys Independents' group and the other one is not affiliated to any group. The next election is due in 2027.

== Elections ==
Elections are held every five years. Since the last ward boundary changes in 2022, 68 councillors have been elected from 60 wards. Prior to 2012, elections were generally held every four years.

Year	Seats	Independent	Labour	Liberal Democrats	Conservative	Plaid Cymru	Green Party	Notes
1995	84	**62**	10	8	3	1	0	Independent majority control
1999	73	**57**	6	10	0	0	0	New ward boundaries. Independent majority control
2004	73	**54**	4	15	0	0	0	Independent majority control
2008	73	**45**	4	15	9	0	0	Independent majority control
2012	73	**48**	6	9	10	0	0	Independent majority control
2017	73	**30**	7	13	19	2	1	Independent / Conservative coalition
2022	68	17	9	**24**	14	3	1	New ward boundaries. Liberal Democrats / Labour coalition

Party with the most elected councillors in bold. Coalition agreements in Notes column.

== Cabinet ==
=== 2022–present ===
Position	Holder	Political group	Ward
Leader of the Council	Jake Berriman	Liberal Democrats	[Llandrindod North]
Deputy Leader and Cabinet Member for a Fairer Powys	Matthew Dorrance	Labour	Brecon West
Cabinet Member for a More Prosperous Powys	Glyn Preston	Liberal Democrats	Llanidloes
Cabinet Member for Finance and Corporate Transformation	David Thomas	Labour	Tawe Uchaf
Cabinet Member for a Caring Powys	Pete Roberts	Liberal Democrats	Llandrindod South
Cabinet Member for a Safer Powys	Richard Church	Liberal Democrats	Welshpool Castle
Cabinet Member for a Learning Powys	James Gibson-Watt	Liberal Democrats	Glasbury
Cabinet Member for a Greener Powys	Jackie Charlton	Liberal Democrats	Llangattock and Llangynidr
Cabinet Members for Future Generations	Sandra Davies	Labour	Cwm-twrch; Ynyscedwyn
Cabinet Member for a Customers, Digital, and Communities	Raiff Devlin	Liberal Democrats	Talybont

== Premises ==
The council has its headquarters at County Hall on Spa Road East in Llandrindod Wells, which opened in 1990. The site was formerly occupied by the Pump House Hotel, which had been the meeting place of the former Radnorshire County Council from 1889 and then served as both the offices and meeting place of Powys County Council following the local government reorganisation in 1974. The old building was found to be structurally unstable in the late 1980s and it was decided to build a new county hall on the same site.

The council also has three area offices, being one inherited from each of the three former districts abolished in 1996:

- Neuadd Brycheiniog in Brecon, built in the 1980s as the headquarters for Brecknock Borough Council.
- The Gwalia in Llandrindod Wells, built in 1900 as the Gwalia Hotel, becoming offices of Radnorshire County Council 1950–1974 then Radnorshire District Council 1974–1996.
- Park Office in Newtown, built in 1968 as Newtown Town Hall, being the shared headquarters of Newtown and Llanllwchaiarn Urban District and Newtown and Llanidloes Rural District Councils, then used as an area office for Montgomeryshire District Council 1974–1996

The former headquarters of Montgomeryshire District Council at Neuadd Maldwyn in Welshpool also served as an area office for Powys County Council until 2019 when it was sold.

== Electoral wards ==
Electoral wards in Powys

Powys is administered by Powys County Council and has 68 elected councillors representing 60 council wards. Although it is a unitary authority, the highway functions of the council, along with the allocation of small grants, are delegated to the three Shire Committees. Brecknockshire has 24 councillors, Radnorshire has 15 and Montgomeryshire has 34.

Local elections take place every five years. Some of the electoral wards are coterminous with communities (parishes) of the same name. There are 112 communities in the principal area. Nearly all communities have a local community council.

The following table lists the council wards, the political group representing them, and the communities they cover. Communities with a community council are indicated with a '*':

Ward	Political group	Councillor	Communities
Aber-craf and Ystradgynlais	Labour	Huw Williams	Ystradgynlais* (part)
Aber-craf and Ystradgynlais	Labour	Sarah Williams	Ystradgynlais* (part)
Banwy, Llanfihangel and Llanwddyn	Plaid Cymru	Bryn Davies	Banwy*; Llanfihangel-yng-Ngwynfa*; Llangynog*; Llanwddyn*; Pen-y-Bont-Fawr*
Berriew and Castle Caereinion	Conservative	Adrian Jones	Berriew*; Castle Caereinion*
Brecon East	Labour	Liz Rijnenberg	Brecon* (part)
Brecon East	Labour	Chris Walsh	Brecon* (part)
Brecon West	Labour	Matthew Dorrance	Brecon* (part)
Brecon West	Labour	David Meredith	Brecon* (part)
Bronllys and Felin-fach	Liberal Democrats	Thomas Colbert	Bronllys*; Erwood*; Felinfach*
Builth	Independent	Jeremy Pugh	Builth Wells*
Caersws	Conservative	Les George	Caersws*; Carno*
Churchstoke	Liberal Democrats	Danny Bebb	Churchstoke*
Crickhowell with Cwmdu and Tretower	Liberal Democrats	Claire Hall (since November 23 by-election)	Crickhowell*; Vale of Grwyney*; Cwmdu and District* (part)
Crickhowell with Cwmdu and Tretower	Liberal Democrats	Chloe Masefield (since November 23 by-election)	Crickhowell*; Vale of Grwyney*; Cwmdu and District* (part)
Cwm-twrch	Labour	Sandra Davies	Ystradgynlais* (part)
Disserth and Trecoed with Newbridge	Independent	Little Brighouse	Disserth and Trecoed*; Llanyre* (part)
Dolforwyn	Conservative	Gareth Pugh	Abermule with Llandyssil*; Bettws*
Forden and Montgomery	Green	Jeremy Thorp	Forden* (part); Montgomery*
Glantwymyn	Plaid Cymru	Elwyn Vaughan	Cadfarch*; Glantwymyn*
Glasbury	Liberal Democrats	James Gibson-Watt	Clyro*; Glasbury*
Guilsfield	Conservative	Ian Harrison	Guilsfield*
Gwernyfed	Liberal Democrats	William Lloyd	Gwernyfed*; Llanigon*
Hay	Liberal Democrats	Gareth Ratcliffe	Hay*
Ithon Valley	Reform	Geoff Morgan (Elected as an independent, before defecting to Reform in March 2025)	Llanbadarn Fawr*; Llanbadarn Fynydd; Llanbister*; Llanddewi Ystradenny*
Kerry	Conservative	Benjamin Breeze	Kerry* (part)
Knighton with Beguildy	Liberal Democrats	Corinna Kenyon-Wade	Beguildy*; Knighton*
Knighton with Beguildy	Independent	Ange Williams	Beguildy*; Knighton*
Llanafanfawr with Garth	Independent	Bryan Davies	Cilmeri*; Duhonw*; Llanafan-fawr*; Llanwrthwl*; Treflys* (part)
Llanbrynmair	Plaid Cymru	Gary Mitchell	Llanbrynmair*; Trefeglwys*
Llandinam with Dolfor	Reform	Karl Lewis(Elected as a Welsh Conservative, before defecting to Reform in March 2025)	Kerry* (part); Llandinam*; Mochdre*
Llandrindod North	Liberal Democrats	Jake Berriman	Llandrindod Wells* (part)
Llandrindod South	Liberal Democrats	Josie Ewing	Llandrindod Wells* (part)
Llandrindod South	Liberal Democrats	Pete Roberts	Llandrindod Wells* (part)
Llandrinio	Conservative	Lucy Roberts	Bausley with Criggion*; Llandrinio*
Llandysilio	Independent	Arwel Jones	Carreghofa*; Llandysilio*
Llanelwedd	Independent	Gareth Emlyn Jones	Aberedw*; Glascwm*; Llanelwedd*; Painscastle*
Llanfair Caereinion and Llanerfyl	Independent	Gareth Jones	Llanerfyl*; Llanfair Caereinion*
Llanfyllin	Conservative	Peter Lewis	Llanfyllin*
Llangattock and Llangynidr	Liberal Democrats	Jackie Charlton	Llangattock*; Llangynidr*
Llangors with Bwlch	Liberal Democrats	Sian Cox	Llangors*; Cwmdu and District* (part)
Llangunllo with Norton	Independent	Deb Edwards	Llanfihangel Rhydithon*; Llangunllo*; Presteigne* (part); Whitton*
Llangyniew and Meifod	Conservative	Jonathan Wilkinson	Llangyniew*; Meifod*
Llanidloes	Liberal Democrats	Gareth Morgan	Llangurig*; Llanidloes*; Llanidloes Without*
Llanidloes	Liberal Democrats	Glyn Preston	Llangurig*; Llanidloes*; Llanidloes Without*
Llanrhaeadr-ym-Mochnant and Llansilin	Conservative	Aled Davies	Llangedwyn*; Llanrhaeadr-ym-Mochnant*; Llansilin*
Llansantffraid	Conservative	Gwynfor Thomas	Llanfechain*; Llansantffraid*
Llanwrtyd Wells	Independent	Peter James	Llangamarch*; Llanwrtyd Wells*; Treflys* (part)
Llanyre with Nantmel	Reform	Claire Jonson-Wood (Elected as an independent, before defecting to Reform in March 2025)	Abbeycwmhir*; Llanyre* (part); Nantmel*; St. Harmon*
Machynlleth	Plaid Cymru	Alwyn Evans (Since 9 October 2024 by-election)	Machynlleth*
Maescar and Llywel	Independent	Edwin Roderick	Cray*; Llywel*; Maescar*
Newtown Central and South	Liberal Democrats	Kelly Healy	Newtown and Llanllwchaiarn* (part)
Newtown Central and South	Liberal Democrats	David Selby	Newtown and Llanllwchaiarn* (part)
Newtown East	Independent	Joy Jones	Newtown and Llanllwchaiarn* (part)
Newtown North	Liberal Democrats	Adam Kennerley	Newtown and Llanllwchaiarn* (part)
Newtown West	Conservative	Peter Lewington	Newtown and Llanllwchaiarn* (part)
Old Radnor	Independent	Edward Jones	Gladestry*; New Radnor*; Old Radnor*
Presteigne	Independent	Beverley Baynham	Presteigne* (part)
Rhayader	Liberal Democrats	Angela Davies	Rhayader*
Rhiwcynon	Independent	Heulwen Hulme	Aberhafesp*; Dwyriw*; Manafon*; Tregynon*
Talgarth	Liberal Democrats	William Powell	Talgarth*
Talybont-on-Usk	Liberal Democrats	Raiff Devlin (since November 23 by-election)	Glyn Tarell*; Llanfrynach*; Talybont-on-Usk*
Tawe Uchaf	Labour	David Thomas	Tawe Uchaf*; Ystradfellte*
Trelystan and Trewern	Conservative	Amanda Jenner	Forden* (part); Trewern*
Welshpool Castle	Liberal Democrats	Richard Church	Welshpool* (part)
Welshpool Gungrog	Liberal Democrats	Carol Robinson	Welshpool* (part)
Welshpool Llanerchyddol	Independent	Graham Breeze	Welshpool* (part)
Ynyscedwyn	Labour	Susan McNicholas	Ystradgynlais* (part)
Yscir with Honddu Isaf and Llanddew	Reform	Iain McIntosh (Elected as a Welsh Conservative, before defecting to Reform in March 2025)	Honddu Isaf*; Llanddew*; Merthyr Cynog*; Trallong*; Yscir*
