= Richard Booth =

English bookseller, bibliophile and literary publicist (1938-2019)

Richard Booth MBE
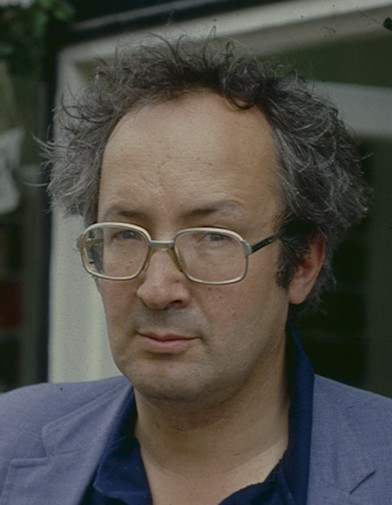
- Richard Booth in 1984
- Born: Richard George William Pitt Booth; 12 September 1938; Plymouth, Devon, England
- Died: 20 August 2019 (aged 80); Brynmelyn, Cusop, Herefordshire, UK
- Education: Merton College, Oxford
- Occupation: Bookseller
- Known for: Booktown Movement
- Style: King of Hay
- Political party: Socialist Labour Party (UK)
- Spouse(s): Elizabeth Westoll (m. 1969, div.); Hope Stuart née Barrie (m. 1987)
- Parent(s): Philip Booth (1897–1970); Elizabeth Pitt
- Relatives: Frederick Marryat (g-g-gf); Viva King (aunt); John Rudolphus Booth (cousin)
- Awards: MBE

Booth coat of arms

Richard George William Pitt Booth MBE (12 September 1938 – 20 August 2019) was a British bookseller, bibliophile and literary publicist.

Seated at Hay Castle, and a scion of the ancient Cheshire family, Booth established Hay-on-Wye as a literary centre becoming the self-proclaimed King of Hay.

Appointed MBE in 2004 for "services to tourism", Booth paved the way for the Hay Literary Festival.

== Early life ==
Booth was born in Plymouth, England in 1938. He was attended Rugby School and the University of Oxford. As a child, his father, an army officer, would take him to book stores, which fostered his love of reading. After his family inherited the Brynmelyn estate, they moved to Hay.

== Literary award ==
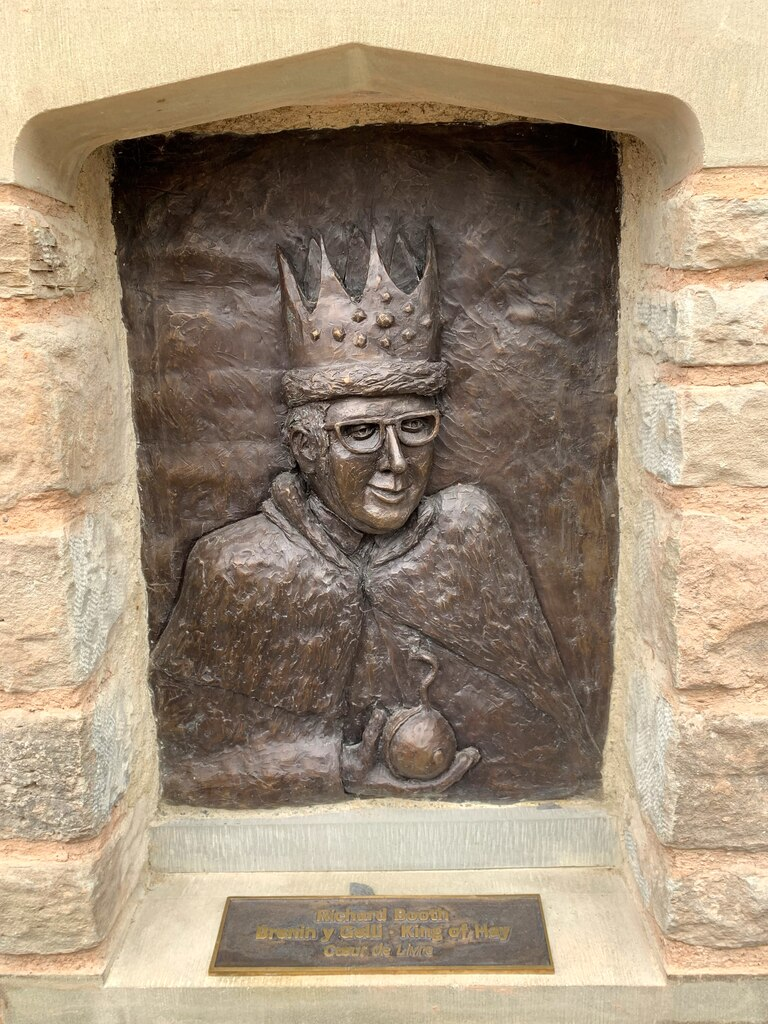
Booth "King of Hay" memorial tablet

In 2014, Booth gave his name to an annual literary award in association with the Hay Writers' Circle. Judges and winners of the Richard Booth Prize for Non-Fiction include:

Year	Judge	Winner
2014	Rachel Cooke	Jo Jones
2015	Colin McDowell	Emma van Woerkom
2016	Dan Davies	Juliet Foster
2017	Noel Kingsbury	Ange Grunsell
2018	Oliver Bullough	Marianne Rosen
2019	Phil Carradice	
2020	Rib Davis	Kerry Hodges
2021	Roland White	Gill Haigh
2022	Gilly Smith	Lily Rose King
2023	Tom Bullough	Kerry Hodges
2024	Dr. Alwyn Marriage	Jean O'Donoghue
2025	Alan Bilton	Michelle Pearce
2026	Ruth Pavey	Val Ormrod

=== Politics ===
Booth stood unsuccessfully for the Socialist Labour Party as a prospective AM candidate at the 1999 Welsh Assembly elections and for Wales constituency MEP at the 2009 European Parliament elections.

Welsh Assembly elections

Year	Region	Party	Votes	%	Result
1999	Mid and West Wales	SLP	3,019	1.4	Not elected

European Parliament elections

Year	Region	Party	Votes	%	Result	Notes
2009	Wales	SLP	12,402	1.8	Not elected	Multi-member constituency; party list

== Booth effigy beheading ==
In 2009, a revolt was held against the "King" by so-called republicans, led by bookseller and proprietor of Oxford House Books, Paul Harris, who journalist Sean Dodson called a "Cromwell figure". He was former employee of Booth's, reported as being "tutored at the knee" of the self-declared regent and helping him move large "lorry loads" of books from the United States to the UK, in an on-off "love/hate" working relationship that lasted over a decade. Despite Harris's leading of a trial of treason and symbolic "beheading" of Booth, they "remained on good terms". After becoming independent of Booth and setting up his own bookshop in the town, subsequently setting up a commonwealth, became the "first minister" and planned to set up a Speaker's Corner, which would establish Hay as a bastion of "free speech".

The "trial for treason" was not just a publicity stunt; like the initial declaration of independence by Booth, it was inspired by political concerns, but instead of economic decline, the rebels were inspired by concerns around the issue of gentrification. Though Harris is not recorded as having used the word, he was concerned about the threat posed to the independent character of the town by the over-dependence on the commercial, outsider interests of the Hay Festival, "saying, we cannot trade off the profile of the festival for 52 weeks a year". Indeed, Harris's prosecuting argument was that the Hay Festival had become too publicly dominant and had negatively impacted the economic fortunes of the many secondhand books shops that made up the town.

Harris argued that Booth, a promotional figurehead of the town due to his self-declared kingship, had been negligent in promoting the issues of the booksellers over the festival. He told the press in 2009, "You can fill a town with books, but that won't bring people to the town[...] You need publicity and promotion, which is now all sucked up by the festival. Richard used to be great at drumming up publicity and denouncing the festival. He's not able to do that any more, so we need to set up a council to replace him." and "My point is we've retired him, and if you have any respect for him then let him have a rest – he's 71." Another of the to-be commonwealth, bookseller and "Witchfinder General" Peter "Boz" Harries agreed, arguing that Booth had failed in his crown duty, adding, "We think this is a natural continuation. There are one or two locals who think it is rather cruel, but when Richard had his coronation in the 1970s a lot of locals were vehemently against him."

There were opponents to the republican mission, including Booth himself, who said "I don't think it's worth having an argument as they don't know what they're talking about [...] The revolting peasants are revolting." The founder of the Hay Festival Peter Florence was similarly dismissive, blaming the decreasing fortunes of the booksellers individually and saying, they "need to rethink their (business) strategy".

Several novelists spoke out in response to the planned trial and beheading, some in support, some against. Duncan Fallowell said, "I call the festival Waterstones-on-Wye. It's almost lost touch with intellectual value" but Matthew Engel said, "Many festival goers don't go into the town, but the idea that the festival detracts from Hay is clearly preposterous."

However, Harris argued that booksellers had seen a fifty percent decrease in sales in the years leading up to the revolt. Popular British novelist Robert Harris commentating at the time, sympathised with the booksellers, also suggesting that the recession and the internet had affected their fortunes.

The "beheading" of Booth's effigy took place on 27 September 2009 at the Old Butter Market in Hay town centre, with the rebels dressed as Roundheads and the pro-Booth Royalists like Cavaliers (contrary to his Booth family history). Paul Harris led the charge, and applause and jeers from the peripheries of the Butter Market could be heard when the fake head of Booth rolled into the bucket.

== See also ==
- Booth baronets
- Hay Festival
