= Llanfihangel (Powys electoral ward) =

Electoral ward in Wales

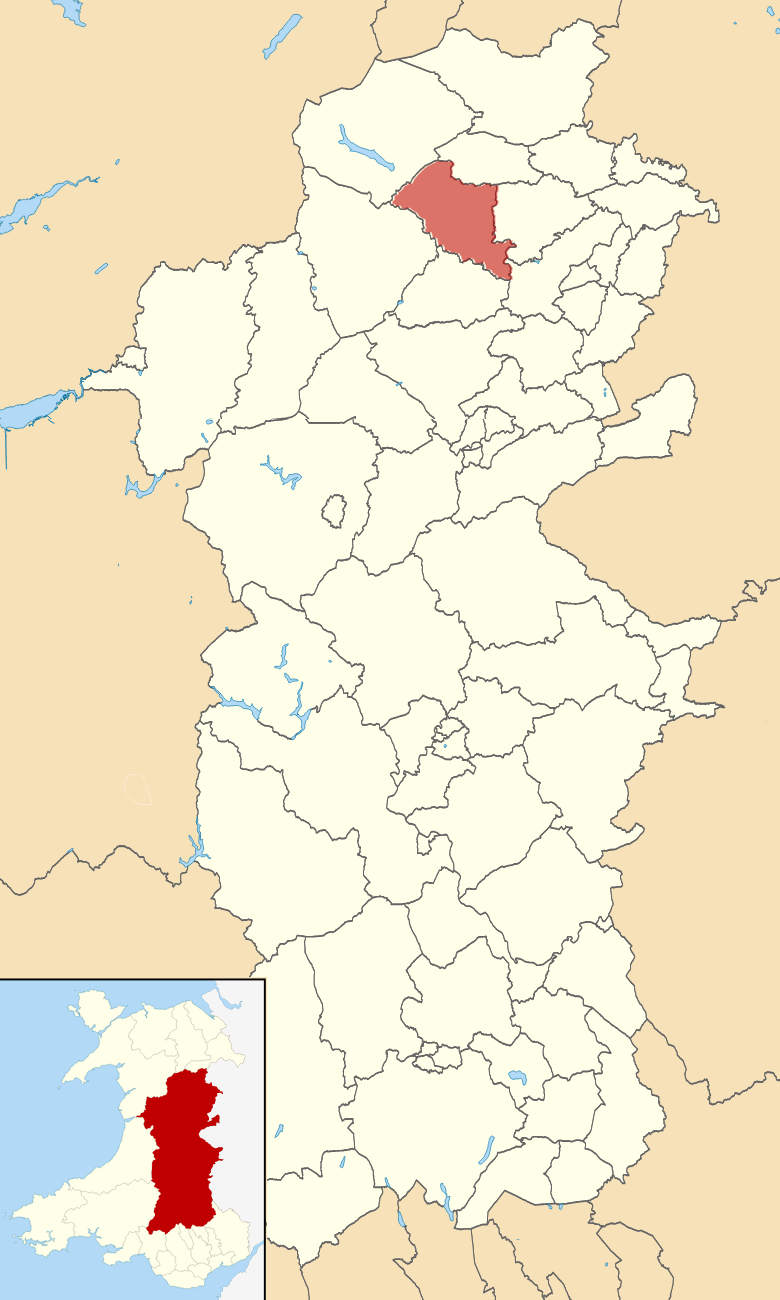
Llanfihangel ward location in Powys, Wales

Llanfihangel was the name of an electoral wards in the north of Powys, Wales. It covered the community of Llanfihangel (which gives it its name) as well as the neighbouring community of Llangyniew. The ward elected a county councillor to Powys County Council.

According to the 2011 census the population of the ward was 1,049.

Following a boundary review, Llanfihangel became part of the larger ward of Banwy, Llanfihangel and Llanwddyn, effective from the 2022 local elections.

== County councillors ==
Independent councillor Barry Thomas represented the ward on Powys County Council for 20 years until May 2017. He was leader of Powys County Council from January 2014 until he stepped down. He had previously been chairman of the council. Since first being elected in 1995 he had not been challenged for his seat and had been re-elected unopposed.

Cllr Gibson-Watt successfully defended the seat at the May 2017 election.

2017 Powys County Council election
Party	Candidate	Votes	%	±%
Independent	Emyr JONES	228	42.1%	
Independent	Pamela Jane JAMES	130	24.0%	
Conservative	Nick Powell	118	21.8%	
Plaid Cymru	Gary Adrian NORTHEAST	63	11.6%	
Turnout		541	60%	
