= Newtown High School, Powys =

Coordinates: 52.5081°N 3.3203°W

Newtown High School
- Newtown, Powys, Presteigne; Wales, United Kingdom

Information
- Type: Mixed non-selective comprehensive
- Motto: CYFLE - Caring Yields a Flourishing Learning Environment Perthyn Credu Llwyddo - Belong Believe Achieve
- Local authority: Powys
- Headteacher: Robert Edwards
- Gender: Mixed
- Age: 11 to 18
- Enrollment: approx. 1100
- Campus: Newtown Campus and John Beddoes Campus
- Website: Official school site

Newtown High School is a secondary comprehensive school for boys and girls. The school is based on two campuses in the towns of Newtown and Presteigne in Powys. It caters for pupils aged 11 – 18 years (KS3 and KS4).

== History ==
=== Former schools ===
In the 1950s, Montgomeryshire County Council, with their architect Herbert Carr and successive Directors of Education, T Glyn Davies and J A Davies, set about erecting new school buildings across the county. After the Education Act 1944, Newtown had three secondary schools: a Grammar School, in the former County Intermediate School opposite the railway station; a Secondary Modern School which had taken over much of Penygloddfa Primary School, and a County Technical School which had moved from old buildings in Penygloddfa into the army huts along Dolfor Road.

=== Grammar school ===
A team from the girls' grammar school won radio competition Top of the Form in 1956. The team was Elizabeth Lewis aged 12, Ann Humphreys aged 13, Noelyne Hopkins aged 15, and captain Isabel Stoner aged 16. The team beat The Royal School, Armagh by one point. The girls team competed against a team from Falkonergårdens Gymnasium in Denmark.

A boys team subsequently entered the radio competition in October 1968, part of the 21st anniversary series of former winners.

=== Comprehensive ===
It was the technical school site that was chosen for Newtown High School, which opened in 1957 as a comprehensive school, replacing the existing grammar schools. It became co-educational in 1964.

The school expanded over time, with additional buildings added in its first fifty years of use. This included the Art/Welsh block, Girls' Gym, Humanities (formerly English) block, Music (formerly History) block, Canolfan Cyfle (formerly Biology) block, Home Economics block, Sixth Form block and the Technology block. Work was undertaken in the late 1990s to add disabled access to many of the first floor areas, with lifts and ramps. An outdoor classroom/canopy was installed in 2015 on the site of the old demountable buildings. Further lifts and improved disabled access were installed in 2016.

The school also managed John Beddoes School in Presteigne in 2013/14, and on 10 April 2014, John Beddoes School was closed, and reopened as a campus of Newtown High School, named the John Beddoes Campus. The Newtown site became the Newtown Campus of Newtown High School. In April 2014, the school was expanded to a two-site model, as it incorporated John Beddoes School in Presteigne. The school now consists of the 'Newtown Campus' and 'John Beddoes Campus' of Newtown High School.

A revised school logo and new motto ('Perthyn Credu Llwydo', meaning 'Belong Believe Achieve') was introduced in September 2017. The school ethos of CYFLE (meaning 'Opportunity', and standing for 'Caring Yields a Flourishing Learning Environment') remains in place.

== Performance ==
With the combination of the two campuses, there are approximately 1100 pupils on roll. The school reached Band 1 in the Welsh Government banding system in 2012, and reached band 3 in 2013. It was rated 'yellow' in the 2014 Welsh school categorisation banding, and amber in the 2015 and 2016 banding. 100% of pupils achieved the Level 2 Threshold (5A*-C equivalent) in 2012, 2013, 2014 and 2015.

In February 2018 the school was placed in Special Measures after an Estyn inspection raised a number of concerns with results and pupils' attendance.

The High School received its most recent Estyn inspection report in 2018, the previous inspection was in 2009.

== School Campuses ==
The two campuses are in geographically distinct locations in Montgomeryshire and East Radnorshire. The Newtown Campus is larger, and also includes a sixth form, while the John Beddoes Campus includes the Ivor Hughes Centre which acts as a drama, assembly and meeting venue. The two campuses are roughly 27 miles apart by road.

== School Newsletter ==
The school has a newsletter for each campus which is produced to showcase student achievement and includes features of interest to students and parents.

== September 18th Lockdown ==
On Friday, September 18, 2020, the school went into lockdown after threats of a shooting were posted on social media. A firearm team were sent to the school by the local authorities, and three people were arrested. Further panic was set by social media users claiming there was a man with a firearm outside the school. The lockdown was handled by the headteacher, Mr Edwards, and the staff. The students left the school as normal at the end of the day.

== Other ==
- List of schools in Wales
- List of schools in Powys
