= List of schools in Powys =

This is a list of schools in Powys in Wales.

== Primary schools ==
- Abermule Community Primary School
- Archdeacon Griffiths Church in Wales School
- Arddleen Community Primary School
- Berriew Community Primary School
- Brynhafren Community Primary School
- Builth Wells Community Primary School
- Buttington/Trewern Community Primary School
- Caersws Community Primary School
- Carreghofa Community Primary School
- Churchstoke Community Primary School
- Clyro Church in Wales School
- Cradoc Community Primary School
- Crickhowell Community Primary School
- Crossgates Community Primary School
- Forden Church in Wales School
- Franksbridge Community Primary School
- Gladestry Church in Wales School
- Guilsfield Community Primary School
- Hay-on-Wye Community Primary School
- Irfon Valley Community Primary School
- Knighton Church in Wales School
- Leighton Community Primary School
- Llanbedr Church in Wales School
- Llanbister Community Primary School
- Llandinam Community Primary School
- Llandysilio Church in Wales School
- Llanelwedd Controlled School
- Llanfaes Community Primary School
- Llanfechain Church in Wales School
- Llanfihangel Rhydithon Community Primary School
- Llanfyllin Community Primary School
- Llangattock Community Primary School
- Llangedwyn Church in Wales Primary School
- Llangors Church in Wales School
- Llangynidr Community Primary School
- Llanidloes Community Primary School
- Llanrhaeadr ym Mochnant Community Primary School
- Llansantffraid Church in Wales School
- Maesyrhandir Community Primary School
- Montgomery Church in Wales School
- Mount Street Infants School
- Mount Street Junior School
- Newbridge-on-Wye Church in Wales School
- Penygloddfa Community Primary School
- Presteigne Community Primary School
- Priory Church in Wales School
- Radnor Valley Community Primary School
- Rhayader Church in Wales School
- Sennybridge Community Primary School
- St. Mary's RC Primary School
- St. Michael's Church in Wales School
- Treowen Community Primary School
- Welshpool Church in Wales School
- Ysgol Bro Cynllaith
- Ysgol Bro Tawe
- Ysgol Calon y Dderwen
- Ysgol Cefnllys (Llandrindod Wells Community Primary School)
- Ysgol Cwm Banwy
- Ysgol Dafydd Llwyd
- Ysgol Dolafon
- Ysgol Dyffryn Trannon
- Ysgol Glantwymyn
- Ysgol Golwg y Cwm
- Ysgol Gymraeg Dyffryn y Glowyr
- Ysgol Gymraeg Y Trallwng
- Ysgol Gynradd Carno
- Ysgol Llanbrynmair
- Ysgol Meifod
- Ysgol Pennant
- Ysgol Pontrobert
- Ysgol Rhiw Bechan
- Ysgol Trefonnen
- Ysgol y Cribarth
- Ysgol y Mynydd Du
- Ysgol-y-Bannau

== Secondary schools ==
- Brecon High School
- Ysgol Calon Cymru (dual campus, formerly Builth Wells High School and Llandrindod Wells High School)
- Crickhowell High School
- Gwernyfed High School
- Llanidloes High School
- Maesydderwen Comprehensive School
- Newtown High School (dual campus, formerly Newtown High School, Newtown and John Beddoes School, Presteigne)
- Welshpool High School

== All-age schools ==
- Ysgol Bro Hyddgen (3-18 years)
- Ysgol Llanfyllin (3-18 years)
- Ysgol Bro Caereinion (3-18 years)

== Special schools ==
- Ysgol Cedewain
- Ysgol Neuadd Brynllywarch Hall
- Ysgol Penmaes

== Independent Special schools ==
- Ty Orbis Special School (Owned by Orbis Schools)

== Independent schools ==
- Christ College, Brecon
- OneSchool Global UK, Newtown
