= Sheep Music =

Music festival in Wales

Coordinates: 52.27711631°N 3.01421574°W

Sheep Music is a three-day world music festival which takes place during July each year in Presteigne. It has 22 years of history, starting as a party on The Warden in 1991. Since moving to its current site at Wentes Meadow in the mid-1990s it has developed into music festival. In addition to several music stages, the festival also features workshops, craft activities, and local food and ales.

Logo

== Location ==
Sheep Music is currently held on community land known as Wentes Meadow, owned by Presteigne and Norton Town Council. This reserve is between the south bank of the River Lugg and the north-western edge of Presteigne, a border town located in Powys, Mid-Wales. It can be accessed from Joe Deakins Road and the B4355.

== Recent history ==
Over the years bands who have played at Sheep Music include Transglobal Underground, Zion Train, the Haggis Horns, Smerins Anti-social Club, Nizlopi, The Cat Empire and Attack and Defend.

In 2006, Sheep Music took a year's sabbatical and returned in 2007, with the event taking place on the weekend of 20, 21 and 22 July. The event was hit hard by the summer's wet weather when severe floods affected the region. The main site turned to mud, and the rising waters of the nearby River Lugg meant the camping fields had to be evacuated. Bands struggled to reach the festival through the flooded roads, and the festival was in danger of being cancelled on safety grounds.

Sheep Music was back in 2009. Friday night saw Sicknote play alongside the Hot 8 Brass band from New Orleans. Saturday night was tech-country rock band Yes Sir Boss warming up for Maroon Town. On Sunday the Destroyers (gypsy punk), 17 Hippies (European big band) Royal Gala (ska) Extra Curricular (nu jazz and hip hop) Ash Grunwald (Australian blues band) and Dub Pistols featured.

'Its good that Sheep Music is seen as a leading event in its field, however we are not a commercially driven festival, it would be nice to have the budget of say the Jazz World Stage at Glastonbury however we survive on a combination of good will and hard work. Fortunately after doing this job for many years now most of the industry are aware of our name and the events credibility. Bands want to work with us as they know we will make them sound good and provide a great audience. We carefully programme the event so there is constant variety promising the audience a truly rich and ear opening audio experience. Whether you're listening to a disc jockey or a ten piece marching funk band from South America, we have listened to them again and again...and perhaps been to see them live to ensure we are bringing you the best for your money...'

— Ivor Meredith one of the Festivals long standing music directors.

Sheep Music returned once again in 2012 and thanks to a combination of great bands including Lazy Habits and East Park Reggae Collective, good organisation and a bit of luck with the weather it was a massive hit. E festivals said (Sheep Music) "will be going straight in my diary for future years, as I had easily my best weekend this year, with its family friendly atmosphere and ethical approach, I cannot see anyone this festival would not appeal to"

It was announced in May that in 2013 Sheep Music will be holding a scaled-down two-day event by the name of "Pasture Bedtime" on 19 and 20 July again at Wendes Meadow in Presteigne, Powys. The Friday will feature Bristol Afro Beat Project, Sheelanagig and headline act They Say Jump, the Saturday will include Sam Green and the Midnight Feast, Joe Driscoll and Sekou Kouyate and will be headlined by OnlyJoe.

== Organization ==
Sheep Music is run by a limited company number 04427679, Sheep Music Ltd, incorporated on 30 April 2002. Sheep Music Ltd has also been a registered charity, number 1099690, since 26 September 1993.

The trustees responsible for the company currently number nine people. Decisions regarding the festival and other company operations are usually decided by a committee. The festival itself is primarily staffed by volunteers, who work in exchange for free entry to the ground.

Apart from the music festival, Sheep Music Limited also arranges other local music events throughout the year, which are usually held in either The Dukes Arms, Presteigne, or in The Royal British Legion, Presteigne. In addition to this, Sheep Music also supports an organization called Black Sheep White Sheep, a youth band run by John Hymas which meets weekly in the Assembly Rooms in Presteigne.

Due to the success of the 2012 festival the charity that administers Sheep Music were able to award grants in the local community to amongst others Gladestry Primary School, Mid-Borders Arts, Kington Little Orchard Nursery, Shobdon Primary School, Presteigne Youth Project and Knighton Church in Wales School totaling almost £7000.
