= John Beddoes School =

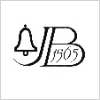

Location
- Presteigne, Wales, United Kingdom
- Coordinates: 52.2701°N 3.0024°W

Information
- Type: Mixed non-selective comprehensive
- Established: 1565; 460 years ago
- Status: Closed in April 2014 (immediately reopened as a campus of Newtown High School)
- Local Education Authority: Powys

John Beddoes School was a secondary or comprehensive school for boys and girls. The school was based on one site in the town of Presteigne.

It had a largely rural catchment area in east Radnorshire including the towns and villages of Presteigne, Knighton, Beguildy, New Radnor, Knucklas, Gladestry, Whitton and Norton. It was situated 1/2 mile away from the Welsh/English border and also educated pupils from Herefordshire and Shropshire.

During 2013 the school was placed in Estyn's Special Measures category. With the support of Newtown High School the school underwent numerous changes, however under Powys County Council plans, approved by Welsh Government, John Beddoes High School closed on 10 April 2014 to be reopened as a campus of Newtown High School on 11 April 2014. The two campuses both operate as part of one school with a single Senior Leadership Team.

== Foundation ==
Founded in 1565 it was the second oldest grammar School in Wales. It was founded by John Beddoes, a wealthy woollen manufacturer who provided for the establishment of a Free Grammar School to bring up the youth ... in virtue, discipline and learning. The school was to be maintained from the rents of local properties.

John Beddoes endowed the school with the rent from “Bell Meadow” to pay the ringer. He stipulated that should the Curfew cease to be rung then the school should be closed and the financial endowment revert to his heirs. With financial help from the composer Mike Oldfield the tradition continues today on the John Beddoes Campus.

The school moved to its current site on Broadaxe Lane in 1907.

John Beddoes Grammar School and Knighton Secondary Modern School amalgamated in 1970 to form the comprehensive school.

The school closed on 10 April 2014 against the wishes of the staff, pupils and the local community, to reopen the following day as a campus of Newtown High School. It retained the John Beddoes name, as the John Beddoes School.

== Notable former pupils ==
- Artist Joseph Murray Ince (1806–1859).
- Former world-champion bowls player, Rob Weale
- Motorcyclist, Chaz Davies
- Actor, Paul Reynolds
- Welsh hockey international Phoebe Richards

== See also ==
- List of schools in Wales
- List of the oldest schools in the United Kingdom
