= Mary Morgan (British murderer) =

Welsh murderer (1788–1805)

- Born: 1788; Glasbury, Powys, Wales
- Died: 15 April 1805 (aged 17); Presteigne, Radnorshire, Wales
- Cause of death: Execution by hanging
- Status: Executed
- Conviction: Murder
- Penalty: Death

Mary Morgan (1788 – 15 April 1805) was a young servant in Presteigne, Radnorshire, Wales, who was convicted and hanged for killing her newborn child.

While Morgan was from Glasbury, her story has been associated with Presteigne since her execution in 1805. She was employed as an undercook at Maesllwch Castle, the seat of Walter Wilkins Esq, the Member of Parliament for the county of Radnorshire.

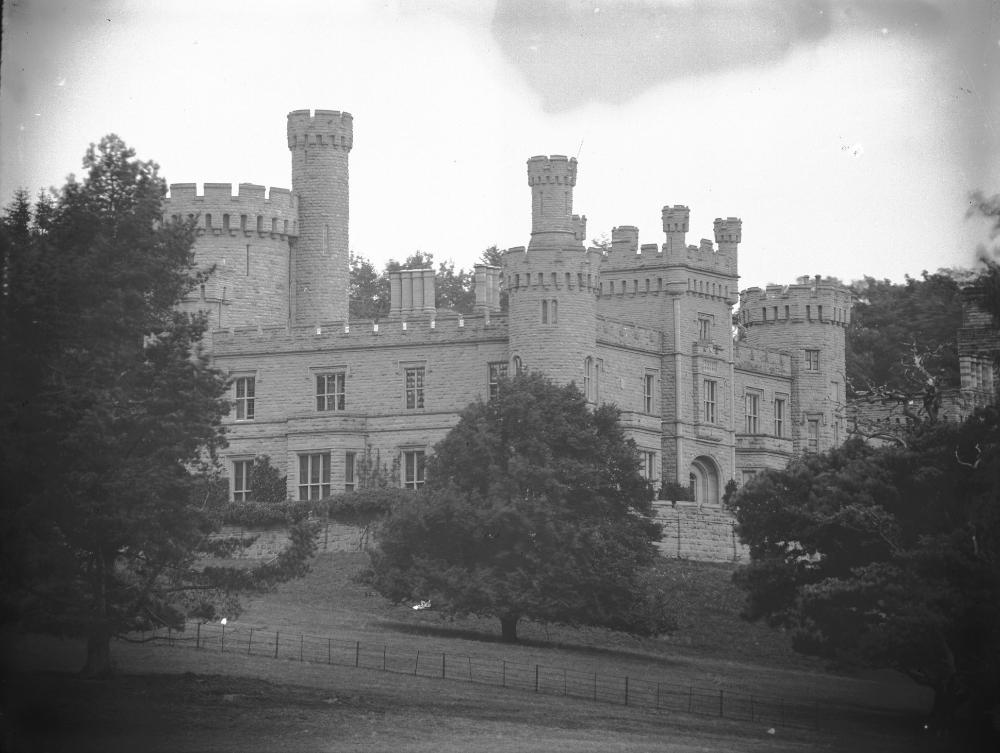
Maesllwch Castle

== The murder ==
Morgan was working in the kitchens in the early hours of a Sunday in September 1804 when she became unwell. She later went to her room in the servant's quarters of the castle. Early that evening the cook went to her room and accused Morgan of having given birth to a baby, which at first she strongly denied. Later, according to the evidence given by the cook, Morgan "owned that she had delivered herself of a child which was in the underbed cut open, amongst the feathers with the head nearly divided from the body, and the severely damaged intestinal system removed and placed underneath the child."

== Inquest and trial ==
The inquest on the baby was held at Glasbury two days later, and the Coroner's Jury found that:

Mary Morgan, late of the Parish of Glazebury, a single woman on the 23rd day of September being big with child, afterward alone and secretly from her body did bring forth alive a female child, which by the laws and customs of this Kingdom was a bastard. Mary Morgan... moved and seduced by the instigation of the devil afterwards on the same day, feloniously, wilfully and of her malice aforethought did make an assault with a certain penknife made of iron and steel of the value of sixpence... and gave the child one mortal wound of the length of three inches and the depth of one inch. The child instantly died.

Morgan was too ill to travel to Presteigne, where the Assizes were held, until 6 October. The trial eventually began in April 1805 before Mr Justice Hardinge, concluding on 11 April, when the jury found her guilty of murdering her child.

== Death ==
"To the Memory of Mary Morgan, who young and beautiful, endowed with a good understanding and disposition, but unenlightened by the sacred truths of Christianity became the victim of sin and shame and was condemned to an ignominious death on the 11th April 1805, for the Murder of her bastard Child.

Rous'd to a first sense of guilt and remorse by the eloquent and humane exertions of her benevolent Judge, Mr Justice Hardinge, she underwent the Sentence of the Law on the following Thursday with unfeigned repentance and a furvent hope of forgiveness through the merits of a redeeming intercessor.

This stone is erected not merely to perpetuate the remembrance of a departed penitent, but to remind the living of the frailty of human nature when unsupported by Religion".

— Powys Digital History Project - The Story of Mary Morgan - Gravestone inscription

"In Memory of MARY MORGAN who Suffer'd April 13th, 1805. Aged 17 years. He that is without sin among you Let him first cast a stone at her. The 8th Chapr. of John, part of ye 7th vr."

— Powys Digital History Project - The Story of Mary Morgan - Gravestone inscription

On 13 April Morgan was hanged, and was buried in what was then unconsecrated ground near the church later that same afternoon. Her public execution attracted large crowds, who watched as she was taken by cart from the gaol to the execution at Gallows Lane. She was subsequently commemorated by two gravestones in the churchyard at Presteigne.

== Myths and controversies ==
For some time after the execution, it was claimed the father of the murdered child was Walter Wilkins the Younger, the son of the member of parliament and high sheriff for the county and the "young squire" of Maesllwch Castle.
