= Llangedwyn =

Village in Powys, Wales

- Village and community
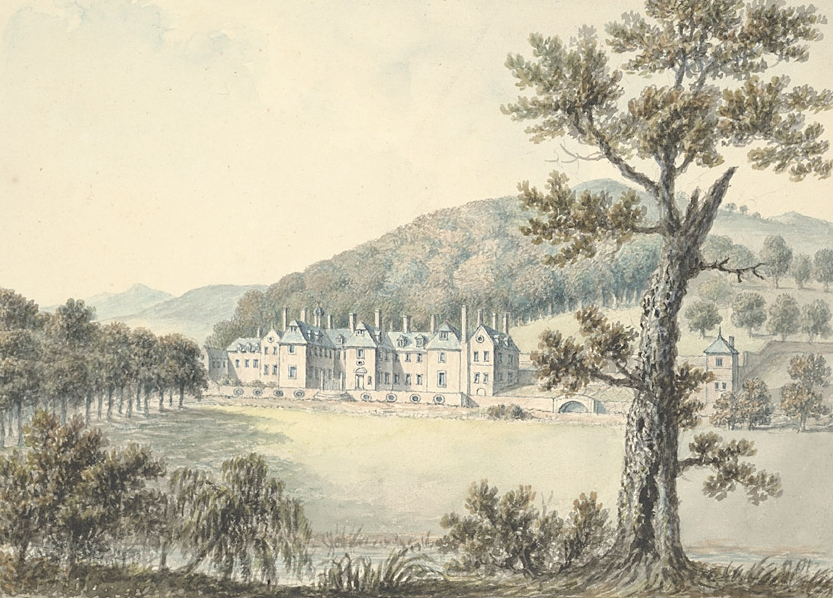
- Llangedwyn hall, 1795

- Location within Powys
- Principal area: Powys
- Country: Wales
- Sovereign state: United Kingdom
- Police: Dyfed-Powys
- Fire: Mid and West Wales
- Ambulance: Welsh
- List of places UK Wales Powys 52.80827°N 3.21050°W Community map: Map of the community

Llangedwyn is a village and community in Montgomeryshire, Powys, Wales. The population of the community at the 2011 census was 402. The community includes the hamlets of Bwlch-y-ddar, Pentrefelin and Pen-y-bont Llanerch Emrys.

It lies in the Tanat Valley near to the Wales/England border. It is approximately five miles from the small town of Llanfyllin and ten miles from the Shropshire market town of Oswestry. The Berwyn mountain range is nearby, as is Pistyll Rhaeadr waterfall. The ruins of Owain Glyndŵr's Sycharth castle lie a few miles outside the village towards Llansilin.

Sir Watkin Williams-Wynn, 10th Baronet, heir of Owain Gwynedd, lived his final years at Llangedwyn Hall. The hall is a Grade II listed building and its gardens and park are listed at Grade II* on the Cadw/ICOMOS Register of Parks and Gardens of Special Historic Interest in Wales.

== Landmarks ==
The church of Saint Cedwyn is located in the village. Llangedwyn Church In Wales Primary School closed in 2024.

There was a railway station by the village called Llangedwyn Halt, which was on the Tanat Valley Light Railway.

=== Listed buildings ===
The following are the listed buildings in the vicinity. The listings are all Grade II designated except Henblas and Plas-uchaf:

- Bontglantanat Farmhouse and Barn (II)
- Brynffynnon (II)
- Church of St Cedwyn
- Cowhouse Range at Sycharth
- Detached Agricultural Range to the south of Bontglantanat Farmhouse
- Fila Rhosyn
- Gatepiers and Gates at Llangedwyn Hall
- Glantanat Isaf
- Glantanat Uchaf
- Golfa Isaf
- Henblas
- Hendre
- Hendy
- Llangedwyn Hall
- Lofted Outbuilding at Llangedwyn Hall
- Lofted Shed Range at Llangedwyn Hall
- Milestone at Abercynllaith
- Milestone at Coed-y-wern-ddu
- Milestone near Green Inn
- Milestone opposite Llangedwyn School
- North Stables Range with Cottages at Llangedwyn Hall
- Octagonal Stallion Stable near Llangedwyn Hall
- Outbuildings north of Green Inn
- Plas-uchaf
- Pont Glantanat Uchaf
- Pont Llanerch Emrys
- Pont Llangedwyn
- Priddbwll-bach (old house)
- Rear Building at Green Inn
- Rose Cottage
- Shed, Bullhouse and Pigsties at Sycharth
- Stable Block at Llangedwyn Hall
- Sycharth
- The Green Inn
- Walls to Formal Gardens of Llangedwyn Hall
- Williams-Wynn Monument in St Cedwyn's Churchyard
