= Assembly Rooms, Presteigne =

Municipal Building in Presteigne, Wales

The Assembly Rooms, Presteigne
- Ystafelloedd Cynnull Llanandras (Welsh)
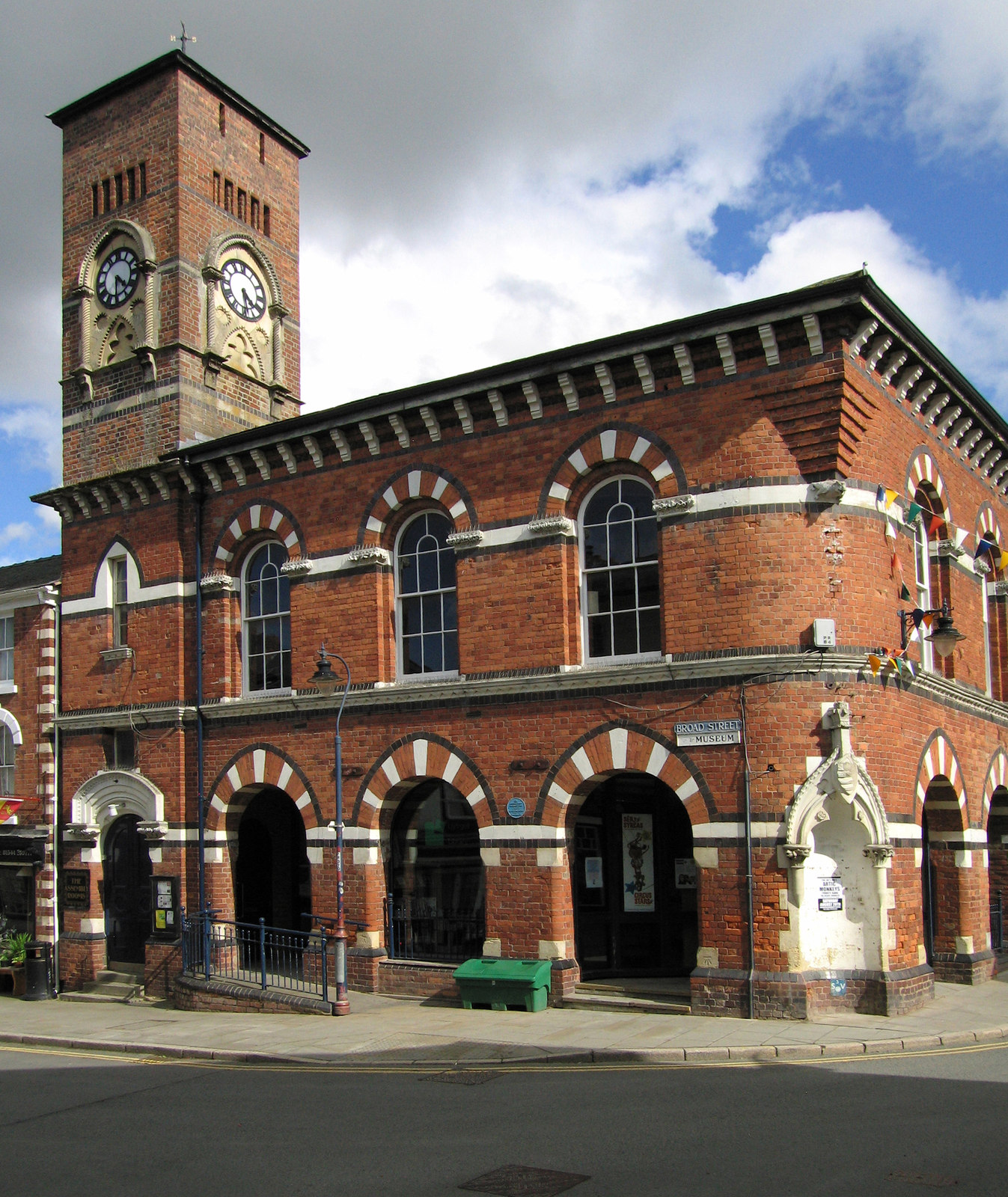
- The Assembly Rooms, Presteigne

- Shown in Powys
- 52.2734°N 3.0064°W
- Location: Broad Street, Presteigne

History
- Built: 1865

Site notes
- Architect: Thomas Nicholson
- Architectural style: Italianate style

Listed Building – Grade II
- Official name: Market Hall
- Designated: 26 March 1985
- Reference no.: 8852

The Assembly Rooms in Presteigne (Welsh: Ystafelloedd Cynnull Llanandras), formerly Presteigne Town Hall (Welsh: Neuadd y Dref Llanandras), is a municipal building in Broad Street, Presteigne, Powys, Wales. The structure, which accommodates a public library on the ground floor and an arts centre on the first floor, is a Grade II listed building.

== History ==
In the early 1860s, a group of local businessmen led by the local member of parliament, Sir Richard Green-Price, whose seat was at Norton Manor, decided to form a company known as the "Presteigne Market Hall & Public Room Company" to finance and erect a new municipal building for the town: the site they selected in Broad Street (Note: Broad Street, so called because of its significant width, had been the site of the medieval market.) had been occupied by the local post office and, before that, by the Black Lion Inn.

The foundation stone for the new building was laid by Lady Mary Jones-Brydges on 23 October 1863. It was designed by Thomas Nicholson of Hereford in the Italianate style, built in red brick with stone finishings and the market hall was officially opened to the public on 1 November 1865. The design involved an asymmetrical main frontage with four bays facing onto Broad Street; the left hand bay, which slightly projected forward, took the form of a three-stage clock tower with a doorway with a moulded segmental architrave in the first stage, a lancet window in the second stage and clock faces with ornamental stone surrounds in the third stage, all surmounted by a pyramid-shaped roof and a weather vane. The other three bays contained openings with voussoirs on the ground floor and round headed windows with voussoirs on the first floor. There were three bays finished in a similar style in Hereford Street and, at roof level, there was a wide cornice supported by brackets. Internally, the principal rooms were the market hall on the ground floor and the assembly rooms on the first floor.

In the early years of the life of the building, the assembly rooms were used for petty session hearings and the building was referred to as the "Town Hall". However, the company which had developed the building got into financial difficulty from an early stage and, in 1882, ownership passed to Elizabeth Abley who, as the principal lender, held a mortgage over the building. The borough council, which had not met for many years, was abolished under the Municipal Corporations Act 1883.

Following significant population growth, largely associated with the status of Presteigne as a market town, the area became an urban district in 1894. The new urban district council acquired the building in 1903 and used the assembly rooms as council offices and, following a decline in use of the market, converted the former market hall for storage of the local horse-drawn fire engine.

A cinema operated on the first floor of the building from 1934 until it closed in 1966. The building subsequently accommodated a furniture shop and then, after a period of disuse, Mid Border Arts, which had been established in the Shire Hall in 1988, moved into the assembly rooms in 1992. An extensive programme of refurbishment works costing £95,000, carried out with financial support from the Arts Council of Wales, was completed in 1995. The works included fitting out the ground floor for use as a public library and the first floor for use as an arts centre.
