= Shire Hall, Presteigne =

County building in Presteigne, Wales

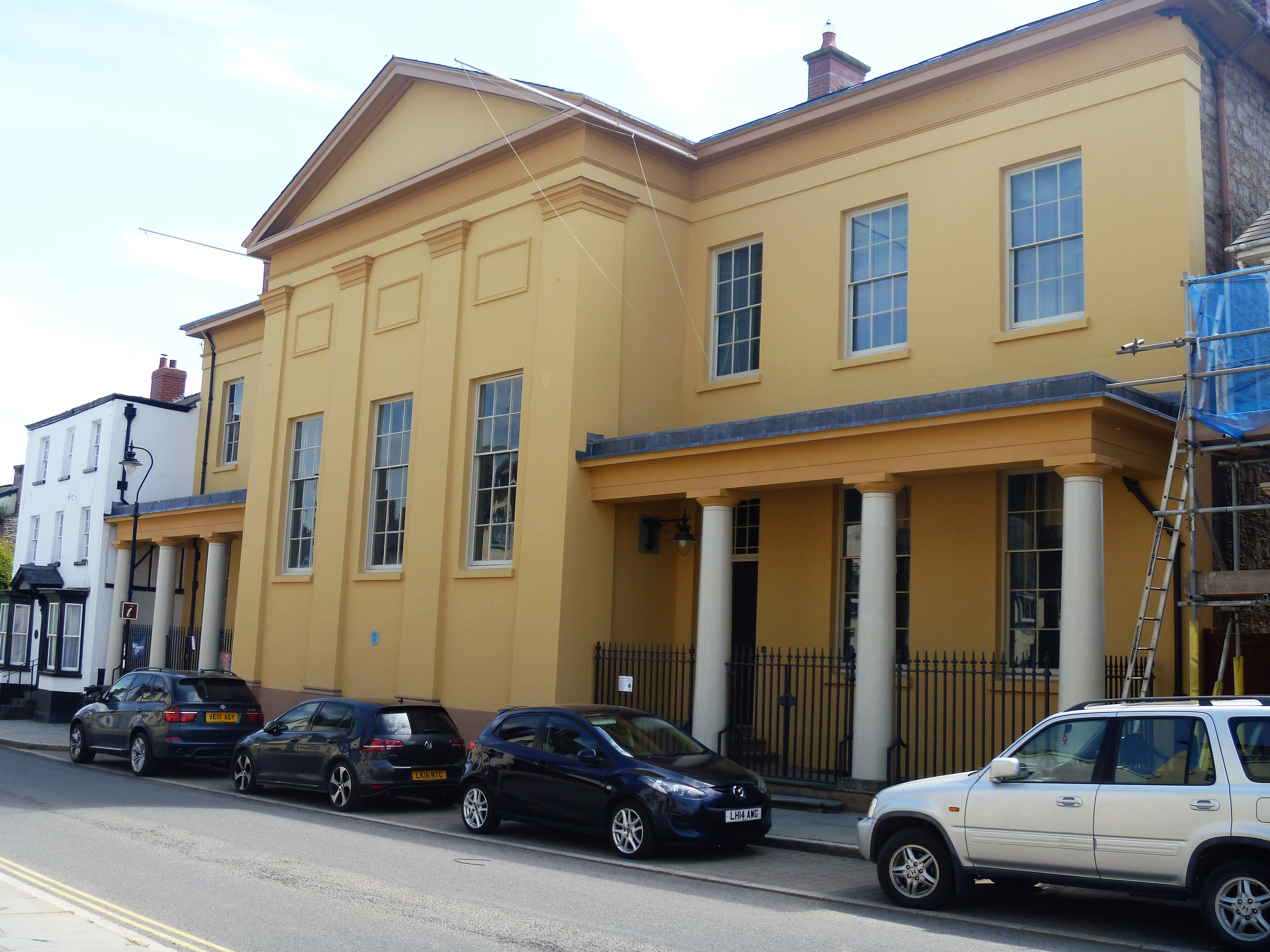
- Shire Hall, Presteigne

- Shown in Powys
- 52.2738°N 3.0053°W
- Location: Broad Street, Presteigne

History
- Built: 1829

Site notes
- Architect: Edward Haycock
- Architectural style: Neoclassical style

Listed Building – Grade II*
- Official name: Shire Hall including Branch Library and Museum
- Designated: 28 November 1950
- Reference no.: 8845

The Shire Hall is a municipal structure in Broad Street, Presteigne, Powys, Wales. The building incorporates a well-preserved courtroom and a museum known as "the Judge's Lodging". Once the judicial centre for Radnorshire, is a Grade II* listed building.

== History ==
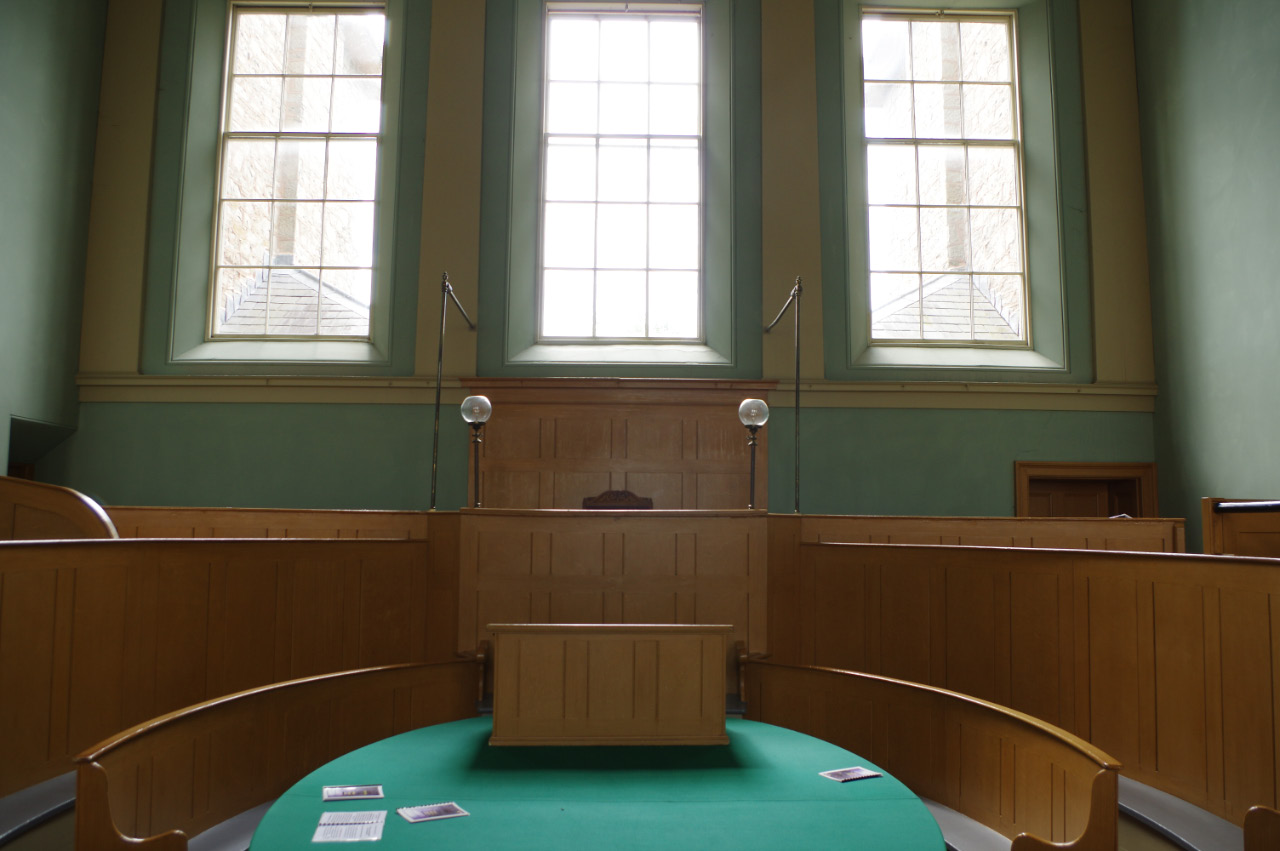
The courtroom in the shire hall

The first shire hall in Presteigne was established on the corner of the High Street in 1542. One of the most notorious cases heard in the first shire court was the trial of Mary Morgan who, in 1805, was convicted and hanged for killing her newborn child. For some time after the execution, it was claimed the father of the murdered child was Walter Wilkins the Younger, the son of the member of parliament and high sheriff of the county and the "young squire" of Maesllwch Castle. By the early 1820s, the old building was in a dilapidated condition and the justices decided to commission a new structure: the site they selected was occupied by the county prison.

The new building was designed by Edward Haycock in the neoclassical style, built in ashlar stone with a stucco finish at a cost of £5,570 and was completed in 1829. The design involved a symmetrical main frontage with nine bays facing onto Broad Street; the central section of three bays, which projected forward, featured three tall sash windows with blind panels above flanked by Tuscan order pilasters supporting a pediment. The outer sections featured ground floor loggias containing doorways in the inner bays and sash windows in the outer bays; the outer sections were fenestrated by sash windows on the first floor. Internally, the principal rooms were the courtroom, the judge's lodging and the prison cells.

The shire hall was used as accommodation for the quarter sessions and for the regular assizes but it was also used as a venue for concert performances and mess functions organised by the Royal Radnor Militia. The Lord Chief Justice of England and Wales, Lord Campbell, was impressed and described it as a "sort of paradise" when he visited the shire hall in 1855.

Following the implementation of the Local Government Act 1888, which established county councils in every county, it became necessary to establish a meeting place for the newly formed Radnorshire County Council. Early in 1889 preliminary meetings were held at the Shire Hall in Presteigne, before the new council took office on 1 April, to agree various procedural matters. One decision taken at the preliminary meetings, by 12 votes to 11, was that the county council would not meet at Presteigne but in Llandrindod Wells. Meetings were generally held at the Pump House Hotel on Spa Road East in Llandrindod Wells and the county council later built itself offices at the "County Buildings" in the High Street at Llandrindod Wells.

The shire hall in Preseigne continued to be used as a judicial facility for most of the 20th century: the last assizes were held in the building in 1970 and the last magistrates' court hearing took place in 1990. When the magistrates left the courtroom, the fittings were left just as they had been with the judge's seat, the barristers' seats, the dock for the accused, the jury benches and the witness' benches all intact. The public library, which had also been located in the building, moved to the market hall in 1996.

Following an extensive programme of refurbishment works, which involved the restoration of part of the interior of the building to recreate the judge's lodging in its original form, the shire hall was reopened by the actor, Robert Hardy, on 24 May 1997. The Royal Mail applied a special event postmark to postal items posted on the day to celebrate the occasion.

== See also ==
- Grade II* listed buildings in Powys
