= Radnorshire Arms =

Pub in Presteigne, Powys, Wales

Coordinates: 52.2747°N 3.0085°W

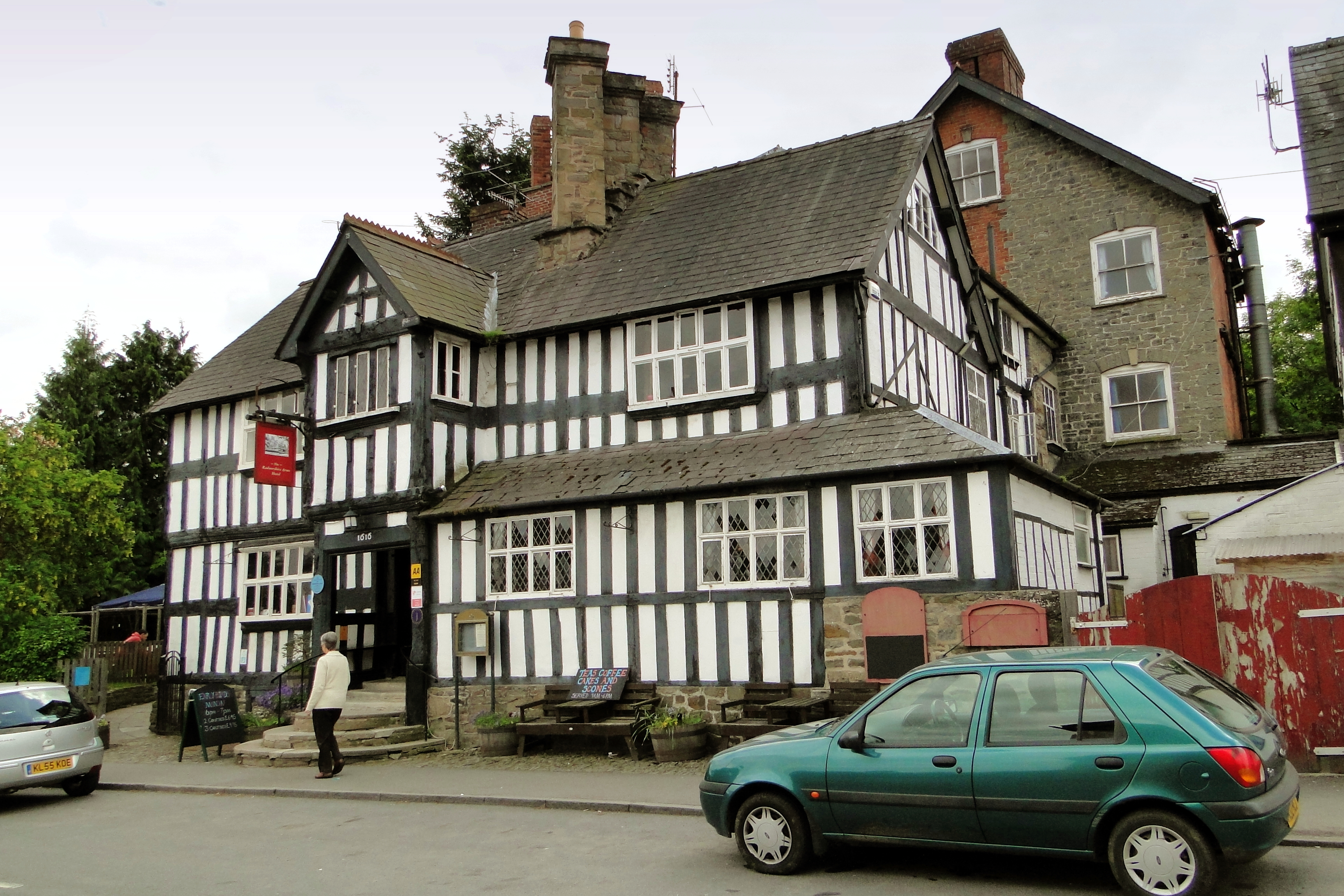
The Radnorshire Arms in 2011

The Radnorshire Arms is a well-preserved Jacobean building in the Welsh border town of Presteigne, in Powys.

The building has the date 1616 over its door but it is claimed it dates to the 16th century, once owned by Sir Christopher Hatton, a lawyer and politician, Lord Chancellor of England and rumoured lover of Queen Elizabeth I.

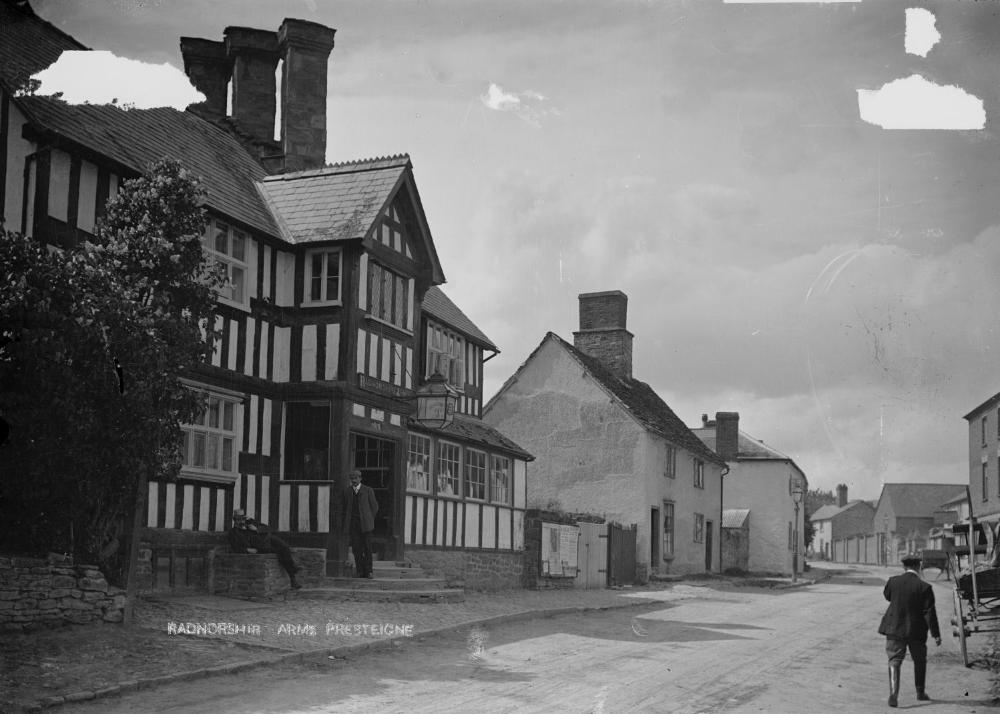
The Radnorshire Arms Presteigne, date unknown.

In 1616 it became home to a local man, John Bradshaw.

The building became an inn in 1792 and had several additions around 1875. There are also many anomalies inside the Hotel itself, caused by the large number of changes and additions to the original structure. In 1875 a secret chamber was discovered off of what is now the Resident's Lounge, which turned out to be a Priest Hole. Behind one of the panels was the diary of a Catholic Priest who had been hiding there for two years.

It is a Grade II* listed building and a hotel. It was sold out of administration to Allworks Properties in 2020, and still operates as a hotel.
