= St Cedwyn's Church, Llangedwyn =

Coordinates: 52.808722°N 3.205684°W

St Cedwyn, Llangedwyn
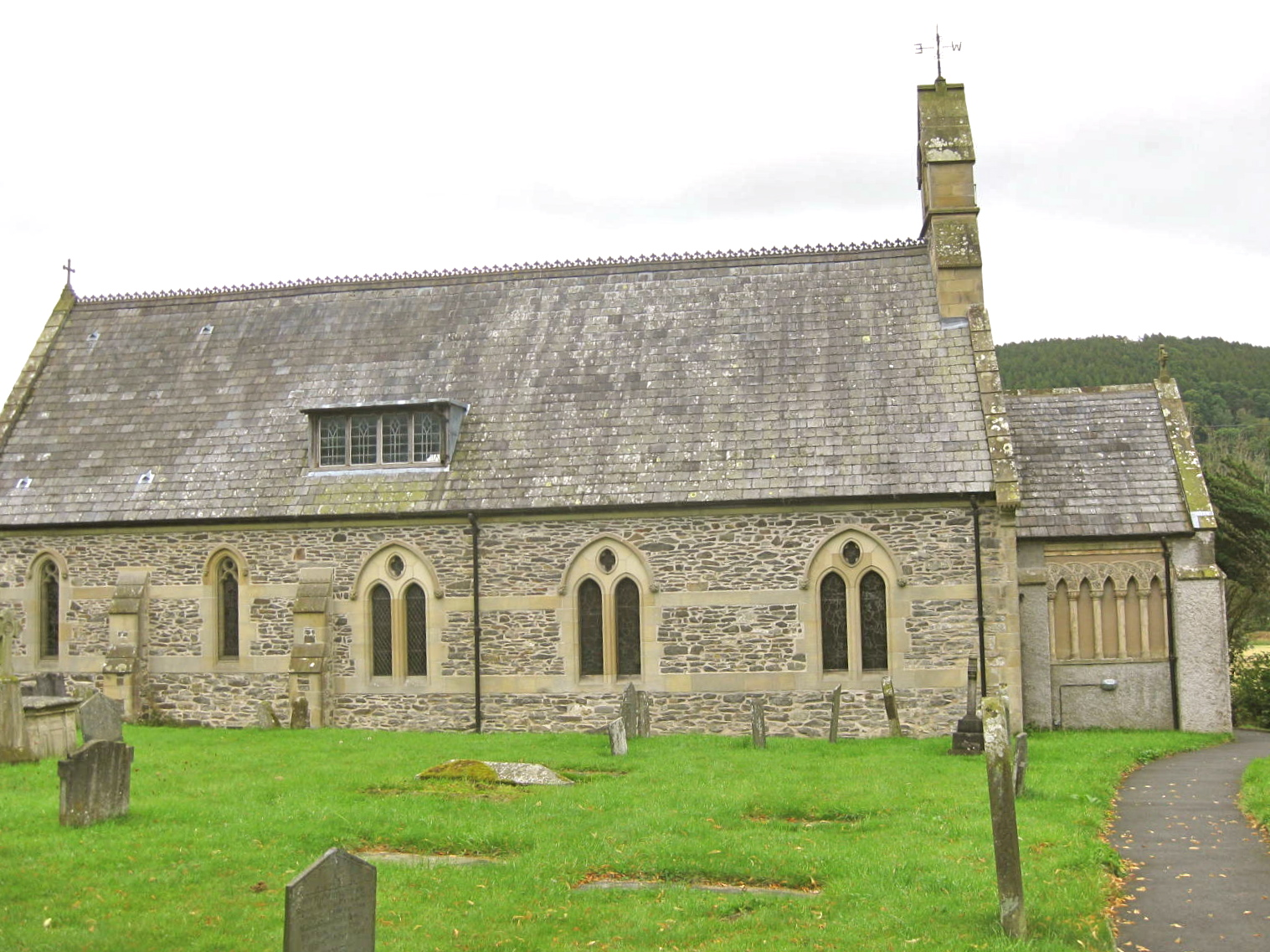
- St Cedwyn, Llangedwyn

- Location within Powys
- Location: Llangedwyn, Powys
- Country: Wales

Architecture
- Functional status: active
- Heritage designation: Grade II
- Designated: 19 June 2001
- Architect: Benjamin Ferrey
- Architectural type: Church
- Style: Medieval and Romanesque Revival

Administration
- Diocese: St.Asaph
- Parish: Llangedwyn

St Cedwyn's Church at Llangedwyn was formerly in the historic county of Denbighshire but since 1996 has been within the Montgomeryshire Shire Area of Powys, Wales. St Cedwyn's was a chapel of ease of Llanrhaeadr-ym-Mochnant. Llangedwyn is 7 miles south-west of Oswestry and to the south of the Berwyn Mountains. Saint Cedwyn may have been a son of the 5th century saint and princess Saint Madryn.

The church was extensively restored in 1869–70 by Benjamin Ferrey under the patronage of Sir Watkin Williams-Wynn of Llangedwyn Hall, but incorporates medieval masonry in its west and east walls, and also retains a Romanesque-revival porch of c.1840, very probably by Thomas Penson. Further restoration was undertaken by Herbert Luck North before 1907, including the addition of a dormer window to the roof on the north side.

== Architecture ==
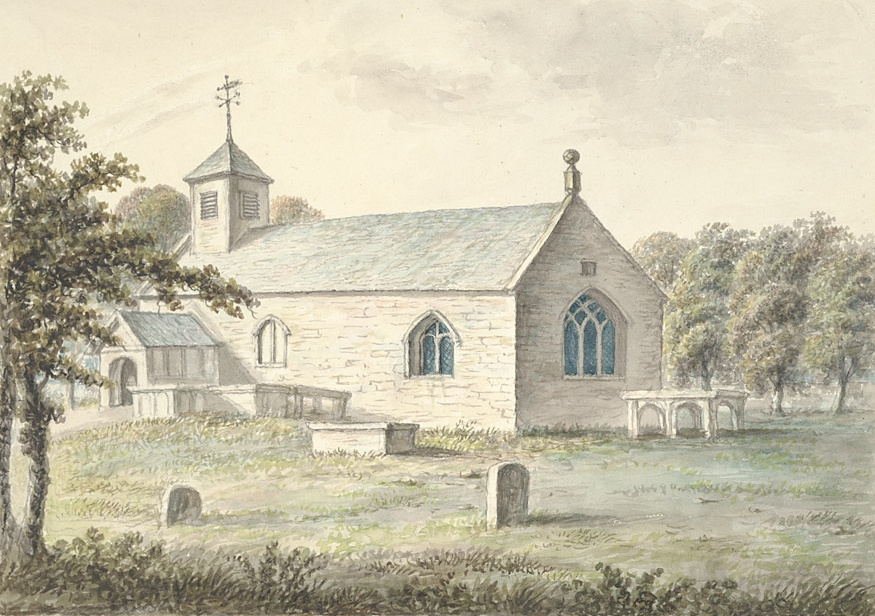
Llangedwyn church, 1795

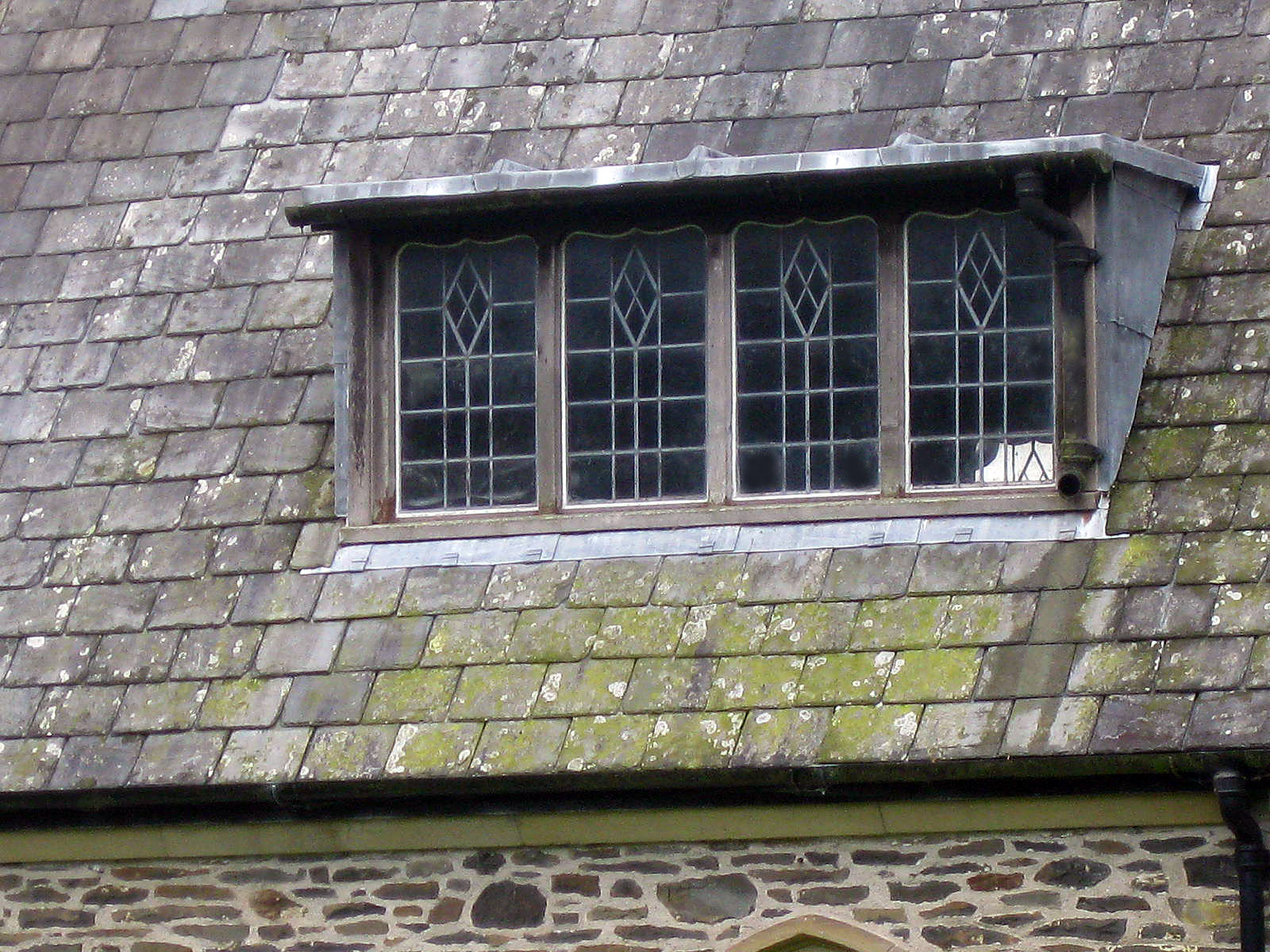
Dormer by H. L. North

There is no external differentiation between the nave and chancel. The north wall has re-used stone at lower levels; there are also two horizontal bands of dressed sandstone (probably Cefn stone) blocks along the complete length of wall. Three Gothic windows with two lights and a quatrefoil are above, in pale sandstone. There are hoodmoulds with head stops, all different. There are two buttresses with ornamented coping stones. The east or chancel window has three stepped, lancet lights under a two-centred arch and a hoodmould with foliate stops, and above this is a relieving arch of dressed freestone. On the south wall are three windows, two with paired lancet lights, and one triple. A single horizontal band of dressed freestone is comparable with the north wall of the nave. The west wall has considerable amounts of re-used stone. The vestry on the south side has square-headed doorway, and the east side has a window in a similar style.

The porch is in roughcast render on the wall faces, and pilaster buttresses at the four corners with a blind arcaded window in Romanesque revival style. The Romanesque-style doorway is in terracotta and brick, with eaves courses in the same material. The west wall has Romanesque-style windows and considerable amounts of re-used stone. The roof has a dormer window added by Herbert Luck North.

=== Romanesque-revival porch c. 1840 ===
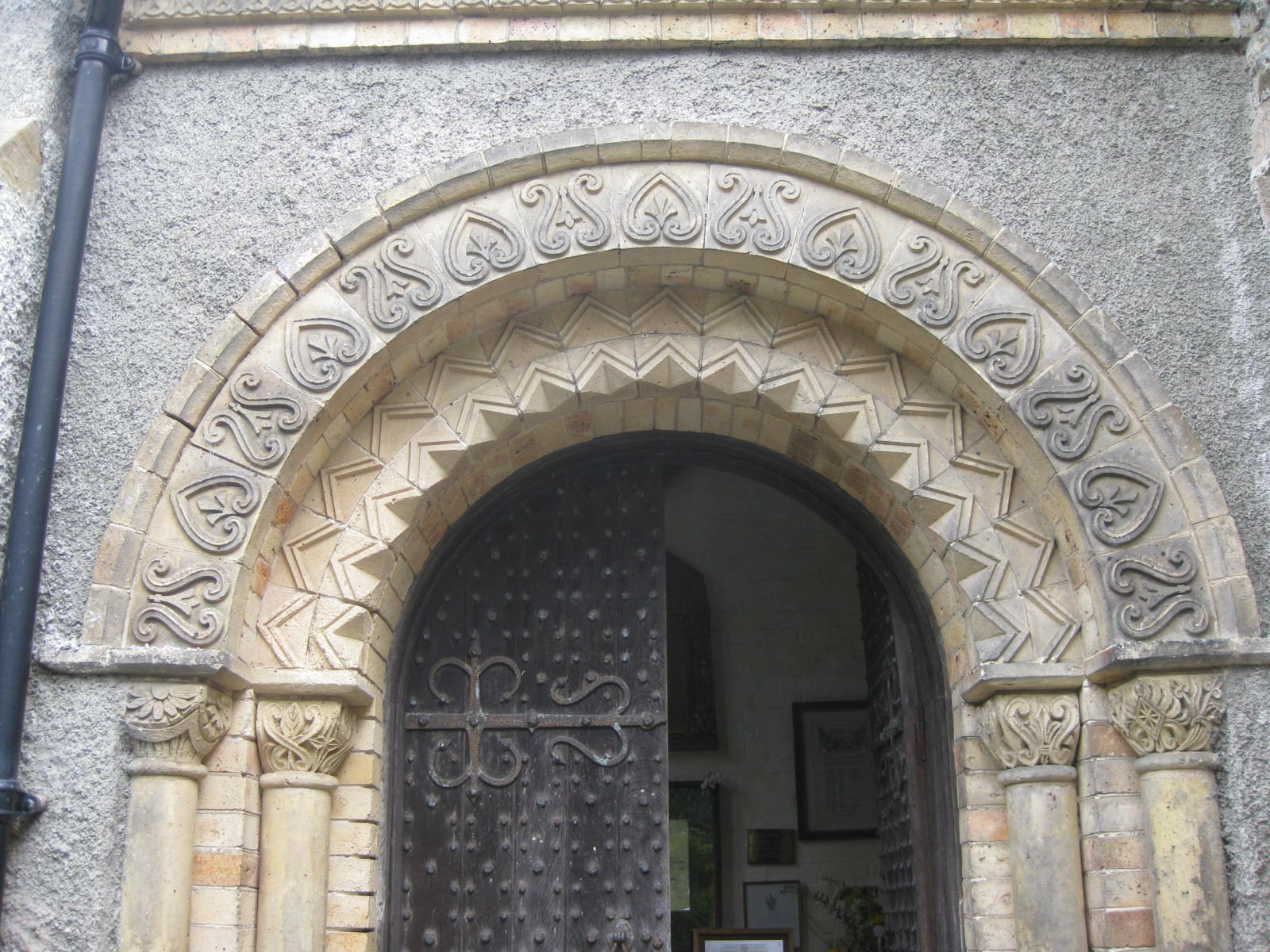
St Cedwyn, Llangedwyn 01

This is one of the most interesting features of the church. It has been attributed to Thomas Penson, an Oswestry architect, who was a pioneer in the use of terracotta in architecture. The detailing of the terracotta moldings match exactly those on the rebuilt church at Llanymynech. The porch is likely to be one of the first examples of the revival in the use of terracotta for architectural decoration. Penson's churches, which include Christ Church, Welshpool, and St David's Newtown, are built in a Norman or Romanesque style. The terracotta is likely to have been made in the nearby brickyards at Trefonen which are sited on the Oswestry coalfield. This porch is likely to be an experimental example of the use of terracotta, before Penson went on to construct larger churches using terracotta for decorative purposes.

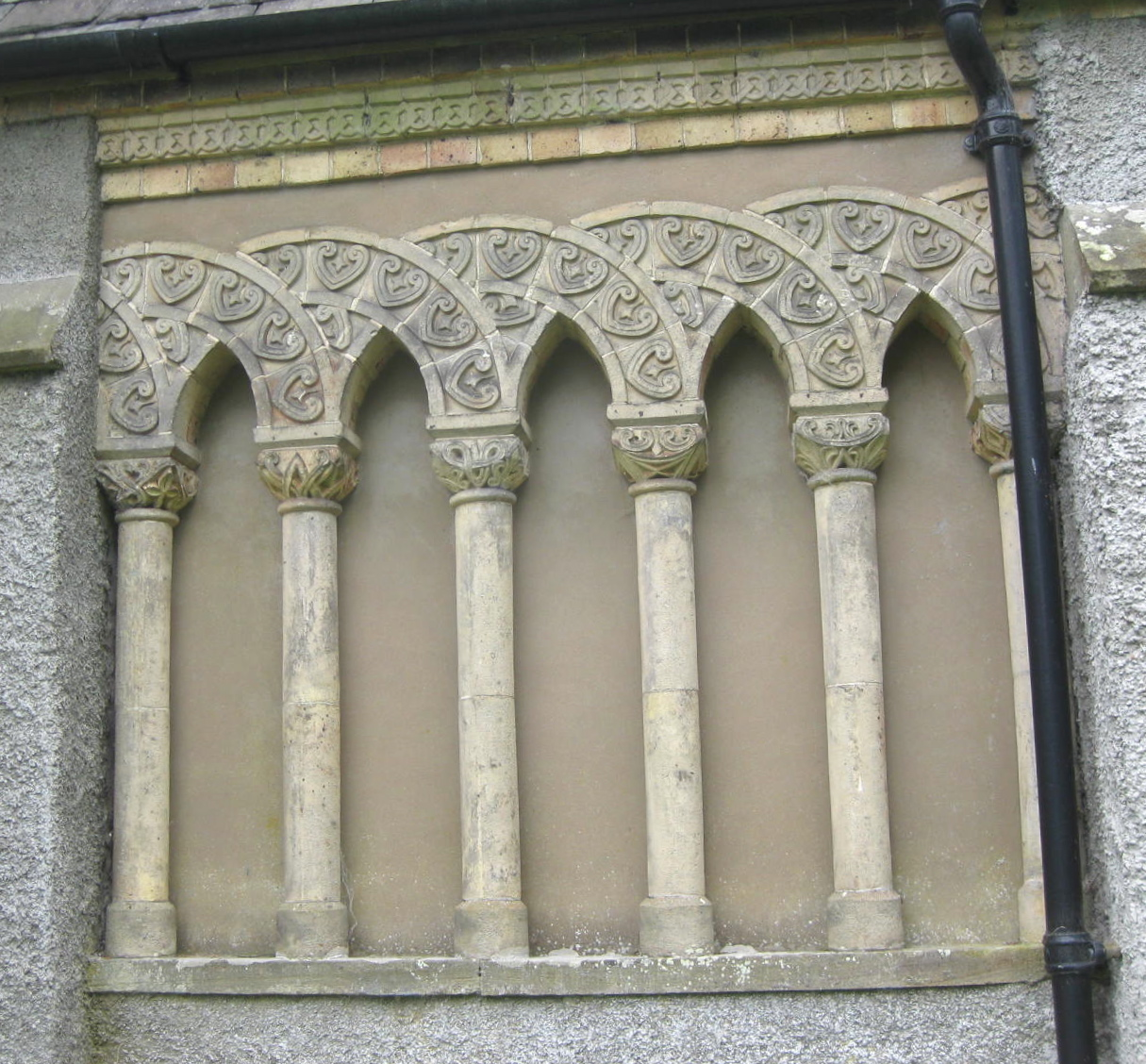
Terracotta blind Romanesque arcading

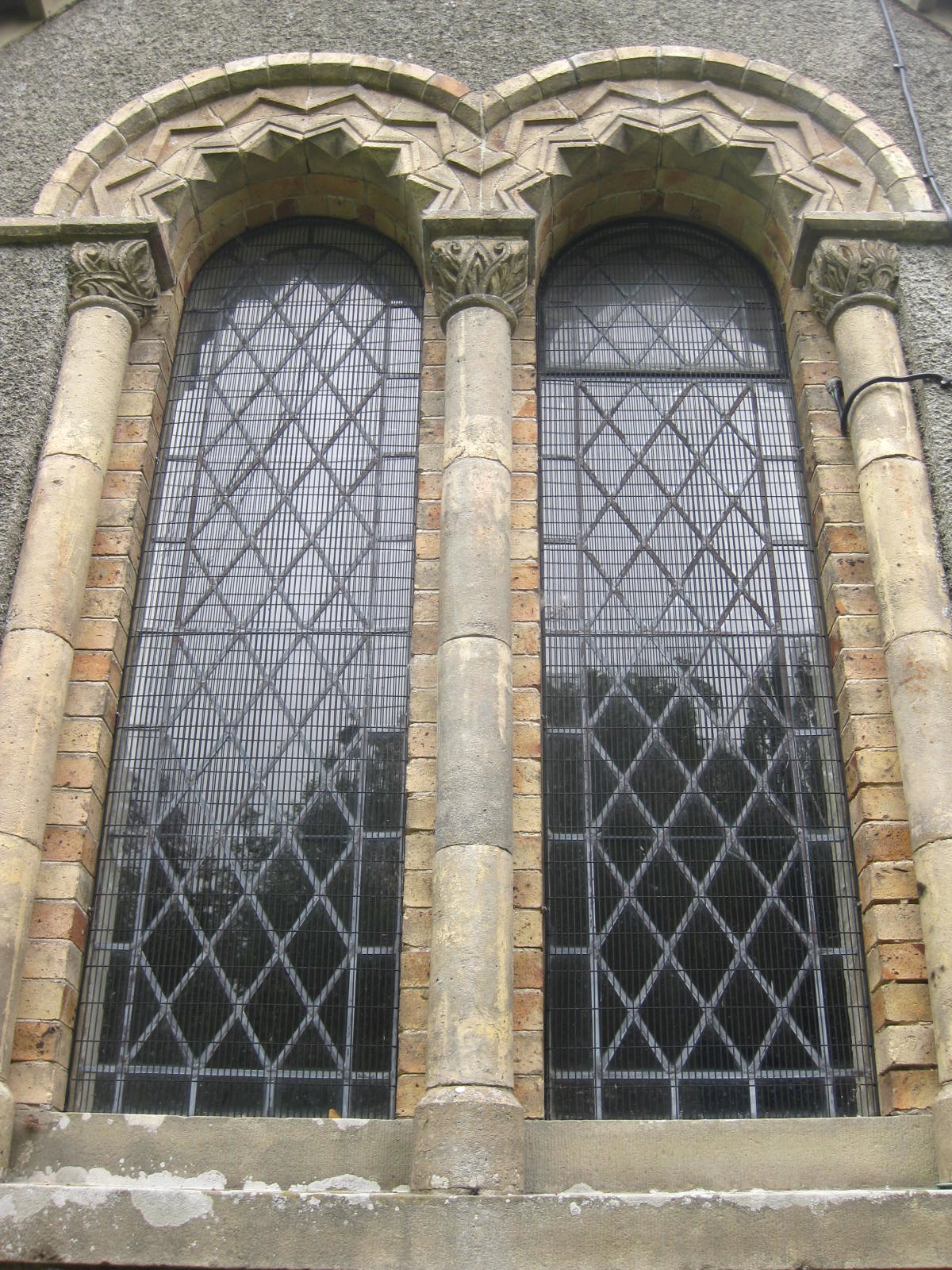
St Cedwyn, Llangedwyn

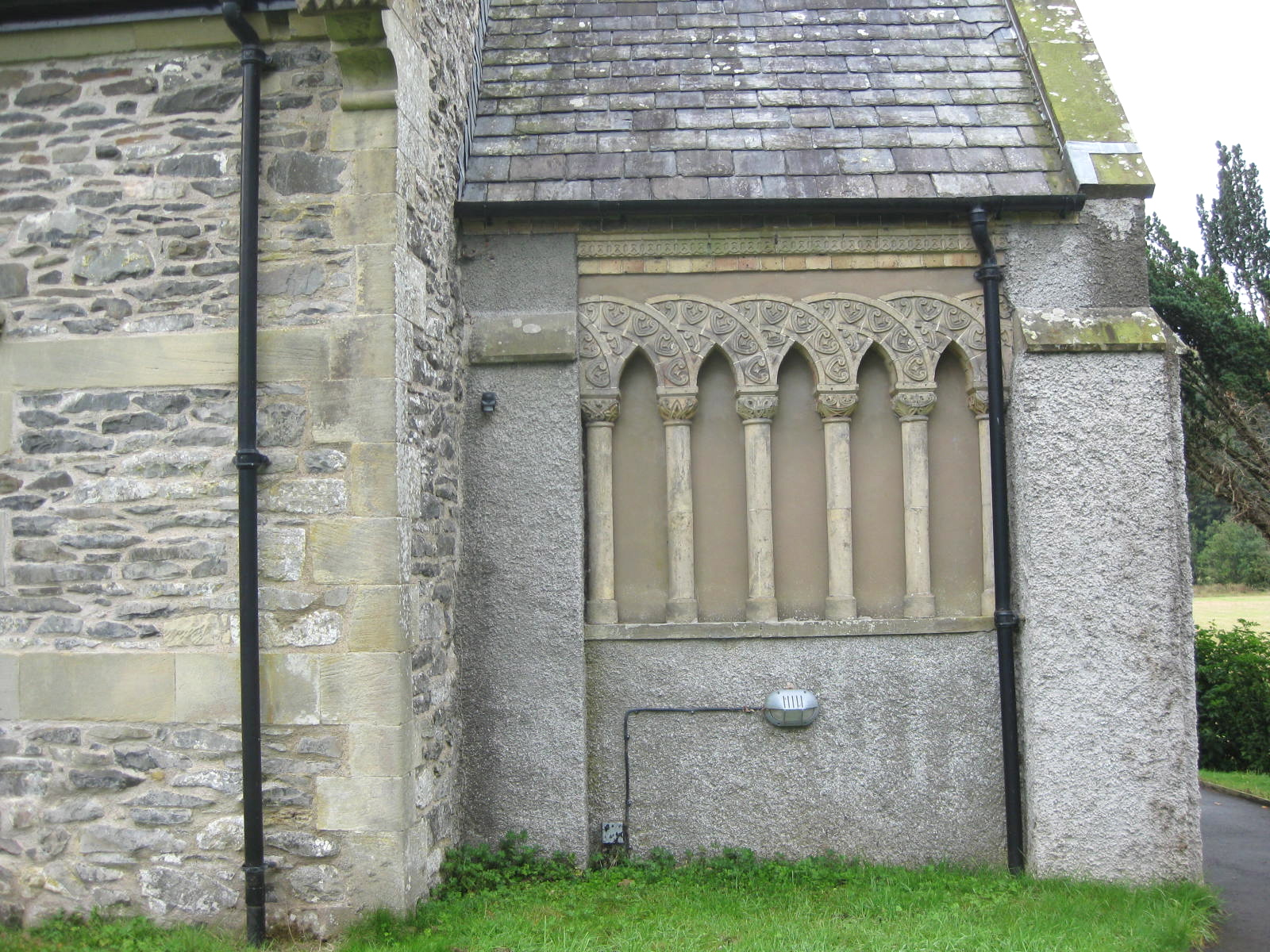
The porch from the north

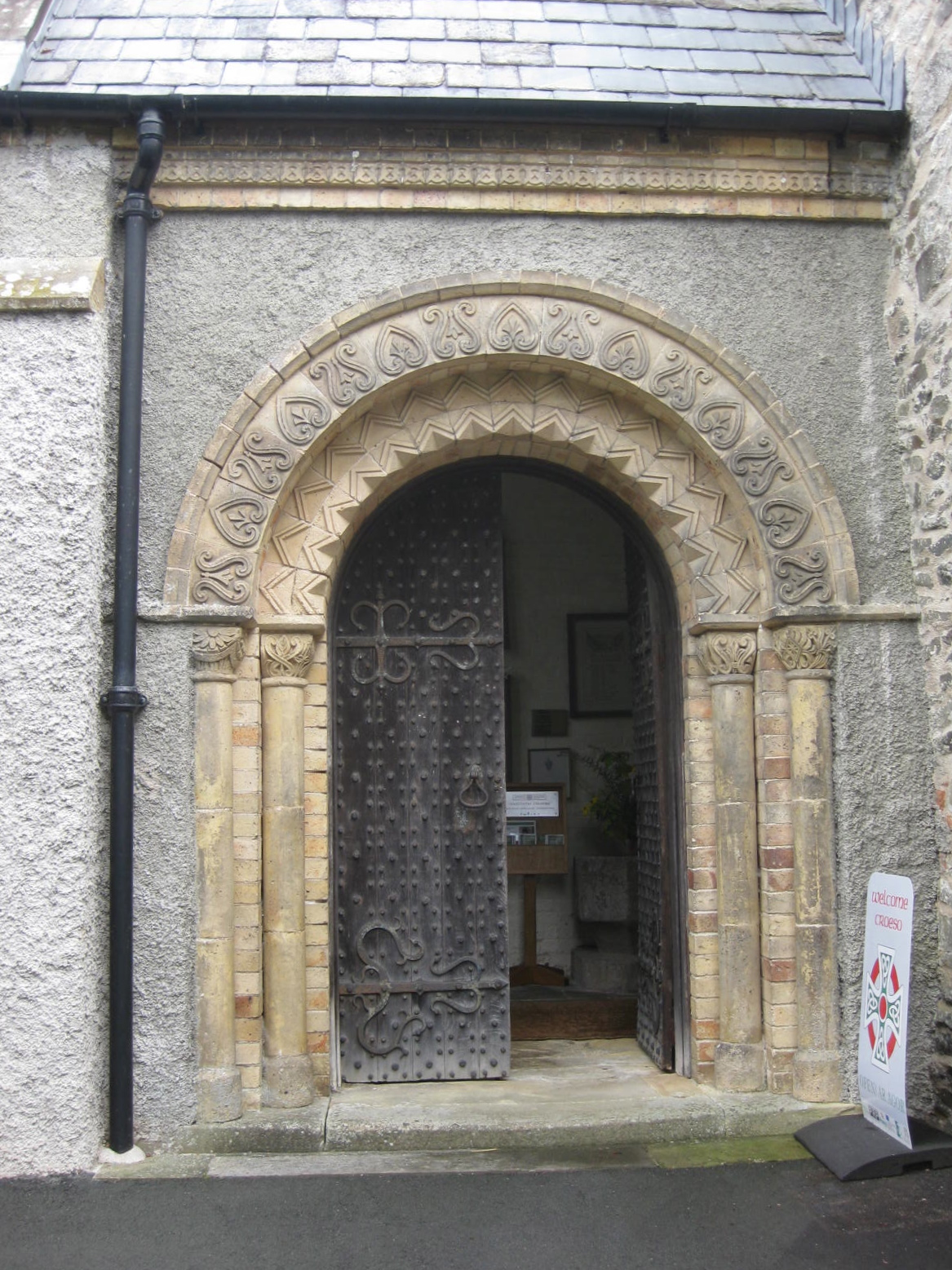
Norman revival door on porch (S)

== Interior and furnishings ==
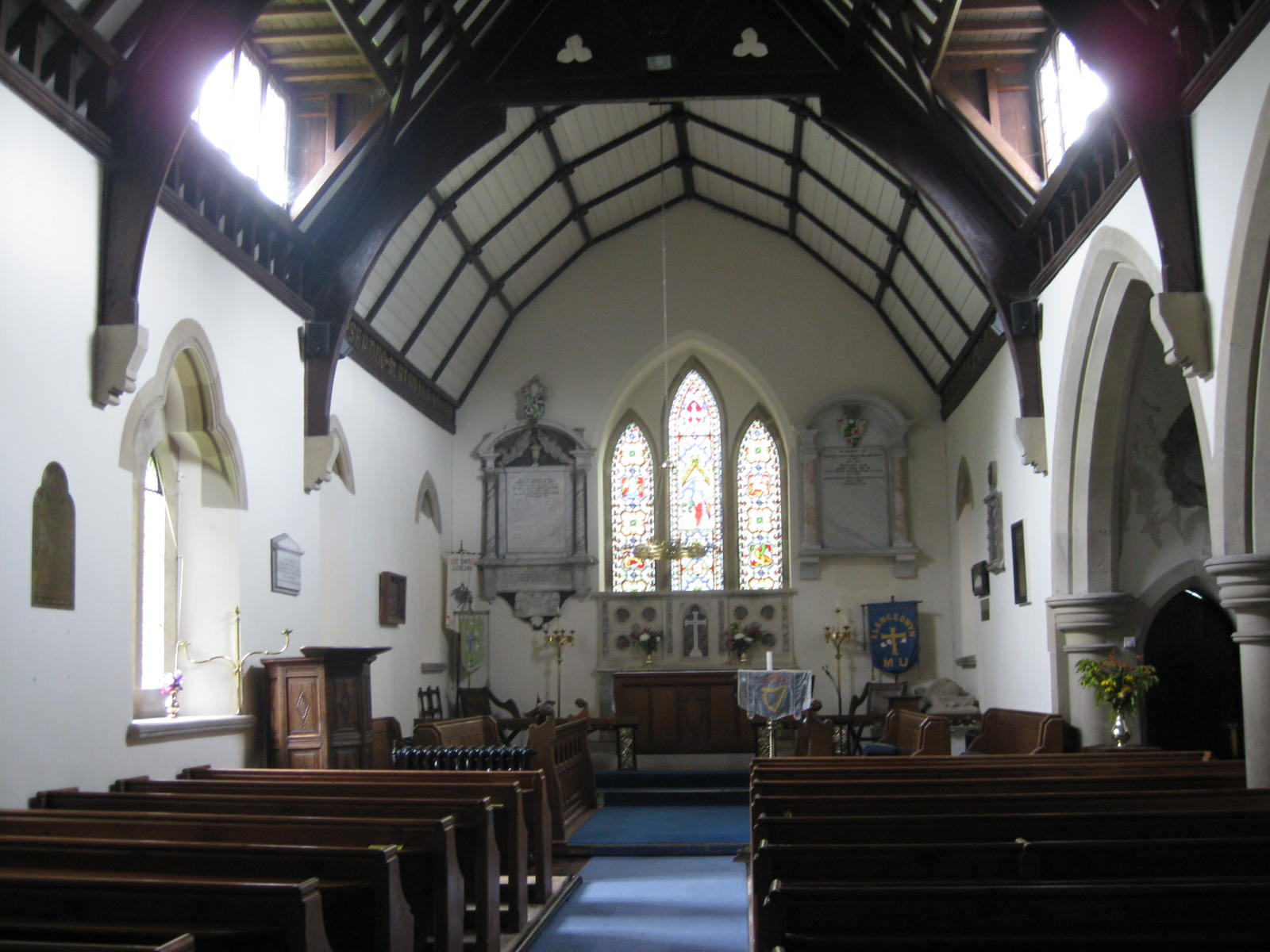
St Cedwyn, Llangedwyn

The church is entered by the west porch. This has an octagonal medieval font, a wooden poorbox dated 1741, and on the west side, a painted creed, decalogue and Lord's prayer, all in English. On the north side is a small wood and copper war memorial with Art Nouveau detailing by the Arts and Crafts designer J.H.M. Bonnor. (Bonnor died in 1916, but the memorial was carried out by his staff at Chiswick.) There are also Bonnor family tombstones to his design in the churchyard, and family memorials in the church.

The pulpit to the left is in C17 oak panelling. To the south west of the nave is an octagonal Gothic font of 1875, on clustered black supporting colonnades.

There is a large collection of monuments, including many to the Williams-Wynn and Bonnor families. To the left of the east window is a monument in figured marble with an open pediment and arms, to Edward Vaughan (1718) adopted heir of Edward Vaughan of Llwydiarth. The style of this monument has been copied in the later Williams-Wynn monument on the south side. Bonnor of Brynygwalia memorials are mostly on the west wall.

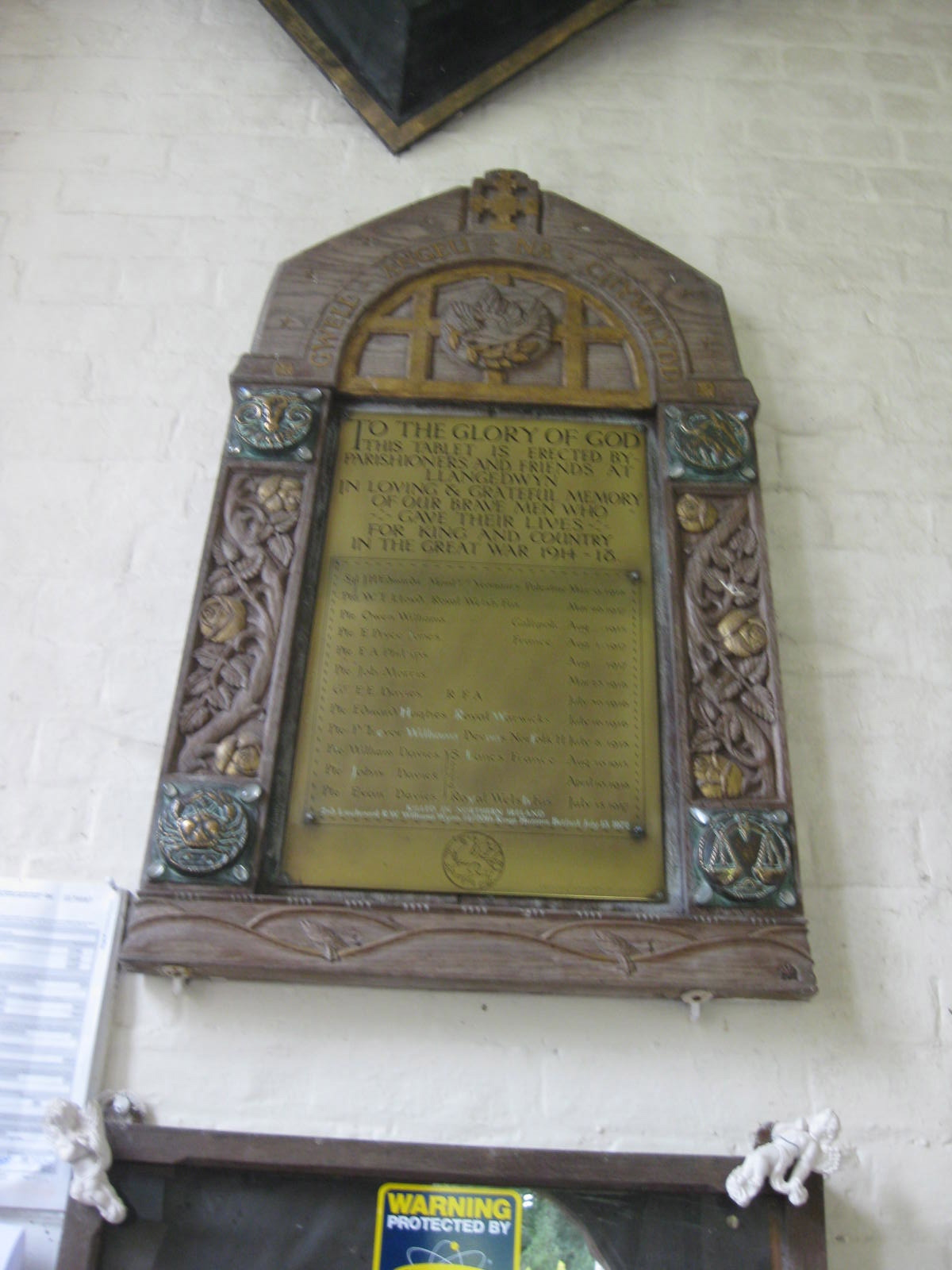
Wood and copper war memorial with Art Nouveau detailing by J.H.M. Bonnor

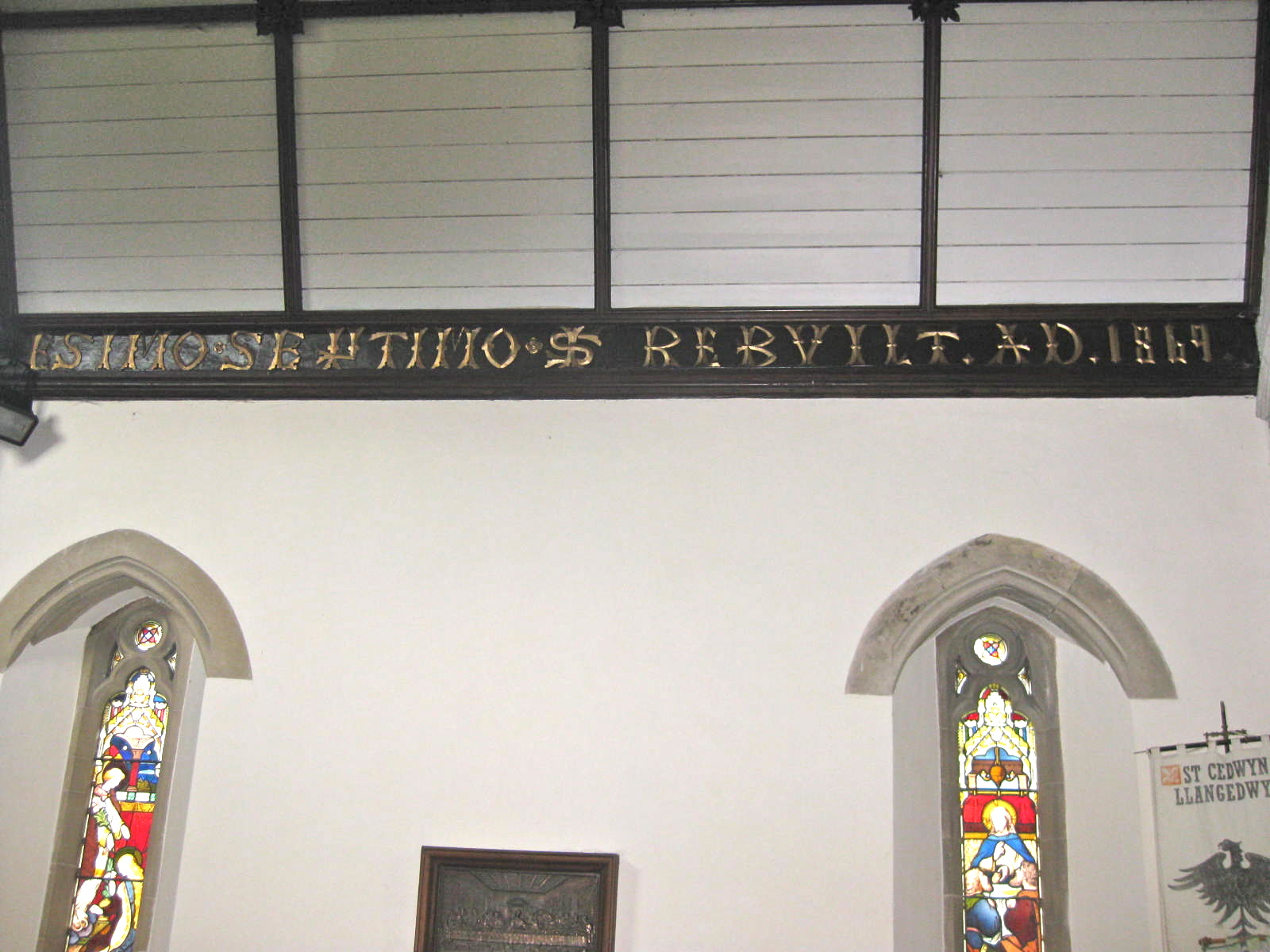
Rebuilding inscription 1869

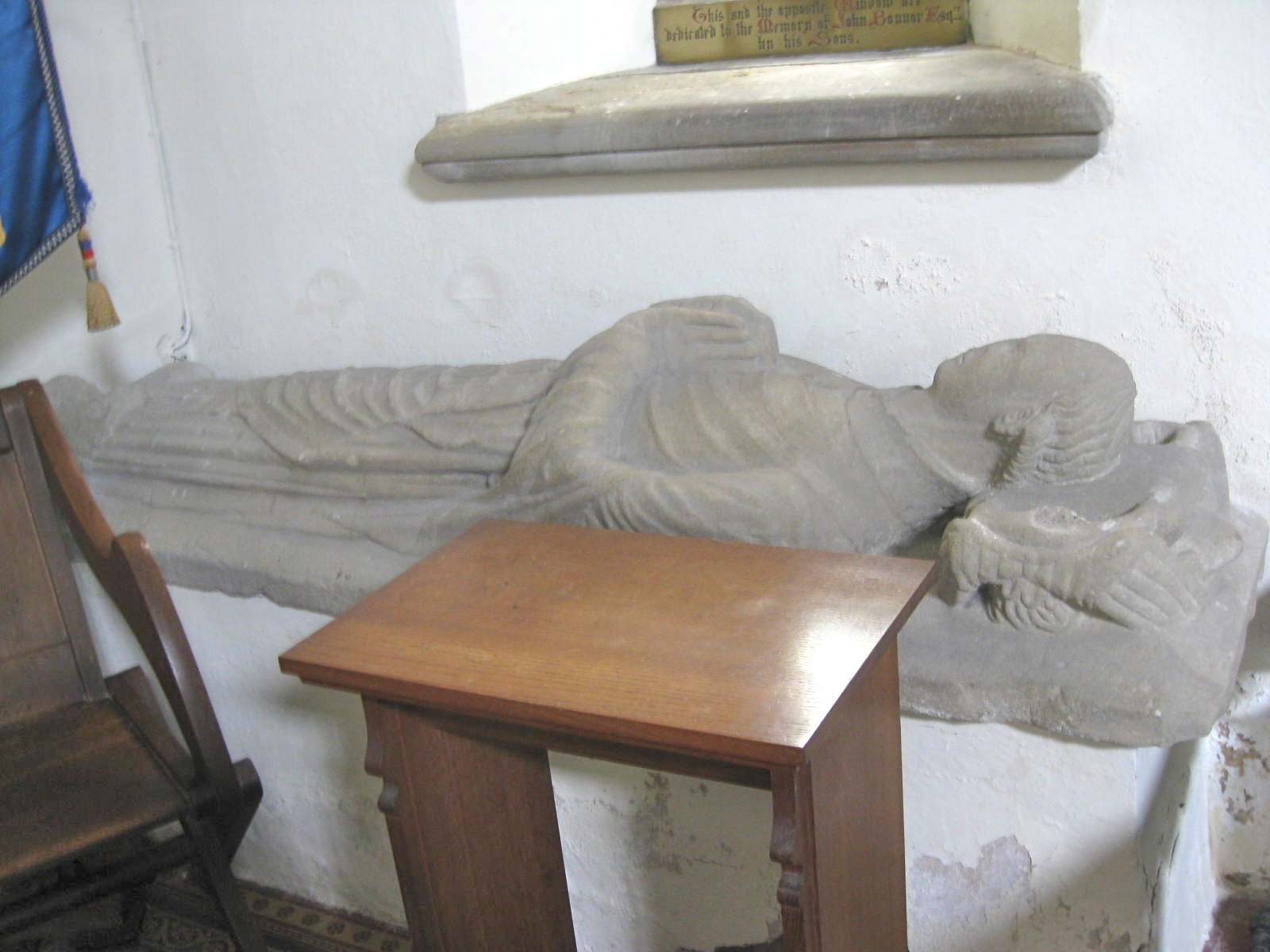
Figure of a priest, St Cedwyn, Llangedwyn

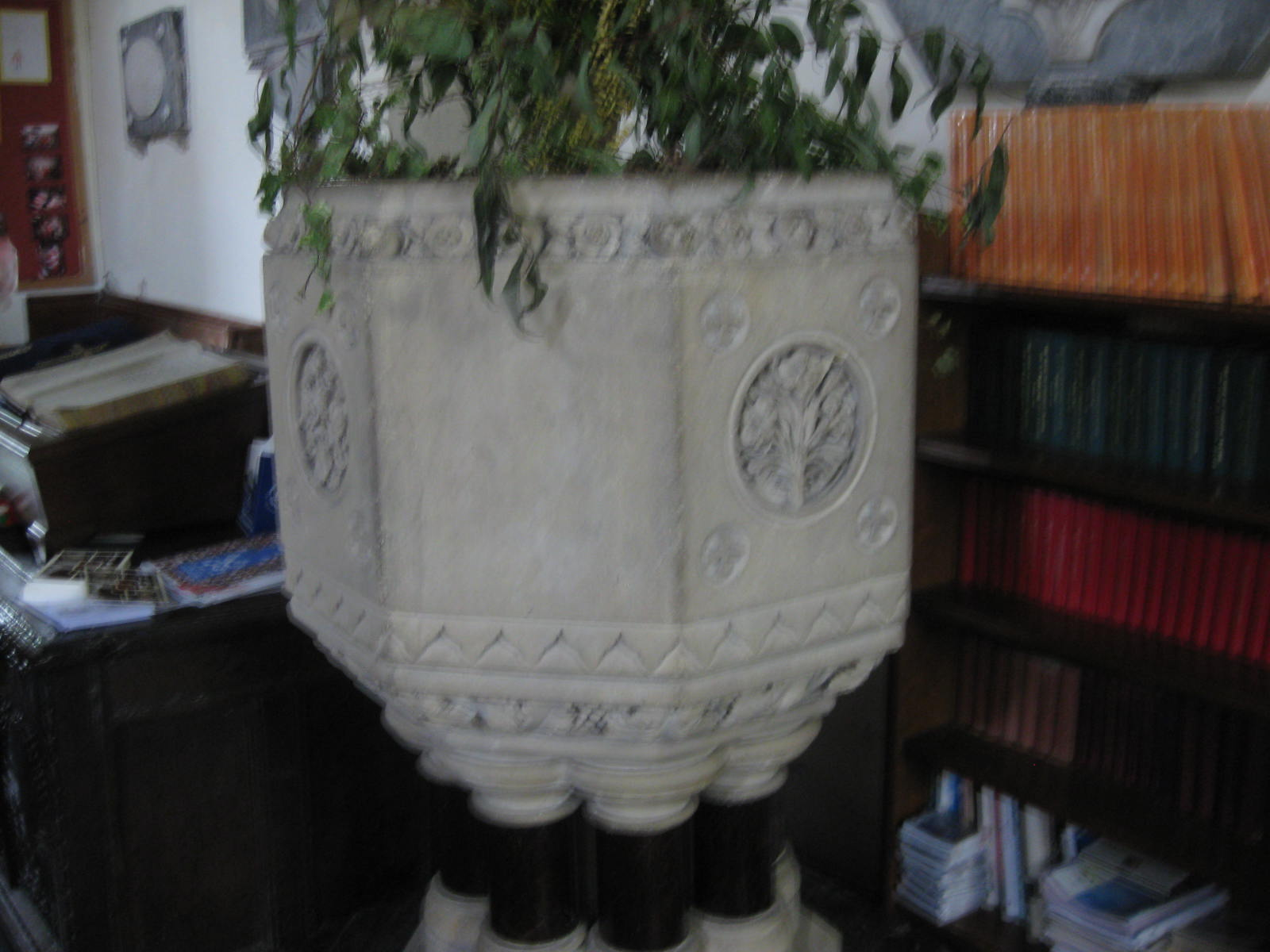
Font, St Cedwyn, Llangedwyn

== Churchyard ==
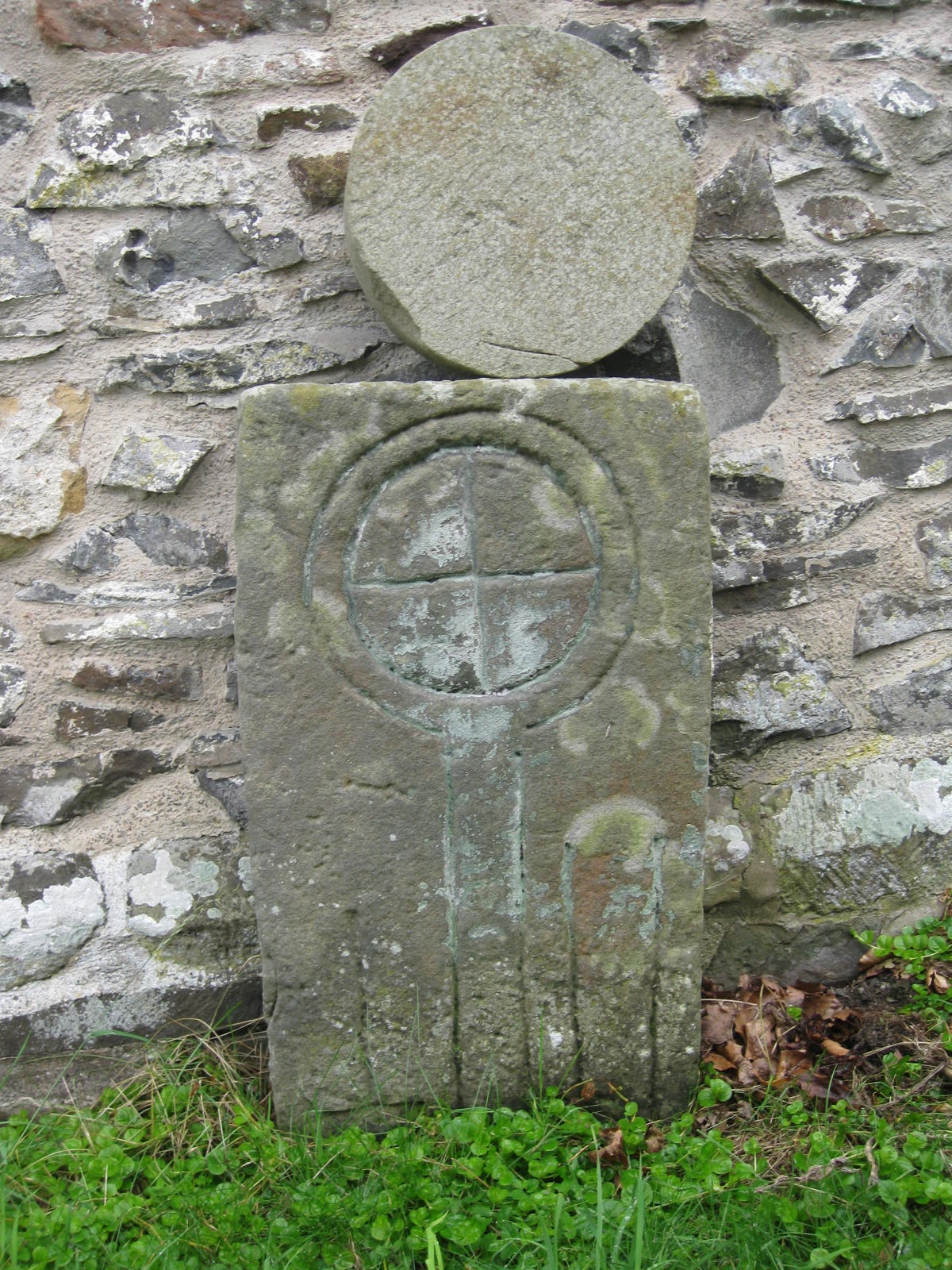
St Cedwyn, Llangedwyn 13

The churchyard at Llangedwyn is now an irregular 'butterfly' shape, due to extensions on both the south in 1870 and the east (in 1905 and later). Originally, it may have had an elliptical form but the outline has been modified through time, and the best traces of its curvilinear nature are fossilised on the south-eastern side. It occupies flat ground on the edge of the northern terrace of the River Tanat, though well back from the river, at a place where a small stream runs off the hill to the north. It is well maintained and interments continue in the north-western sector of the original churchyard. A low, spread bank, 0.3m high, surmounted by three yews, represents the former boundary on the east. To the south of the church is a natural scarp nearly 2m high which almost certainly functioned as the earliest boundary on this side. Gravestones are well spaced on the north and west, and more closely packed on the south and in the extensions. Slate memorials of the 19th century predominate, but there is a table tomb of 1734 to the east of the chancel.

The most interesting feature is the ring headed cross slab set against the east wall of the chancel. It is said to have been discovered in the walling of the old church taken down in 1869. This should be 10th century or earlier in date.

The churchyard contains two CWGC registered war graves, a soldier of the Devonshire Regiment of World War I and an officer of the 1st Royal Dragoons of World War II (Lieutenant Watkin Williams-Wynn, son of Sir Watkin Williams-Wynn, 8th Baronet).

== Literature ==
- Hubbard, E. (1986). Buildings of Wales: Clwyd. Peguin/Yale U.P. pp. 214–215
- Stratton, M. (1993) The Terracotta Revival : Building Innovation and the Image of the Industrial City in Britain and North America. London : Gollancz.
- Thomas, D. R. 1908 (2nd ed.) The History of the Diocese of St Asaph, Caxton Press, Oswestry, vol. 2 p. 235
- Royal Commission on Historic Monuments, Inventory of Denbighshire (1914) p. 113
