= St Andrew's Church, Presteigne =

Church in Wales

Coordinates: 52.2990°N 3.0212°W

St Andrew's Church
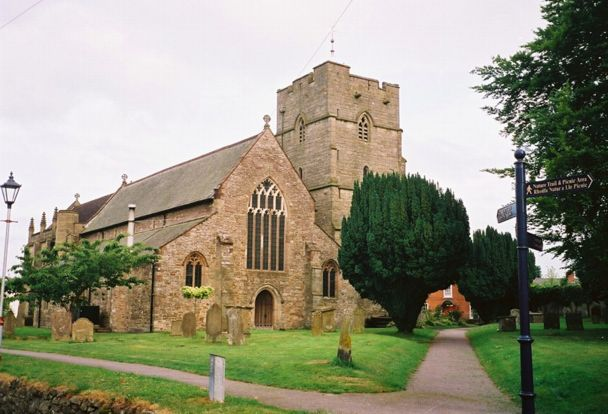
- St Andrew's Church
- Denomination: Church of England
- Previous denomination: Roman Catholic

History
- Status: active

Architecture
- Heritage designation: Grade I
- Designated: 1950

Administration
- Province: Canterbury
- Diocese: Hereford
- Archdeaconry: Hereford
- Deanery: Kington and Weobley
- Parish: Presteigne with Discoed

St Andrew's Church is a Church of England parish church in Presteigne, Powys, Wales. It was first constructed in the 9th century by the Anglo-Saxons and retains elements of the original Anglo-Saxon church within a Norman renovation and later Victorian restoration. It is a Grade I listed building.

== History ==
In the 9th century, Anglo-Saxons built St Andrew's Church next to the River Lugg. Following the Norman conquest of Wales, when the majority of the church was damaged during an attack by the Welsh, the Normans constructed a church incorporating the Anglo-Saxon north aisle. In the 12th–13th centuries the church was enlarged and a bell tower was constructed with a new nave and south aisle constructed by canons from Wigmore Abbey.

In 1889-91, a restoration of the church was undertaken by John Loughborough Pearson. A memorial to Joseph Baker, for whom Mount Baker in Washington state, United States is named, was installed in the chapel of the church as he had retired to Presteigne. A 13th-century coffin lid, possibly from a member of the Mortimer Family, is also installed in the north side of the church. It was granted Grade I listing in 1950.

== Tapestry ==
In 1737, St Andrew's Church was given a Flemish tapestry from 1510 illustrating Jesus' triumphal entry into Jerusalem. Upon receipt it was first used as an altar cloth for the church's altar up until the 19th century. In the 19th century, it was then framed and hung on the north wall of the church. It is one of only two pre-English Reformation tapestries to be hung on display in parish churches in the United Kingdom.

== Referendum ==
In 1914, the Welsh Church Act 1914 was passed by the Parliament of the United Kingdom to disestablish the Church in Wales from the Church of England. Because the enactment of the disestablishment was delayed by the Suspensory Act 1914, it was not until 1915 that seventeen parishes (including Presteigne with Discoed) were balloted by the Welsh Church Commissioners in a referendum as to whether they wanted to remain part of the Church of England or join the Church in Wales. These parishes were given the choice because their parish boundaries crossed the geographical borders between England and Wales. St Andrew's parishioners voted 595–289 to remain part of the Church of England despite the church being located in Wales. As a result of the decision in the referendum, St Andrew's Church remained a part of the Diocese of Hereford.
