= Powys Digital History Project =

Digital history project in Wales

The Powys Digital History Project is a digital history project in Wales that focuses on recording local history through both digital archival materials and interpretation that is accessible for a wide range of users. The project covers the history of communities in the mid-Welsh county of Powys.
