= Llangedwyn Church in Wales Primary School =

Coordinates: 52.80941°N 3.21174°W

Llangedwyn Church In Wales Primary School
- Llangedwyn yr Eglwys yng Nghymru Ysgol Gynradd
- Llanfyllin; Wales

Information
- School type: LEA, Primary
- Motto: Mighty oaks from little acorns grow
- Religious affiliation: Christian
- Established: 1825; 201 years ago
- Locale: Tanat Valley

Llangedwyn Church In Wales Primary School (known as Llangedwyn C in W Primary School) was a primary school in the Tanat Valley in Mid Wales on the border with Shropshire. It served the village of Llangedwyn and the surrounding community in Powys and Shropshire from opening in 1825. It had strong links with, and was situated near, St. Cedwyn's Church in Llangedwyn.

It was closed on 31 August 2024, with children transferred to Llanfechain Church in Wales School.

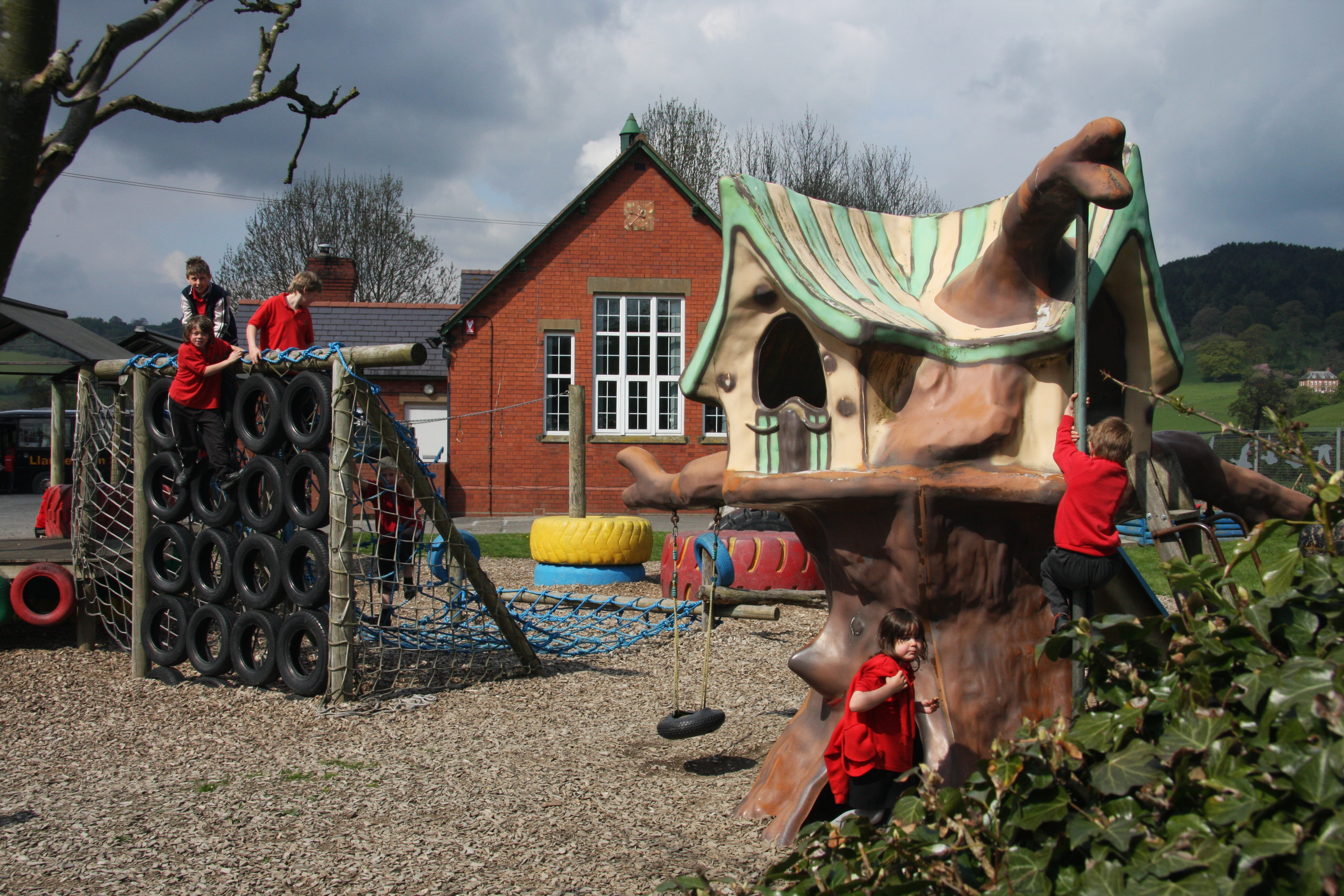
Llangedwyn C in W Primary School

== About the school ==
The school has two large classrooms, and a hall used for school and church assemblies, indoor activities, and meals. There is a large tarmac playground, and a well-equipped, brightly coloured adventure playground. A large field adjoins the school, for football, sports days, and various outdoor activities during the summer.

According to the school's latest ESTYN report, "Llangedwyn is a good school with strong community values. The headteacher and all staff work effectively to provide an interesting and wide range of experiences for the pupils." The school has strong links with the community. A book was published to celebrate the 100th anniversary of Llangedwyn's building.

Llangedwyn School is in the County of Powys in Mid Wales in the catchment area of Llanfyllin, and appears in The Good Schools Guide
