= Presteigne =

Town in Powys, Wales

Presteigne: Welsh: Llanandras
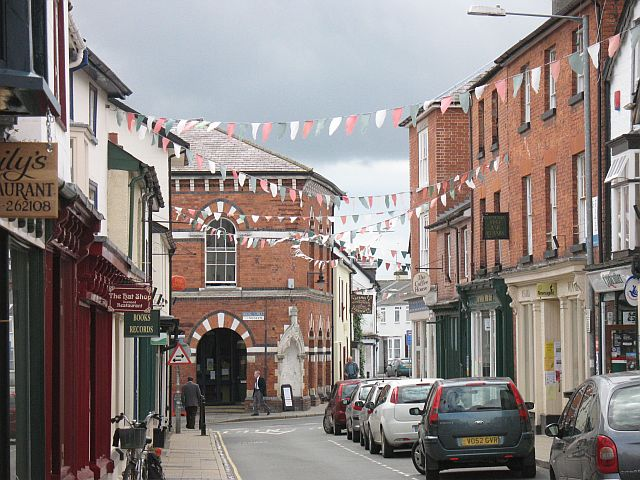
- Presteigne High Street

- Location within Powys
- Population: 2,710 (2011)
- OS grid reference: SO315645
- Community: Presteigne
- Principal area: Powys
- Preserved county: Powys
- Country: Wales
- Sovereign state: United Kingdom
- Post town: PRESTEIGNE
- Postcode district: LD8
- Dialling code: 01544
- Police: Dyfed-Powys
- Fire: Mid and West Wales
- Ambulance: Welsh
- UK Parliament: Brecon, Radnor and Cwm Tawe
- Senedd Cymru – Welsh Parliament: Brecon & Radnorshire
- List of places UK Wales Powys 52.27436°N 3.00536°W Community map: Map of the community

Presteigne (/prɛsˈtiːn/; Welsh: Llanandras: the church of St Andrew) is a town and community on the south bank of the River Lugg in Powys, Wales. The town is located on the England–Wales border, which surrounds it to the north, east and south. Nearby towns are Kington, Herefordshire to the south and Knighton to the north, and surrounding villages include Norton (within the community) and Stapleton. The community has a population of 2,710; the built-up area had a population of 2,056.

Presteigne was formerly the county town of the historic county of Radnorshire. Despite being in Wales, it is part of the diocese of Hereford in the Church of England.

== History ==
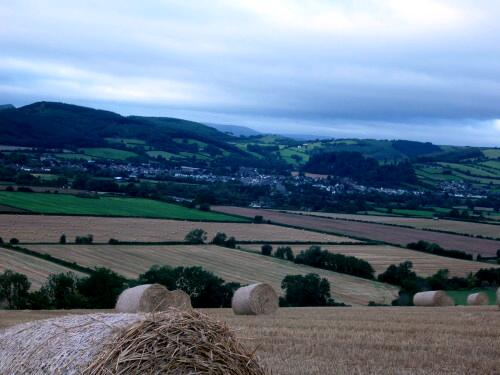
Presteigne viewed from Stapleton Hill (August 2007)

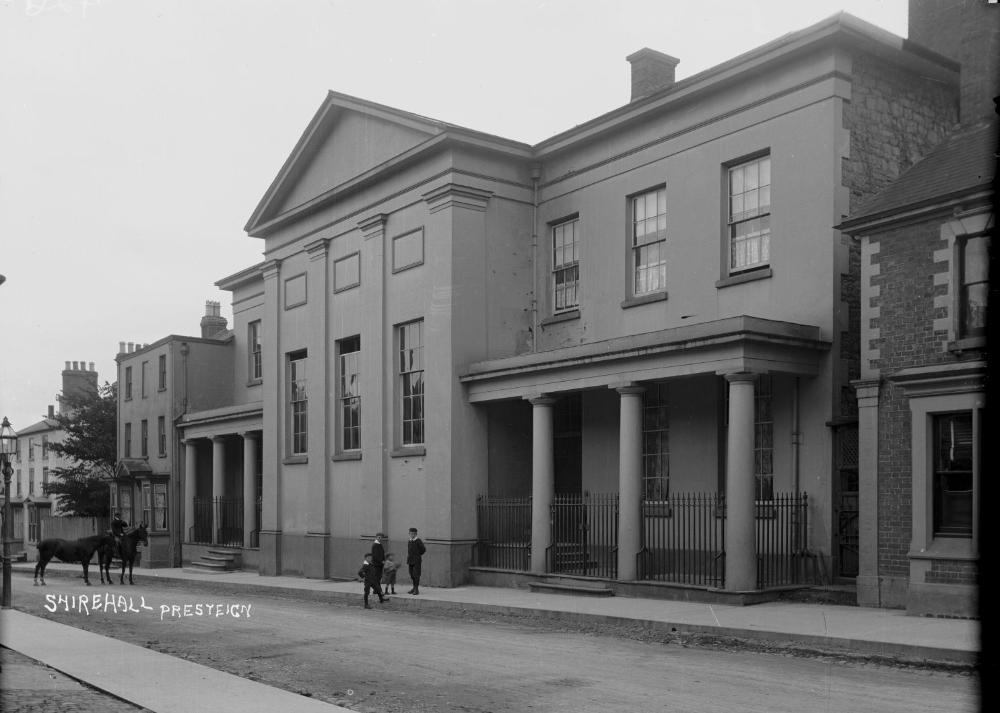
The Shire Hall, Presteigne; photographed by Percy Benzie Abery c. 1910s

The town probably began as a small settlement around a minster church dedicated to St Andrew and at the time of the Domesday Book it formed part of the manor of Humet.

By the mid-12th century, it was known as 'Presthemede' or 'the bordering meadow of the priests'. A century later, it passed into the control of the Mortimers, powerful Marcher lords, and on their fall passed into the hands of the Crown.

At the end of the 13th century, the majority of the town's inhabitants, mainly English, enjoyed some prosperity but the Black Death and the Glyndŵr rebellion had destroyed this and by the end of the 15th century, the now largely Welsh, population lived in a struggling village. A significant victory in their rebellion was won by the forces of Owain Glyndŵr nearby at the Battle of Bryn Glas in 1402.

The development of a thriving cloth industry in the Tudor period brought short-lived prosperity, ended by three new epidemics of plague in three successive generations. Thereafter it became a market town and, until the later 16th century, a centre for processing locally grown barley into malt.

By the Acts of Union, Presteigne - at first jointly with New Radnor - became the county town of Radnorshire and its administrative and judicial centre, housing the county gaol and the Shire Hall.

By the end of the 19th century, its newer and larger neighbour, Llandrindod Wells, had usurped the role of administrative centre, but Presteigne remained the venue for the Assizes until these were abolished in 1971.

After a period of stagnation in the first half of the 20th century, the town has developed a diverse manufacturing base and has begun to exploit its tourism potential while its environment and the development of its social, cultural and leisure facilities have helped to attract people to settle.

Presteigne attracted national attention in 2004 for an unsuccessful campaign by its Mayor, Councillor Peggy Fraser-Scott, to enforce a curfew on the town's youth.

=== John Beddoes ===
Henry Edward's Old English Customs: Curious Requests and Charities mentions the bell ringer appointed by John Beddoes in 1565 to ring a "day bell" at 8am, and a curfew at 8pm. Beddoes specified that in the event of the custom being abandoned for more than a year, (except in plagues) the funds set aside for this position would revert to his heirs.

Beddoes, a wool merchant, gave his name to Presteigne's secondary school – John Beddoes School – which he established in 1565 and endowed with land.

=== Second World War ===
During the 1930s, the Ministry of Labour opened a work camp for long-term unemployed young men. Many of the inmates came from the crisis-hit coal mining, steel and heavy industry communities of South Wales. Presteigne was one of a number of Instructional Centres created by the Ministry, and it also had a satellite camp in Shobdon, Herefordshire. By 1938, the Ministry had 38 Instructional Centres across Britain. The camp was situated in Slough Lane near Hill Farm and is now a small private housing site. Land owned by Capt Lewis RN, of Clatterbrune House, was used to hold first Italian and then German POW's during the Second World War and is now the home of Presteigne St Andrews Football Club.

== Art and culture ==
The town has become a local cultural centre. It hosts two indigenous festivals. First, the Sheep Music Festival dedicated to contemporary music; and the Presteigne Festival of Music and the Arts which casts a broader cultural net. It attracts composers of the calibre of Ian Wilson. The town has an award-winning museum - The Judge's Lodging - created from the disused Shire Hall and re-opened by Robert Hardy in 1997. The Church of St Andrew permanently houses a 16th-century Flemish tapestry. Presteigne was also host to the world's first competitive electric bicycle race.

== Media ==
Since the town is close to the England–Wales border, local news and television programmes are provided by BBC West Midlands and ITV Central that broadcast from Birmingham. Television signals are received from the Ridge Hill TV transmitter and the local relay transmitter. However, BBC Cymru Wales and ITV Cymru Wales can also be received through satellite television such as Freesat and Sky. Local radio stations are BBC Radio Wales, BBC Radio Cymru, Heart North and Mid Wales and Sunshine Radio.The town is served by the local newspapers, County Times and Brecon & Radnor Express

== Notable buildings ==
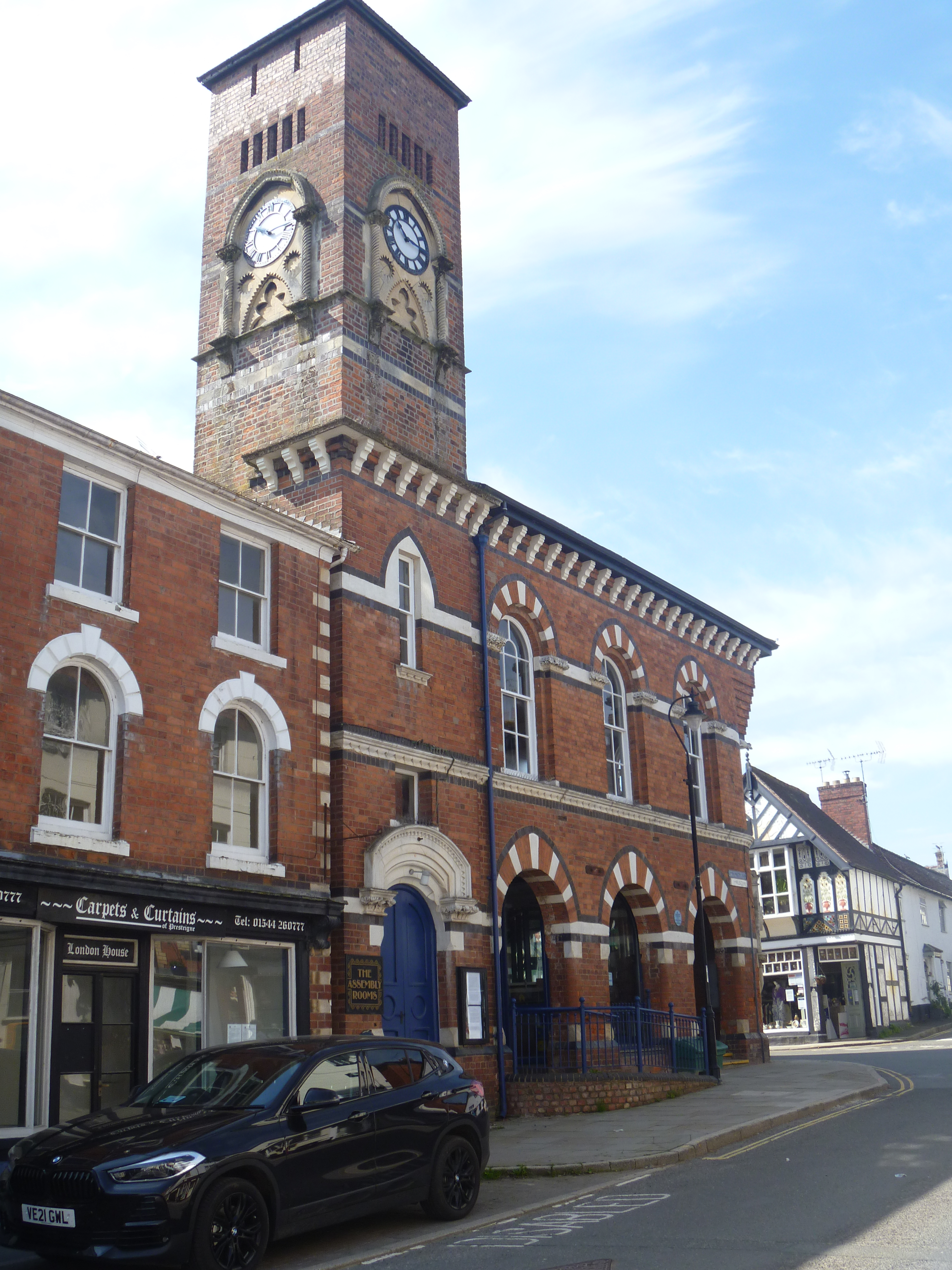
The Assembly Rooms

- St Andrew's parish church, parts of which are Anglo-Saxon
- The Jacobean Radnorshire Arms hotel
- The Judge's Lodging, decorated in mid-Victorian style, now a museum.
- The Assembly Rooms, which were completed in 1865.

== Public transport ==
The Kington & Presteigne Railway opened as an extension of the Leominster and Kington Railway on 9 September 1875. The railway line commenced at Titley Junction, passed through Leen farm, to Staunton on Arrow, in front of the Rodd farm via Corton into Presteigne. By 1929 it was possible to join one of the three steam trains a day - each way - and make the six-hour journey to London. The passenger service on this line ended in 1951, but a freight service continued to run every other day until the line was finally closed for good in 1961. Presteign railway station was within the Great Western Railway.

Knighton is the nearest railway station, serviced by Transport for Wales. Bus services run (Monday to Saturday) to Kington with connections from there to Hereford, and buses in the opposite direction to Knighton. A single daily service from Ludlow to Builth Wells is also operated via Presteigne.

== Notable people ==
- Richard Lucas (ca.1648–1715), clergyman and writer of devotional works.
- Sir Standish Hartstonge, 2nd Baronet (ca.1672– 1751), politician, lived in Presteigne in the 1690s.
- Price Hartstonge (1692–1744), an Anglo-Irish politician, MP for Charleville from 1727–44.
- Sir Harford Jones-Brydges, 1st Baronet, (1764–1847), British diplomat and author.
- Peter Puget (1765–1822), Royal Navy officer, explored Puget Sound on the Pacific coast of the USA.
- Joseph Baker (1767–1817), Royal Navy officer, mapped the Pacific Northwest coast of America.
- Mary Morgan (1788–1805), a young servant, murdered her baby child; hanged.
- William Phillips (1822–1905), botanist and antiquary.
- Deborah Moggach (born 1948), an English novelist and screenwriter lives in the town.
- Christopher Salmon (born 1978), politician, Dyfed-Powys Police and Crime Commissioner. 2012/2016

=== Sport ===
- Francis Evelyn (1859–1910), cricketer and High Sheriff of Radnorshire, born in the town.
- Fred Griffiths (1873–1917) Welsh international football goalkeeper.
- Robert Weale (born 1963), lawn and indoor bowls player, Commonwealth Games gold-medallist.
- Jim Williams (born 1984), a Welsh professional darts player, plays in PDC events, lives in the town.
- Chaz Davies (born 1987), a former motorcycle racer and 2011 World Supersport champion.

== Bibliography ==
- Field, J. Learning Through Labour: Training, unemployment and the state, 1890-1939, University of Leeds, 1992, ISBN 0-900960-48-5 (work camps)
- Parker, K. A History of Presteigne (1977)
- Parker, K. Radnorshire from Civil War to Restoration: A Study of the County and Its Environs 1640-60 in a Regional Setting (2000)
