= Llanrhaeadr-ym-Mochnant =

Village in Wales

- Village and community
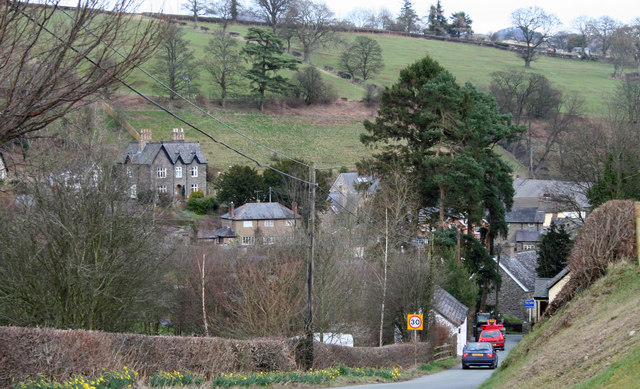
- Llanrhaeadr-ym-Mochnant skyline

- Location within Powys
- Population: 1,197 (2021 census)
- OS grid reference: SJ123262
- Principal area: Powys
- Preserved county: Powys
- Country: Wales
- Sovereign state: United Kingdom
- Post town: Oswestry
- Postcode district: SY10
- Dialling code: 01691
- Police: Dyfed-Powys
- Fire: Mid and West Wales
- Ambulance: Welsh
- UK Parliament: Montgomeryshire and Glyndŵr
- Senedd Cymru – Welsh Parliament: Montgomeryshire
- List of places UK Wales Powys 52°49′30″N 3°18′00″W Community map: Map of the community

Llanrhaeadr-ym-Mochnant (Welsh pronunciation) is a village and community in Powys, Wales. It is about 9 miles (14 km) west of Oswestry and 12 miles (19 km) south of Llangollen, on the B4580 road. It lies on the river Rhaeadr near the foothills of the Berwyn range. The community includes the hamlet of Llanarmon Mynydd Mawr and the Pistyll Rhaeadr waterfall.

== History ==
Llanrhaeadr-ym-Mochnant (historically also spelt 'Llanrhaiadr-yn-Mochnant') was an important site in the ancient commote (or cantref; sources disagree) of Mochnant, as indicated by the ym-Mochnant in its name (translates to "in Mochnant").

== Geography ==
The village is in the valley of the River Rhaeadr under the upland Berwyn range. The summit of Cadair Berwyn lies on the northern boundary of the community, while the hill Moel Hen-fache (515 metres (1,690 ft)) is a mile north of the village.

At the top end of the valley is the Pistyll Rhaeadr waterfall, one of the traditional Seven Wonders of Wales, known for its natural arch.

== Governance ==
The village falls in the electoral ward of Llanrhaeadr-ym-Mochnant/Llansilin. The ward population at the 2011 census was 2,295.

Llanrhaeadr-ym-Mochnant was an ancient parish which straddled the county boundary between Denbighshire and Montgomeryshire. The county boundary followed the river through the village. The parish church was in the Denbighshire part of the parish, north of the river. The division between the two counties reflected the partition of the ancient commote in the 12th century.

Under the Local Government Act 1894, parishes were no longer allowed to straddle county boundaries. The parish was therefore split into two civil parishes, one in Denbighshire and one in Montgomeryshire; both parishes were called Llanrhaiadr-yn-Mochnant (later changed to Llanrhaeadr-ym-Mochnant). The divide continued following the local government reorganisation in 1974, with the former Denbighshire parish becoming a community in Clwyd and the former Montgomeryshire parish becoming a community in Powys. The northern community was transferred to Powys in 1996. Even then, the two remained separate communities within Powys until 2008, when they were reunited into a single community.

== Demographics ==
At the 2021 census, the community had a population of 1,197 people in 540 households. Of these, 445 lived in the "built-up area" of the village.

Census population of Llanrhaeadr-ym-Mochnant community
Census	Population	Female	Male	Households	Source
2001	1,223	602	621	493	
2011	1,195	580	615	522	
2021	1,197	591	606	540	

In the 2011 census, the population was 1,195, with 408 in the village itself.

== Landmarks ==
Capel Seion is in the village. It is a Methodist chapel rebuilt in the early 20th century in Arts and Crafts style.

=== Parish church ===
The Norman church of St Dogfan is a grade II* listed building, restored between 1879 and 1882, but with parts dating back to the 13th century. There is a gravestone with a Celtic cross possibly commemorating Cwgan son of Ethelstan, a Welsh prince of the 11th century.

The parish is best known for its former vicar, William Morgan (1545–10 September 1604), who first translated the whole Bible into Welsh in the 1580s and later became a bishop of Llandaff and of St Asaph. Gwallter Mechain (1761–1849), the bard, was the vicar from 1837 until his death in 1849. Griffith Hartwell Jones (1859–1944), a Welsh academic and Anglican clergyman, was born in the village.

St Dogfan was a son of Brychan Brycheiniog and a Welsh prince in the 5th century. A clas dedicated to him was founded on the site of the present church. The holy well of the saint is on the farm of Gwernfeifod in Cwm-ffynnon.

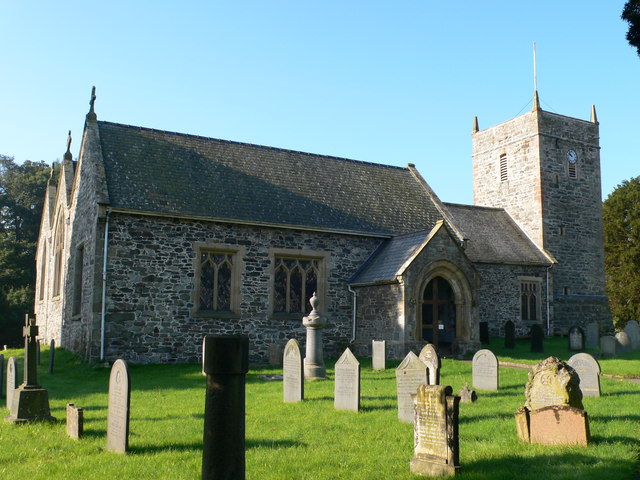
St Dogfan's church

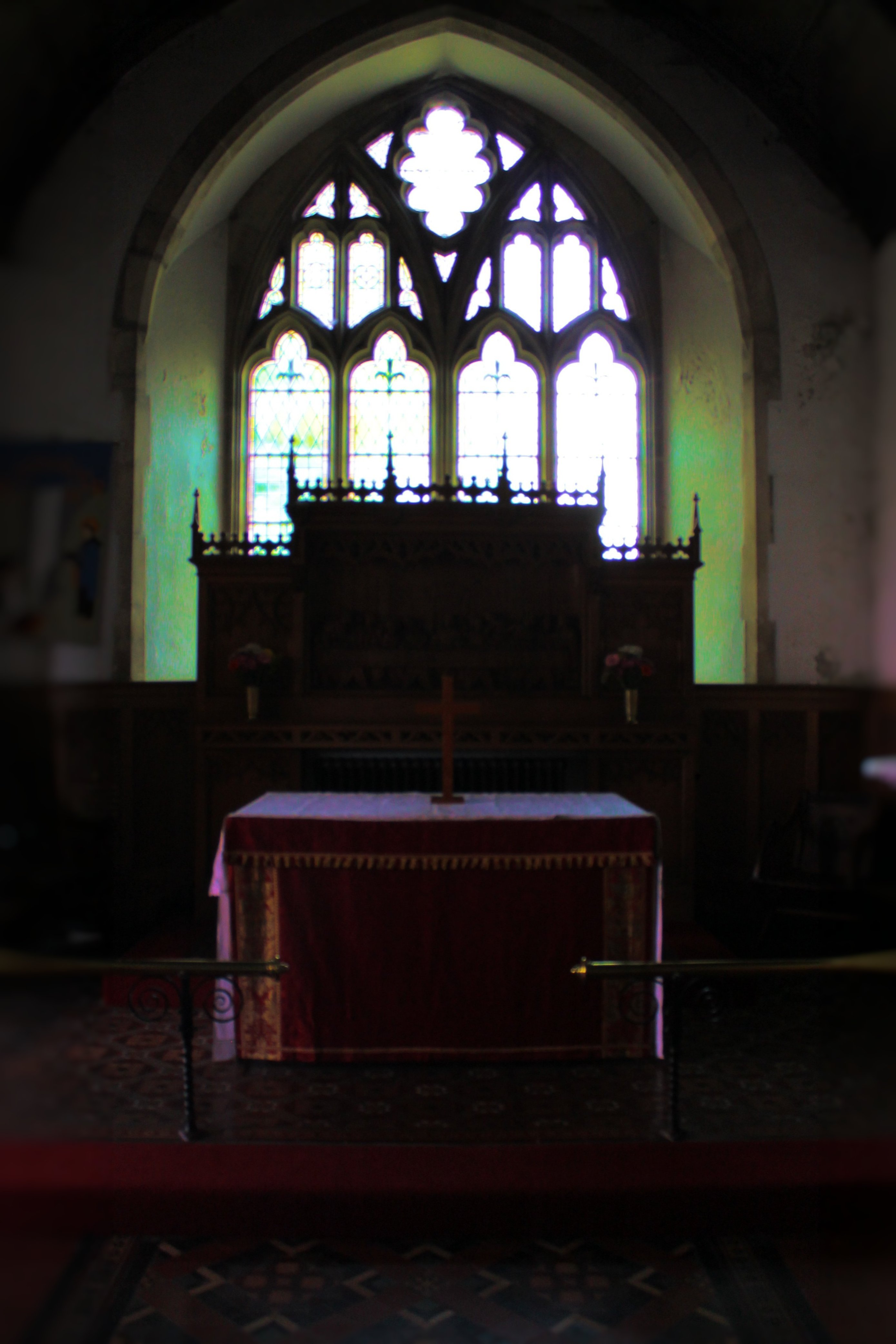
Church of St Dogfan Altar

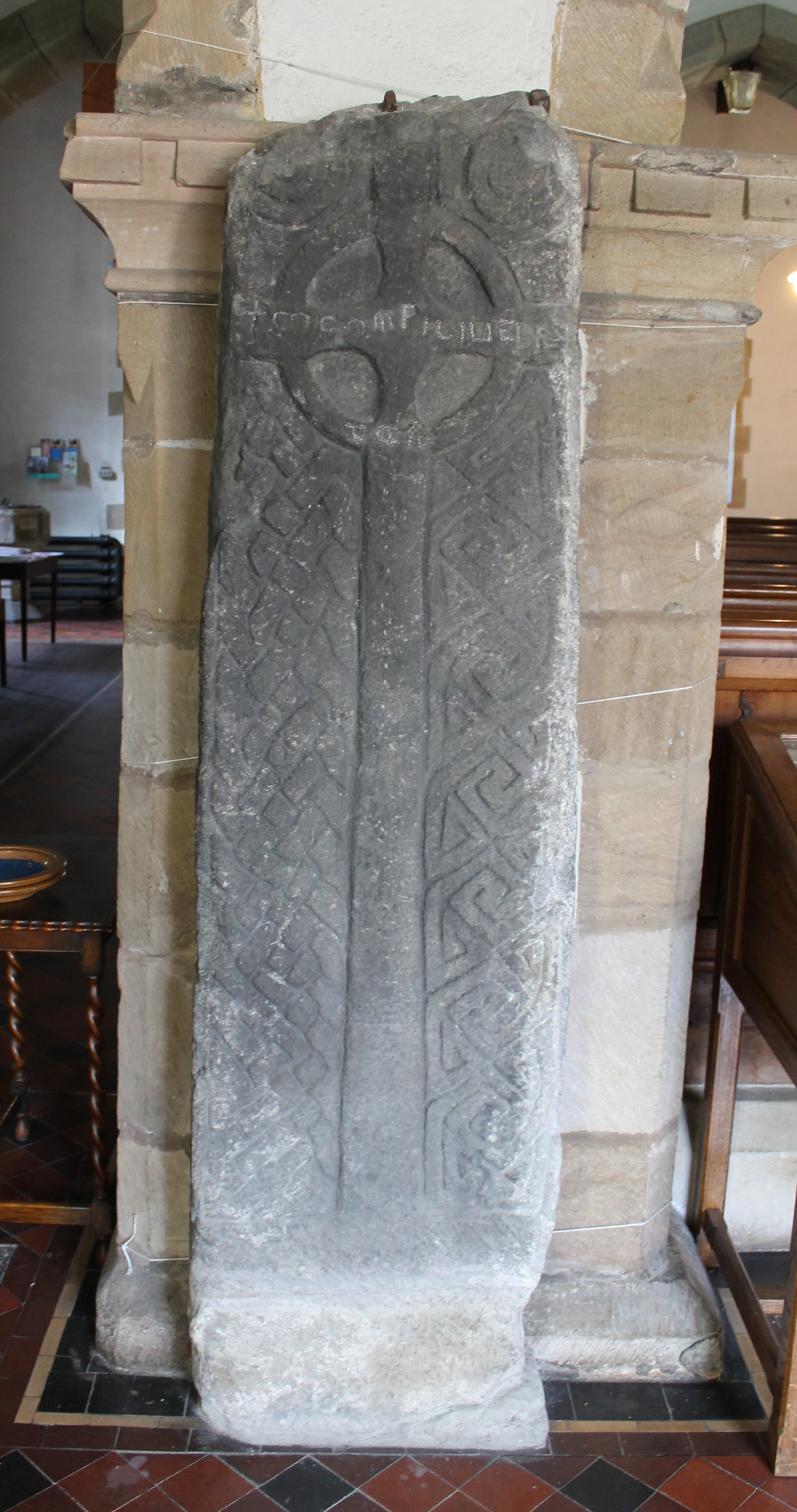
Carreg Gwgan (Gwgan's Stone); 9-10th century Celtic cross, kept in Church of St Dogfan

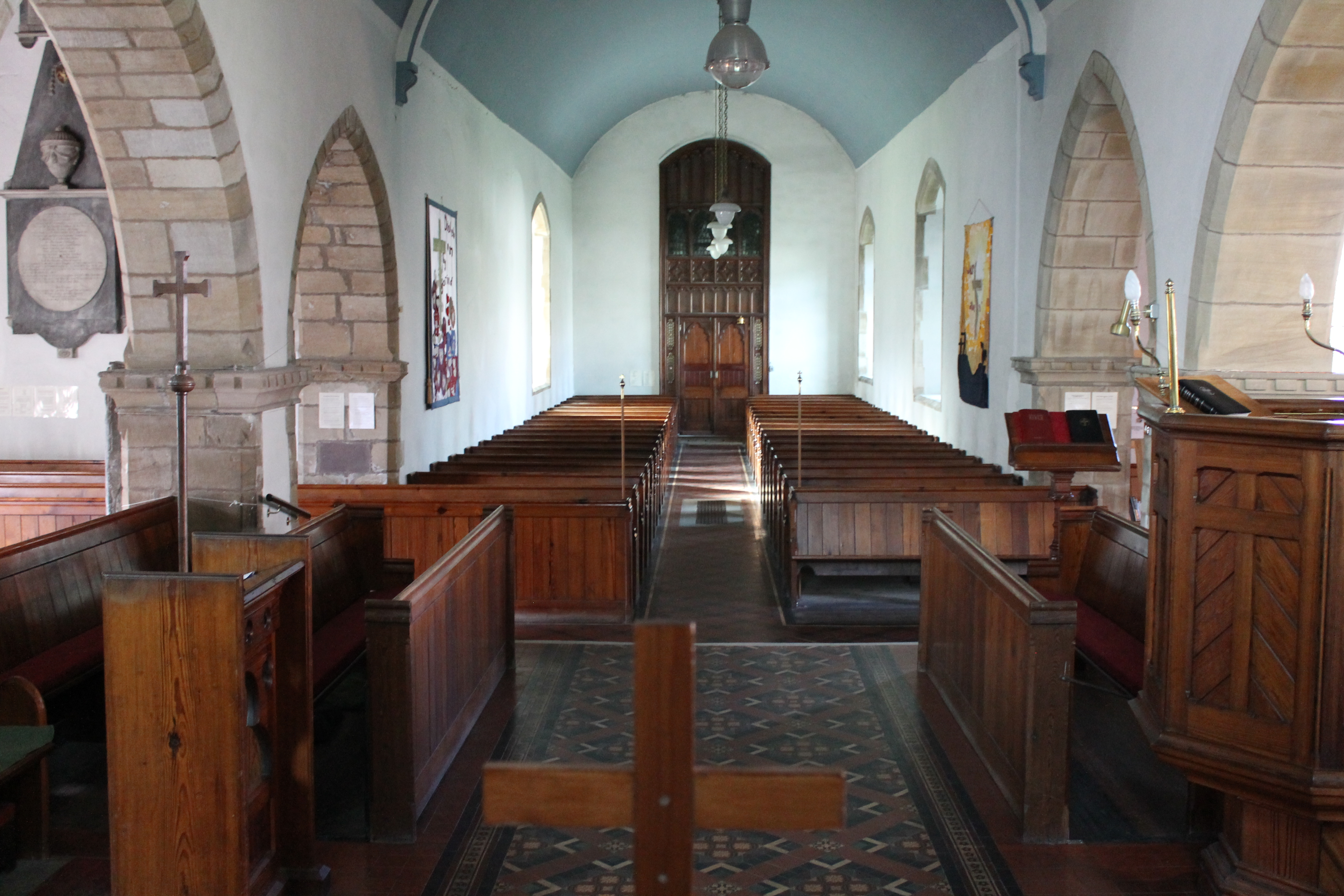
Church of St Dogfan

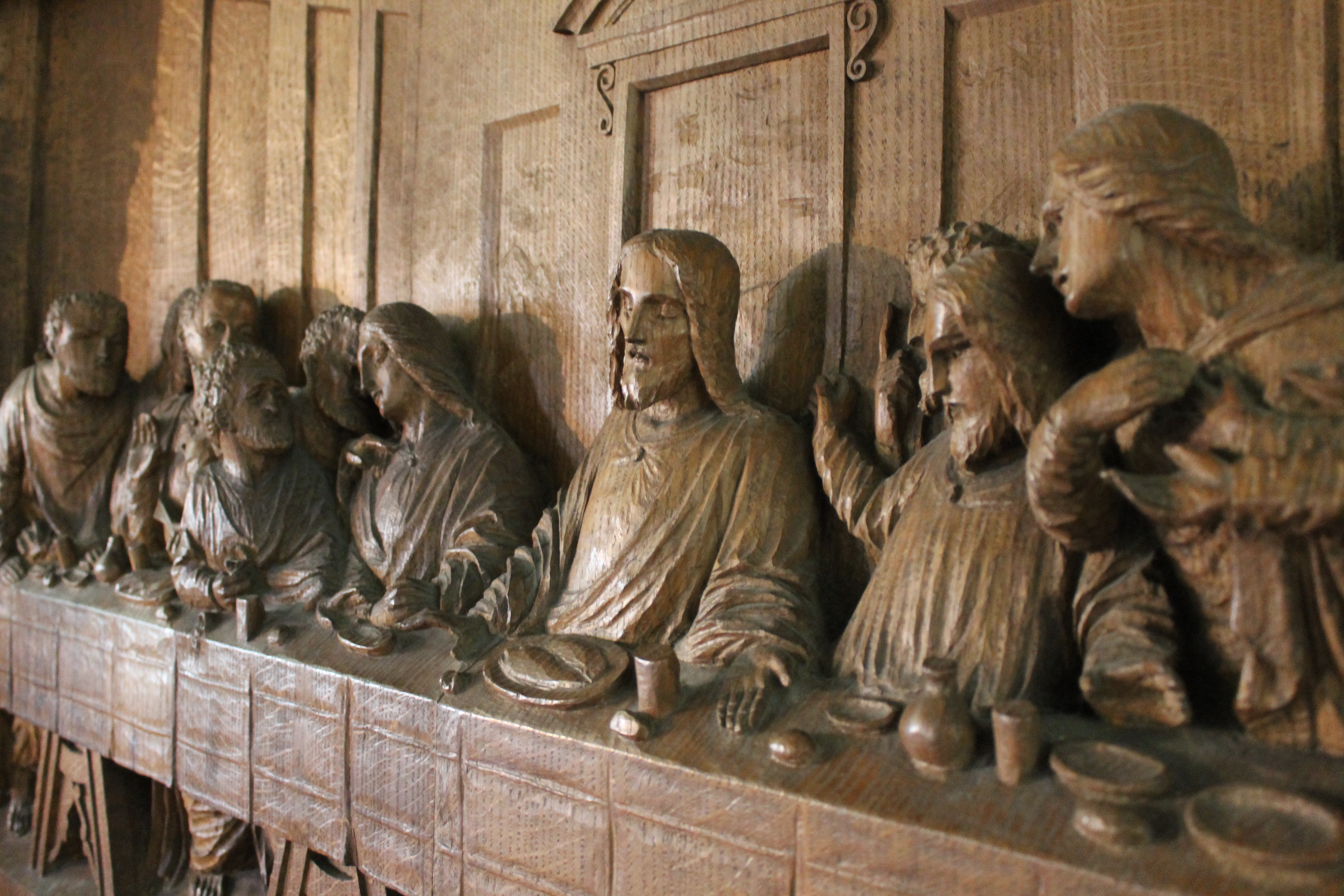
Wood carving by altar

== Transport ==
Bus services are operated by Tanat Valley Coaches, based in the village. Route 76 links the village with Llanfyllin, Meifod and Welshpool. Routes 79/79A connect the town with Llangynog, Llangedwyn, Penybontfawr and Oswestry.

The village was at one point served by the defunct Tanat Valley Light Railway which served Pentrefelin, Llanrhaiadr Mochnant and Pedairffordd Halt. Of these station, Llanrhaiadr Mochant was the closest one to the village being around a mile south east. These closed in 1951 to passengers along with the line to Llangynog, but the line remained open to freight to as far as Llanrhaeadr Mochant until 1964, when the entire line to Blodwell Junction was closed.

The trackbed has been incorporated into agricultural use, but the newly formed Tanat Valley Light Railway has expressed interest in reopening the line to as far as Llanrhaiadr Mochnant for heritage and tourist use; it is currently focused on reaching Blodwell Junction from Nantmawr.

== In popular culture ==
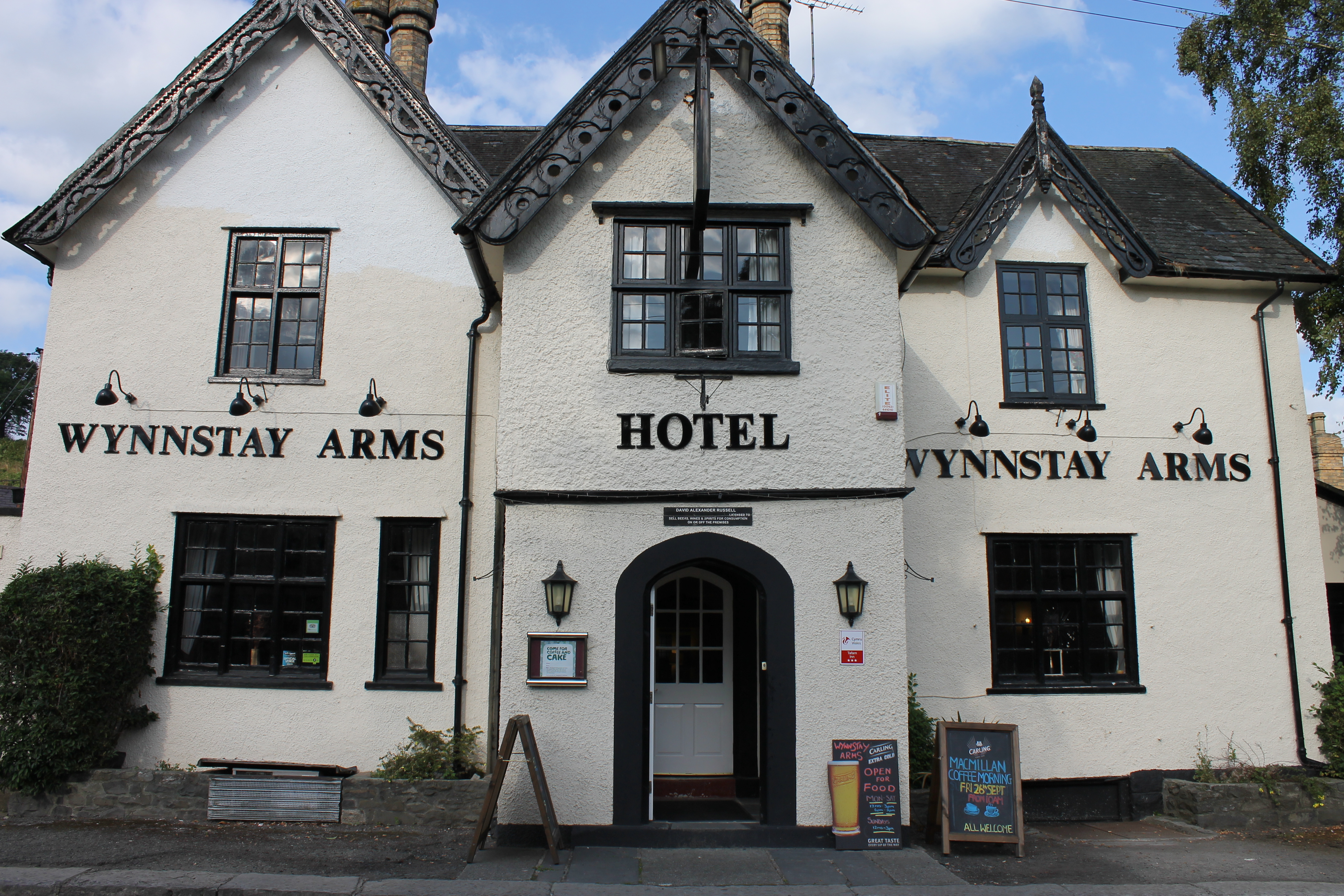
The Wynnstay Arms tavern

Parts of the 1995 film The Englishman Who Went up a Hill but Came down a Mountain, starring Hugh Grant, were filmed in the village, portraying the real-life village of Taff's Well in Rhondda Cynon Taf, which by 1995 had become too developed to use. More recently, the village featured in the 2012 film Nativity 2: Danger in the Manger with David Tennant, as the village where the St. Bernadette's school bus stops to buy sweets on the way to Lake Vyrnwy in search of the (fictitious) Castell Llawen ('Merry Castle').
