= Pedairffordd Halt railway station =

Former railway station in Powys, Wales

Pedairffordd Halt

General information
- Location: Llanrhaeadr-ym-Mochnant, Powys; Wales
- Coordinates: 52.8120°N 3.3118°W
- Grid reference: SJ115246
- Platforms: 1

Other information
- Status: Disused

History
- Original company: Tanat Valley Light Railway
- Pre-grouping: Cambrian Railways
- Post-grouping: Great Western Railway

Key dates
- 6 January 1904: Opened
- 15 January 1951: Closed
Location

Pedairffordd Halt railway station (alternatively Pedair-Ffordd Halt) was a station on the Tanat Valley Light Railway, located 1.3 miles south of Llanrhaeadr-ym-Mochnant, Powys, Wales in the hamlet Pedair-Ffordd. The station opened in 1904 and closed in 1951. There station was located on the east side of a level crossing.

Preceding station	Disused railways	Following station
Penybontfawr; Line and station closed	Cambrian Railways; Tanat Valley Light Railway	Llanrhaiadr Mochnant; Line and station closed
