= Penybontfawr railway station =

Former railway station in Powys, Wales

Penybontfawr

General information
- Location: Pen-y-bont-fawr, Powys; Wales
- Coordinates: 52.8129°N 3.3517°W
- Grid reference: SJ089248

Other information
- Status: Disused

History
- Original company: Tanat Valley Light Railway
- Pre-grouping: Cambrian Railways
- Post-grouping: Great Western Railway

Key dates
- 1904: Opened
- 15 January 1951: Closed
Location

Penybontfawr railway station was a station on the Tanat Valley Light Railway in Pen-y-bont-fawr, Powys, Wales. The station opened in 1904 and closed in 1951. The station site is now occupied by houses.

Preceding station	Disused railways	Following station
Llangynog; Line and station closed	Cambrian Railways; Tanat Valley Light Railway	Pedairffordd Halt; Line and station closed
