= Llanyblodwel Halt railway station =

Former railway station in Shropshire, England

Llanyblodwel Halt

General information
- Location: Llanyblodwel, Shropshire; England
- Coordinates: 52.7968°N 3.1275°W
- Grid reference: SJ239227
- Platforms: 1

Other information
- Status: Disused

History
- Original company: Tanat Valley Light Railway
- Pre-grouping: Cambrian Railways
- Post-grouping: Great Western Railway

Key dates
- 1904: Opened
- 15 January 1951: Closed
Location

Llanyblodwel Halt railway station was a station in Llanyblodwel, Shropshire, England, on the Tanat Valley Light Railway. The station opened in 1904 and closed in 1951. It was approached by a sloping footpath from a road over bridge that led down to a short single platform on the south side of the line with a timber waiting shelter. The platform is still extant.

Preceding station	Disused railways	Following station
Glanyrafon Halt; Line and station closed	Cambrian Railways; Tanat Valley Light Railway	Blodwell Junction; Line and station closed
