= Llanrhaiadr Mochnant railway station =

Former railway station in Powys, Wales

Llanrhaiadr Mochnant
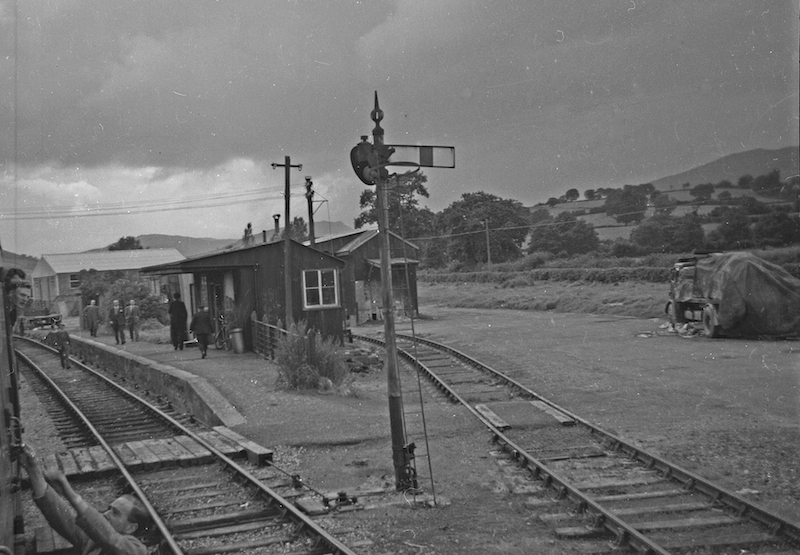
- Llanrhaiadr Mochnant station in 1958

General information
- Location: Llanrhaeadr-ym-Mochnant, Powys; Wales
- Coordinates: 52.8153°N 3.2861°W
- Grid reference: SJ133250
- Platforms: 2

Other information
- Status: Disused

History
- Original company: Tanat Valley Light Railway
- Pre-grouping: Cambrian Railways
- Post-grouping: Great Western Railway

Key dates
- 1904: Opened
- 15 January 1951: closed to passengers
- 6 January 1964: Closed
Location

Llanrhaiadr Mochnant railway station was a station near Llanrhaeadr-ym-Mochnant, Powys, Wales, on the Tanat Valley Light Railway. The station opened in 1904 and closed to passengers in 1951 and completely in 1964. The station was situated a mile south-east of the village and on the west side of a level crossing. It had two platforms and a passing loop as well as sidings to a goods yard and cattle dock.

Preceding station	Disused railways	Following station
Pedairffordd Halt; Line and station closed	Cambrian Railways; Tanat Valley Light Railway	Pentrefelin; Line and station closed
