= Llangedwyn Halt railway station =

Former railway station in Powys, Wales

Llangedwyn Halt

General information
- Location: Llangedwyn, Powys; Wales
- Coordinates: 52.8055°N 3.2117°W
- Grid reference: SJ183238
- Platforms: 2

Other information
- Status: Disused

History
- Original company: Tanat Valley Light Railway
- Pre-grouping: Cambrian Railways
- Post-grouping: Great Western Railway

Key dates
- 1904: Opened
- 15 January 1951: Closed
Location

Llangedwyn Halt railway station was a station on the Tanat Valley Light Railway in Llangedwyn, Powys, Wales. The station opened in 1904 and closed in 1951. There was a passing loop so there were two platforms with waiting shelters situated to the east of a level crossing. There was a siding from the east end serving the goods yard to the north of the station. The site today is occupied by Llangedwyn Home Farm.

Preceding station	Disused railways	Following station
Pentrefelin; Line and station closed	Cambrian Railways; Tanat Valley Light Railway	Llansilin Road; Line and station closed
