= Griffith Hartwell Jones =

British scholar

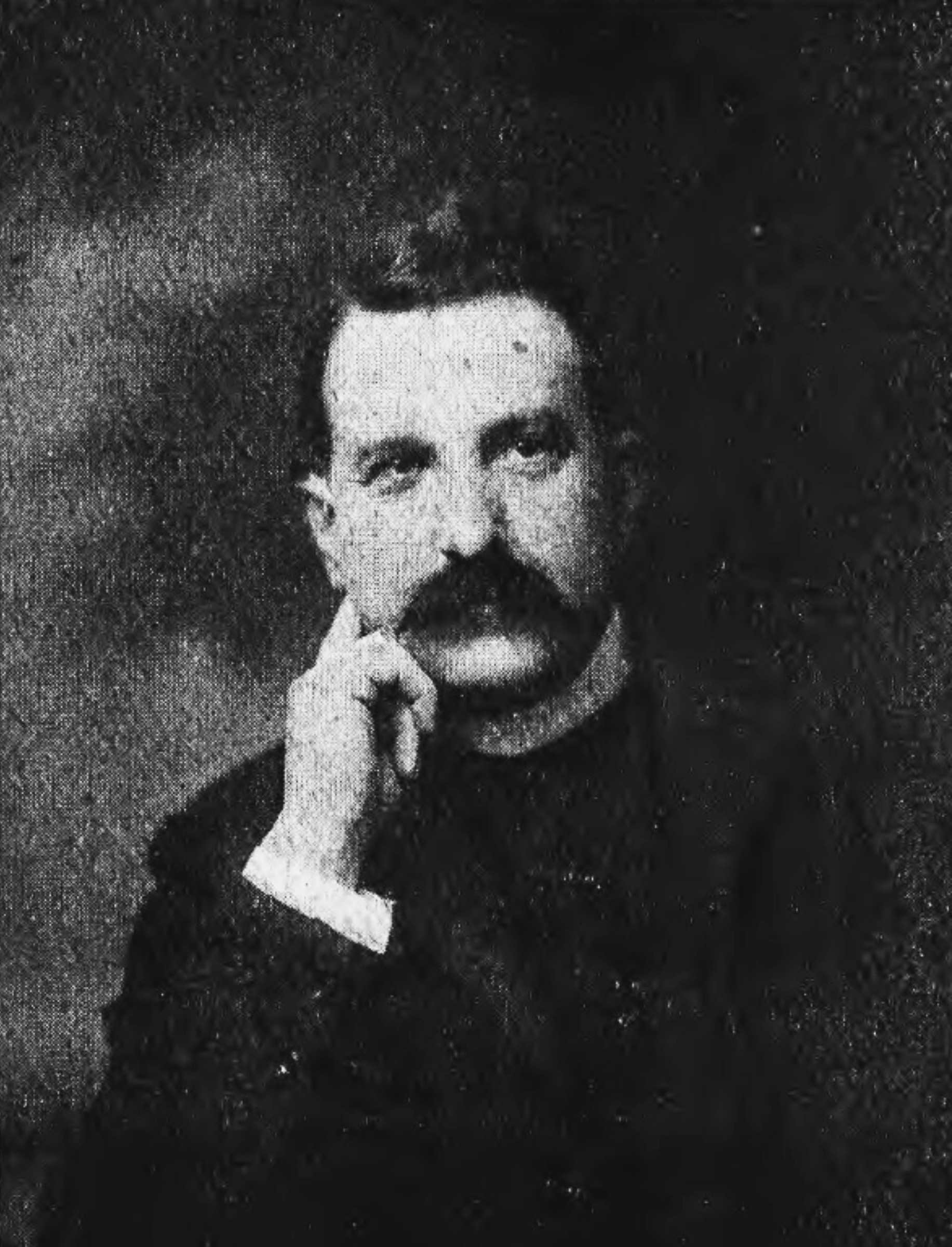
Griffith Hartwell Jones

Rev. Griffith Hartwell Jones (10 April 1859 – 27 May 1944) was a Welsh academic and Anglican clergyman.

He was born in Llanrhaeadr-ym-Mochnant, Denbighshire. He was educated at Shrewsbury School and Jesus College, Oxford, where he was a scholar, and became professor of Latin at the University College of South Wales and Monmouthshire, Cardiff, lecturing on historical and philological topics and writing extensively. He was also chairman of the National Eisteddfod Association, chairman of the council of the Honourable Society of Cymmrodorion and a member of the Royal Commission on the Ancient and Historical Monuments of Wales. He died in hospital in London on 27 May 1944 at the age of 85.
