= Pentrefelin railway station =

Former railway station in Powys, Wales

Pentrefelin

General information
- Location: Llanrhaeadr-ym-Mochnant, Powys; Wales
- Coordinates: 52.8113°N 3.2536°W
- Grid reference: SJ155245
- Platforms: 1

Other information
- Status: Disused

History
- Original company: Tanat Valley Light Railway
- Pre-grouping: Cambrian Railways
- Post-grouping: Great Western Railway

Key dates
- 6 January 1904: Opened
- 15 January 1951: Closed
Location

Pentrefelin railway station was a station on the Tanat Valley Light Railway, located two miles south-east of Llanrhaeadr-ym-Mochnant, Powys, Wales serving the hamlet of Pentrefelin. The station opened in 1904 and formally closed in 1951. The platform was located to the east of a level crossing on a minor road to Glantanat Isaf. The platform had a corrugated iron shelter, lamps and a nameboard. There was a goods loop on the north side of the line. The platform is still extant on farmland.

| Preceding station | Disused railways | Following station |
|---|---|---|
| Llanrhaiadr Mochnant; Line and station closed | Cambrian Railways; Tanat Valley Light Railway | Llangedwyn Halt; Line and station closed |
