= Robert Ellis (Cynddelw) =

Welsh poet and clergy (1812–1875)

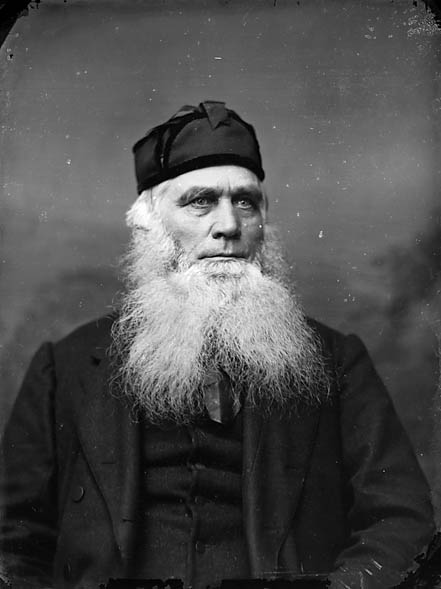
Robert Ellis (Cynddelw), c. 1865

Robert Ellis (also spelt Elis; 3 February 1812 – 19 August 1875), also known by the bardic name Cynddelw, was a Welsh language poet, editor, biographer, lexicographer and eisteddfod adjudicator. He was born at Tyn y Meini, Bryndreiniog, Pen-y-Bont-Fawr, in the historic county of Montgomeryshire in Mid Wales, where he initially worked as a farm labourer.

His bardic name honoured the 12th-century poet Cynddelw Brydydd Mawr.

== Ministry ==
Ellis was a Baptist minister, and is not to be confused with a Calvinistic Methodist minister of the same name also during the 19th-century.

Ellis served as a minister from 1836 to 1840 at Llanelian-yn-Rhos and Llanddulas, Denbighshire; from 1838 to 1840 Glyn Ceiriog in the Ceiriog Valley. From 1847 to 1862, he served at Carmel Chapel, Tredegar, South Wales. Jones (1969) documented that, while in Tredegar, Ellis supported two notable local historians. First, in his capacity as one of the adjudicators at the local 1862 eisteddfod, Ellis praised the entry of Hanes Tredegar (lit. 'History of Tredegar') by David Morris (Eiddil Gwent). Second, Ellis helped Evan Powell, who entered his History of Tredegar into the local 1884 eisteddfod, to blossom 'into a lover of books'.

Ellis served from 1862 until his death in 1875 at Caernarfon in North Wales.

== Publications ==
Ellis had his poem Yr Adgyfodiad published in 1849, in the Welsh-language newspaper Seren Gomer. Many other poems, biographies, an autobiography, and a dictionary followed. His dictionary, Geiriadur Cynddelw, which was published by H. Humphreys in Caernarfon in 1868, was one of the first dictionaries to be published only in Welsh (rather than English and Welsh).
