= Llangynog railway station =

Former railway station in Powys, Wales

Llangynog
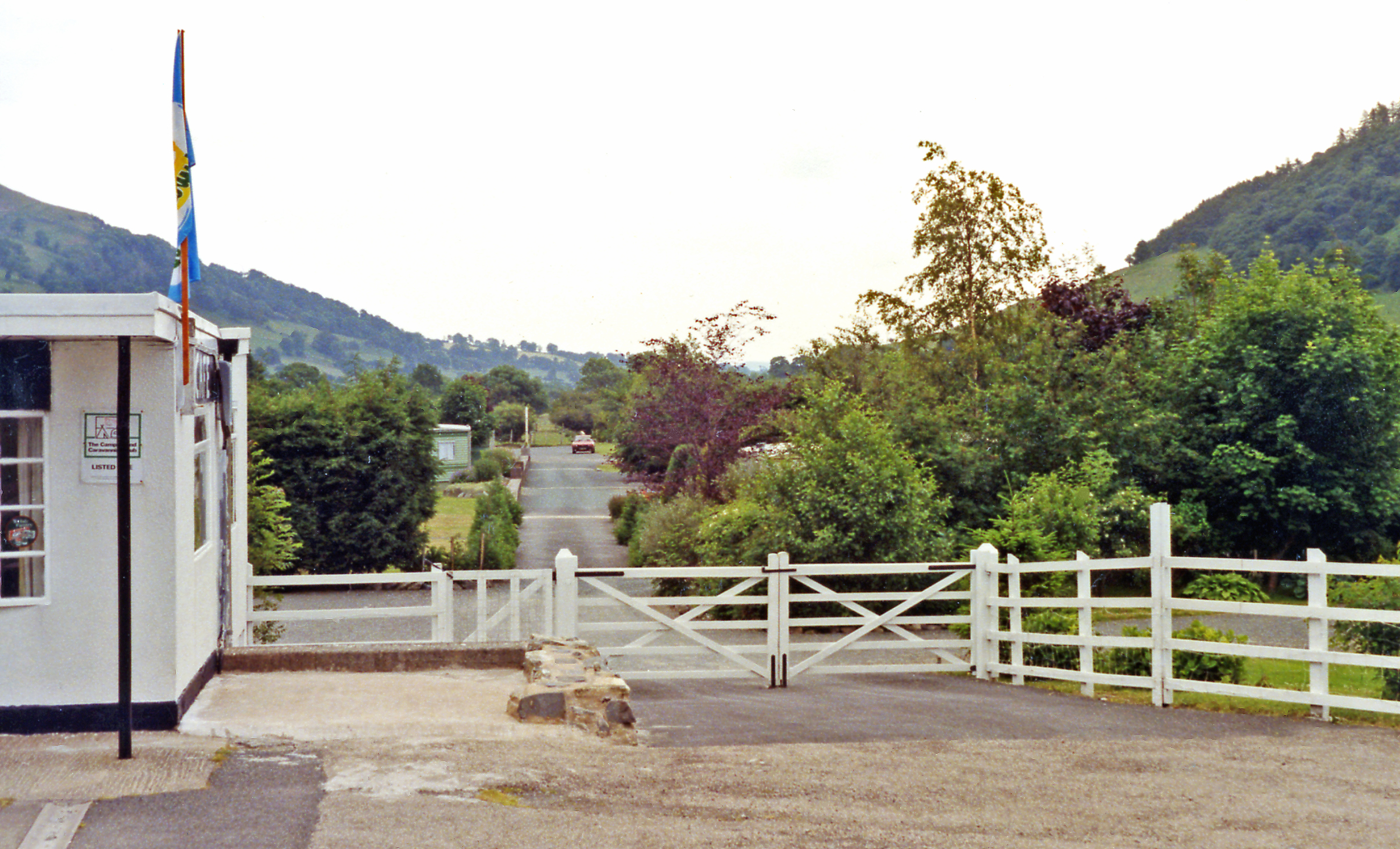
- The site of the station in 1992

General information
- Location: Llangynog, Powys; Wales
- Coordinates: 52.8256°N 3.4054°W
- Grid reference: SJ053263
- Platforms: 1

Other information
- Status: Disused

History
- Original company: Tanat Valley Light Railway
- Pre-grouping: Cambrian Railways
- Post-grouping: Great Western Railway

Key dates
- 1904: Opened
- 15 January 1951: Closed for passengers
- 1 July 1952: Closed for freight
Location

Llangynog railway station was the western terminus station of the Tanat Valley Light Railway in Llangynog, Powys, Wales. The station opened in 1904, closed for passengers in 1951 and closed completely in 1952. It had a single platform and a run round loop with sidings serving a goods yard on the north side. The site is now occupied by a caravan park.

Preceding station	Disused railways	Following station
Terminus	Cambrian Railways; Tanat Valley Light Railway	Penybontfawr; Line and station closed
