= Pen-y-Bont-Fawr =

Village and community in Powys, Wales

- Village and community
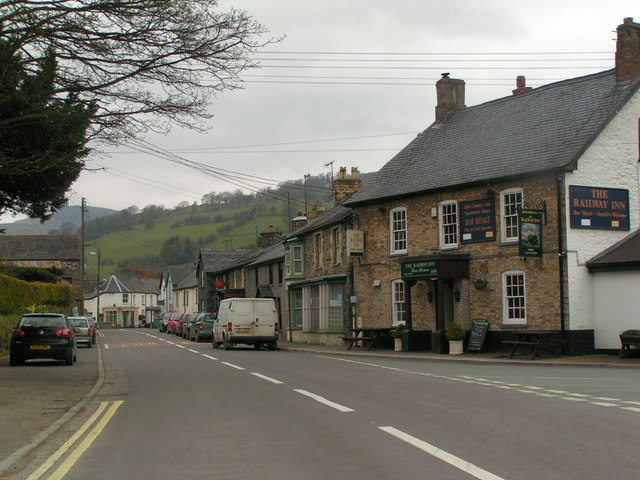
- The Railway Inn

- Location within Powys
- Principal area: Powys
- Country: Wales
- Sovereign state: United Kingdom
- Police: Dyfed-Powys
- Fire: Mid and West Wales
- Ambulance: Welsh
- List of places UK Wales Powys 52.8105°N 3.3565°W Community map: Map of the community

Pen-y-Bont-Fawr (or Penybontfawr) is a small village and community in the Tanat valley in Montgomeryshire, Powys, Wales. In the 2011 UK Census it had a population of 440 with 58% born in England and 39% in Wales (many nearby hospitals are in England).

It is in the electoral ward of Llanwddyn.

St Thomas's Church was built in 1855 in the Victorian Gothic style. It is a Grade II listed building.

Robert Ellis (1812–1875), bardic name Cynddelw, was a Welsh language poet, editor and lexicographer, He was born nearby at Tyn y Meini, Bryndreiniog.

Penybontfawr railway station was on the Tanat Valley Light Railway. The station opened in 1904 and closed in 1951.
