= Glanyrafon Halt railway station =

Former station on the Tanat Valley Light Railway in England

Glanyrafon Halt

General information
- Location: Llanyblodwel, Shropshire; England
- Coordinates: 52.8073°N 3.1500°W
- Grid reference: SJ224239
- Platforms: 1

Other information
- Status: Disused

History
- Original company: Tanat Valley Light Railway
- Pre-grouping: Cambrian Railways
- Post-grouping: Great Western Railway

Key dates
- 1 September 1904: Opened
- 15 January 1951: Closed
Location

Glanyrafon Halt railway station was a station on the Tanat Valley Light Railway, located a mile west of Llanyblodwel, Shropshire, England on the south side of the River Tanat. The station opened in 1904 and closed in 1951. It was located on the east side of an occupation crossing and could be accessed by a footbridge across the river from the hamlet of Glan-yr-afon.

Preceding station	Disused railways	Following station
Llansilin Road; Line and station closed	Cambrian Railways; Tanat Valley Light Railway	Llanyblodwel Halt; Line and station closed
