= Llansilin Road railway station =

Former railway station in Powys, Wales

Llansilin Road
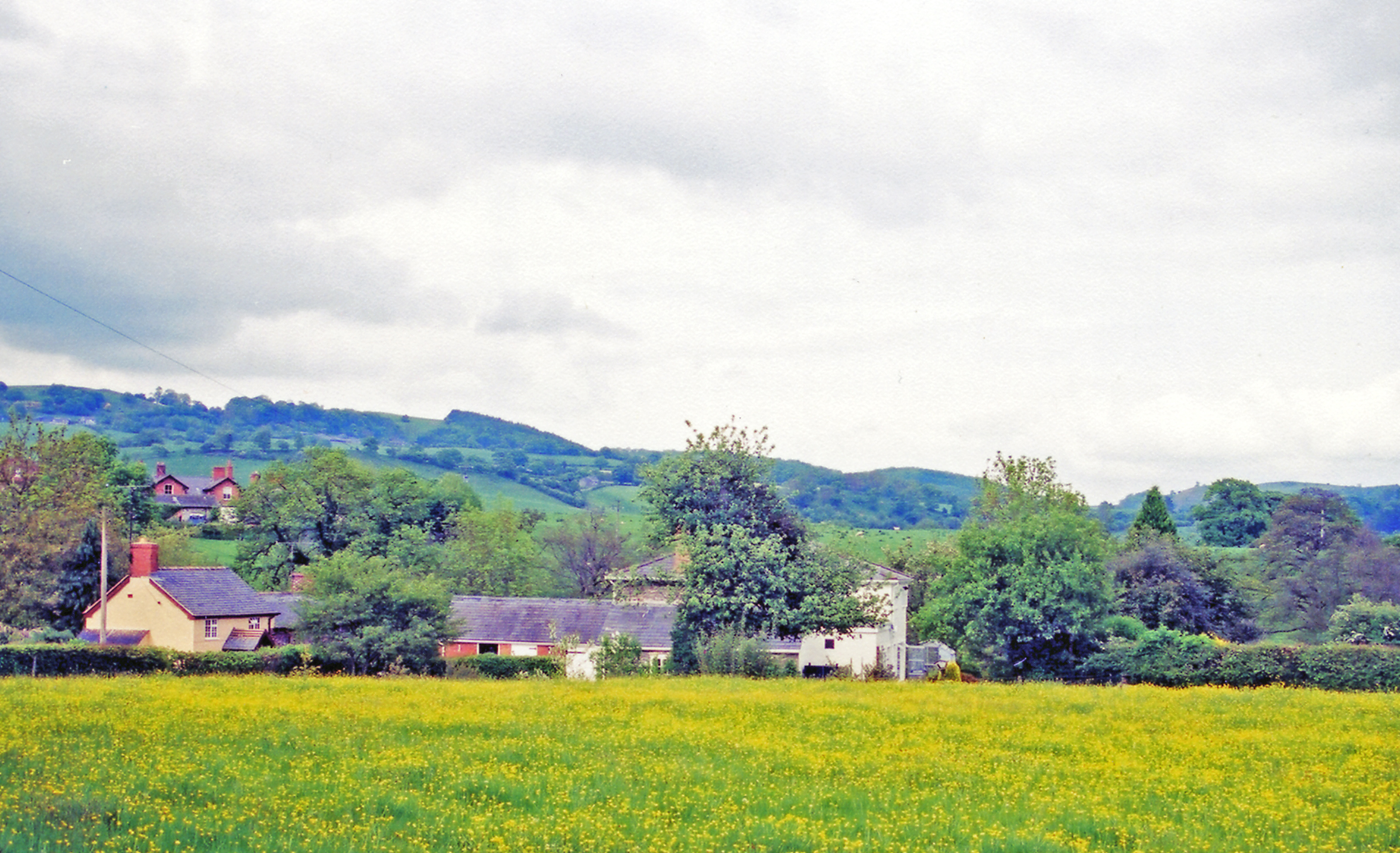
- The site of the station in 2001

General information
- Location: Llangedwyn, Powys; Wales
- Coordinates: 52.8027°N 3.1743°W
- Grid reference: SJ208234
- Platforms: 1

Other information
- Status: Disused

History
- Original company: Tanat Valley Light Railway
- Pre-grouping: Cambrian Railways
- Post-grouping: Great Western Railway

Key dates
- 1904: Opened
- 15 January 1951: Closed
Location

Llansilin Road railway station was a station on the Tanat Valley Light Railway in Llangedwyn, Powys, Wales. It had the "Road" suffix due to being 3 miles south from Llansilin and 4 miles by road. The station was located close to the hamlet of Pen-y-bont Llanerch Emrys, two miles east of Llangedwyn village, where the road from Llansilin joins the valley. The station opened in 1904 and formally closed in 1951. The short platform was situated between the railway and the road and had a corrugated iron shelter with a forward sloping roof, two lamps and a nameboard. There was a loop on the north side to serve a cattle dock as well as a siding from the west end serving a wharf in the goods yard, all controlled by a ground frame. The platform is still extant in the goods yard site.

Preceding station	Disused railways	Following station
Llangedwyn Halt; Line and station closed	Cambrian Railways; Tanat Valley Light Railway	Glanyrafon Halt; Line and station closed
