= Tanat Valley Light Railway =

Heritage railway in Shropshire, England

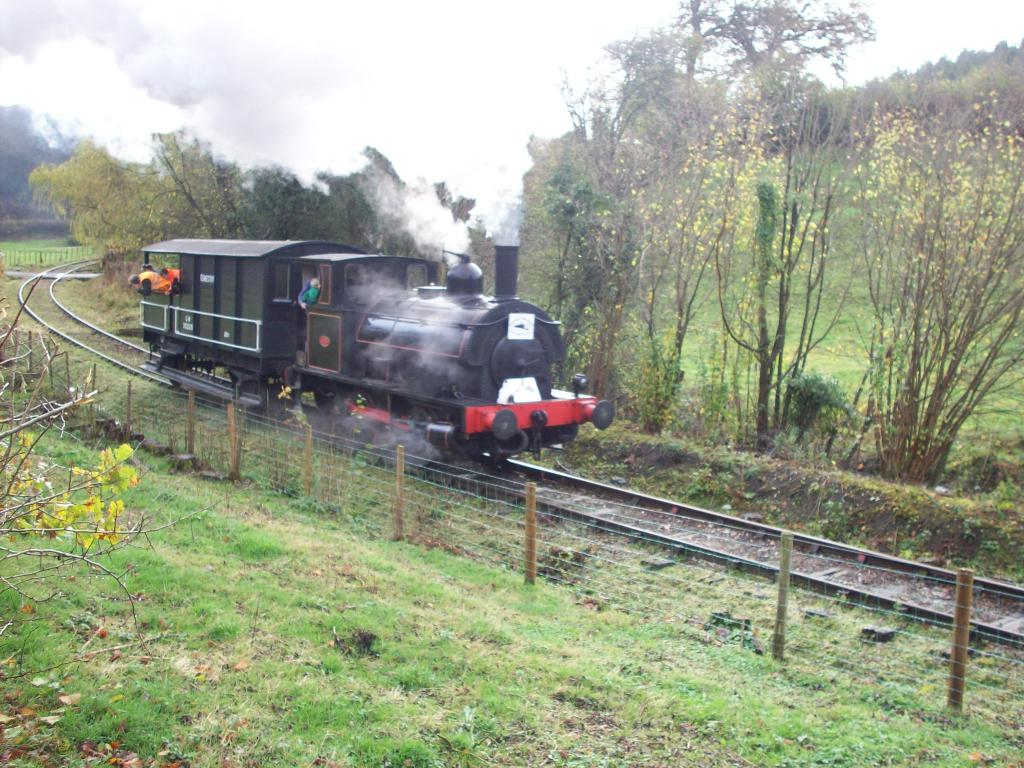
- Heritage locomotive no. 1827 on the TVLR in 2009.

Commercial operations
- Original gauge: 4 ft 8 1/2 in (1,435 mm)

Preserved operations
- Length: 1/3 mile (0.536 km)
- Preserved gauge: 4 ft 8 1/2 in (1,435 mm)

Commercial history
- Opened: 1903/1904
- Closed: 1952 Passenger; 1964 Freight

Preservation history
- 2009: Re-opened

The Tanat Valley Light Railway (TVLR) was a 15-mile (24 km) long standard gauge light railway. It ran westwards from Llanyblodwel in Shropshire, about 5 miles or 8 km southwest of Oswestry. It crossed the Wales–England border and continued up the Tanat Valley, terminating at Llangynog in Powys. It opened in 1904, providing access to a fairly remote area, and transport facilities for slate production and agriculture.

Its promoters were unable to raise the capital to construct the line, but a number of government grants and considerable generosity by the Cambrian Railways company enabled the building of the line. The company was always in debt and in 1921 was obliged to sell the line to the Cambrian Railways.

Rural passenger use collapsed and the railway closed to passengers in 1951, and completely in 1964.

A new Tanat Valley Light Railway Company was established, and in 2009 opened a heritage railway centre at Nantmawr, close to the earlier Tanat Valley line.

== History ==
=== Proposals ===
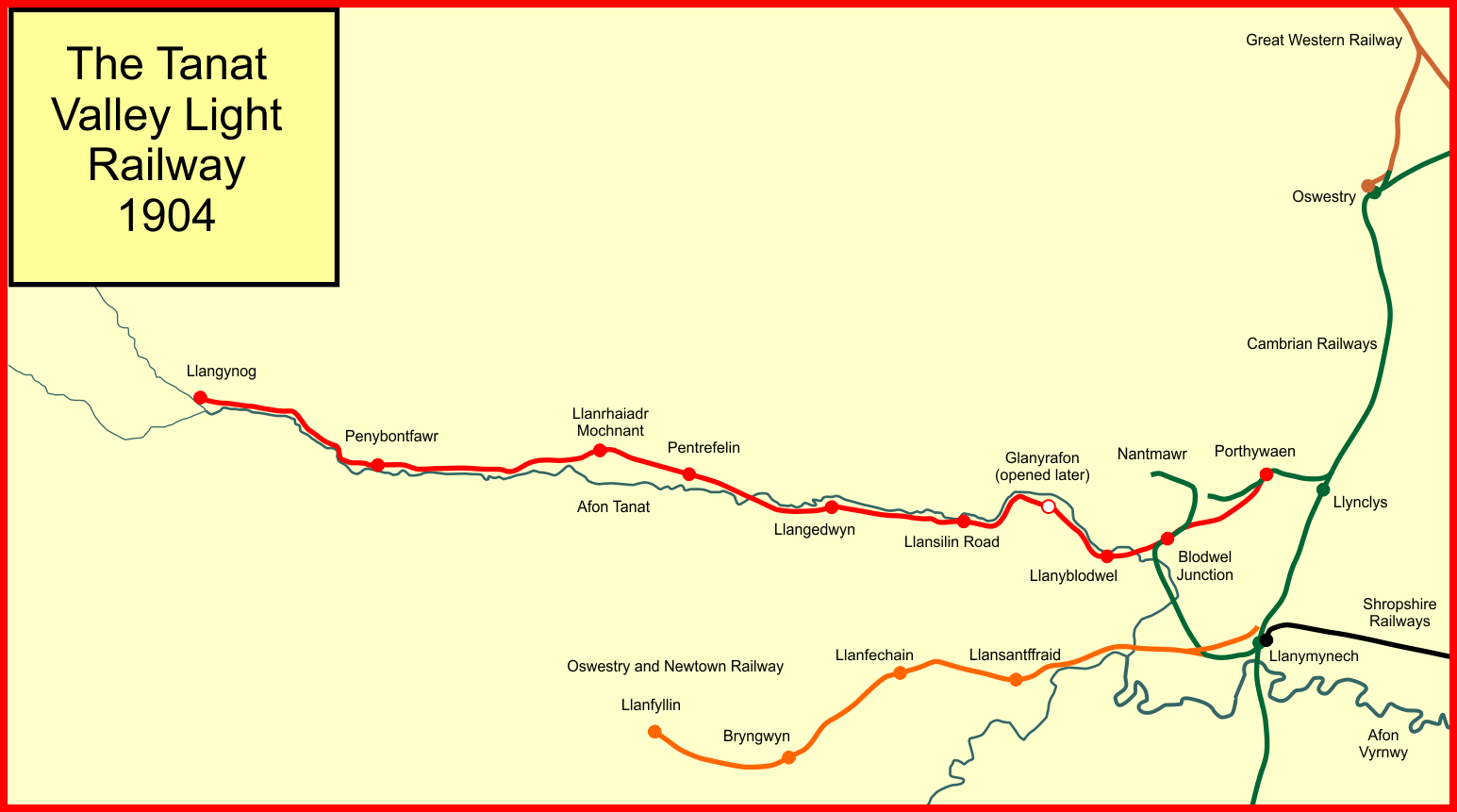
The Tanat Valley Light Railway system

There were many populous villages in the area between the Great Western Railway route through Llangollen, to the north and the Cambrian Railways line through Welshpool to the south. The Berwyn and Aran mountains (with steep gradients and sparse population) together formed a barrier for a through railway line westwards towards the coast. Slate quarrying and agriculture were the area's dominant industries, and both suffered in the mid 19th century from transport difficulties.

Several schemes were put forward over the years, but they failed due to lack of interest from subscribers. One ambitious scheme was to extend the West Midland Railway through the region, passing through Montgomery and Bala, penetrating the Berwyns by a long tunnel. If this scheme had been successful, it would perhaps have given the Great Western Railway a trunk line to Holyhead; as it was, the Chester and Holyhead Railway was adopted instead.

In 1866 the Potteries, Shrewsbury and North Wales Railway opened from Shrewsbury to the quarries and Nantmawr. That railway was intended to continue through the Tanat Valley to Porthmadog, but it failed to raise the necessary capital. In 1882 an Oswestry and Llangynog Railway had been authorised by an act of Parliament, the Oswestry and Llangynog Railway Act 1882 (45 & 46 Vict. c. cxcviii), but it failed to raise the necessary capital and was formally abandoned in 1889.

=== A definite scheme ===
The Light Railways Act 1896 was passed to enable the construction of low-cost railways. This encouraged renewed consideration of a railway in the Tanat Valley, and two alternative schemes were developed. One was for a narrow gauge line from the Llanfyllin terminus of the Cambrian Railways branch. The other was for a standard gauge line from Porthywaen, four miles south of Oswestry. After deliberation, the latter was adopted.

The Cambrian Railways agreed to work the line for 60% of gross receipts, and a Treasury grant of £22,000 was agreed, as well as an interest-free loan of £6,000. Financial assistance was also made available from local councils; the share capital of the company was £15,000.

The General Manager of the Cambrian Railways, Mr C. S. Denniss, estimated the capital cost of the line at £46,000. Receipts would be £2,950 per annum. After interest and fixed charges, this would enable a dividend of 4% to be paid. "The margin is admittedly small", he commented. The same newspaper report asserted different figures provided by the Town Clerk of Oswestry, Mr J. Parry-Jones. The total capital of the company was to be £65,500. Local authorities had promised £18,500 in loans or share subscriptions; £18,000 had been promised as a free grant (though with conditions) by the Treasury; £20,000 had been promised by the Trustees of the Llangedwyn Estate, probably as a share subscription; £1,500 in shares by the Earl of Powis, and about £4,000 by other local investors. "The company's borrowing powers are £12,000, so that towards the £65,500 capital required, they are sure of over £55,900." On this extremely shaky basis the company was founded.

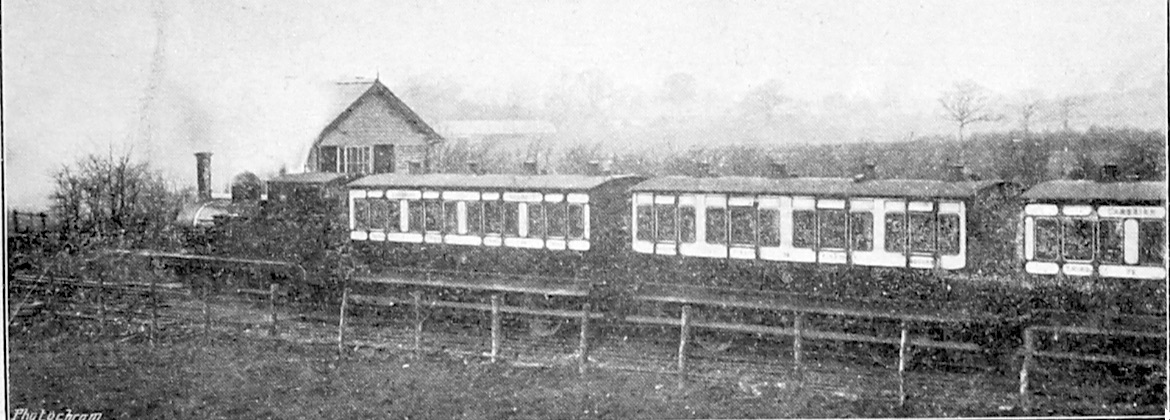
Cambrian Railways train on Tanat Valley Light Railway in 1904

The Tanat Valley Light Railway Order 1898 was granted on 12 September 1899, although modifying orders were needed; one in 1904 and the Tanat Valley Light Railway (Additional Powers) Order 1908 to assist in raising capital.

J. Strachan of Cardiff was selected as the contractor: he had been the contractor for the construction of the Welshpool and Llanfair Light Railway. The first sod was cut at Porthywaen on 12 September 1899 by the Countess of Powis, but construction did not start until July 1901. During the construction period, Strachan arranged to convey passengers free of charge on market days over part of the line. Some goods traffic probably also passed at this time. Contemporary travellers reported:

"The little six-wheeled engine ... was spinning along a quite a rate, considering its small wheel diameter; the carriage was a four-wheeled one, painted a dull red, and probably used at other times to convey the navvies to and from their work."

The line was inspected by the Board of Trade Inspecting Officer on 21 December 1903; the line was formally opened on 5 January 1904, and the public passenger service started the following day.

When in 1906 Tyer and Company claimed £2,480 for signalling and lighting equipment supplied for the line, the Tanat Valley Company claimed that they had only ordered the apparatus "on behalf of the Cambrian Railways".

=== Description of the line ===
Perkins and Fox-Davies described the line in 1905.

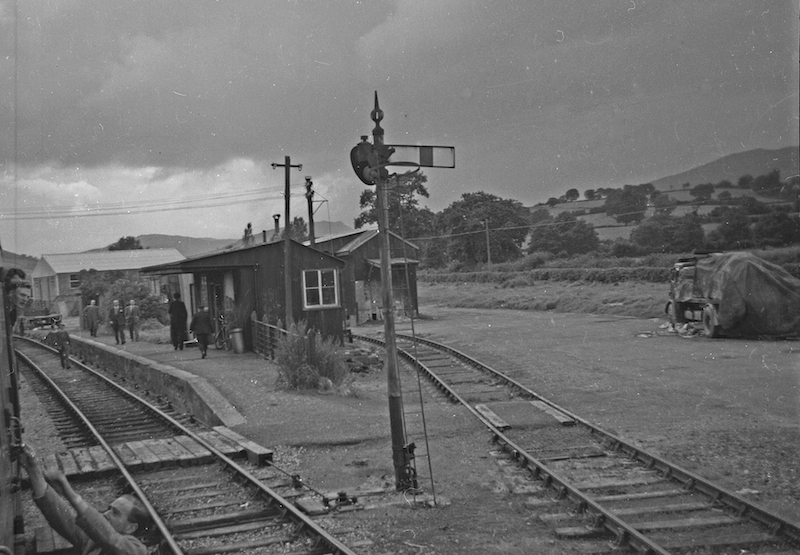
Llanrhaiadr Mochnant station, with a railway enthusiasts' special train in 1958

The passenger trains ran from Oswestry, southwards over the Cambrian Railways line as far as Llynclys, then turning west on the Cambrian Railways Porthywaen branch, leaving that at Porthywaen passenger station, a very small building, and now entering on the Tanat Valley line itself. The track was of much lighter construction now, consisting of Vignoles pattern (flat-bottom) rails dogged direct to the sleepers. The Nantmawr branch of the Cambrian Railways converged from the north. The first TVR station was Blodwel Junction, a single platform station. Blodwel station had been opened in 1866, the terminus of the Potteries line, and known then as Llanyblodwel, part of the mineral branch crossing the path of the TVR. A road crosses the railway by a bridge at Blodwel; this is the only place where there is a bridge crossing of a road. (Note: The Welsh spelling Blodwel is taken from the account of Perkins and Fox-Davies; however the official station names used in Bradshaw timetables anglicised this to Blodwell and Llanyblodwell.)

The next station stop was at Llanyblodwel; a short distance after the station the train stopped for the engine to take water. Glanyrafon was next geographically, but was not yet open when Perkins and Fox-Davies visited, and it was not referred to by them. This section was followed by a crossing into Wales, climbing at 1 in 64. Llansilin Road is the next station, serving Penybont. Llangedwyn station is next, where there was provision for crossing trains on the single line, followed by the small station of Pentrefelin, and then Llanrhaiadr Mochnant, also built as a passing station. A reservoir for Liverpool Corporation Waterworks was built at a location five miles away, and the railway was used for importing some construction materials. The line continues, calling at Pedair Ffordd and terminates at Llangynog. The journey time from Oswestry was 70 to 75 minutes.

The gradients on the line generally rose to Llangynog. It fell with a short section at 1 in 72 to Blodwel Junction, and then rose with a half mile at 1 in 64 but generally more moderate gradients all the way to the terminus. Porthywaen was at 132 feet above Ordnance Datum and Llangynog at 320 feet.

=== Operations ===
Baughan says that passenger carriages ran with the mineral trains from 1904, but this ended on the first day of 1917. Mineral revenue was about twenty times the value of passenger receipts, and the latter declined further in the 1920s and 1930s as reliable road transport was developed. While railways had an inherent advantage in transporting heavy minerals, the line's viability was dependent on the commercial success of local quarries, and when this declined the finances of the line became irretrievable.

Glanyrafon station opened soon after the opening of the line. (Note: According to Baughan. Cobb gives 1928 as the date of opening, but this must be wrong as the stop appears in the 1922 Bradshaw.)

The passenger train service in 1922 consisted of three trains each way between Oswestry and Llangynog, with an extra train on the first Wednesday of the month. The Glanyrafon stop was by request only.

In July 1938 the service was more complicated: successive trains ran from Oswestry to Llangynog respectively on Wednesdays; daily except Wednesday and Sunday; Monday, Tuesday and Friday; Wednesday Thursday and Saturday; daily except Saturday and Sunday; on Saturday only; and on the first Wednesday of every month, but also on 30 July. The return service was a little simpler, running respectively on Wednesday; weekdays only; weekdays only; Monday to Friday; and Saturdays only. By this time the Glanyrafon stop had become definite.

=== Absorbed by the Cambrian Railways ===
Opening its line in 1904, the Tanat Valley Light Railway Company was in the hands of the receiver continuously from that year, as its income did not enable it to pay the interest on loans. The Cambrian Railways subsidised it, but by 1921 it was obvious that improvements to the track and bridges were required, and this was beyond the financial resources of the bankrupt company. Takeover by the Cambrian was the only way out, and this was authorised by the Cambrian Railways (Tanat Valley Light Railway Transfer) Order 1921.

The Cambrian Railways were themselves taken over by the Great Western Railway the following year.

=== Closure ===
Passenger services were discontinued on 15 January 1951. The line west of Llanrhaiadr was closed completely in July 1952, a residual goods service continuing as far as that point for the time being. The line closed completely in December 1960.

== Station list ==
Opened 6 January 1904; closed 15 January 1951;

- Porthywaen; Cambrian Railways station;
- Blodwell Junction;
- Llanyblodwell;
- Glanyrafon;
- Llansilin Road;
- Llangedwyn;
- Pentrefelin;
- Llanrhaiadr Mochnant;
- Pedair Ffordd;
- Penybontfawr;
- Llangynog.

== Heritage railway ==
=== T&WA order ===
The Cambrian Heritage Railway (CHR) applied for a Transport & Works Act Order for transfer of NR's residual rights to itself and this was granted on 28 February 2017. This permits the CHR to reopen the route from Gobowen to Blodwel Quarry subject to level crossings of the A5 and A483 being replaced by a tunnel and overbridge respectively.

=== Trains ===
A new Tanat Valley Light Railway Company (TVLR) is based by the former lime kilns in Nantmawr, on the old Cambrian Railways branch. The TVLR plans to operate trains from Nantmawr to Llanddu by Blodwell Quarry. The TVLR operated its first trains over a 1/3 mile (0.54 km) section of the track in November 2009. In May 2018 the railway acquired a Ruston & Hornsby 88 diesel shunter, nicknamed "Crabtree", and a Class 309 EMU from the closed Electric Railway Museum in Warwickshire. In July 2021 the railway took delivery of two recently withdrawn Class 143 Pacers from Transport for Wales. In August 2022 a third Class 143 Pacer was delivered to the railway.

=== Stock List ===
- Diesel multiple unit vehicles
  - BR Class 143 Pacer unit no. 143601 (55642+55667)
  - BR Class 143 Pacer unit no. 143616 (55657+55682)
  - BR Class 143 Pacer unit no. 143619 (55660+55685)

All three of these units were offered for sale in 2025 following a change of policy at the railway.

- Diesel locomotives
  - Ruston & Hornsby 4wd Diesel Mechanical 88DS b. 1953 Wks. No. 338416 "Crabtree"
  - Ruston & Hornsby 4wd Diesel Mechanical 88DS No 416568
  - Ruston & Hornsby 4wd Diesel Mechanical 165DS No 390772 "Francis Baily Of Thatcham"
- Static electric multiple unit
  - 960101 Class 309 serving as a museum and buffet train at Nantmawr

=== Monorail ===
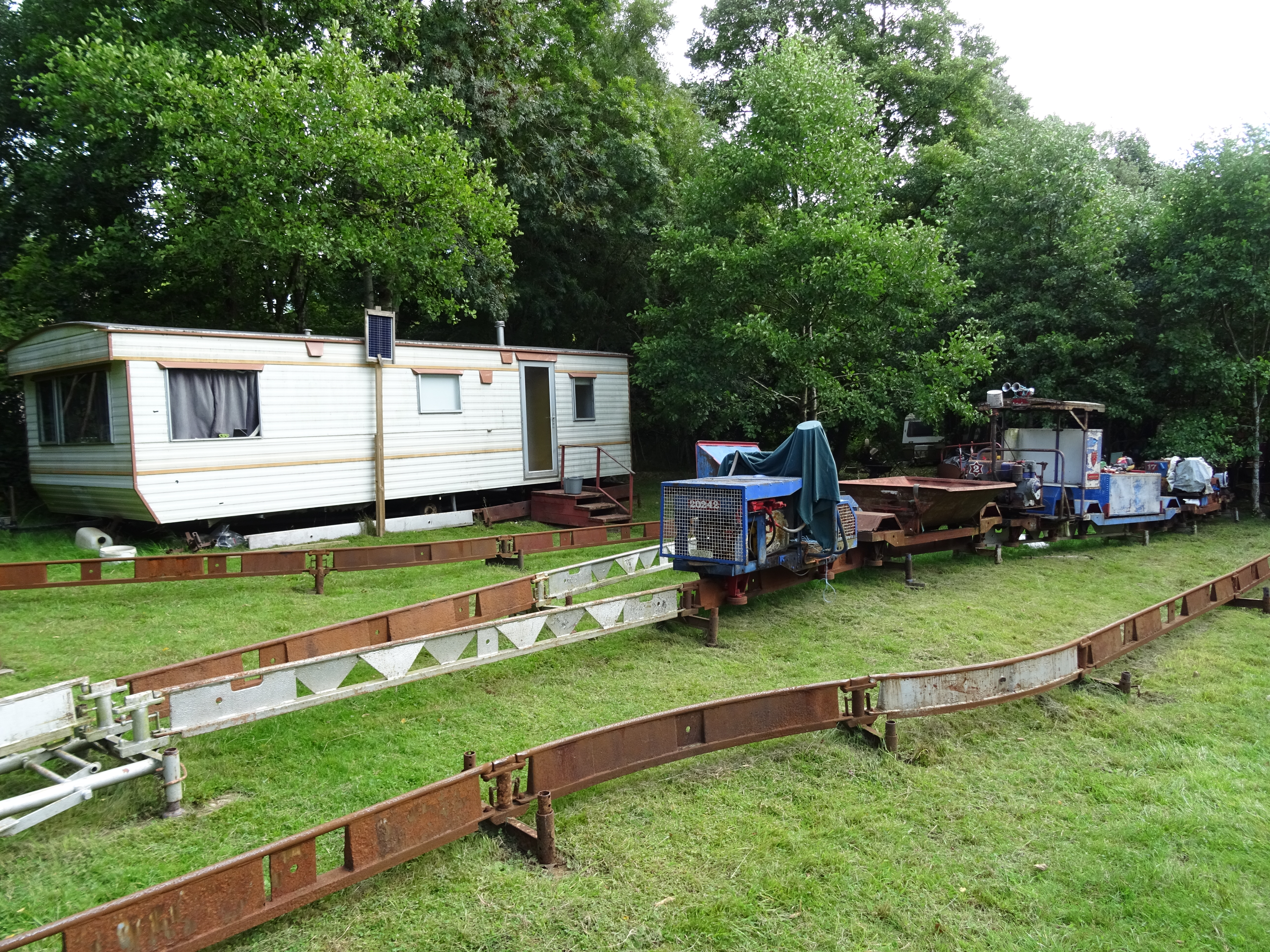
Portable industrial monorail designed in the 1940s by Road Machines (Drayton) Ltd.

Around 2016 the railway acquired a portable industrial monorail, designed by Road Machines (Drayton) Ltd. and used for construction projects in the mid 20th century, along with several diesel locomotives and an 0-2-0 steam locomotive from its last permanent storage at Blaenau Ffestiniog.

=== Nant Mawr visitor centre ===
The Nant Mawr visitor centre includes a nature trail, various picnic spots and a small museum.

=== Public access ===
The railway typically opens around seven weekends per year from June to November and participates in Heritage Open Days in early to mid September.

== Heritage railway gallery ==
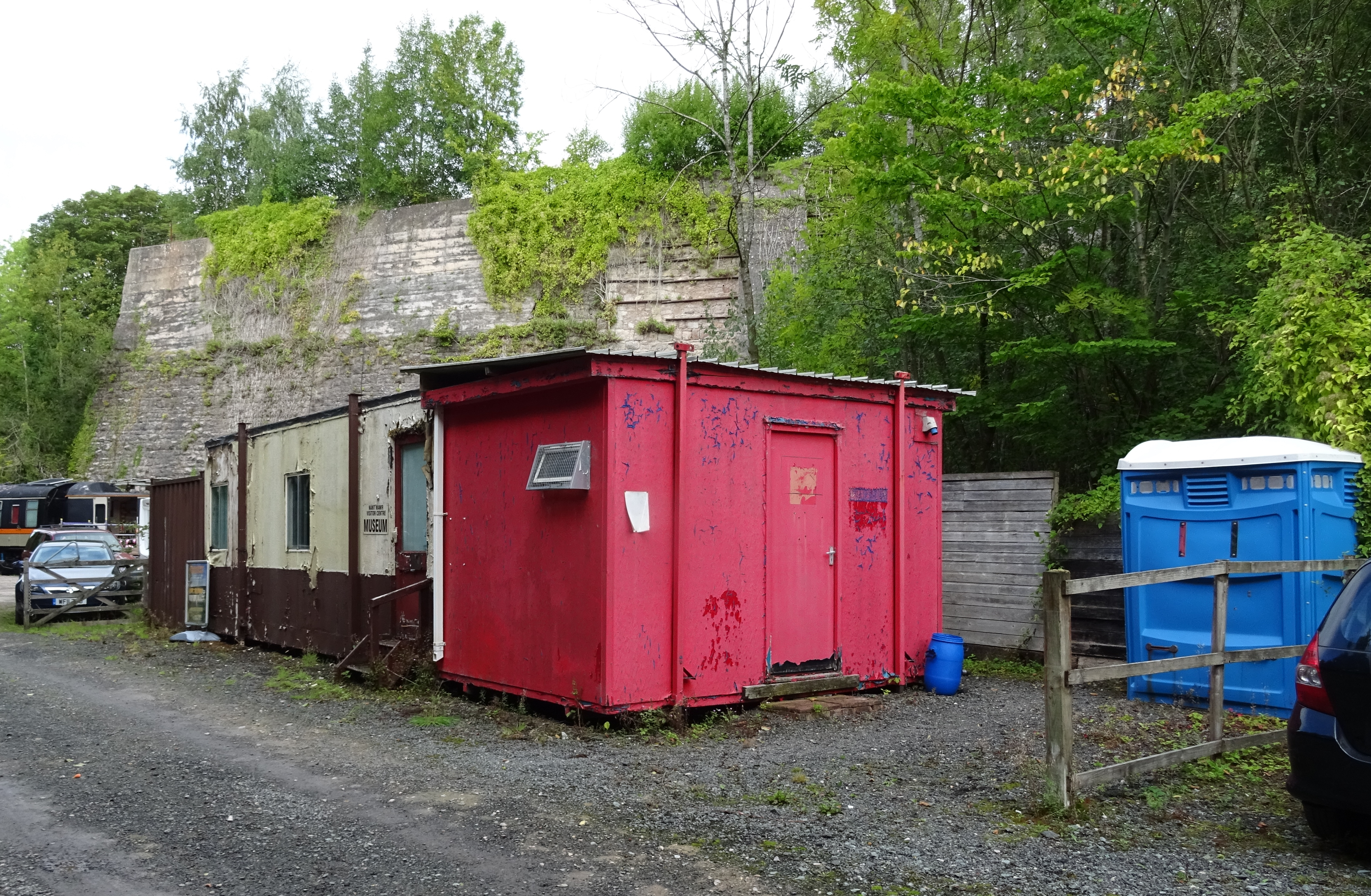
Previous museum and visitor centre by the car park at Nantmawr in Shropshire in September 2018.

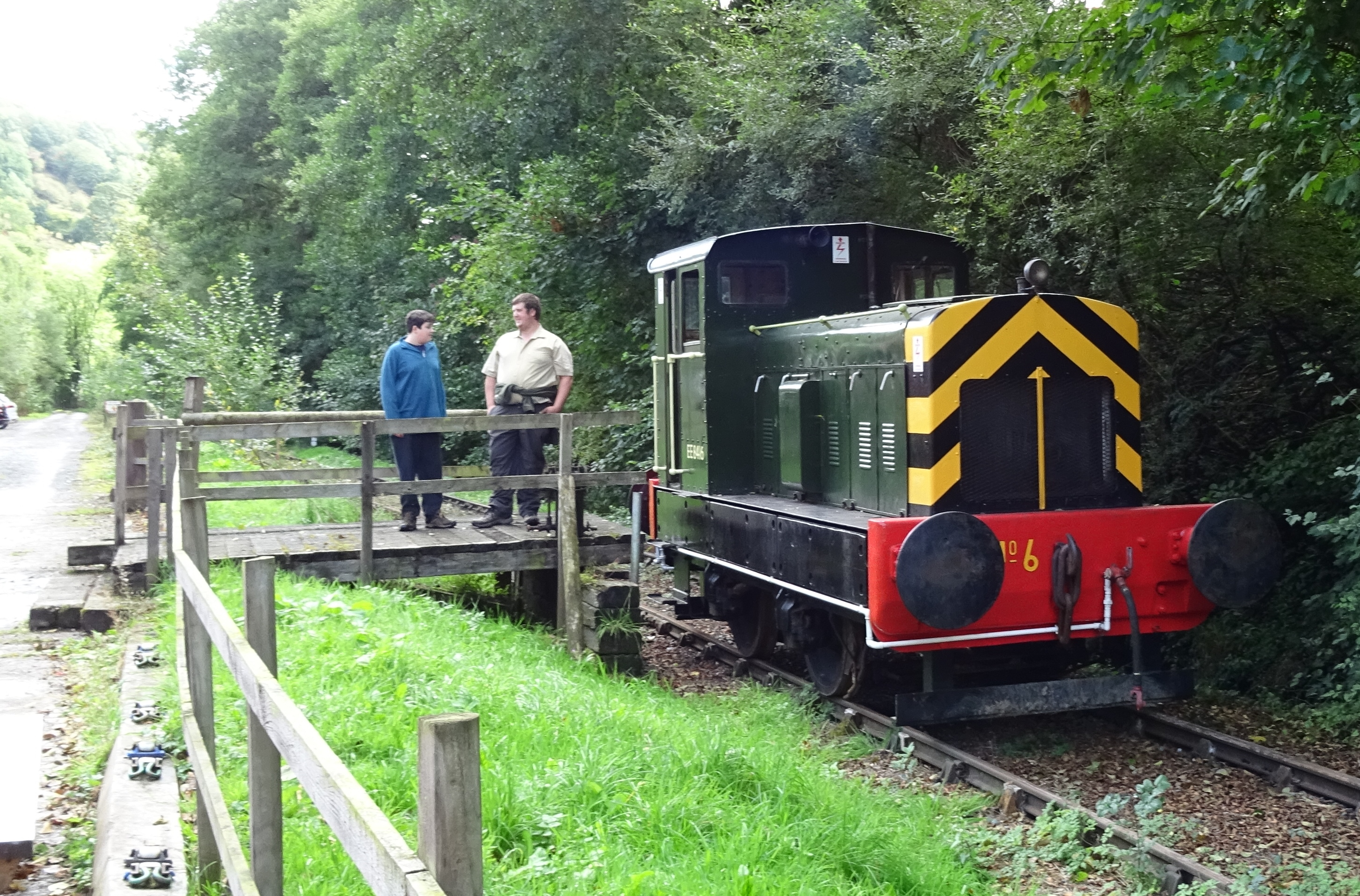
Ruston & Hornsby 4wd Diesel Mechanical 88 shunter "Crabtree" at the temporary wooden platform at Nantmawr.

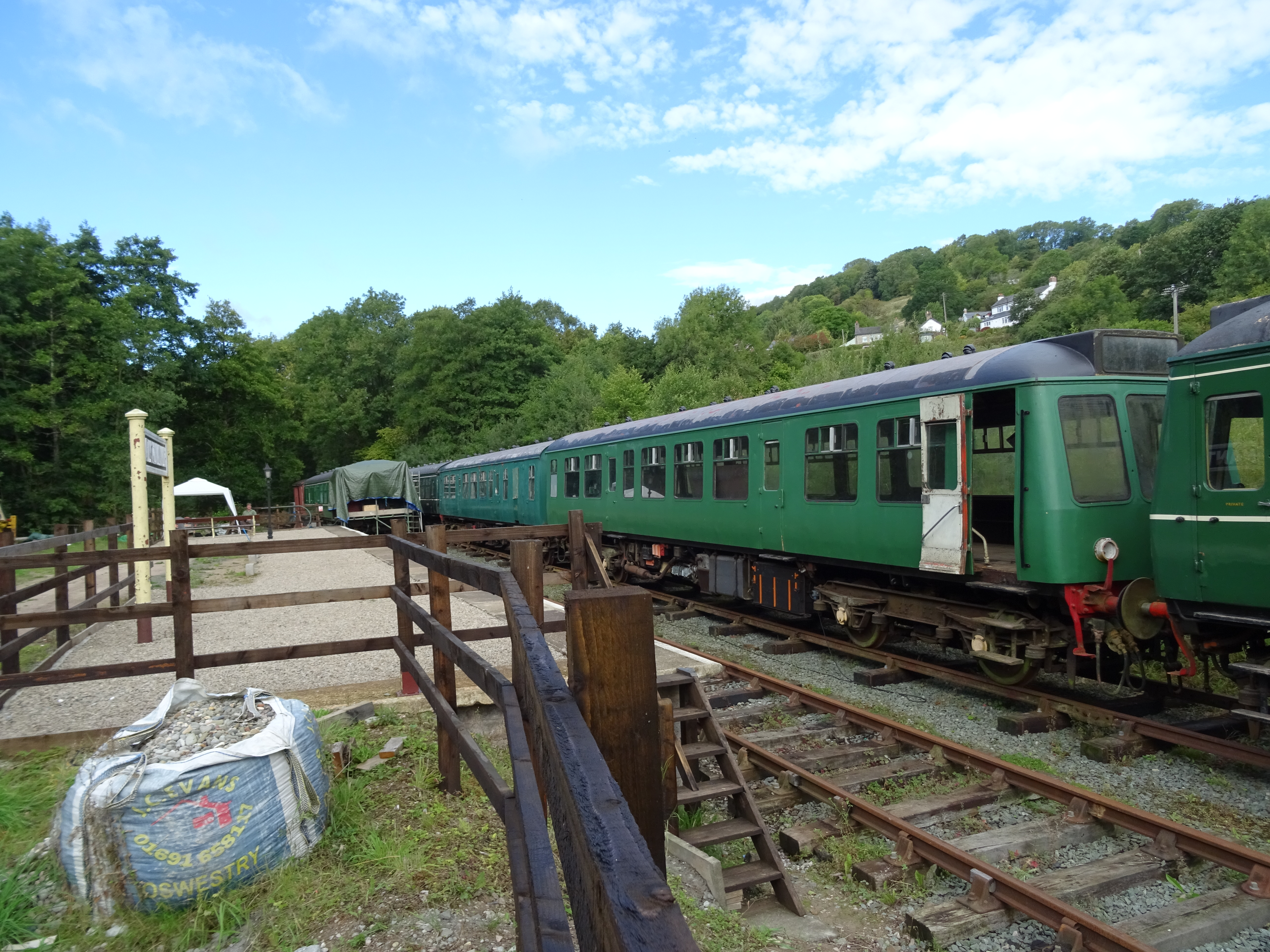
The new permanent platform at Nantmawr.

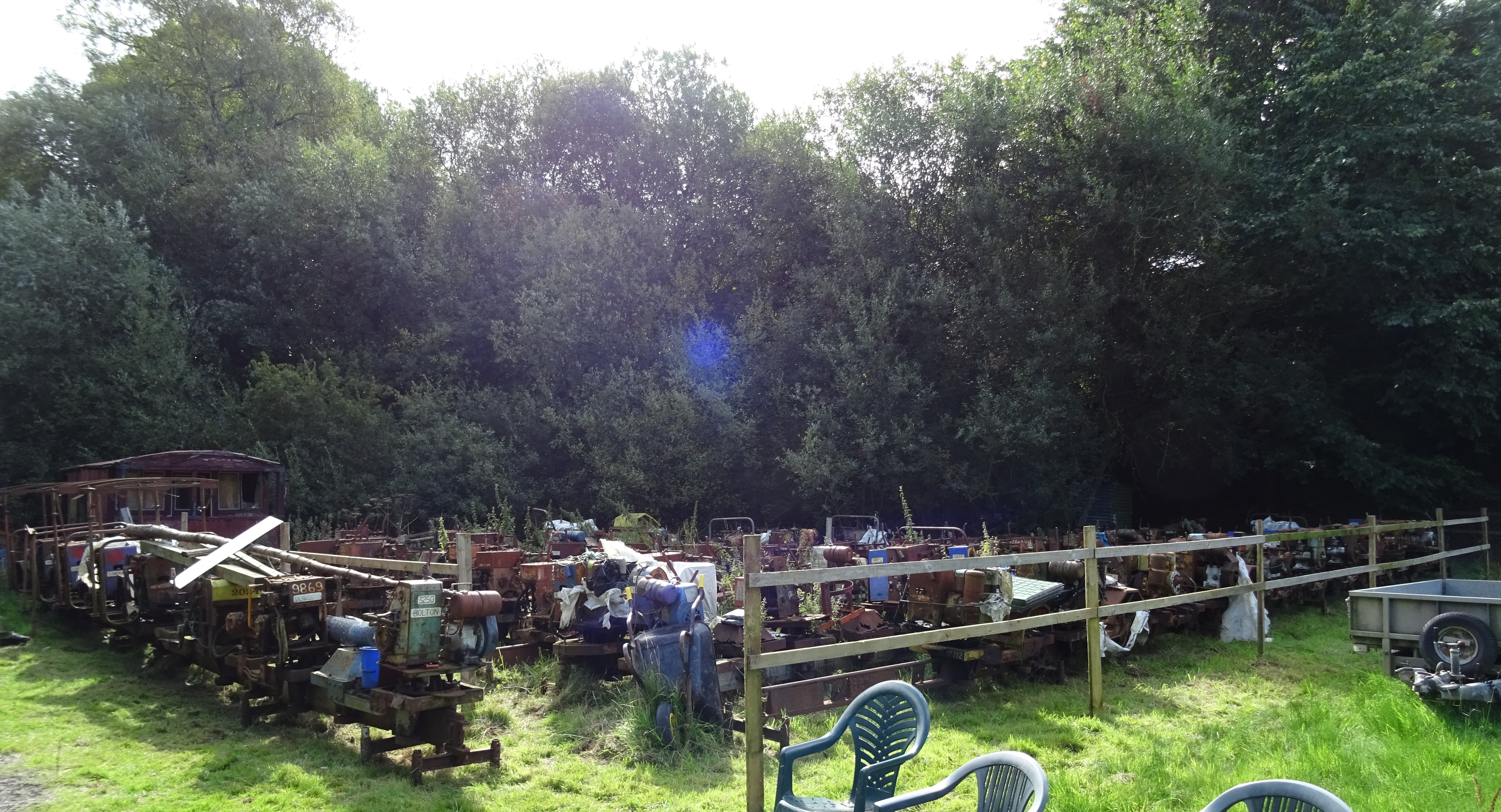
Diesel locomotives for the monorail at Nantmawr.

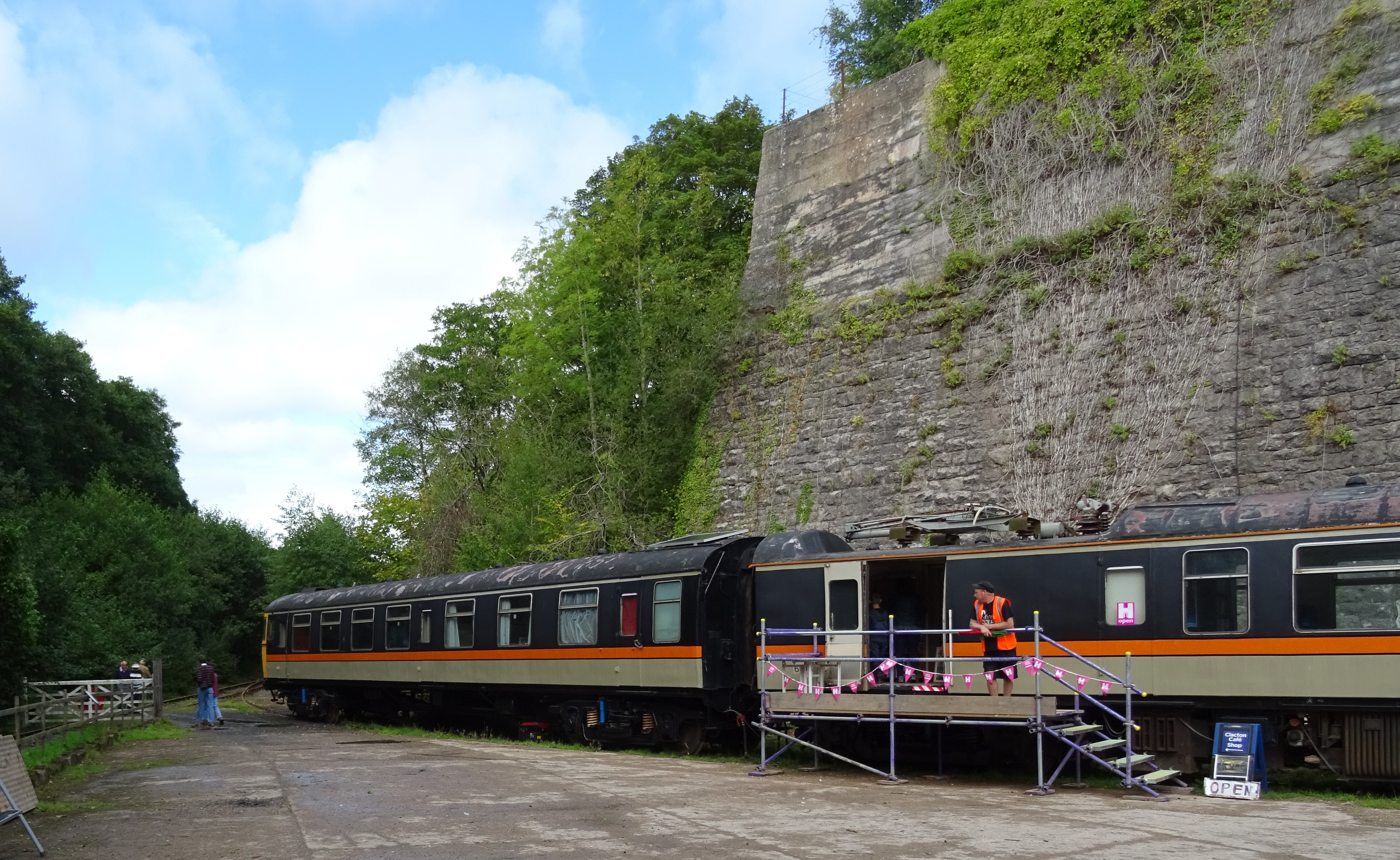
960101 Class 309 static electric multiple unit at Nantmawr on the Heritage Open Days in September 2018.

== Expansions ==
Tanat Valley Light Railway currently have right of passage to run from Nantmawr to Blodwell Junction around the same time that the Cambrian Heritage Railways complete expansion of their Gobowen to Llynclys line via Oswestry. From there north, they plan to reinstate part of the former Tanat Valley Light Railway from Blodwell Junction to Llanrhaeadr-ym-Mochnant as the trackbed is heavily intact and the locals are willing allow them to re-run into the Tanat Valley. North to Llangynog is mostly impassible due to housing at Penybontfawr station site and Llangynog now being a caravan site. This is a long term ambition of the companies. For now, they are focused on reaching Blodwell Junction.
