= Brecknock Rural District =

Former local government area in the UK

Coordinates: 51.947°N 3.391°W

Brecknock
- Area
  - 1901: 189,532 acres (767.0 km^{2})
  - 1961: 189,532 acres (767.0 km^{2})
- Population
  - 1901: 9,758
  - 1971: 6,893
- History
  - Created: 1894
  - Abolished: 1974
  - Succeeded by: Brecknock
- Status: Rural district
  - HQ: Brecon

Brecknock was a rural district in the administrative county of Breconshire, Wales, from 1894 - 1974. The district surrounded, but did not include, the town of Brecon, which was a separate municipal borough.

In 1974, the local government throughout Wales was reorganised. Under the Local Government Act 1972, Brecknock Rural District was abolished and its area was combined with a number of other local government areas to form the Borough of Brecknock, one of three districts of the new county of Powys.

Brecknock Rural District comprised the following civil parishes. They are listed below using the spelling current at the times of the rural district's existence:

- Aberyscir
- Battle
- Cantref
- Cathedine
- Cray
- Garthbrengy
- Glyn
- Glyntawe
- Llanddetty
- Llanddew
- Llandefailog Fach
- Llandeilo'r-Fan
- Llandefalle
- Llanfigan
- Llanfihangel Fechan
- Llanfihangel Nant Bran
- Llanfihangel Tal-y-llyn
- Llanfilo
- Llanfrynach
- Llangasty-Talyllyn
- Llangorse
- Llanhamlach
- Llansaintfraed
- Llanspyddid
- Llanwern
- Maescar
- Merthyr Cynog
- Modrydd
- Penpont
- Senny
- St David Without
- Talachddu
- Traianglâs
- Traianmawr
- Trallong
- Venny Vach
- Ysclydach
