= Cradoc =

Cradoc may refer to:

- Cradoc, Powys, a small village in the United Kingdom
- Cradoc, Tasmania, a small township in Australia
