= Mynydd Llangorse =

Hill (515m) in Powys, Wales

Coordinates: 51.9323°N 3.2248°W

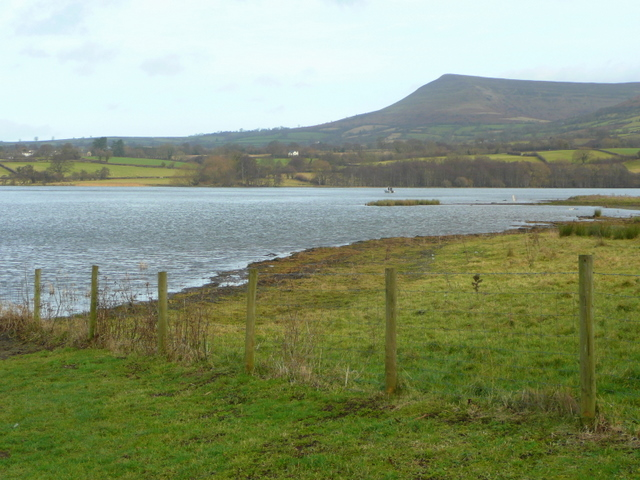
Mynydd Llangorse

Mynydd Llangorse is a mountain on the western edge of the Black Mountains in the Brecon Beacons National Park in Powys, south Wales. It lies two miles east of Llangors and its lake and 5 miles south of Talgarth. Its summit at 515m (1690 feet) overtops the location 600m to the south at which a trig point is sited by 9m. The broad spur of Cefn Moel extends south towards the village of Bwlch whilst a spur to the southeast forms Pen Tir which reaches just over 450m above sea level. It is a Marilyn with a prominence of 161 metres.

== Geology ==
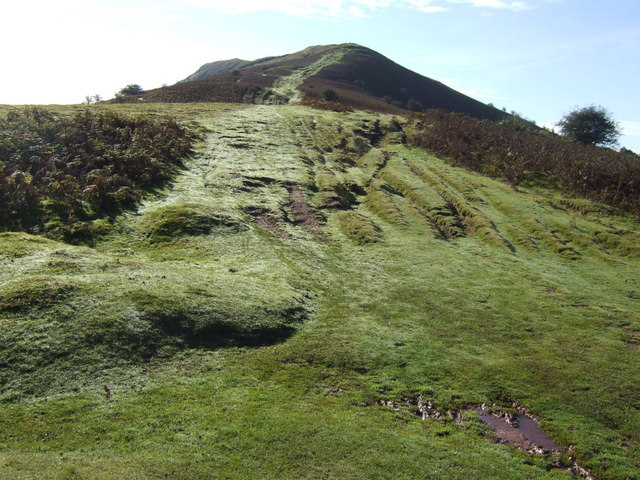
Northern slopes of Mynydd Llangorse

The lower slopes of the hill are formed from mudstones of the St Maughans Formation whilst the upper slopes are formed from sandstones and mudstones of the Senni Beds Formation, both of the Old Red Sandstone which was laid down during the Devonian period. A thin calcrete known as the Ffynnon Limestone occurs at the junction of the two formations in some places. The calcrete and the sandstone have been quarried in various places over the years.

== Access ==
The hill is designated as open country and therefore freely accessible to walkers. Various bridleways run to and over the hill whilst minor roads, 'green lanes' and restricted byways also provide access for horseriders and mountain bikers too. The Beacons Way ascends Cefn Moel from Bwlch before dropping into the cwm en route for the hamlet of Cwmdu in the Rhiangoll valley to the east.
