= Cathedine =

Hamlet in Wales

Coordinates: 51.916514°N 3.245864°W

Cathedine: Welsh: Cathedin
- Location within Powys
- Community: Llangors
- Principal area: Powys
- Preserved county: Powys
- Country: Wales
- Sovereign state: United Kingdom
- Police: Dyfed-Powys
- Fire: Mid and West Wales
- Ambulance: Welsh

Cathedine (Welsh: Cathedin) is a small hamlet that lies between the Brecon Beacons and the Black Mountains, in Powys, Wales. It is an approximately 2 miles from Llangorse and 2 miles from Bwlch, in the community of Llangors.

It has a Norman castle and views of Llangorse Lake.

St Michael's church at Cathedine occupies a rectangular churchyard on a hill slope at the southern end of the hamlet. The church was first recorded at about the beginning of the 12th century, but was almost entirely rebuilt in the second half of the 19th century. Some stonework from the earlier structure may survive specifically the west wall and the jambs of the south door which could be relics from its predecessor.

== History ==
Following the conquest of Brycheiniog by Bernard de Neufmarché in the late 11th century, and its conversion into his Lordship of Brecknock, the whole of Cathedine was initially assigned by him to his prisoner Gwrgan ap Bleddyn, son of the last king of Brycheiniog (Bleddyn ap Maenarch) but was later repossessed by Bernard. From the late 12th century formed part of the medieval Marcher lordship of Blaenllynfi (of which Talgarth was the main town), which eventually came into the possession of Gwrgan's descendant, Rhys ap Hywel (ancestor of Sir Dafydd Gam).

Following Rhys' involvement in the coup against Edward II, Edward III terminated the Lordship of Blaenllynfi, returning the land to Bernard's descendant, the then Marcher Lord of Brecknock. Following the Laws in Wales Act 1535, the Lordship of Brecknock became part of the new county of Brecknockshire, with Cathedine forming part of the hundred of Talgarth, and later formed part of the 19th-century tithe parish of Cathedine.

The hamlet was reputably a favourite country hunting base for the 19th century industrialist, Crawshay Bailey.

== Landscape ==
Predominantly regular fieldscapes with hedged boundaries to the south and east of Llangorse Lake, on sloping hill-land of Allt yr Esgair and the western flanks of Mynydd Llangors, lying between a height of between about 150–390 metres above sea level. The distinctive field patterns in the area appears to represent systematic clearance and enclosure or the enclosure of former common grazing in the later medieval or early post-medieval period. Modern land use predominantly pasture, with some conifer plantation on Allt yr Esgair. Modern settlement includes a number of widely dispersed farms including Trebinshwn farm and house and Lower Cathedine, both of which are perhaps late medieval or early post-medieval in origin.
