= Rhiangoll =

River in Powys, Wales

Coordinates: 51.87596°N 3.17685°W

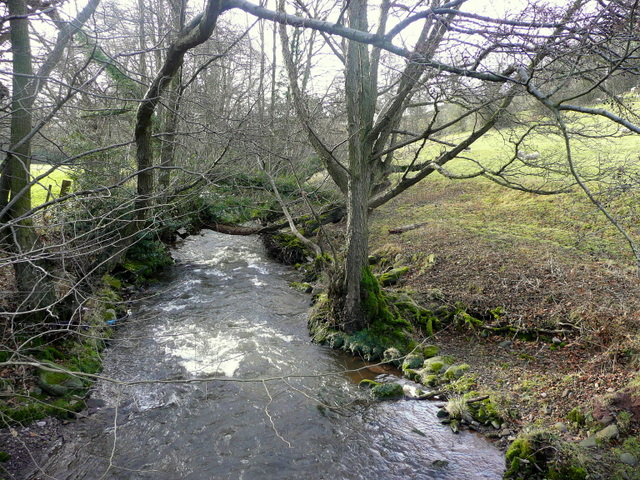
The Rhiangoll north of Cwmdu

The Rhiangoll is a river in the Brecon Beacons National Park in Powys, Wales. It rises on the western slopes of Waun Fach, highest point of the Black Mountains (Welsh: Y Mynyddoedd Duon) and drops steeply down to the west into the north–south valley through which the A479 runs between Talgarth and the hamlet of Tretower and through the village of Cwmdu. It is joined by various minor tributary streams on its left bank including the Ffinnant, Nant yr Ychen, Nant-y-fedw and Nantygarreg, all of which rise on the flanks of the ridge extending between the Pen Trumau spur of Waun Fach and Pen Gloch-y-pibwr. Two tributary streams flowing from Mynydd Troed and Mynydd Llangorse enter on its right bank as does Nant Ewyn east of the village of Bwlch.

The main valley was excavated by glacial ice during the course of the ice ages as it breached the watershed at Pengenffordd. Its broad lower section was influenced by the merging of the Rhiangoll valley ice with that of the main Usk Valley glacier which swept down past Bwlch. The Rhiangoll itself enters the River Usk near Glanusk (or 'Tower') Bridge 1 mile south of Tretower.
