= Talybont-on-Usk railway station =

Former railway station in Wales

Talybont-on-Usk
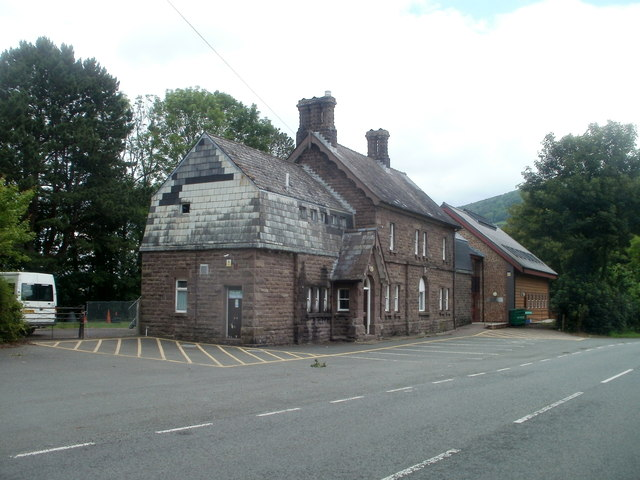
- The site of the station in 2011

General information
- Location: Talybont-on-Usk, Powys; Wales
- Coordinates: 51.8991°N 3.2821°W
- Grid reference: SO117231
- Platforms: 2

Other information
- Status: Disused

History
- Original company: Brecon and Merthyr Railway
- Post-grouping: Great Western Railway

Key dates
- 1863: Opened
- 31 December 1962: Closed
Location

Talybont-on-Usk railway station was a station in Talybont-on-Usk, Powys, Wales. The station was opened in 1863 and closed in 1962.

| Preceding station | Disused railways | Following station |
|---|---|---|
| Llangorse Lake Halt; Line and station closed | Midland Railway; Hereford, Hay and Brecon Railway | Pentir Rhiw; Line and station closed |
| Talyllyn Junction; Line and station closed | Brecon and Merthyr Tydfil Junction Railway; Northern section | Pentir Rhiw; Line and station closed |
