= Cradoc railway station =

Disused railway station in Cradoc, Powys

Cradoc

General information
- Location: Cradoc, Breconshire; Wales
- Coordinates: 51.9630°N 3.4349°W
- Grid reference: SO014303
- Platforms: 1

Other information
- Status: Disused

History
- Original company: Neath and Brecon Railway
- Post-grouping: Great Western Railway

Key dates
- 1 March 1877: Opened
- 15 October 1962: Closed
Location

Cradoc railway station served the village of Cradoc, in the historical county of Breconshire, Wales, from 1877 to 1962 on the Neath and Brecon Railway.

== History ==
The station was opened on 1 March 1877, although it only appeared in Bradshaw in November 1877. It closed on 15 October 1962.

Preceding station	Disused railways	Following station
Brecon Free Street; Line and station closed	Neath and Brecon Railway	Aberbran; Line and station closed
