= Llangorse Mountain =

Mountain in British Columbia, Canada

- Location within British Columbia
- Interactive map of Llangorse Mountain

Highest point
- Elevation: 1,962 m (6,437 ft)
- Prominence: 372 m (1,220 ft)
- Coordinates: 59°23′55″N 132°48′20″W

Geography
- Location: British Columbia, Canada
- District: Cassiar Land District
- Topo map: NTS 104N7 Bell Lake

Geology
- Rock age: Cenozoic
- Volcanic zone: Northern Cordilleran Volcanic Province
- Last eruption: Cenozoic

Llangorse Mountain is a mountain in northern British Columbia, Canada, located 54 km (34 mi) southeast of Atlin on the eastern side of the head of the Gladys River. It is a volcanic feature of the vast Northern Cordilleran Volcanic Province and is the only location of megacrysts made of kaersutite in the volcanic zone.

Llangorse Mountain got its name origin on October 7, 1954 from being near Llangorse Lake, which gets its name from Llangorse Lake, the largest lake in South Wales, which is in turn named for the nearby village of Llangors.

== See also ==
- Volcanism of Canada
- Volcanism of Western Canada
- List of Northern Cordilleran volcanoes
