= Llanfrynach =

Village and community in Powys, Wales

- Village and community
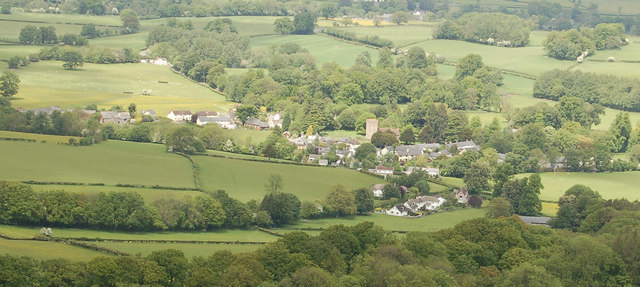
- Llanfrynach

- Location within Powys
- Principal area: Powys
- Country: Wales
- Sovereign state: United Kingdom
- Police: Dyfed-Powys
- Fire: Mid and West Wales
- Ambulance: Welsh
- List of places UK Wales Powys 51°55′N 3°21′W Community map: Map of the community

Llanfrynach is a village and community in the county of Powys, Wales, and the historic county of Brecknockshire.

== Description ==
The population of the community as taken at the 2011 census was 571. It lies just to the southeast of Brecon in the Brecon Beacons National Park. The village sits astride the Nant Menasgin, a right bank tributary of the River Usk. The B4558 road passes just to its north and the Monmouthshire and Brecon Canal also passes around the village. The community includes the hamlets of Llanhamlach and Groesffordd.

The community is included in the Talybont-on-Usk electoral ward, which chooses one county councillor for Powys County Council.

== History ==
The village name signifies a "Llan dedicated to/founded by Saint Brynach". As evidenced by the name and the dedication of the church, the village may have been home to a post-Roman ecclesiastical community founded beside the Nant Menasgin, where several early medieval slabs have been identified. The Welsh language name is first recorded as Lanbernach in 1291, and as Sci Brenaci juxta Brechon in the early fifteenth century before appearing as ll. Frynach around 1566.

The area was home to perhaps the only known Roman villa in Brecknockshire. Samuel Lewis stated that ancient smelting works could still be found in the locality of the village in his time and that these were popularly believed to be Roman in origin. Modern investigations have confirmed and this and further Roman activity was evidenced in 1775 by the discovery of Roman coins and a bath-house with mosaics at Maesderwen.

The Cefn Brynich Canal Bridge Aqueduct over the Usk is a Grade II* listed structure.
