= Brecon Free Street railway station =

Former railway station in Powys, Wales

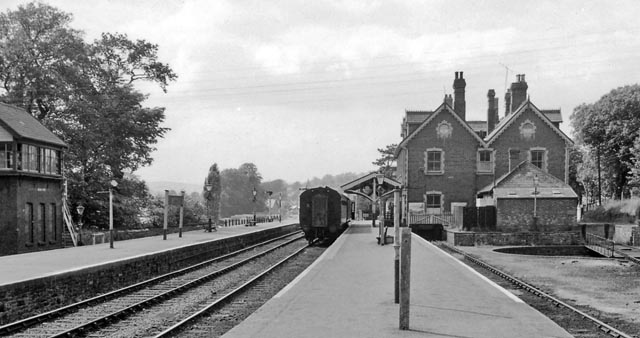
- View westward, towards Neath. Shortly before closure in 1962

General information
- Location: Brecon, Powys; Wales
- Coordinates: 51.9463°N 3.3846°W
- Grid reference: SO049284

Other information
- Status: Disused

History
- Original company: Brecon and Merthyr Tydfil Junction Railway
- Pre-grouping: Brecon and Merthyr Tydfil Junction Railway
- Post-grouping: Great Western Railway

Key dates
- 1 March 1871: Joint station opens
- 31 December 1962: Station closes to passengers
- 4 May 1964: Station closes to goods
Location

Brecon Free Street railway station served Brecon, in the historic Welsh county Brecknockshire, now Powys.

The Brecon and Merthyr Railway (B&MR) obtained an Act of Parliament on 1 August 1859 to construct a line between Talybont and Pant. Train services between Brecon and Pant officially began on 23 April 1863 but two trains per day ran from 19 March 1863 from its first station in Watton. The Neath and Brecon Railway (N&BR) had a temporary station at Brecon Mount Street by 1868, but a joint station was opened at Free Street on 1 March 1871 replacing the two separate stations. Initially used only by the B&MR, trains of the Mid-Wales Railway used Free Street from May 1871, and the N&BR also used the station from 1874.

The line and station finally closed in 1964.

== History ==
The Brecon and Merthyr Tydfil Junction Railway became part of the Great Western Railway during the Grouping of 1923.

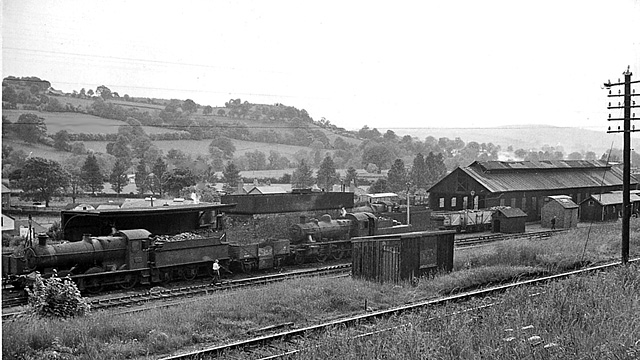
The joint engine shed in June 1962

A special train ran to Free Street on 2 May 1964, named Last Train to Brecon.

The line closed to passengers on 31 December 1962 and to goods on 4 May 1964.

== The site today ==
Heol Gouesnou approximately follows the course of the railway from The Struet to the site of Brecon Free Street station (near the bus station).

Preceding station	Disused railways	Following station
Cradoc; Line and station closed	Neath and Brecon Railway	Terminus
Terminus	Brecon and Merthyr Tydfil Junction Railway; Northern section	Groesffordd Halt; Line and station closed
