= Watton railway station (Wales) =

Former railway station in Powys, Wales

Watton

General information
- Location: Brecon, Powys; Wales
- Coordinates: 51.9434°N 3.3792°W
- Grid reference: SO052281

Other information
- Status: Disused

History
- Original company: Brecon and Merthyr Railway

Key dates
- 1863: Opened
- 1 March 1871: Closed
Location

Watton railway station was a station situated in Brecon, Powys, Wales. The station was opened by the Brecon and Merthyr Railway in 1863. It closed in 1871 when services were diverted to Brecon Free Street railway station.

Preceding station	Disused railways	Following station
Terminus	Brecon and Merthyr Tydfil Junction Railway; Northern section	Talyllyn Junction; Line and station closed
