= Groesffordd Halt railway station =

Former railway station in Powys, Wales

Groesffordd Halt

General information
- Location: Groesffordd, Brecon, Powys; Wales
- Coordinates: 51.9424°N 3.3452°W
- Grid reference: SO075280
- Platforms: 1

Other information
- Status: Disused

History
- Post-grouping: Great Western Railway

Key dates
- 8 September 1934: Opened
- 31 December 1962: Closed
Location

Groesffordd Halt railway station was a station situated to the east of Brecon, Powys, Wales. The station was opened by the Great Western Railway in 1934 and was closed in 1962. The station was demolished after closure, the area covered by a housing development.

Preceding station	Disused railways	Following station
Brecon Free Street; Line and station closed	Great Western Railway; Brecon and Merthyr Tydfil Junction Railway	Talyllyn Junction; Line and station closed
Watton (B&MR); Line and station closed	Great Western Railway; Brecon and Merthyr Tydfil Junction Railway	Talyllyn Junction; Line and station closed
