= Aberbran railway station =

Disused railway station in Aberbran, Powys

Coordinates: 51°57′14.4″N 3°28′50.5″W

Aberbran
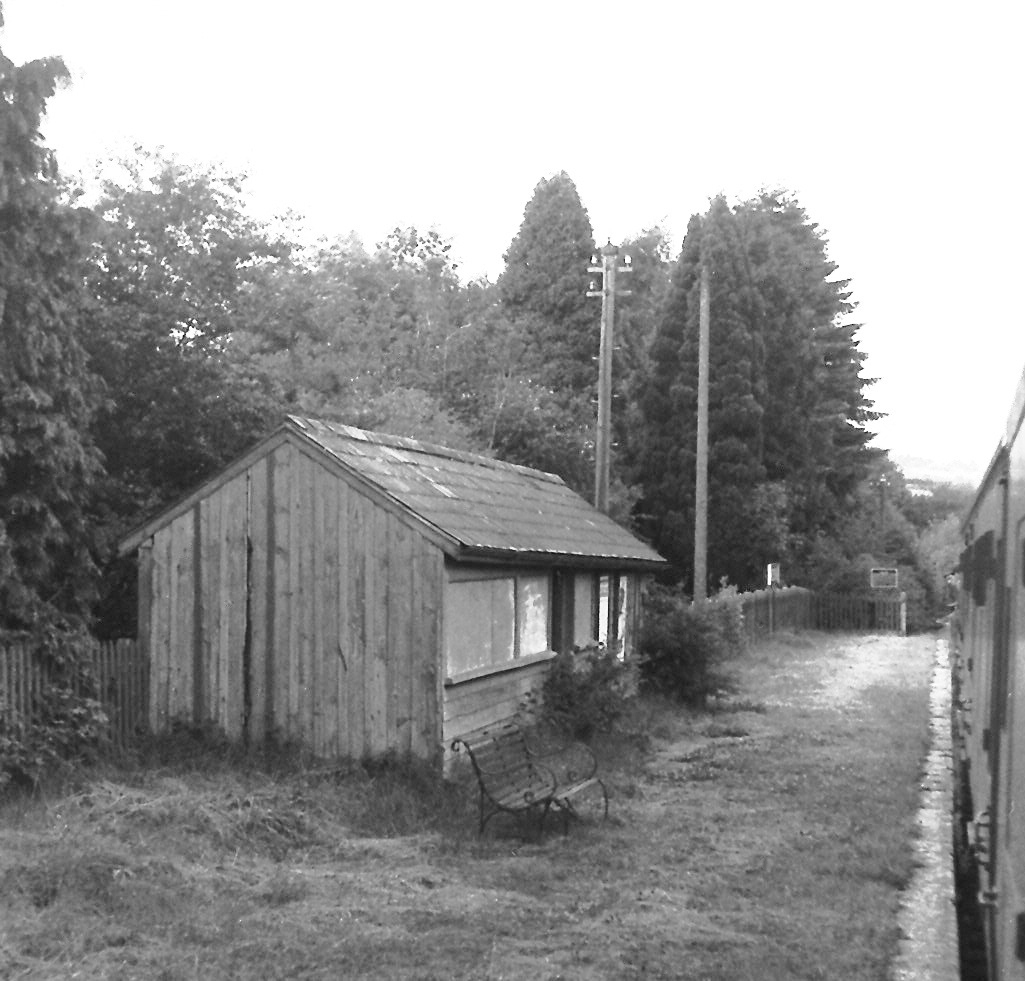
- Aberbran station shortly before closure in 1962

General information
- Location: Aberbran, Powys; Wales
- Platforms: 1

Other information
- Status: Disused

History
- Opened: 14 Sept. 1868
- Original company: Neath and Brecon Railway
- Pre-grouping: Neath and Brecon Railway
- Post-grouping: Great Western Railway

Key dates
- 15 October 1962: Station closes
Location

Aberbran railway station served the village of Aberbran in the traditional county of Brecknockshire, Wales.

== History ==
Opened by the Neath and Brecon Railway, it became part of the Great Western Railway during the Grouping of 1923. The line then passed on to the Western Region of British Railways on nationalisation in 1948. It was then closed by the British Transport Commission.

== The site today ==
The site is now a touring caravan park owned and operated by the Caravan Club.

Preceding station	Disused railways	Following station
Penpont Halt	Great Western Railway; Neath and Brecon Railway	Cradoc
