= Pentir Rhiw railway station =

Former railway station in Wales

Pentir Rhiw

General information
- Location: Talybont Reservoir, Powys; Wales
- Coordinates: 51.8569°N 3.3048°W
- Grid reference: SO101184
- Platforms: 2 (island platform)

Other information
- Status: Disused

History
- Original company: Brecon and Merthyr Railway
- Post-grouping: Great Western Railway

Key dates
- 1909: Opened
- 1962: Closed
Location

Pentir Rhiw railway station (alternatively, Pant-y-rhiw railway station) was a station adjacent to Talybont Reservoir in Powys, Wales. The station was opened in 1909 and closed in 1962. Pentir Rhiw had its own signal box. The station building is now a Royal Navy outdoor training centre.

Preceding station	Disused railways	Following station
Talybont-on-Usk; Line and station closed	Brecon and Merthyr Tydfil Junction Railway; Northern section	Torpantau; Line and station closed
