= Woodstock, Tasmania =

Woodstock
- Town
- Coordinates: 43°04′43″S 147°02′30″E
- Country: Australia
- State: Tasmania
- Region: South-east
- LGA: Huon Valley
- Location: 7 km (4.3 mi) SW of Huonville

Government
  - State electorate: Franklin
  - Federal division: Franklin

Population
  - Total: 33 (2016 census)
- Postcode: 7109
Localities around Woodstock
Huon River	Huonville	Huonville
Huon River	Woodstock	Upper Woodstock, Cradoc
Huon River	Cradoc	Cradoc

Woodstock is a rural locality in the local government area of Huon Valley in the South-east region of Tasmania. It is located about 7 kilometres (4.3 mi) south-west of the town of Huonville. The 2016 census recorded a population of 33 for the state suburb of Woodstock.

== History ==
Woodstock was gazetted as a locality in 1968.

== Geography ==
The Huon River forms the western boundary.

== Road infrastructure ==
The B68 route (Channel Highway) enters from the north-west and runs along the Huon River to the south-west, where it exits. Route C621 (Pelverata Road) starts at an intersection with B68 in the centre and runs east through the locality until it exits.
