= Llanhamlach =

Rural village in Wales

Coordinates: 51.9279°N 3.3235°W

Llanhamlach: Welsh: Llanhamlach
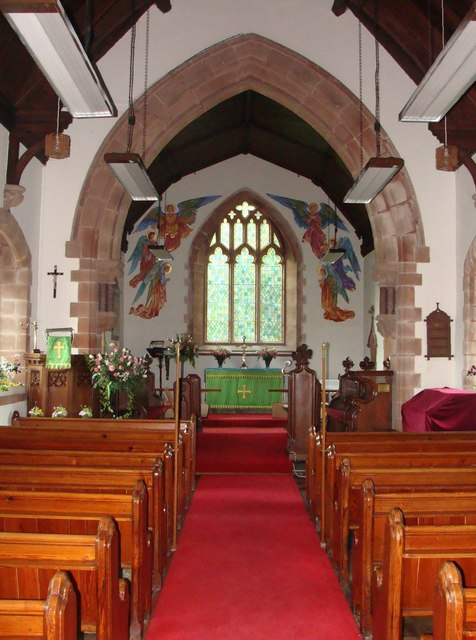
- Interior of the church of St.Peter and St. Illtyd

- Location within Powys
- OS grid reference: SO0826
- Principal area: Powys
- Preserved county: Powys
- Country: Wales
- Sovereign state: United Kingdom
- Post town: BRECON
- Postcode district: LD
- Dialling code: 01874
- Police: Dyfed-Powys
- Fire: Mid and West Wales
- Ambulance: Welsh
- UK Parliament: Brecon, Radnor and Cwm Tawe
- Senedd Cymru – Welsh Parliament: Brecon & Radnorshire

Llanhamlach is a village in rural Powys, Wales about 4 miles east of Brecon, in the community of Llanfrynach. It had a railway junction called Talyllyn Junction.

== History ==
Previously part of Brecknock Rural District, Llanhamlach was in the county of Brecknockshire before becoming part of Powys. A standing stone, called the Peterstone, is along the course of a suspected Roman Road.

== Church ==
There is a church dedicated to the saints Peter and Illtyd, which is noted for an early medieval carving of two exhibitionist figures.
