= Bwlch =

Coordinates: 51.890°N 3.237°W

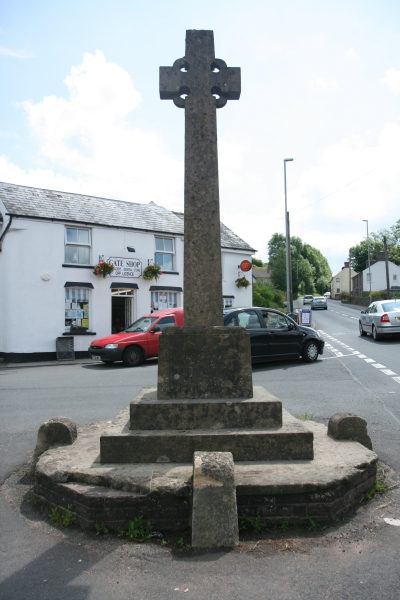
- Bwlch War Memorial

- Location within Powys
- Population: 1,026 (Llanfihangel Cwmdu with Bwlch and Cathedine) (2011)
- OS grid reference: SO150220
- Community: Cwmdu and District
- Principal area: Powys
- Preserved county: Powys
- Country: Wales
- Sovereign state: United Kingdom
- Post town: Brecon
- Postcode district: LD3
- Police: Dyfed-Powys
- Fire: Mid and West Wales
- Ambulance: Welsh
- UK Parliament: Brecon, Radnor and Cwm Tawe
- Senedd Cymru – Welsh Parliament: Brecon & Radnorshire

Bwlch (Welsh for 'a pass') (Welsh pronunciation: [ˈbʊlχ]) is a village and an electoral ward in the community of Cwmdu and District, Powys, south Wales. The settlement is strung out along the A40 road which crosses a low col above the Usk Valley at this point on its route between Brecon and Crickhowell.

== Geography ==
The village is about 1.1 miles (1.8 km) north of the River Usk and about 100 metres above the floor of the Usk Valley at around 200 metres (660 ft) above sea level. The geographical feature from which it derives its name separates the rolling moorland of Cefn Moel and Mynydd Llangorse in the northeast from Buckland Hill to the southwest. Various parts of the village command panoramic views across the Rhiangoll valley to the south-western flanks of the Black Mountains, west to the Brecon Beacons and south to Mynydd Llangynidr and Mynydd Llangatwg. About 2 miles (3 km) to the northwest is the hill of Allt yr Esgair (commonly referred to locally as 'The Allt') whilst 3 miles (5 km) to the southwest is Tor y Foel. Llangorse Lake and the village of Llangors are 3 miles (5 km) to the north, Talybont-on-Usk is around 2 miles (3 km) to the west. The nearest town is Crickhowell, some 5 miles (8 km) to the east down the Usk Valley.

== History ==
The remains of a defensive enclosure on the slopes of Cefn Moel to the north of the village date from prehistoric times. There is also a standing stone of unknown origin and purpose set alone in a field within the hairpin of the A40 road. A further standing stone of similarly unknown age is found at Llygad Wy on the slopes dropping down eastwards below the A40. Rising from the Roman auxiliary fort at Pen-y-gaer, east of the village, the Romans constructed a road between Abergavenny and Brecon which passed through the col before crossing the slopes of Allt yr Esgair. The pass was formerly known as Bwlch'r Allwys and was once guarded by Blaenllynfi Castle, a Norman castle, now a ruin. Three miles to the east are Tretower Castle and Tretower Court, now in the care of Cadw. The Calvinistic Methodist and English Presbyterian chapel of Penuel was first built in 1817, though the modern building dates from 1874. It no longer operates as a church. The 19th-century All Saints Church on the south side of the A40 also no longer holds services.

== Amenities ==
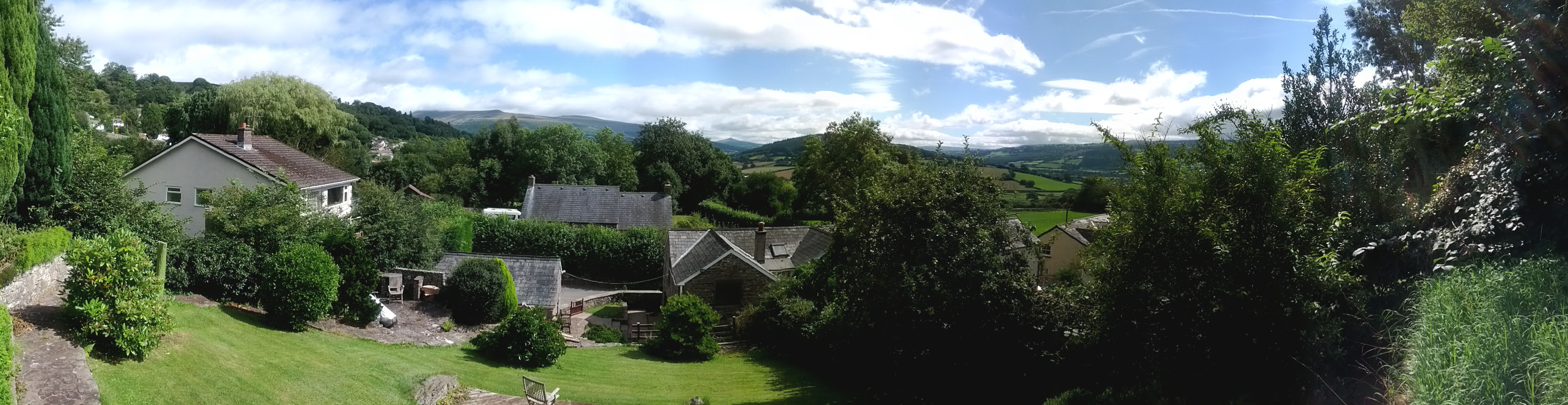
Looking east from Bwlch, down the Usk Valley towards Crickhowell

Most of the business received locally is due to tourists, with holiday accommodation being plentiful. The area is very popular for hillwalking, cycling and horseriding. The village still has a village hall, but no longer has a shop or post office. In the late 1990s Bwlch had three public houses but now there is only one bunkhouse, and one backpackers which is also a full-time village pub. There is a small park with four pieces of play equipment. The Beacons Way long-distance footpath passes through Bwlch.

== Transport ==
Bwlch is situated on the main A40 trunk road and as such is readily accessible even during poor weather, from both Brecon and Abergavenny. The X43 bus service runs between these towns each day. Each bus stop has been fitted with electronic timetables to assist residents and visitors Note the 43 service does not run through Bwlch, just the X43. The bus connects with trains from Hereford and Cardiff at Abergavenny, and with Traws Cambria bus service in Brecon.
