= Upper Woodstock, Tasmania =

Upper Woodstock Tasmania
- Coordinates: 43°04′53″S 147°04′33″E
- Population: 66 (SAL 2021)
- Postcode(s): 7150
- Location: 9 km (6 mi) S of Huonville
- LGA(s): Huon Valley
- Region: South-east
- State electorate(s): Franklin
- Federal division(s): Franklin
Localities around Upper Woodstock:
Huonville	Pelverata	Pelverata
Woodstock	Upper Woodstock	Pelverata
Cradoc	Cygnet	Cygnet

Upper Woodstock is a rural locality in the local government area (LGA) of Huon Valley in the South-east LGA region of Tasmania. The locality is about 9 kilometres (5.6 mi) south of the town of Huonville.

== History ==
Upper Woodstock was gazetted as a locality in 1971.

The 2016 census recorded a population of 71 for the state suburb of Upper Woodstock. At the 2021 census, the population had dropped to 66.

== Geography ==
Most of the boundaries are survey lines.

== Road infrastructure ==
Route C621 (Pelverata Road) runs through from north-west to north.
