= Talyllyn Junction railway station =

Former railway station in Powys, Wales

Talyllyn Junction
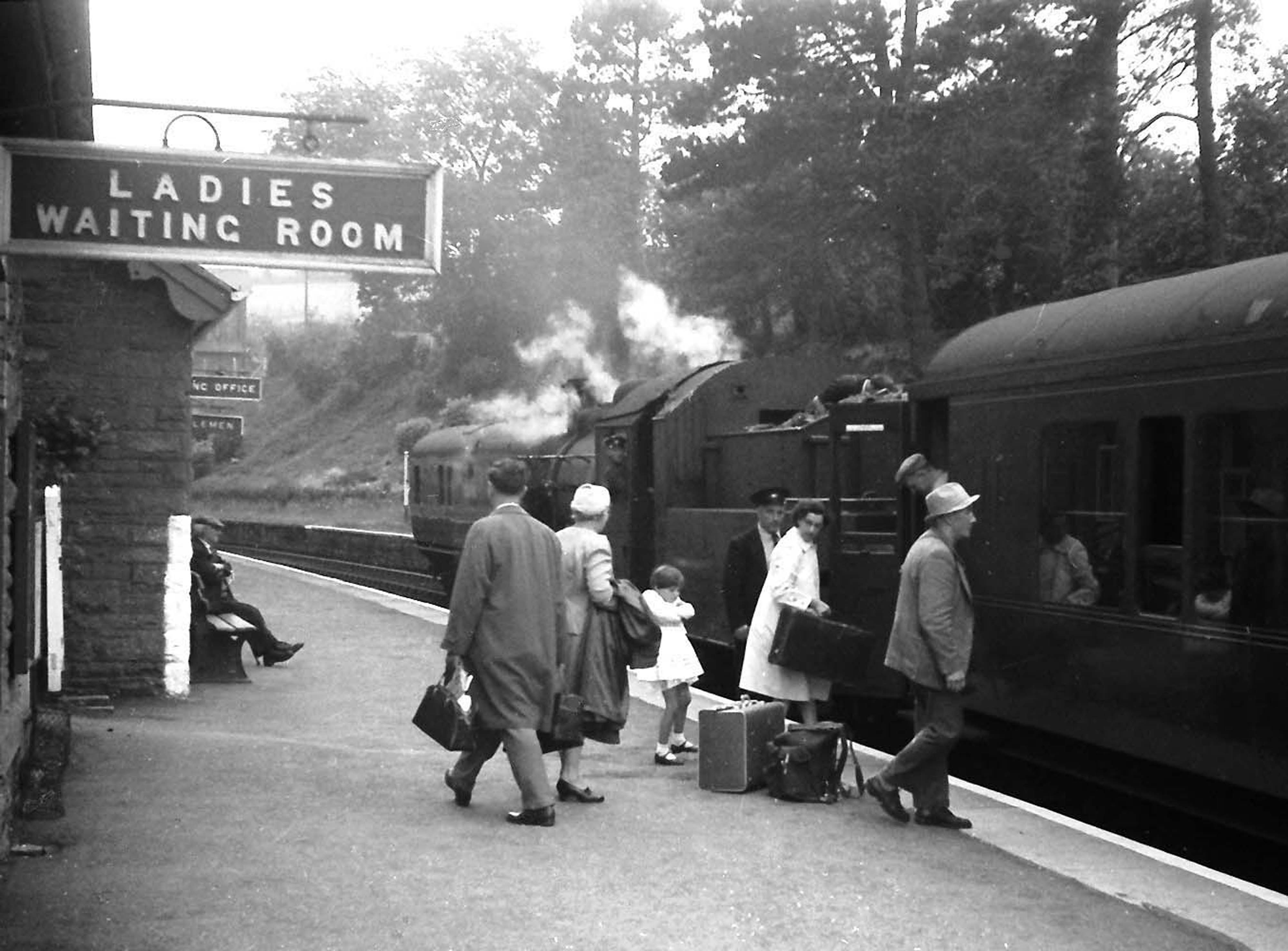
- Changing trains at Talyllyn, shortly before the line closed

General information
- Location: Llanhamlach, Powys; Wales
- Coordinates: 51.9380°N 3.2996°W
- Grid reference: SO106274
- Platforms: 2

Other information
- Status: Disused

History
- Original company: Brecon and Merthyr Railway
- Post-grouping: Great Western Railway

Key dates
- 1869: Opened
- 1962: Closed
Location

Talyllyn Junction was a railway junction located 4 mi (6.4 km) east of Brecon, Powys, opened in 1869. The junction was triangular, with north, east and west chords, station platforms being sited at the western junction and also, until 1878, at the eastern junction. The Junction took its name from the adjacent tiny hamlet.

The junction was created where the Brecon and Merthyr Railway from the south met the Mid-Wales Railway from the north-east. Both railways were to serve Brecon, and to achieve this the latter had running powers over the former from Talyllyn into Brecon. The eastern spur of the triangle permitted through running from South Wales to mid-Wales and also to Hereford.

The northern side of the triangle followed the course of the 1816 Hay Railway, a tram-road worked by horses connecting the town of Hay with the Brecknock and Abergavenny Canal at Brecon. At the western end lay a tunnel which required widening and deepening for use by standard gauge trains.

Talyllyn Junction is often quoted as a defining feature of the Great Western Railway in Wales, namely its inheritance of junctions in unlikely and inconvenient locations. Other examples are Moat Lane Junction, Dovey Junction, Afon Wen and Barmouth Junction (renamed Morfa Mawddach in 1960).

All the railways at Talyllyn Junction were closed to passengers in 1962.

Preceding station	Disused railways	Following station
Groesffordd Halt; Line and station closed	Cambrian Railways; Mid-Wales Railway	Llangorse Lake Halt; Line and station closed
Groesffordd Halt; Line and station closed	Brecon and Merthyr Tydfil Junction Railway; Northern section	Talybont-on-Usk; Line and station closed
