= Cradoc, Tasmania =

Cradoc
- Town
- Coordinates: 43°06′29″S 147°01′59″E
- Country: Australia
- State: Tasmania
- Region: South-east
- LGA: Huon Valley
- Location: 11 km (6.8 mi) SW of Huonville

Government
  - State electorate: Franklin
  - Federal division: Franklin

Population
  - Total: 445 (2016 census)
- Postcode: 7109
Localities around Cradoc
Huon River	Woodstock, Upper Woodstock	Upper Woodstock
Huon River	Cradoc	Cygnet, Upper Woodstock
Huon River	Glaziers Bay, Cygnet	Cygnet

Cradoc is a rural residential locality in the local government area of Huon Valley in the South-east region of Tasmania. It is located about 11 kilometres (6.8 mi) south-west of the town of Huonville. The 2016 census recorded a population of 445 for the state suburb of Cradoc.

== History ==
Cradoc was gazetted as a locality in 1968.

In 1792 Rear Admiral Antoine Raymond Joseph de Bruni D’Entrecasteaux was a French navigator, commissioned to search for La Perouse's lost expedition, and explore our southern coastline. La Perouse had sailed from Botany Bay in 1788 and disappeared. In April 1792 D’Entrecasteaux sailing the Recherche, with Captain Huon de Kermadec sailing the L’Esperance, put down in a bay and named it Recherche after his frigate. Captain Huon de Kermadec's Senior Officer was Cradoc. Cradoc was named after this Senior Officer. The expedition which reached the Derwent estuary, resulting in the naming of the channel, North West Bay, Bruny Island, Port Esperance, Southport, Huon River and Huon Island, and many others including the Derwent River, named ‘Riviere du Nord’. Some months later Englishman Captain John Hayes sailed the channel and renamed many sites including the Derwent. [‘Looking for La Perouse’ book by Frank Horner].

The locality was not named after the town of Cradoc in Wales. Cradoc has been part of a major fruit growing region in south eastern Tasmania since the late 19th century. A significant pioneer of the district was James Rowe, who operated sailing vessels and later steamships to carry fruit and passengers between the Huon districts and Hobart.

== Geography ==
The Huon River forms the western boundary.

== Road infrastructure ==
The B68 route (Channel Highway) enters from the north-west and runs through to the south-east, where it exits. Route C639 (Cygnet Coast Road) starts at an intersection with B68 in the centre and runs west and south through the locality until it exits.
