= Cwmdu, Powys =

Village in Powys, Wales

Coordinates: 51°54′14″N 3°11′37″W

Cwmdu
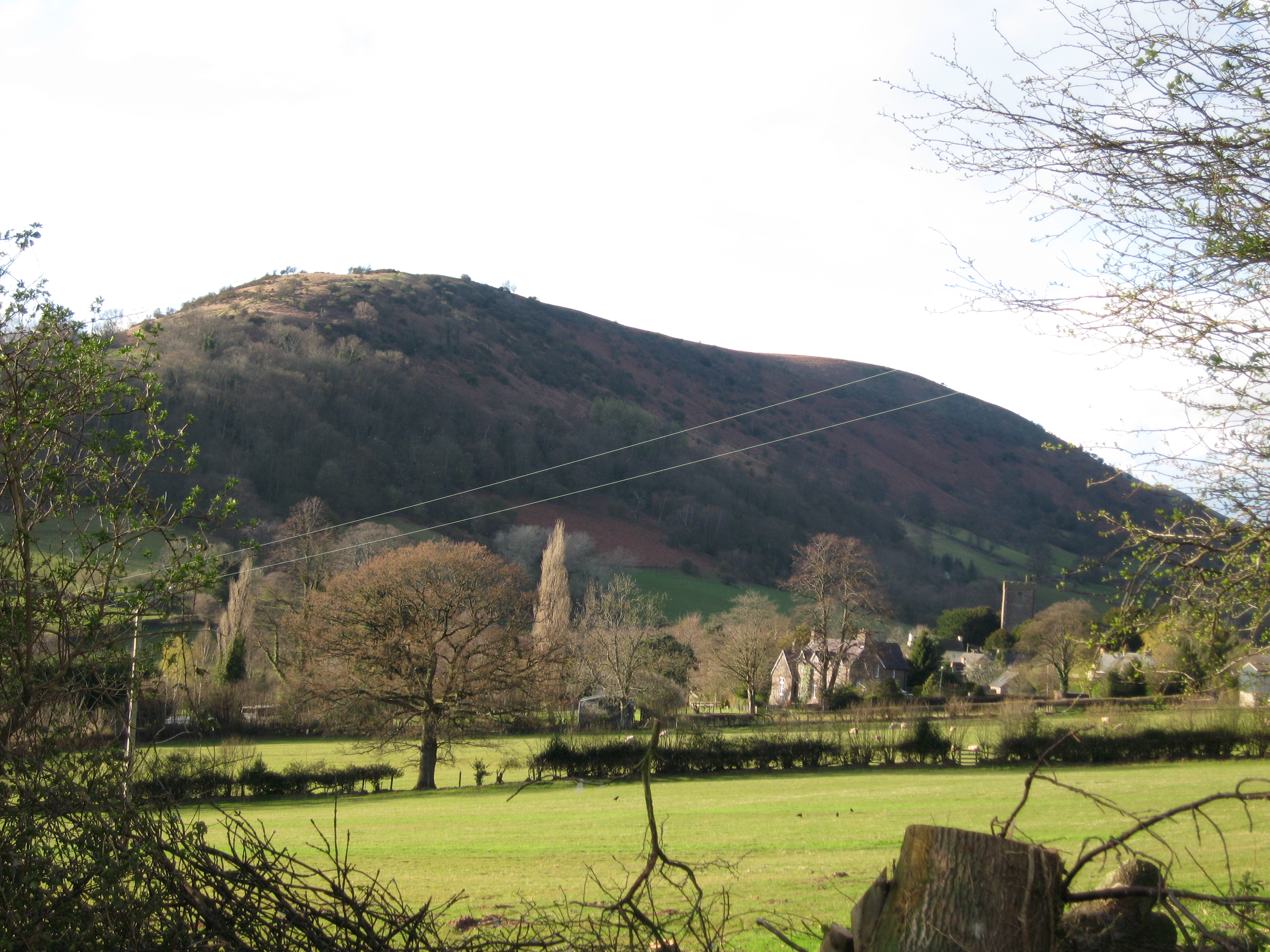
- A picture of Cwmdu, Powys (South Wales) from the campsite. In the picture you can see the school and the church

- Location within Powys
- Community: Cwmdu and District
- Principal area: Powys
- Country: Wales
- Sovereign state: United Kingdom
- Police: Dyfed-Powys
- Fire: Mid and West Wales
- Ambulance: Welsh

Cwmdu (Welsh pronunciation: [kʊmˈdiː]) or Llanfihangel Cwmdu is a small village in the community of Cwmdu and District, situated in the heart of the Black Mountains in Powys, Wales. Its name is derived from the Welsh language "Cwm Du", which means 'Black Valley'. It is located on the A479 Talgarth to Tretower road. Nearby towns include Crickhowell and Abergavenny. The population of the community, Llanfihangel Cwmdu with Bwlch and Cathedine, which includes Cwmdu and nearby villages Bwlch, and Tretower. Cathedine is actually in the neighbouring community of Llangors. as of the 2011 UK Census was 1026. It is in the historic county of Brecknockshire.

== Amenities ==
Cwmdu has several public facilities, including a park, a village pub, the Farmers Arms and a cafe, the Mynydd-Ddu Tea Room.

Its former primary school, which opened in 1873 and was visited by Prince Charles in 2006, closed in 2012 and the building now contains an art gallery.

Cwmdu attracts many tourists every year, who mainly consist of hikers hillwalking through on the Beacons Way. Cwmdu is an attractive hiking destination as it is situated in the heart of the Black Mountains, and is only about 12 miles away from Pen-Y-Fan; the highest mountain range in South Wales and within the region's National Park.

The Church of the Archangel Michael is a grade II* listed building, largely rebuilt in 1830.

In September 2012 Cwmdu was the site for the bi-annual AstroCamp. This saw a large gathering of astronomers and was televised by the BBC The Sky at Night programme the following October.
