= Allt yr Esgair =

Hill (392.6m) in Powys, Wales

Coordinates: 51.9111°N 3.2720°W

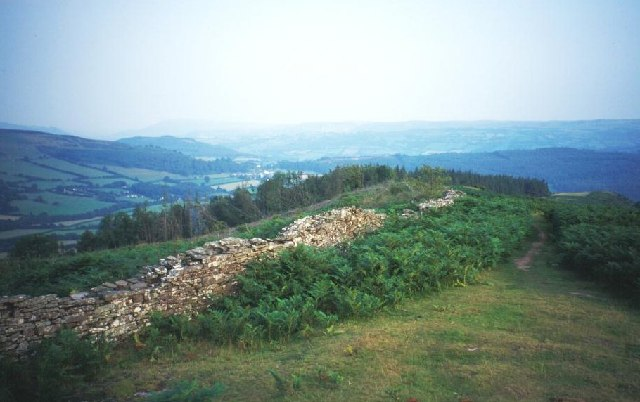
Summit of Allt yr Esgair

Allt yr Esgair is a hill in the Brecon Beacons National Park in Powys, Wales. It is commonly referred to locally as simply 'The Allt'. The Welsh name signifies 'wooded slope of the ridge'. It takes the form of a northwest-southeast aligned ridge which rises to a height of 393m (1289 feet) and which overlooks the valley of the River Usk to the west and south. To the northeast are panoramic views across Llangorse Lake to the Black Mountains There is a viewfinder on the summit erected as a monument to Eirene Lloyd White, Baroness White of Rhymney. It is a Marilyn with a prominence of 199 metres (653 feet).

== Geology ==
The hill is formed from sandstones and mudstones of the Senni Formation (formerly the Senni Beds) of the Old Red Sandstone laid down during the Devonian period. The lower slopes are formed from mudstones and sandstones of the slightly older St. Maughans Formation. A number of small sandstone quarries, now disused, adorn the slopes. The hill probably stood out above the Usk Valley glacier ice during the ice age. At a late stage in de-glaciation, the cols at either end of the ridge at the villages of Pennorth and Bwlch are believed to have conveyed water from a greatly enlarged Llangorse Lake into the Usk catchment.

== Access ==
Several bridleways run along the length of the hill giving access to walker, horseriders and mountain-bikers. The summit area and the woodland to the northeast are open access for walkers. A car park off the A40 road immediately south of the hill provides a convenient starting point for many walkers.

== Archaeology ==
Allt yr Esgair's summit is crowned by an Iron Age hillfort, one of several in the Usk Valley.

The Roman road between the Roman fort of CICVCIVM at Y Gaer, Brecon and Gobannium at Abergavenny runs along the ridge and is followed by a modern-day bridleway.

== See also ==
- List of hillforts in Wales
