= Buckland Hill =

Hill in Powys, Wales

Coordinates: 51.883°N 3.251°W

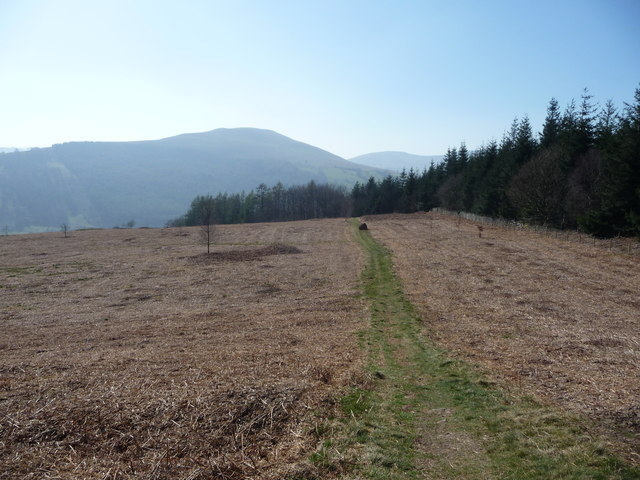
Path on Buckland Hill

Buckland Hill is a low hill in the Brecon Beacons National Park in the county of Powys in Wales. Sitting transversely across the Usk valley between the river and the village of Bwlch, it provides excellent panoramic views down the valley and across to the Black Mountains. The summit at 316m above sea level is marked by an OS trig point though this is now within a dense conifer plantation and so no longer affords any outward views. Buckland Hall sits at the foot of the hill's afforested northwestern side.

== Geology ==
The upper parts of the hill are formed from sandstones and mudstones of the Brownstones Formation of the Old Red Sandstone laid down during the lower Devonian Period. Small outcrops of this sandstone have been quarried on the hills northeastern flanks. The lower slopes are formed in the slightly older sandstones of the Senni Formation.

== Access ==
The eastern slopes of the hill are crossed hy a handful of public footpaths whilst parts are mapped as open country and therefore available for walkers to roam at will. Minor public roads gives access from the village.
