= Aberbrân =

Coordinates: 51.9551°N 03.4801°W

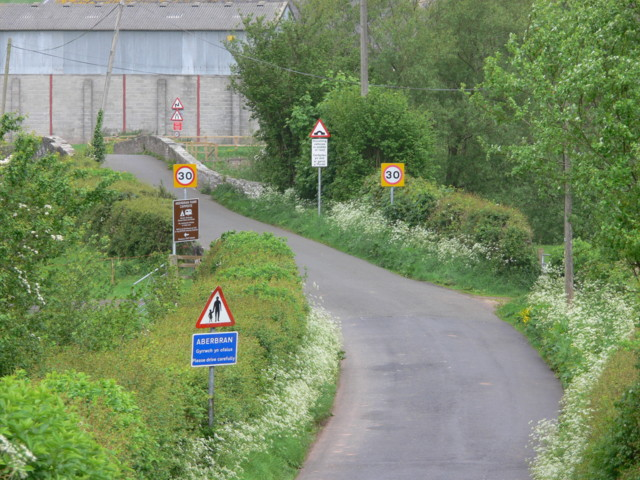
- Bridge over the River Usk

- Location within Powys
- OS grid reference: SN9829
- Principal area: Powys
- Preserved county: Powys
- Country: Wales
- Sovereign state: United Kingdom
- Police: Dyfed-Powys
- Fire: Mid and West Wales
- Ambulance: Welsh
- UK Parliament: Brecon, Radnor and Cwm Tawe
- Senedd Cymru – Welsh Parliament: Brecon and Radnorshire

Aberbrân is a small settlement in Powys, Wales. It lies on the Afon Brân immediately above its confluence (Welsh 'aber') with the River Usk and is 7 kilometres (4 mi) west of the town of Brecon, 35 miles (56 km) from Cardiff and 147 miles (236 km) from London. Aberbrân translates from the Welsh language to English as: mouth of the river (aber) crow (brân).

Though a small settlement, Aberbrân once possessed a railway station and a flour mill; both were closed in the 1950s. The railway station was shut down when the Western Region of British Rail closed the Neath and Brecon Railway line due to a lack of passenger usage. The flour mill closed after the miller got caught up in the machinery and was killed. The mill has now been converted into a house. The majority of the working population are commuters working outside Aberbrân, mainly in the closest market town of Brecon.

Today Aberbrân consists of around 15 houses and two farms which both offer B & B, caravan and camping parks. It also has a post and telephone box and a twice-daily bus service. One of the farms, Aberbrân Fawr also has a successful fruit PYO business, which is well known in the Brecon area. A third caravan park owned by the Caravan Club opened in 1967 on the site of the old train station.

Aber-brân Bridge is a grade II listed structure over the River Usk dating from 1791. It is a recognised starting point for canoeists and fishermen. There are also two other bridges that cross the River Bran.

== See also ==
- Aberbran railway station
