= Llanfihangel Talyllyn =

Village in Powys, Wales

Coordinates: 51.9464°N 3.2910°W

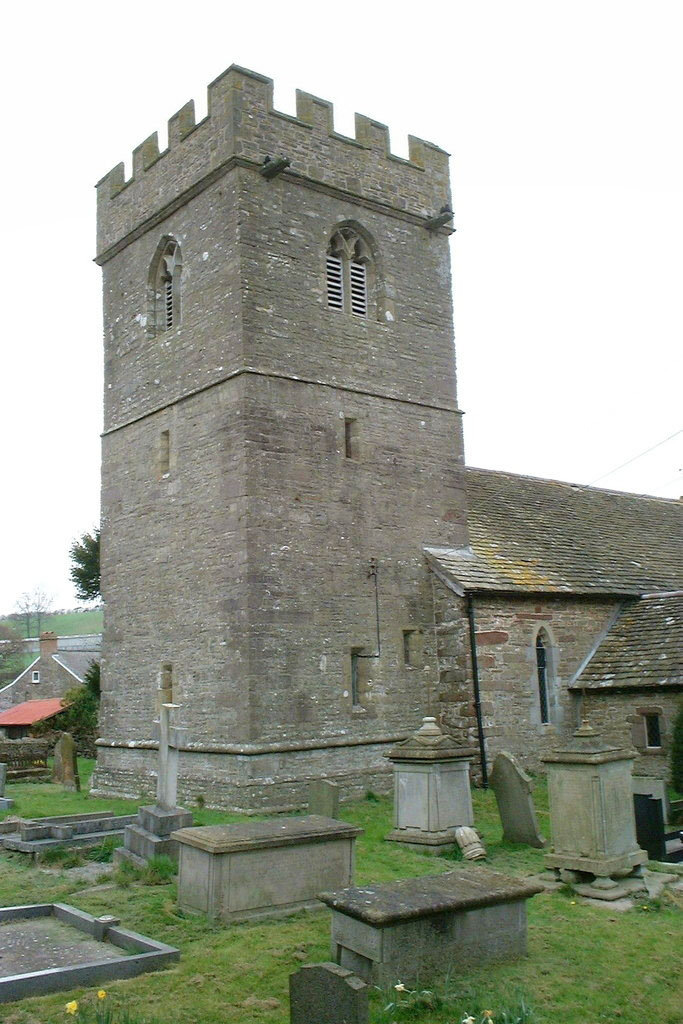
St Michael's church

Llanfihangel Talyllyn is a small village in the community of Llangors in Powys (previously Brecknockshire), Wales. It is also a community electoral ward for Llangors Community Council.

== Description ==
Llanfihangel Talyllyn has a church, a village hall and a public house, The Black Cock.

The church of St Michael and All Angels is located at the centre of the village and dates from the Norman period. The tower and porch date from the 15th century. The church was restored and partially rebuilt in the 1870s.

A school was built in the village in 1860, though subsequently converted for residential use. The village population had jumped from 149 to 213 between 1861 and 1871, probably because of people moving there to work on the nearby railway. By 1901 the population of the parish was 257.

The Black Cock Inn is located next to the church. Its name (though referring to a black cockerel) has been misinterpreted as offensive and, in the run-up to Christmas 2015, its Facebook page was blocked due to "racist or offensive language" It has been called The Black Cock since 1840.

== Governance ==
The village is in the electoral ward of Llangors for elections to Powys County Council.

Llanfihangel Talyllyn is a community ward for Llangors Community Council, electing or co-opting up to half of the ten community councillors.
