= Cradoc, Powys =

Coordinates: 51.965°N 3.432°W

Cradoc is a small village, about two miles northwest of Brecon, Wales. It lies within the administrative community of Yscir and partly within the Brecon Beacons National Park. Its principal attractions are Cradoc Golf Course and the nearby hill of Pen-y-crug topped by an impressive Iron Age hillfort.
