= Llangors =

- Location within Powys
- Population: 1,080 (2011)
- OS grid reference: SO134275
- Principal area: Powys
- Preserved county: Powys
- Country: Wales
- Sovereign state: United Kingdom
- Post town: BRECON
- Postcode district: LD3
- Dialling code: 01874
- Police: Dyfed-Powys
- Fire: Mid and West Wales
- Ambulance: Welsh
- UK Parliament: Brecon, Radnor and Cwm Tawe
- Website: llangors.org.uk
- List of places UK Wales Powys 51.93924°N 3.26115°W Community map: Map of the community

Llangors (also known as Llangorse) is a small village, community and electoral ward in southern Powys, in the historic county of Brecknockshire, within the Brecon Beacons National Park.

== Description ==
Llangors lies a few miles east of Brecon, between Bwlch and Talgarth on the B4560, just off the A40, and is home to the largest natural lake in southern Wales, Llangorse Lake. Nant Cwy, a small stream, runs through the village before emptying into the lake.

Llangors is a popular tourist destination with a variety of activities: boating, canoeing, sailing, windsurfing, coarse fishing, bird watching, pony trekking, hill walking and indoor climbing.

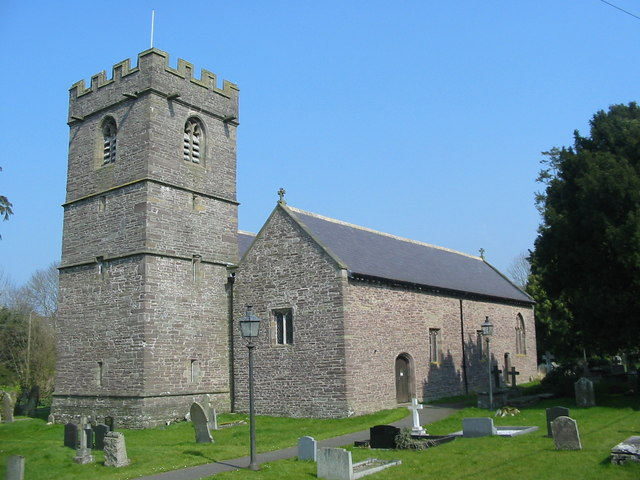
St Paulinus' church

There has been a long history of settlement at Llangorse. A dug-out canoe dating from around AD 800 was found in 1925 and is now on display in Brecon Museum. The church, St Paulinus, dates back to the 15th century, but the font has been dated to around 1300 and the earliest records of a church building on the site date back to 1121.

Today the village has a primary school which serves a number of surrounding villages, a community centre, and two pubs; and closer to the lake a shop, restaurant, caravan and camping sites and the Crannog Visitor Centre.

The church of St Paulinus is a grade II* listed building.

The Llangors community also includes the small villages and settlements of Llanfihangel Talyllyn, Talyllyn, Pennorth, Cathedine, Llangasty Talyllyn and Llanywern.

== Governance ==
Llangors is an electoral ward for Powys County Council. Its boundaries are coterminous with those of Llangors community. One county councillor is elected from the ward. Between 1995 and 2012 the seat was held by the Liberal Democrats, until an independent candidate won the seat in May 2012.

At the May 2017 election Llangors became the first council seat in Powys to be won by the Green Party, but the seat was won back by the Liberal Democrats at the May 2022 election.

Llangors also has a community council, with up to ten community councillors elected or co-opted from two community wards, of Llangors and Llanfihangel Talyllyn.

== Local attractions ==
- Llangorse Lake
- The Welsh Crannog Centre
- Llangorse Multi Activity Centre
- Mynydd Troed & Mynydd Llangorse mountains
