= Llangorse Lake =

Site of Special Scientific Interest in Wales

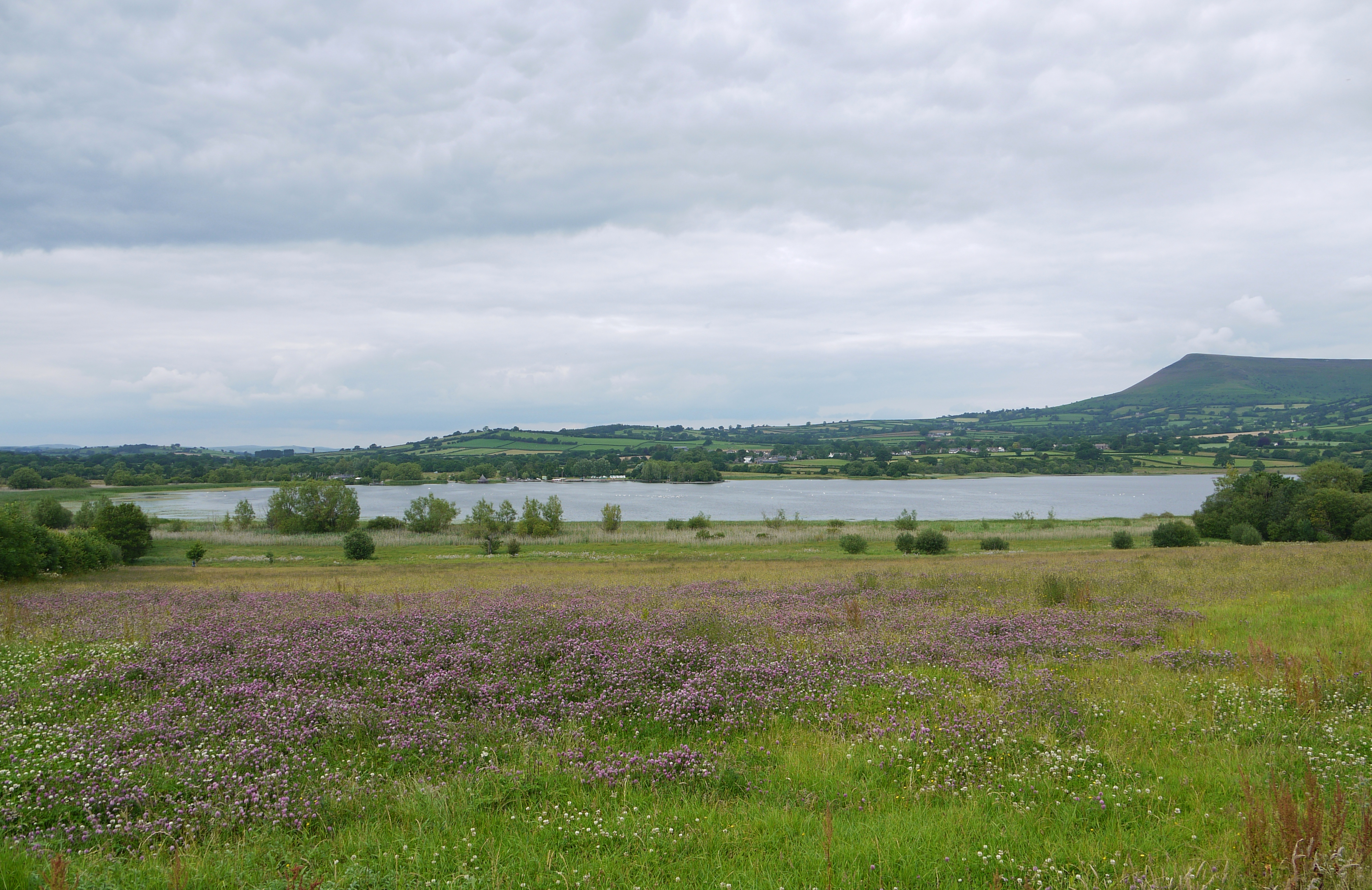
- The lake viewed from the southwest

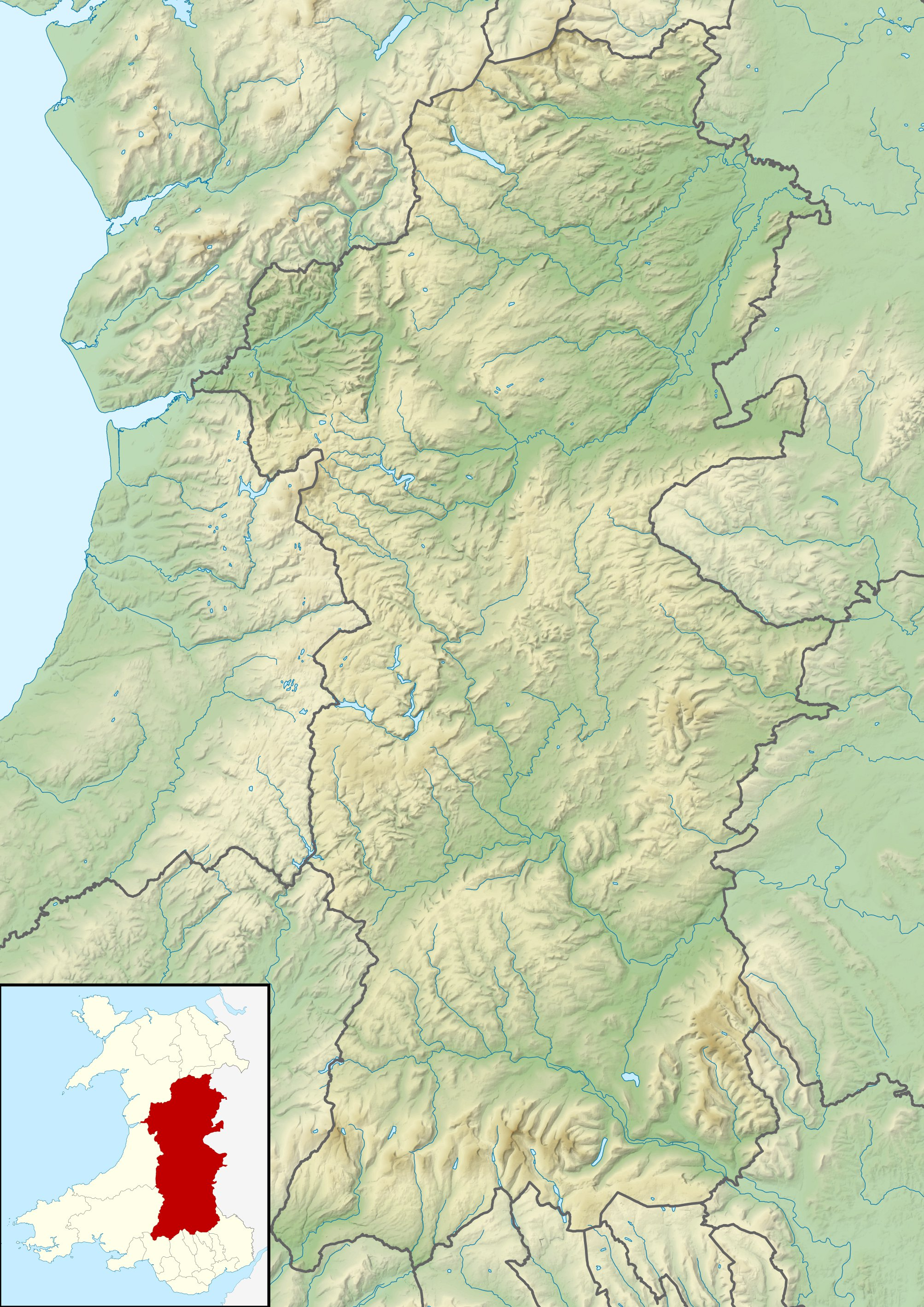
- Location within Powys
- Location: Wales
- Coordinates: 51°55′51.46″N 3°15′45.92″W
- Lake type: eutrophic glacial natural
- Basin countries: United Kingdom
- Surface area: 139 hectares (340 acres)
- Surface elevation: 154 m (505 ft)

Llangorse Lake, or Llangors Lake (Welsh: Llyn Syfaddon, variant: Llyn Syfaddan), is the largest natural lake in Mid and South Wales, and is situated in the Brecon Beacons National Park, near the town of Brecon and the village of Llangors.

The lake is famous for its coarse fishing (particularly pike), watersports, the afanc (a monster nicknamed 'Gorsey') and has the only example of a crannog in Wales. Llangorse Lake is also one of the most mentioned sites in Welsh folklore. It is a site of international conservation importance.

Due to the lake's long history of human activity, it has been known by several different names during its history, both in the Welsh language and in English: other names include the lake's original Welsh name, Llyn Syfaddon/Syfaddan, and Brycheiniog Mere. The name Llangorse Lake is comparatively recent.

== Geography ==
Llangorse Lake is a eutrophic glacial lake with a three-mile (5 km) perimeter covering an area of 139 hectares (340 acres). The lake is one mile (1.6 km) long, is 505 feet (154 m) above sea level and has a maximum depth of 7.75 m (25 ft 5 in). It occupies a glacially scoured rock basin partly enhanced by morainic debris within the drainage basin of the River Wye but close to that of the River Usk to the south. Afon Llynfi provides the main input of water into the lake and continues as the lake overflow stream.

== Natural history ==
The lake is a Site of Special Scientific Interest (SSSI) and has long been regarded as a place where fish and birds are found in unusually high numbers. Gerald of Wales (Giraldus Cambrensis) mentioned the abundance of waterfowl in his topographical work, The Description of Wales in the 12th century. It is a Special Area of Conservation (under the EU Habitats Directive) as an example of a natural nutrient-rich lake with pondweeds.

The supposed largest pike caught by rod in the UK was caught in Llangorse Lake in 1846 by O. Owen and supposedly weighed 68 pounds (31 kg), but this is unsubstantiated. If true, it would have been the largest pike in the world. The largest pike in the UK was actually caught from Llandegfedd Reservoir near Pontypool and weighed 46 pounds (21 kg). More recently the skull of a pike of unknown weight, though undoubtedly large (35–40+ lb), was found on the shores of the lake in 2004; it was taken away by the Environment Agency for age testing.

The Llangasty Nature Reserve forms an important protected area around the lake's boundary. The lake is a habitat of the scarce blue-tailed damselfly (Ishnura pumilio). In May 2011 hundreds of water voles were released near Llangorse Lake in an ongoing programme to try to restore their numbers.

== History ==
=== Crannog ===
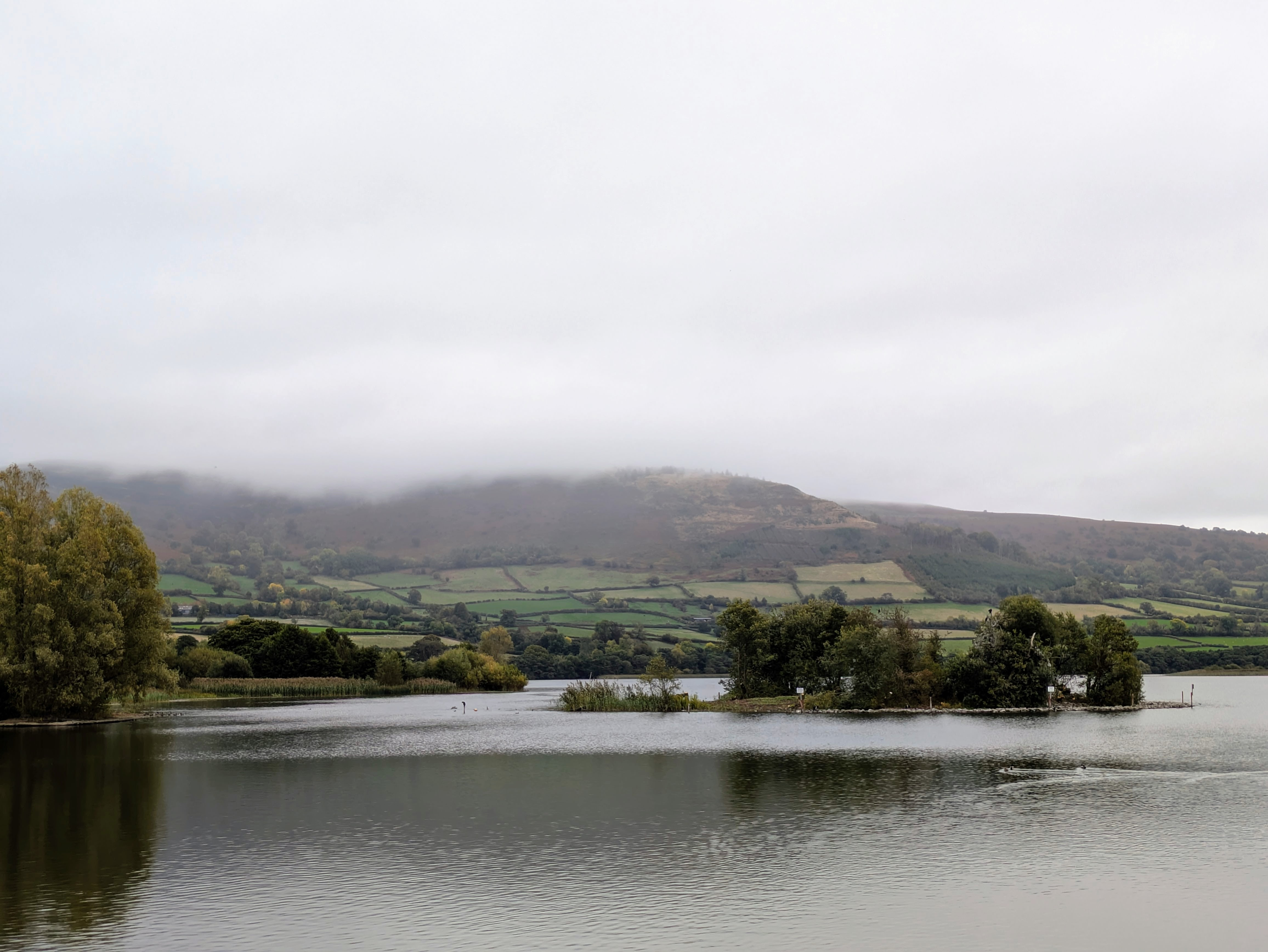
The crannog

The crannog is a small artificial island about 40 metres (130 ft) from the north shore. It is constructed of massive planks of oak behind which was built a dwelling platform formed from layers of stone, soil and brushwood. It was investigated by archaeologists from the National Museum of Wales between 1989 and 1993. Finds included a high quality textile and a bronze hinge from an 8th–9th century reliquary decorated in a style similar to that seen in Ireland. The 1993 dig was joined by the TV series Time Team and featured in series one, episode four in 1994. In 2005, works were carried out to protect the island from erosion.

=== Dugout boat ===
In 1925, archaeologists discovered a virtually complete dugout boat. Radiocarbon dating indicates that it originated in the 9th century.

=== Fort ===
In 916, Æthelflæd, Lady of the Mercians, sent an army into Brycheiniog to avenge the murder of the Mercian abbot Ecbryht and his companions. The Mercian army seized and burnt the royal fort on Llangorse Lake, and took the Queen of Brycheiniog and thirty-three others captive.

== Llangorse Lake in literature ==
As Lake Leucara, the lake (and surrounding area) features in the works of Raymond Williams, who wrote People of the Black Mountains detailing the lives of ordinary people in the area at intervals from 30,000 years ago through to medieval times.

In his diary of the 1870s, Francis Kilvert noted several visits to Llangorse Lake, including a July 1878 outing in the company of his father, when the pair caught a brace of perch in an hour.

== Gorsey, the Afanc of Llangorse Lake ==
The earliest known surviving literary reference to the afanc or lake monster of Llangorse is in a poem by the 15th century Welsh poet or bard, Lewys Glyn Cothi (English translation by John Rhys):

Yr avanc er ei ovyn
Wyv yn llech ar vin y llyn;
O don Llyn Syfaddon vo
Ni thynwyd ban aeth yno:
Ni'm tyn men nag ychain gwaith,
Oddiyma heddyw ymaith.

The afanc am I, who, sought for, bides
In hiding on the edge of the lake;
Out of the waters of Syfaddon Mere
Was be not drawn, once he got there.
So with me: nor wain nor oxen wont to toil
Me to-day will draw from here forth.

The afanc would have been well known in local folklore at the time of the composition of the poem.

Oll Lewis, an ecologist and cryptozoologist at the Centre for Fortean Zoology, has been studying the Afanc of Llangorse Lake for several years, and has proposed that it may represent sightings of the abnormally large pike of the lake. Adrian Lloyd Jones of the Welsh Beaver Project believes that afanc stories in Wales are folk memories of the presence of beavers. (The modern Welsh word for beaver is afanc).

== The Lost City ==
In a version of the flood myth, a legend states that the lake was once the site of a city whose inhabitants suffered divine retribution for their wickedness by being completely submerged beneath the waters of the newly formed lake. The only survivor was a baby floating in a cradle who was found by the Welsh king's ambassador. The child was later adopted by the king.

Another deluge tale is attached to a legendary city beneath Kenfig Pool near Porthcawl. This catastrophe was said to be the result of a vengeful curse. A third tradition with a similar motif explains the formation of Llyn Tegid (Bala Lake).

== See also ==
- Llangorse Mountain, British Columbia, Canada
