= Grade I listed buildings in Powys =

Powys shown within Wales

In the United Kingdom, the term listed building refers to a building or other structure officially designated as being of special architectural, historical, or cultural significance; Grade I structures are those considered to be "buildings of exceptional interest". Listing was begun by a provision in the Town and Country Planning Act 1947. Once listed, strict limitations are imposed on the modifications allowed to a building's structure or fittings. In Wales, the authority for listing under the Planning (Listed Buildings and Conservation Areas) Act 1990 rests with Cadw.

== Buildings ==
Name	Location Grid Ref. (Note: Sometimes known as OSGB36, the grid reference is based on the British national grid reference system used by the Ordnance Survey.) Geo-coordinates	Date Listed	Function	Notes	Reference Number	Image
St Silin's Church	Llansilin; SJ2096528185; 52°50′43″N 3°10′30″W	4 January 1966	Church	In the centre of village, a stone-walled churchyard with iron gates at west to High Street; prominent war memorial of Celtic Cross form; sundial.	638	See more images
Bronllys Castle Keep	Bronllys; SO1493834633; 52°00′13″N 3°14′26″W	28 September 1961	Castle keep	Located strategically near the crossing of the Llynfi River, on a motte approximately 6m high	6616	See more images
St Ellyw's Church, Llanelieu	Talgarth; SO1849234183; 52°00′00″N 3°11′19″W	28 September 1961	Church	Located at the head of the Cwm Rhyd-Ellywe, within a raised oval walled churchyard	6622	See more images
Great Porthamel Farm Gatehouse	Talgarth; SO1595235190; 52°00′32″N 3°13′33″W	28 September 1961	gatehouse	Situated on the approach to Great Porthamel farmhouse, by the side of the main road from Talgarth to Hay	6641	See more images
Trefecca Fawr	Talgarth; SO1427431691; 51°58′37″N 3°14′58″W	28 February 1952	Country House	Situated S of Trefeca hamlet on a minor lane, about 100m from its junction with the B4560 Talgarth to Llangors road	6653	See more images
Old Gwernyfed	Gwernyfed; SO1824936558; 52°01′17″N 3°11′34″W	28 February 1952	House	Located on NW side of road from Talgarth to Felindre, and set within its own grounds at the end of an axial driveway from the entrance gates on the road. The former farm buildings lie immediately to the NE of the drive.	6654	See more images
Church of St Issui	Patrishow, The Vale of Grwyney; SO2788822434; 51°53′45″N 3°02′58″W	19 July 1963	Church	Isolated hillside church on W side of Afon Grwyne Fawr.	6687	See more images
Llangynidr Bridge	Llangynidr; SO1520920262; 51°52′28″N 3°13′59″W	4 January 1952	Bridge	Spanning the River Usk on the B4560 in Lower Llangynidr. As can occur with bridges, Llangynidr has two listings, one for each end of the bridge.	6694	See more images
St David's Church	Llanddew; SO0548330743; 51°58′02″N 3°22′38″W	17 January 1963	Church	In a prominent position in Llanddew, in the churchyard just W of the crossroads in the centre of the village.	6730	See more images
St Matthew's Church	Llandefalle, Felin-fach; SO1075535574; 52°00′41″N 3°18′06″W	17 January 1963	Church	In the churchyard in the centre of Llandefalle some 900m W of the A470.	6731	See more images
St Bilo's Church	Llanfilo, Felin-fach; SO1190033252; 51°59′27″N 3°17′04″W	17 January 1963	Church	In the centre of the village of Llanfilo.	6742	See more images
Treberfydd	Llangors; SO1293425509; 51°55′17″N 3°16′03″W	17 January 1963	House	On rising ground above the S shore of Lake Llangorse, overlooking the Lake and Mynydd Troed, standing in a large garden and parkland reached by front and rear drives.	6757	See more images
St Cynog's Church	Defynnog, Maescar; SN9253627929; 51°56′22″N 3°33′53″W	17 January 1963	Church	Situated in large churchyard in the centre of Defynnog village.	6774	See more images
Abercamlais including Dovecote Cottage	Trallong; SN9649529014; 51°57′00″N 3°30′27″W	17 January 1963	Country House	Situated down drive to north of A40, some 4 km east of Sennybridge.	6785	See more images
St David's Church	Llywel; SN8694230054; 51°57′27″N 3°38′48″W	17 January 1963	Church	Situated some 1.2 km NW of Trecastle, on N side of A40, and E side of road to Tirabad.	6792	See more images
Scethrog Tower	Talybont-on-Usk; SO1046324940; 51°54′57″N 3°18′12″W	25 September 1951	Tower	At the southern edge of Scethrog hamlet, bordering the River Usk, on a mound and surrounded by a vestigial moat within a stone walled garden. Reached off south side of A40.	6800	See more images
Penpont Manor House	Trallong; SN9716028748; 51°56′52″N 3°29′52″W	25 September 1951	House	Situated down drive north of A40, on south bank of the Usk.	6802	See more images
Newton House	Brecon; SO0337828660; 51°56′53″N 3°24′26″W	25 September 1951	House	Between the road and the River Usk; reached via drive to Golf Course.	6803	See more images
Usk Bridge	Brecon; SO0429928591; 51°56′51″N 3°23′38″W	16 December 1976		Spanning River Usk, and linking Bridge Street with Watergate.	6815	See more images
Chapel and remains of nave at Christ College	Brecon; SO0428728441; 51°56′46″N 3°23′38″W	16 December 1976	Chapel	Within grounds of Christ College, to N of main school building.	6826	See more images
Ely Tower of Brecon Castle	Brecon; SO0424328793; 51°56′58″N 3°23′41″W	16 December 1976	Tower	On motte to NE of Castle Hotel, within walled grounds of Bishop's Residence.	6849	See more images
Great Hall at Brecon Castle	Brecon; SO0430428724; 51°56′56″N 3°23′38″W	16 January 1952	Great Hall	To E of Brecon Castle Hotel into which it has been partially incorporated.	6851	See more images
Brecon Cathedral	Brecon; SO0444329003; 51°57′05″N 3°23′31″W	16 January 1952	Cathedral	In large precinct to north of historic centre of Brecon.	6998	See more images
Brecon Cathedral Canonry and Vestries	Brecon; SO0441528967; 51°57′04″N 3°23′32″W	16 January 1952	Canonry	Running S from the SW corner of the Cathedral.	7002	See more images
Brecon Cathedral Chapter House, Clergy House and Deanery	Brecon; SO0445128937; 51°57′03″N 3°23′30″W	16 January 1952	Chapter House	About 40m S of south transept of Cathedral.	7003	See more images
Porth-Mawr Gatehouse	Crickhowell; SO2171718544; 51°51′36″N 3°08′17″W	4 January 1952	Gatehouse	Gatehouse adjoins side of Porth Mawr House, Brecon Road.	7158	See more images
Crickhowell Castle	Crickhowell; SO2173618253; 51°51′27″N 3°08′16″W	19 July 1963	Castle (ruined)	Situated to the SE of the High Street between Castle Road and Beaufort Street.	7192	See more images
Crickhowell Bridge	Crickhowell; SO2147318169; 51°51′24″N 3°08′30″W	19 July 1963	Bridge	Situated to SW of the town, spanning the River Usk. As can occur with bridges, Crickhowell Bridge has two listings, on for each end of the bridge.	7237	See more images
Hay Castle	Hay-on-Wye; SO2292542336; 52°04′26″N 3°07′34″W	24 October 1951	Castle	Dominating the town with Back Fold, Castle Lane and Oxford Road bordering the castle grounds.	7405	See more images
Craig-y-nos Castle theatre	Tawe Uchaf; SN8401715427; 51°49′31″N 3°41′04″W	14 March 1985	Theatre	The theatre is attached to the NW of the house with entrance from the corner of the front courtyard.	7492	See more images
Dolforwyn Castle	Llandyssil; SO1519495030; 52°32′47″N 3°15′07″W	10 March 1953	Castle	Located on a promontory above the Severn Valley, in a defensive position, with views all round.	7550	See more images
St Michael and All Angels Church	Kerry; SO1471790101; 52°30′08″N 3°15′28″W	10 March 1953	Church	Located within a circular churchyard on the N side of the Square, at the centre of Kerry village.	7558	See more images
Llandrinio Bridge	Llandrinio; SJ2983616988; 52°44′45″N 3°02′27″W	31 January 1953	Bridge	Carries the Llanfyllin to Shrewsbury Road over the River Severn.	7614	See more images
Church of St Melangell	Llangynog; SJ0242026550; 52°49′39″N 3°26′59″W	31 January 1953	Church	In the upper part of Cwm Pennant, close to the confluence of Cwm Nant-ewyn. Preaching cross shaft in churchyard, reused as sundial pillar.	7634	See more images
Church of St Tysilio and St Mary	Meifod; SJ1553713185; 52°42′35″N 3°15′06″W	31 January 1953	Church	Located near the centre of the extensive 3.6 hectares (8.9 acres) churchyard, within the village of Meifod.	7646	See more images
St Mary's Church	Welshpool; SJ2255907662; 52°39′40″N 3°08′47″W	11 March 1981	Church	Above the road in a steeply climbing churchyard.	7776	See more images
St Aelhaiarn's Church	Guilsfield; SJ2192511655; 52°41′49″N 3°09′24″W	25 April 1950	Church	Situated in a large oval raised graveyard at the centre of the village	7866	See more images
All Saints Church, Buttington	Trewern; SJ2498908841; 52°40′20″N 3°06′39″W	25 April 1950	Church	Situated at the junction of the main Shrewsbury to Welshpool road and the B4388, the Leighton Road, near the River Severn crossing.	7902	See more images
Montgomery Castle	Montgomery; SO2215296800; 52°33′48″N 3°09′00″W	19 July 1950	Castle	Situated at the top of Castle Hill, reached by footpath from car park by Old Castle Farm.	7947	See more images
Church of Saint Nicholas	Montgomery; SO2236296520; 52°33′40″N 3°08′48″W	19 July 1950	Church	Situated in large churchyard bounded on S and E by Church Bank.	7950	See more images
Old Market Hall	Llanidloes; SN9541984523; 52°26′55″N 3°32′25″W	24 October 1950	Market Hall	In the centre of town.	8317	See more images
Owain Glyndŵr's Parliament House	Machynlleth; SH7481600841; 52°35′27″N 3°50′58″W	19 January 1952	Parliament House	Midway along Heol Maengwyn, opposite the entrance to Plas Machynlleth	8429	See more images
Leighton Hall	Forden; SJ2411104584; 52°38′01″N 3°07′22″W	24 December 1982	Hall	Located approximately 1.4km S of Leighton church. The hall is reached by private road on the east side of the B4388 Buttington to Forden road, and is set in landscaped gardens.	8663	See more images
Leighton Hall Tower	Forden; SJ2414704555; 52°38′00″N 3°07′20″W	24 December 1982	Tower	Located approximately 1.4km S of Leighton church. The Tower is SE of Leighton Hall, reached by short private road E of B4388. A second (currently disused) service road leads to SW side of the Tower. The Tower has landscaped gardens to S and E.	19523	See more images
Old Vicarage	Glasbury; SO1772139031; 52°02′37″N 3°12′04″W	25 February 1952		Located close to and on a bend of the River Wye, set apart from the village, at the far S end at the end of the road.	8734	See more images
Maesyronnen Chapel	Glasbury; SO1766641096; 52°03′44″N 3°12′09″W	18 September 1960	Chapel	The chapel and adjoining cottage lie at the end of a lane off the road from the A.438 Hereford to Brecon Road to Ffynnon Gynnydd, near the top of a steep bank and overlooking the Cilcenni Dingle.	8756	See more images
Maesyronnen Chapel Cottage	Glasbury; SO1765341098; 52°03′44″N 3°12′09″W	18 September 1960	Cottage	The chapel and adjoining cottage lie at the end of a lane off the road from the A.438 Hereford to Brecon Road to Ffynnon Gynnydd, near the top of a steep bank and overlooking the Cilcenni Dingle.	17220	See more images
St Mary's Church	Gladestry; SO2306255107; 52°11′20″N 3°07′37″W	21 September 1962	Church	Situated in open churchyard above B4594, on NW side of village centre.	8774	See more images
St David's Church	Glascwm; SO1559253151; 52°10′13″N 3°14′08″W	21 September 1962	Church	In a round churchyard approximately 250m SW of the village centre and on the N side of the road through the village.	8780	See more images
St Michael's Church	Michaelchurch-on-Arrow, Gladestry; SO2474250711; 52°08′58″N 3°06′05″W	21 September 1962	Church	Situated in large churchyard uphill from road junction in middle of the village	8782	See more images
Bryndraenog	Beguildy; SO2040978537; 52°23′57″N 3°10′16″W	24 October 1951	House	Approximately 1.5km SE of Beguildy, reached by farm road on the W side of the B4355.	8792	Upload Photo
St Cewydd's Church	Disserth and Trecoed; SO0347358372; 52°12′54″N 3°24′51″W	31 May 1962	Church	In a walled churchyard on the E bank of the River Ithon, and the S side of a minor road between Howey and Newbridge-on-Wye, approximately 1.7km WSW of Howey.	8806	See more images
St Andrew's Church	Presteigne; SO3157864560; 52°16′30″N 3°00′15″W	28 November 1950	Church	In a spacious churchyard close to the River Lugg with Broad Street low down east and Church Street to north-west.	8830	See more images
St Mary Magdalene's Church	Bleddfa, SO2065468384; 52°18′28″N 3°09′55″W	24 October 1951	Church	Central position in small hamlet of Bleddfa. Nearly circular churchyard set back from triangular green on north side of A488. Ancient site, traditionally founded by the Irish saint Brendan in C6.	9122	See more images
Monaughty House	Llangunllo; SO2381568580; 52°18′36″N 3°07′08″W	24 October 1951	House	Situated to W of the junction of A488 and B4356.	9126	See more images
St Steven's Church	Old Radnor; SO2498859093; 52°13′30″N 3°05′59″W	15 February 1993	Church	Elevated position on Old Radnor Hill in circular churchyard.	9131	See more images
Vyrnwy Dam	Llanwddyn; SJ0178019250; 52°45′43″N 3°27′25″W	25 November 1993	Dam	In the Vyrnwy Valley, at the south-east end of this magnificent reservoir.	15621	See more images
Lake Vyrnwy Straining Tower	Llanwddyn; SJ0120620149; 52°46′12″N 3°27′57″W	25 November 1993	Water tower	On the north-east side of Lake Vrynwy visible from the dam; approached by a gated bridge from the lake-side road.	15622	See more images
Powis Castle	Welshpool; SJ2158406451; 52°39′00″N 3°09′38″W	25 April 1950	Castle	On a rock outcrop, in parkland to the S of the town.	7746	See more images
Marquess Gate at Powis Castle	Welshpool; SJ2161706463; 52°39′01″N 3°09′36″W	11 March 1981	Gateway	At the NE approach to the castle, facing Welshpool.	7747	Marquess Gate at Powis Castle
Brick wall to rear of Top Terrace at Powis Castle	Welshpool; SJ2160006440; 52°39′00″N 3°09′37″W	11 March 1981	Wall	The raised terrace lies immediately S of the flight of steps leading from the Marquess Gate to the E entrance to the castle.	7748	Brick wall to rear of Top Terrace at Powis Castle
Aviary Terrace at Powis Castle	Welshpool; SJ2160806428; 52°39′00″N 3°09′37″W	11 March 1981	Terrace	Forms the upper tier of the terraces immediately S of the castle	16775	See more images
Orangery Terrace at Powis Castle	Welshpool; SJ2161506421; 52°38′59″N 3°09′36″W	11 March 1981	Terrace	Forms the middle tier of the terraces immediately S of the castle	16776	See more images
Apple Slope Terrace at Powis Castle	Welshpool; SJ2163306405; 52°38′59″N 3°09′35″W	11 March 1981	Terrace	Forms the lowest tier of the terraces immediately S of the castle	16777	See more images
Outer Gateway at Powis Castle	Welshpool; SJ2152706390; 52°38′58″N 3°09′41″W	25 April 1950	Gateway	Forms the principal entrance to the castle, from the W. The retaining wall links the S pavilion with the main castle building.	16780	See more images
Retaining wall to courtyard at Powis Castle	Welshpool; SJ2155706405; 52°38′59″N 3°09′39″W	25 April 1950	Wall	Forms the principal entrance to the castle, from the W. The retaining wall links the S pavilion with the main castle building.	16781	See more images
Ballroom Range at Powis Castle	Welshpool; SJ2153006420; 52°38′59″N 3°09′41″W	25 April 1950		Forms the N boundary of the courtyard to the W of the main castle building.	16782	See more images
Ty Mawr	Castle Caereinion; SJ1727004365; 52°37′51″N 3°13′26″W	16 September 1998		Located on a platform site adjacent to the by-road leading SW off the B4345 to Berriew, S of Castle Caereinion.	20509	See more images
Tretower Court	Llanfihangel Cwmdu with Bwlch and Cathedine; SO1858021187; 51°53′00″N 3°11′04″W	21 October 1998	Country house	Approximately 150m S of the parish church on W side of a minor road between Tretower and A40	20656	See more images
Tretower Castle	Llanfihangel Cwmdu with Bwlch and Cathedine; SO1845621260; 51°53′02″N 3°11′10″W	21 October 1998	Castle	Prominently sited SW of church on S side of Ty Llys farm, W of Tretower Court. Farm buildings are contained within the bailey walls	20662	See more images

== See also ==
- Grade II* listed buildings in Powys
- Listed buildings in Wales
- Scheduled monuments in Powys
- Registered historic parks and gardens in Powys
