= Registered historic parks and gardens in Powys =

List of buildings in county of Wales

Powys shown within Wales

Powys is a county and preserved county in Wales. It covers an area of 5,180 km^{2} (2,000 sq mi) and in 2021 the population was approximately 133,600.

The Cadw/ICOMOS Register of Parks and Gardens of Special Historic Interest in Wales was established in 2002 and given statutory status in 2022. It is administered by Cadw, the historic environment agency of the Welsh Government. Elisabeth Whittle described Cadw as having a "somewhat special and guiding role" in the preservation of historic parks and gardens, since they are "an integral part of Welsh archaeological and architectural heritage". The register includes just under 400 sites, ranging from gardens of private houses, to cemeteries and public parks. Parks and gardens are listed at one of three grades, matching the grading system used for listed buildings. Grade I is the highest grade, for sites of exceptional interest; Grade II*, the next highest, denotes parks and gardens of great quality; while Grade II denotes sites of special interest.

There are 51 registered parks and gardens in Powys. Five are listed at Grade I, 16 at Grade II*, and 30 at Grade II.

== Key ==
Grade	Criteria
I	Parks and gardens of exceptional interest
II*	Parks and gardens of great quality
II	Parks and gardens of special interest

== List of parks and gardens ==
List of parks and gardens
Name	Location Grid Ref. (Note: Sometimes known as OSGB36, the grid reference is based on the British national grid reference system used by the Ordnance Survey.) Geo-coordinates	Date Listed	Description / Notes	Grade	Reference Number	Image
Abercynrig	Llanfrynach; SO0684227112; 51°56′03″N 3°21′19″W	1 February 2022	Country house garden The grounds of the late seventeenth-century house are divided into several walled garden enclosures. To the south of the house is an informal area of ponds, trees and shrubs.	II	PGW(Po)15(POW)	
Bodfach Hall	Llanfyllin; SJ1371120167; 52°46′19″N 3°16′45″W	1 February 2022	Park and country house garden The layout of the park dates from a rebuilding of the house in 1761. There was an ornamental garden here in the 1770s, however, the present garden was laid out following another rebuilding of the house in 1876.	II	PGW(Po)55(POW)	parkland with trees
Bodynfoel Hall	Llanfechain; SJ1746620268; 52°46′24″N 3°13′25″W	1 February 2022	Country house garden The gardens and parkland are thought to have been laid out in the 1830s–40s when the Tudor style house was built.	II	PGW(Po)42(POW)	a country house with trees around it, in the foreground is the stone wall of a ha-ha
Boultibrooke	Presteigne; SO3077565546; 52°17′00″N 3°00′54″W	1 February 2022	Country house garden The River Lugg marks the southern boundary of the estate which has early nineteenth-century wooded pleasure grounds and gardens.	II	PGW(Po)23(POW)	a country house, partly obscured by trees, overlooking a field with sheep
Broadheath House	Presteigne; SO3354063643; 52°16′00″N 2°58′26″W	1 February 2022	Country house garden The Edwardian Italianate garden was designed by Clough Williams-Ellis when he remodelled the Georgian manor house in the 1920s.	II	PGW(Po)22(POW)	
Bronllys Hospital	Bronllys; SO1340035082; 52°00′25″N 3°15′42″W	1 February 2022	Garden The estate of Pont-y-Wal House, with its eighteenth and nineteenth century parkland, was bought in 1913 as a hospital site. The hospital, originally a tuberculosis sanatorium, was built c. 1913–1920 by Edwin T. Hall and Stanley Hall.	II	PGW(Po)9(POW)	a path leading to a chapel
Brookland Hall	Guilsfield; SJ2131710006; 52°40′54″N 3°09′50″W	1 February 2022	Park and gardens The house (built c. 1860) is located within a park of around 40 acres (16 ha). The formal gardens which lie to the south and south-east of the house, and the walled kitchen garden to the north, are believed to be contemporary with the house.	II	PGW(Po)37(POW)	
Bryngwyn	Meifod; SJ1773818046; 52°45′12″N 3°13′08″W	1 February 2022	Park and country house garden The late eighteenth to early nineteenth-century landscape park and garden covers about 60 acres (24 ha) around the house (built 1773–74).	II*	PGW(Po)41(POW)	
Buckland House	Talybont-on-Usk; SO1286321972; 51°53′21″N 3°15′59″W	1 February 2022	Park and country house garden The gardens, which are located around the house and also in areas to its north and north-west, are within a park that covers about 200 acres (81 ha).	II	PGW(Po)6(POW)	a country house surrounded by trees
Cefn Bryntalch	Llandyssil; SO1758296330; 52°33′30″N 3°12′57″W	1 February 2022	Country house garden and kitchen garden The gardens are contemporary with the house c. 1870 by G. F. Bodley. To the west of the house are the remains of a motte-and-bailey castle, designated as a scheduled monument.	II*	PGW(Po)29(POW)	Cefn Bryntalch
Craig-y-Nos Castle and Country Park	Tawe-Uchaf; SN8413415461; 51°49′31″N 3°40′53″W	1 February 2022	Park and country house garden The site is located at the confluence of the rivers Llynfell and Tawe, with the house to the west and the 40-acre (16 ha) park to the east of the Tawe. The gardens were laid out for Adelina Patti who bought the estate in 1878.	II*	PGW(Po)16(POW)	aerial view of the house and surrounding parkland
The Dderw	Rhayader; SN9611768342; 52°18′11″N 3°31′25″W	1 February 2022	Park and gardens The park of about 10 acres (4.0 ha) and lies to the south of the nineteenth-century house, By the 1920s an Arts and Crafts terraced garden had been established.	II*	PGW(Po)47(POW)	
Doldowlod	Nantmel; SN9975162425; 52°15′02″N 3°28′07″W	1 February 2022	Park and gardens The appearance of the park is thought to be contemporary with the building of the house in the 1840s. Development of the gardens followed the remodelling of the house in the 1870s, and saw the erection of a large conservatory that was later replaced with stone Italianate garden terraces.	II	PGW(Po)52(POW)	a country house in parkland between a river in the foreground and a forest in the background
Evancoyd	Old Radnor; SO2583962894; 52°15′32″N 3°05′12″W	1 February 2022	Park and gardens The house (built c. 1835) and gardens, the present layout of which are believed to date from the late nineteenth century, are in the north-east of the estate overlooking a small park.	II	PGW(Po)51(POW)	
Ffrwdgrech	Llanfrynach; SO0309727153; 51°56′02″N 3°24′35″W	1 February 2022	Park and gardens The house was built in c. 1828 and lies within a small, picturesque landscape park that was created at this time. A large programme of tree planting took place in the park and pleasure grounds during the 1880s.	II	PGW(Po)17(POW)	
The Garth	Guilsfield; SJ2150911002; 52°41′26″N 3°09′41″W	1 February 2022	Park and kitchen garden The walled garden may be associated with an earlier house of 1717. The other buildings and structures in the park, which covers about 200 acres (81 ha), are contemporary with the mansion built c. 1810 by John Claudius Loudon, but demolished in 1947.	II	PGW(Po)38(POW)	The Garth
Garthmyl Hall	Berriew; SO1896399003; 52°34′57″N 3°11′46″W	1 February 2022	Park and gardens The park surrounding the house covers about 15 acres (6.1 ha). The gardens, which lie to the west and north of the house, had taken on their present form by the 1880s.	II	PGW(Po)58(POW)	a circular pool with a statue in the centre of it, the house is in the background
Glangrwyney Court	The Vale of Grwyney; SO2423416535; 51°50′31″N 3°06′00″W	1 February 2022	Park and country house garden The 33-acre (13 ha) park and the ha-ha are thought to be contemporary with the late-Georgian house.	II	PGW(Po)44(POW)	Glangrwyney Court
Glansevern Hall	Berriew; SO1956399908; 52°35′26″N 3°11′15″W	1 February 2022	Park and gardens The house was designed by Joseph Bromfield and built c. 1800. The surrounding pleasure grounds and gardens are believed to be contemporary with it and cover about 12 acres (4.9 ha) within the parkland of approximately 100 acres (40 ha).	II*	PGW(Po)31(POW)	a lawn in front of a country house
Glanusk Park and Penmyarth	Llangattock; SO1917619707; 51°52′11″N 3°10′27″W	1 February 2022	Park and gardens The house (since demolished) at Glanusk Park was built for Ironmaster Sir Joseph Bailey on land he bought in 1825. He incorporated the neighbouring estate of Penmyarth in 1831 with its grounds being used as a deer park.	II*	PGW(Po)3(POW)	a river crossed by a bridge on the left of which is a tower
Gliffaes	Llanfihangel Cwmdu with Bwlch and Cathedine; SO1704319996; 51°52′19″N 3°12′18″W	1 February 2022	Country house garden and kitchen garden The gardens were laid out in c. 1845 but were developed mainly following the construction of a new house in the 1880s.	II*	PGW(Po)4(POW)	an Italianate house with a tall bell tower
Glyn Celyn	Felin-fach; SO0855132744; 51°59′07″N 3°19′54″W	1 February 2022	Kitchen garden and woodland garden The wooded pleasure grounds and walled garden are contemporary with the late Georgian country house built c. 1830–1835 for the Rev. Charles Griffith.	II	PGW(Po)50(POW)	
Gregynog	Tregynon; SO0802397075; 52°33′48″N 3°21′25″W	1 February 2022	Park and gardens William Emes (c. 1174), Henry Avray Tipping (1930–1933) and Sylvia Crowe (1972) are all associated with what Cadw describes as "one of the most important parks and gardens in Powys" which dates from at least 1500.	I	PGW(Po)33(POW)	a stone fountain in front of a house painted black and white to resemble a half-timbered appearance
The Hall, Abbey Cwmhir	Abbey Cwmhir; SO0545371125; 52°19′47″N 3°23′15″W	1 February 2022	Park and gardens The estate dates to the twelfth century with the establishment of a Cistercian abbey, to the north of which were two deer parks. The monastic ruins were incorporated into the formal gardens of the nineteenth-century country house.	II	PGW(Po)46(POW)	a country house with gardens
Harpton Court	Old Radnor; SO2333659785; 52°13′50″N 3°07′21″W	1 February 2022	Park and gardens The landscape park and gardens of an eighteenth and early nineteenth century country mansion. Notable features are the lime avenue in the park and the exceptionally well preserved walled kitchen garden.	II	PGW(Po)59(POW)	Harpton Court
Hay Castle	Hay; SO2284542347; 52°04′25″N 3°07′33″W	1 February 2022	Country house garden The grounds of the medieval castle contain the terraced formal garden, thought to be contemporary with construction of the manor house in c. 1660, and the later pleasure grounds.	II	PGW(Po)11(POW)	Hay Castle
Leighton Hall	Forden with Leighton and Trelystan; SJ2411704661; 52°38′03″N 3°07′17″W	1 February 2022	Park and gardens The high-Victorian formal garden was designed by Edward Kemp and is contemporary with the Gothic style house built in the 1850s. A model farm was built to the north of the house and to the south-east of the main garden is a walled kitchen garden.	I	PGW(Po)34(POW)	Aerial view showing the house in the centre of the image and the walled garden to the top right
Llandrindod Wells Public Parks	Llandrindod Wells; SO0591060758; 52°14′12″N 3°22′41″W	1 February 2022	Public parks The group of parks, which includes The Lake and Common, Memorial Gardens, Montpelier Park, Rock Park and Temple Gardens, are associated with the development of Llandrindod Wells as a nineteenth-century spa town.	II*	PGW(Po)20(POW)	a bandstand in a park (temple gardens), with houses in the background
Llanerchydol Hall	Welshpool; SJ2072607638; 52°39′37″N 3°10′20″W	1 February 2022	Park and gardens The park was laid out when the house was rebuilt, c. 1820. The Japanese garden dates to the 1920s.	II*	PGW(Po)36(POW)	a country house in parkland
Llangattock Park	Llangattock; SO2128917413; 51°50′58″N 3°08′34″W	1 February 2022	Park and country house garden The park may have had origins as a medieval deer park and once covered an area of about 382 acres (155 ha), though much of the west side of the park has been lost to re-development. Around the house, built in 1838, is a small ornamental pleasure ground.	II	PGW(Po)2(POW)	Llangattock Park
Llangedwyn Hall	Llangedwyn; SJ1896224553; 52°48′44″N 3°12′09″W	1 February 2022	Country house garden and kitchen garden The early eighteenth-century formal terraced garden retains some of its original ornamental features.	II*	PGW(Po)1(POW)	Llangedwyn Hall
Llangoed Hall	Bronllys; SO1185539971; 52°03′02″N 3°17′08″W	1 February 2022	Country house garden and ornamental garden The gardens are attributed to Clough Williams-Ellis who remodelled the house in the 1910s and incorporated the nineteenth-century tree planting and ha-ha into the layout. The walled garden north of the Hall has been redeveloped since the 1990s to include a series of themed gardens.	II	PGW(Po)12(POW)	a large country house
Lymore Park	Montgomery; SO2328196051; 52°33′24″N 3°07′54″W	1 February 2022	Park The deer and landscape park is bounded on the west by the B4385 road and on the east by Offa's Dyke. The seventeenth-century house was demolished in 1931.	II	PGW(Po)14(POW)	parkland with a lake
Maesfron	Trewern; SJ2795411464; 52°41′45″N 3°03′58″W	1 February 2022	Country house garden and walled garden The gardens of the late-Georgian house cover about 3 acres (1.2 ha). To the south of the house are a series of grassy terraces, a castellated stone gazebo and a grotto.	II	PGW(Po)53(POW)	a stone gazebo
Maesllwch Castle	Glasbury; SO1720440271; 52°03′15″N 3°12′28″W	1 February 2022	Park and gardens The 300-acre (120 ha) landscape park forms the Picturesque setting to the grade II listed mock castle built c. 1830–1840 though later remodelled.	II*	PGW(Po)18(POW)	aerial view of a country house within parkland
Mellington Hall	Churchstoke; SO2570492240; 52°31′21″N 3°05′43″W	1 February 2022	Park and gardens The mid-Victorian house, now a hotel, is within a park of about 100 acres (40 ha) that is bisected by Offa's Dyke. An area of the gardens to the south of the house is now used as a caravan site.	II	PGW(Po)28(POW)	countryside with trees in the distance, the earthwork on the left is Offa's Dyke
Old Gwernyfed & Gwernyfed Park	Gwernyfed; SO1755437274; 52°01′38″N 3°12′07″W	1 February 2022	Deer park and gardens In the south-east of the registered area is the gentry house of Old Gwernyfed and its seventeenth-century formal gardens. Its former deer park, to the north-west, became the landscape park of the house designed by William Eden Nesfield in 1877–1880 which became a school in 1950.	II*	PGW(Po)5(POW)	Old Gwernyfed & Gwernyfed Park
Pencerrig	Llanelwedd; SO0420954012; 52°10′32″N 3°24′04″W	1 February 2022	Park and country house garden Pencerrig was the home of landscape painter Thomas Jones (1742–1803) who used the estate and surrounding landscape as inspiration for his works. He also kept records of expenditure and works undertaken on the grounds which included an extensive period of replanting in 1792–1796.	II	PGW(Po)19(POW)	a Gothic style country house
Penoyre	Yscir; SO0178230773; 51°57′59″N 3°25′47″W	1 February 2022	Park and country house garden The house was designed by Anthony Salvin for Colonel Lloyd Vaughan Watkins in 1846–1848 at which time the gardens, which included a series of Italianate terraces, were laid out. A golf course had replaced the pleasure grounds and areas of parkland.	II	PGW(Po)13(POW)	Penoyre
Penpont	Trallong; SN9711728818; 51°56′52″N 3°29′50″W	1 February 2022	Park and gardens A large part of the park lies to the south of the A40 road. The house and largely informal gardens lie between the road and the River Usk over which there is a bridge of c. 1660. The kitchen garden lies to the north of the river.	II*	PGW(Po)21(POW)	a country house with a portico along the front of it, there is snow on the ground
Plas Dinam	Llandinam; SO0284089167; 52°29′29″N 3°25′52″W	1 February 2022	Country house garden The house was designed and built by William Eden Nesfield in 1873–74 and the gardens and grounds were laid out at this time or soon after.	II	PGW(Po)25(POW)	Plas Dinam
Plas Llangattock	Llangattock; SO2115217908; 51°51′14″N 3°08′42″W	1 February 2022	Cottage garden The garden of the early-eighteenth century house was re-designed in the 1930s and laid out with 'garden rooms' that were rich in botanical interest.	II*	PGW(Po)45(POW)	
Plas Machynlleth	Machynlleth; SH7462900323; 52°35′09″N 3°51′03″W	1 February 2022	Public park and garden The landscape park was created from c. 1840 to provide a fine setting for the mansion. Since 1948, when the property came in to civic ownership, parts of the gardens have become sports fields and a housing development, and the remains of the pleasure grounds became a public park.	II	PGW(Po)26(POW)	Plas Machynlleth
Powis Castle Garden	Welshpool; SJ2155306362; 52°38′56″N 3°09′35″W	1 February 2022	Terraced garden Cadw describes this site as "the finest surviving baroque late seventeenth-century/ early eighteenth-century garden terraces in the United Kingdom" and regards it to be "of exceptional historic and horticultural interest".	I	PGW(Po)35(POW)	a large red sandstone building overlooking a series of terraces
Silia	Presteigne; SO3056064282; 52°16′19″N 3°01′04″W	1 February 2022	Woodland garden The site is noted for its late Victorian arboretum which was planted c. 1870–1896 when the lodge was the only building on the site. There is a more formal area of garden around the house, which was built c. 1906.	II	PGW(Po)49(POW)	
St Aelhaiarn's churchyard	Guilsfield; SJ2183411690; 52°41′49″N 3°09′24″W	1 February 2022	Cemetery garden It is probable that the churchyard contained yew trees in the medieval era and these remain an important feature of the layout with some of those present thought to date from the seventeenth century.	II*	PGW(Po)54(POW)	a church with a square tower and small spire, in a churchyard with trees and headstones
Stanage Park	Knighton; SO3305871997; 52°20′30″N 2°58′58″W	1 February 2022	Park and gardens The building of the house and laying out of the parkland was the work of Humphry Repton and John Adey Repton in the early nineteenth century.	I	PGW(Po)24(POW)	A lake surrounded by trees
Treberfydd	Llangors; SO1291125671; 51°55′20″N 3°16′00″W	1 February 2022	Park and gardens The gardens were laid out in 1850 by William Andrews Nesfield who probably incorporated some of the existing ornamental layout into his design.	II*	PGW(Po)7(POW)	Treberfydd
Trefecca Fawr	Talgarth; SO1415531737; 51°58′37″N 3°15′00″W	1 February 2022	Garden The area to the north of the seventeenth-century gentry house includes a scheduled monument consisting of two medieval fishponds. The Arts and Crafts style formal gardens were laid out in the early twentieth century.	II	PGW(Po)8(POW)	a rubble sandstone house
Trelydan Hall	Welshpool; SJ2294010639; 52°41′15″N 3°08′25″W	1 February 2022	Park and country house garden The form of the present garden is thought to have been laid out between 1890 and 1920 in a style typical of the period. The site is registered for the relict garden features associated with the mainly Tudor and Jacobean house.	II	PGW(Po)39(POW)	
Vaynor Park	Berriew; SJ1728900311; 52°35′38″N 3°13′16″W	1 February 2022	Park and gardens The largely wooded area to the north of the house is the oldest part of the park and was probably developed when the house was built in the early seventeenth century. The house and grounds were re-modelled c. 1840 by Thomas Penson for John Winder Lyon-Winder.	I	PGW(Po)32(POW)	an aerial view of the park, the house is to the right, the walled garden is to the left

== See also ==
- Scheduled monuments in Powys
- Grade I listed buildings in Powys
- Grade II* listed buildings in Powys
