= List of crossings of the River Usk =

Key to heritage status
Status	Criteria
I	Grade I listed. Bridge of exceptional interest, sometimes considered to be internationally important
II*	Grade II* listed. Particularly important bridge of more than special interest
II	Grade II listed. Bridge of national importance and special interest

Crossing	Date	Coordinates	Heritage status	Locality	Notes	Image
Usk Reservoir Dam		51.9443°N 3.6986°W				Full to the brim
Minor Road Bridge under Dam		51.9473°N 3.6942°W				
Cwmwysg Footbridge		51.9416°N 3.6719°W				Pombren_Cwmwysg_-_Cwmwysg_footbridge_-_geograph.org.uk_-_6951689
Pont Cwmwysg	Early 19th Cent	51.9415°N 3.6704°W	II			Bridge at Cwmwysg
Chapel St Bridge		51.9454°N 3.63°W		Trecastle		Pont Newydd
Pont Pantyscallog	Late 18th Cent	51.9503°N 3.5969°W	II			Pont Pantysgallog
Pont Ynysyrwyddfa		51.9449°N 3.5837°W			A40	
Sennybridge Training Area Bridge		51.9455°N 3.5726°W				Bridge over the River Usk at Sennybridge
Pont Llwyncyntefin	1750	51.9506°N 3.5664°W	II	Sennybridge		Pont Llwyncyntefin
Minor Road Bridge		51.9549°N 3.5338°W				Road and rail bridge, Trallong
Abercamlais Bridge	1600	51.9504°N 3.507°W	II*	Trallong		
Suspension bridge at Abercamlais	Mid-to later 19th Cent	51.9503°N 3.5056°W	II	Trallong		
Penpont Bridge	1660	51.9484°N 3.4985°W	II*			Bridge over the River Usk at Penpont
Aberbran Bridge	1791	51.9518°N 3.4748°W	II			Aber-bran Bridge
Usk Bridge	1563	51.9476°N 3.3938°W	I	Brecon		Usk Bridge, Brecon
A40 Bridge		51.9393°N 3.3622°W		Brecon		River_Usk_above_A40_Brecon_by-pass_bridge_-_geograph.org.uk_-_6818894
Lock Road Bridge	Late 18th Cent	51.9364°N 3.3434°W	II*			B4558_Lock_Road_Bridge_over_River_Usk_from_Brynich_Aqueduct_-_geograph.org.uk_-_3379452
Cefn Brynich Aqueduct	1800	51.9365°N 3.3409°W	II*	Monmouthshire and Brecon Canal		Aqueduct_over_the_Usk_-_geograph.org.uk_-_381929
Station Road Bridge		51.9016°N 3.2769°W		Talybont-on-Usk		River Usk road bridge viewed from the riverbank, Llansantffraed
Llandetty Hall Footbridge		51.881°N 3.2684°W			Derelict	Derelict_suspension_bridge_across_the_River_Usk_-_geograph.org.uk_-_4128961
Llangynidr Bridge	~1700	51.8745°N 3.233°W	I	Llangynidr		Llangynidr Bridge
Glanusk Bridge	1836	51.8719°N 3.1749°W	II*			Glanusk Park Bridge
Crickhowell Bridge	1706	51.8566°N 3.1416°W	I	Crickhowell	A4077	Crickhowell Bridge, from the north
Glangrwyney Bailey Bridge		51.8380°N 3.1037°W		Glangrwyney		Side view of Glangrwyney Bailey bridge.
Gas Pipeline		51.8193°N 3.03°W				Pipeline_over_the_River_Usk_near_Abergavenny_-_geograph.org.uk_-_3544283
Abergavenny Bridge	17th Cent	51.8194°N 3.0292°W	II*	Abergavenny		The_Usk_Bridge_at_Abergavenny_-_geograph.org.uk_-_6457356
Pipe Bridge		51.8128°N 3.0155°W		Abergavenny		Pipe bridge over the Usk/Wysg
Abergavenny Bypass Bridge		51.8116°N 3.0169°W		Abergavenny	A465	
Llanellen Bridge	1821	51.7933°N 3.0082°W	II	Llanellen		Usk Bridge at Llanellen
St Bartholomew's Church Footbridge		51.7796°N 2.9887°W		Llanover		Footbridge over the River Usk at Llanover
Railway Bridge		51.7791°N 2.9721°W			Welsh Marches Line	Usk_Valley_Walk_(1)_-_geograph.org.uk_-_8051731
Pant-y-Goitre Bridge	1821	51.7751°N 2.946°W	II*	Llanvihangel Gobion		Pant-y-Goitre Bridge, River Usk
Chain Bridge	1906	51.7452°N 2.9482°W	II		Still called Chain Bridge although replaced with steel arch in 1906	The_Chainbridge_at_Chain_Bridge_-_geograph.org.uk_-_3255288
Old Rail Bridge		51.7065°N 2.9077°W		Usk	Coleford, Monmouth, Usk and Pontypool Railway	Old railway bridge over The Usk
Usk Bridge (Usk)	1747	51.7018°N 2.9068°W	II*	Usk		Stone arches of Usk Bridge
New Bridge	1779	51.6486°N 2.8903°W	II*	Tredunnock		The_bridge,_Newbridge_on_Usk_-_geograph.org.uk_-_4016746
Twenty Ten Bridge		51.6163°N 2.9389°W		Celtic Manor Resort		The_Twenty_Ten_Bridge,_Celtic_Manor_Resort
Caerleon Bridge	1812	51.6073°N 2.9528°W	II	Caerleon		Caerleon Bridge over River Usk, High Street, Caerleon
Rail Bridge		51.607°N 2.9817°W		Newport	Welsh Marches Line	Driftwood trapped in a railway bridge support frame, Newport
M4 Bridge		51.6044°N 2.9906°W		Newport		The M4 Motorway River Usk crossing (2)
Rail Bridge		51.5914°N 2.994°W		Newport	South Wales Main Line	River Usk bridge at Newport
Newport Bridge	1927	51.5904°N 2.9943°W	II			Newport bridge, Newport
Newport City Footbridge		51.587°N 2.9901°W		Newport		Pedestrian_footbridge_over_river,_Newport_-_geograph.org.uk_-_8229053
George St Bridge	1964	51.5843°N 2.984°W	II*	Newport		George_Street_bridge,_Newport_-_geograph.org.uk_-_8057033
City Bridge		51.5769°N 2.9743°W		Newport	A48	The_southern_side_of_City_Bridge._Newport_-_geograph.org.uk_-_3947496
Newport Transporter Bridge	1906	51.5706°N 2.9855°W	I	Newport		Transporter_Bridge_(detail),_Newport_-_geograph.org.uk_-_5572072
