= Newton House =

Newton House may refer to:

== Places ==
=== United Kingdom ===
- Newton House, Knaresborough, in North Yorkshire
- Newton House (Llandeilo, Carmarthenshire)
- Newton House (Brecon, Powys)
- Newton Surmaville (also known as Newton House), in Somerset

=== in the United States ===
- McDonald-Wait-Newton House, Little Rock, Arkansas, listed on the National Register of Historic Places (NRHP) in Little Rock Arkansas
- Rev. Thomas Newton House, Ashville, Alabama, NRHP-listed in St. Clair County
- Newton House (Athens, Georgia), NRHP-listed in Clarke County
- James P. Newton House and Maid Cottage, Sioux City, Iowa, NRHP-listed in Woodbury County, Iowa
- Newton-Kemp Houses, Bowling Green, Kentucky, listed on the NRHP in Warren County, Kentucky
- Newton House (Clay Village, Kentucky), listed on the NRHP in Kentucky
- Azariah Newton House, Milford, Massachusetts, listed on the NRHP in Massachusetts
- S. D. Newton House, Worcester, Massachusetts, listed on the NRHP in Massachusetts
- Charles Newton House, Worcester, Massachusetts, listed on the NRHP in Massachusetts
- Newton-Allaire House, Cheboygan, Michigan, listed on the NRHP in Michigan
- George Newton House, Marcellus, Michigan, listed on the NRHP in Michigan
- Newton Friends' Meetinghouse, Camden, New Jersey, listed on the NRHP in New Jersey
- Philo Newton Cobblestone House, Hartland, New York, listed on the NRHP in New York
- A. Newton Farm, Orleans, New York, listed on the NRHP in New York
- Newton Homestead, South Otselic, New York, listed on the NRHP in New York
- Newton Homesite and Cemetery, Carolina Beach, North Carolina, listed on the NRHP in North Carolina
- Judge Eben Newton House, Canfield, Ohio, listed on the NRHP in Ohio
- Newton House (Austin, Texas), listed on the NRHP in Texas
- William Walter Newton House, Jacksonville, Texas, listed on the NRHP in Texas
- Marvin Newton House, Brookfield Center, Vermont, listed on the NRHP in Vermont
