= Porth-Mawr Gatehouse =

Gatehouse in Crickhowell, Powys, Wales

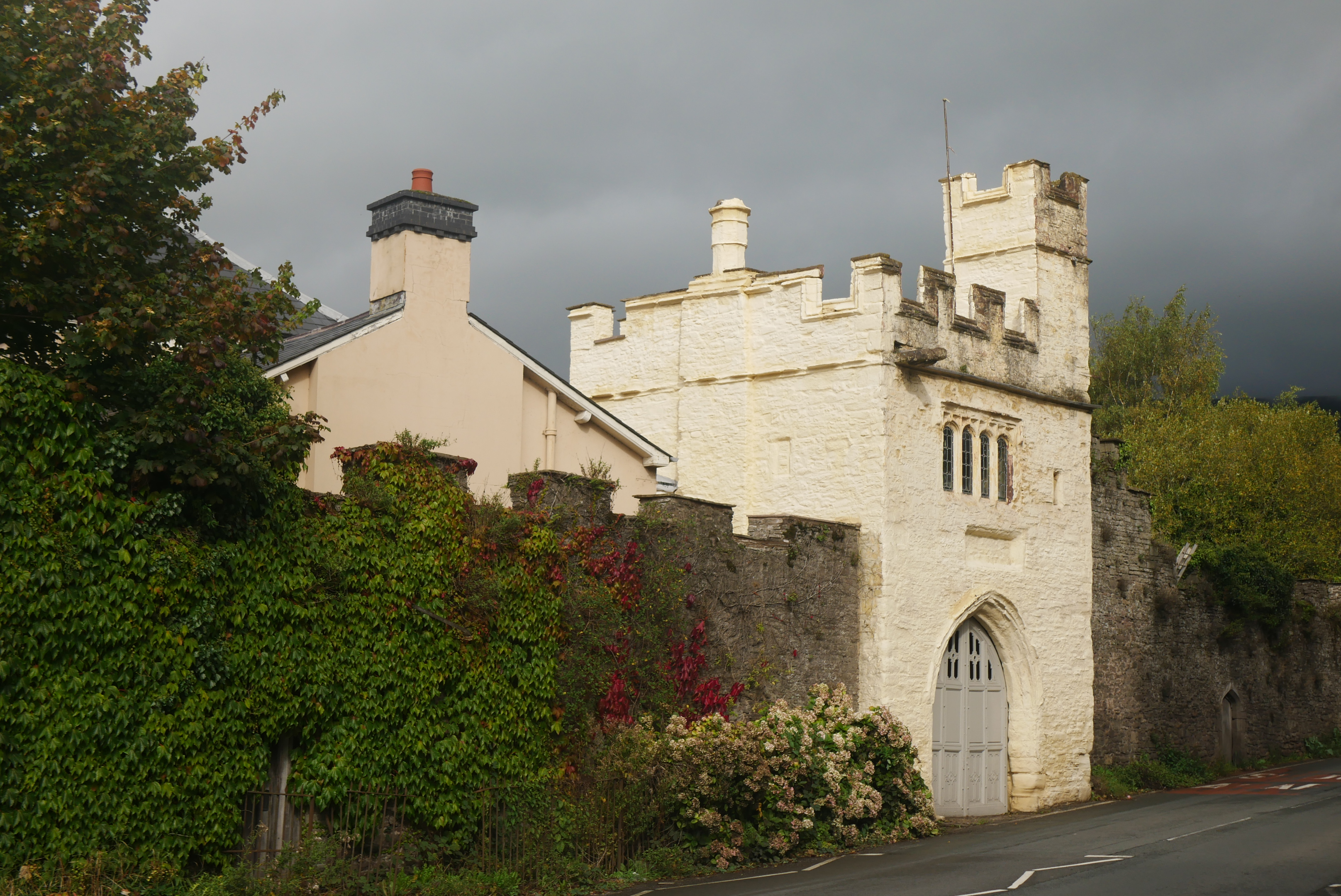

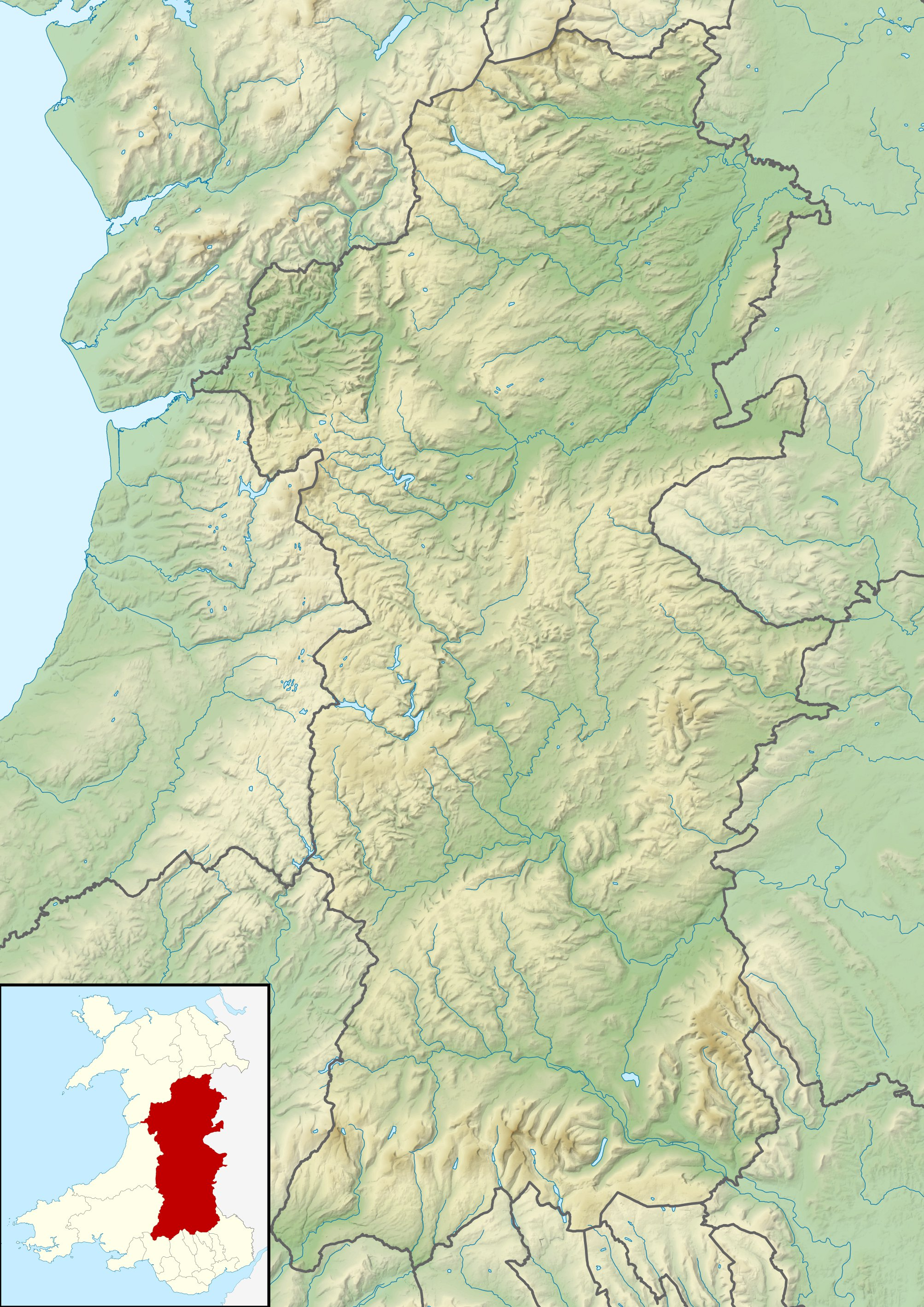
- Location within Powys
- 51.8604°N 3.1376°W
- Type: Gatehouse
- Location: Crickhowell, Powys, Wales

History
- Built: 15th century

Site notes
- Governing body: Privately owned

Listed Building – Grade I
- Official name: Porth-Mawr Gatehouse
- Designated: 4 January 1952
- Reference no.: 7158

Scheduled monument
- Official name: Porth Mawr
- Reference no.: BR114

Porth-Mawr (Great Gate) is a gatehouse on Brecon Street in the centre of Crickhowell, Powys, Wales. Constructed in the 15th century by a branch of the Herbert family as the entrance to their Tudor mansion of Cwrt Carw, it is a Grade I listed building.

== History and description ==
The Herbert family, of Raglan Castle, were Anglo-Welsh nobility whom became predominant in South East Wales in the 15th century. A branch of the family constructed a large mansion at Crickhowell, Cwrt Carw (Cwrt-y-Carw), and Porth-Mawr (Great Gate) was built as a grand gatehouse entrance to the mansion in the late 15th century. The mansion itself was torn down in the 19th century after a serious fire, and a new house was built on the site in around 1825. At the same time, the gatehouse, and the attached wall in which it is set, were given castellated decoration. Robert Scourfield and Richard Haslam, in their Powys volume in the Buildings of Wales series, describe the reconstruction as "highly Picturesque". The Royal Commission on the Ancient and Historical Monuments of Wales attributes the wall to the late 18th and/or early 19th centuries.

The gatehouse is built of rubble and is of two-storeys. (Note: During extensive reconstruction at the very end of the 20th century, the gatehouse was given a, historically accurate, coating of yellow limewash. This provoked considerable comment in the local press.) A spiral staircase leads to a first-storey chamber and the gatehouse has a small turret to the roof. Porth-Mawr is both a Grade I listed building and a scheduled monument. Cadw's listing record notes Porth-Mawr is an example of a gatehouse to a secular, as opposed to an ecclesiastical, building, of a type relatively rare in Wales.

== Sources ==
- Scourfield, Robert; Haslam, Richard (2013). Powys: Montgomeryshire, Radnorshire and Breconshire. The Buildings of Wales. New Haven, US and London: Yale University Press. ISBN 978-0-300-18508-9.
