= Bryndraenog =

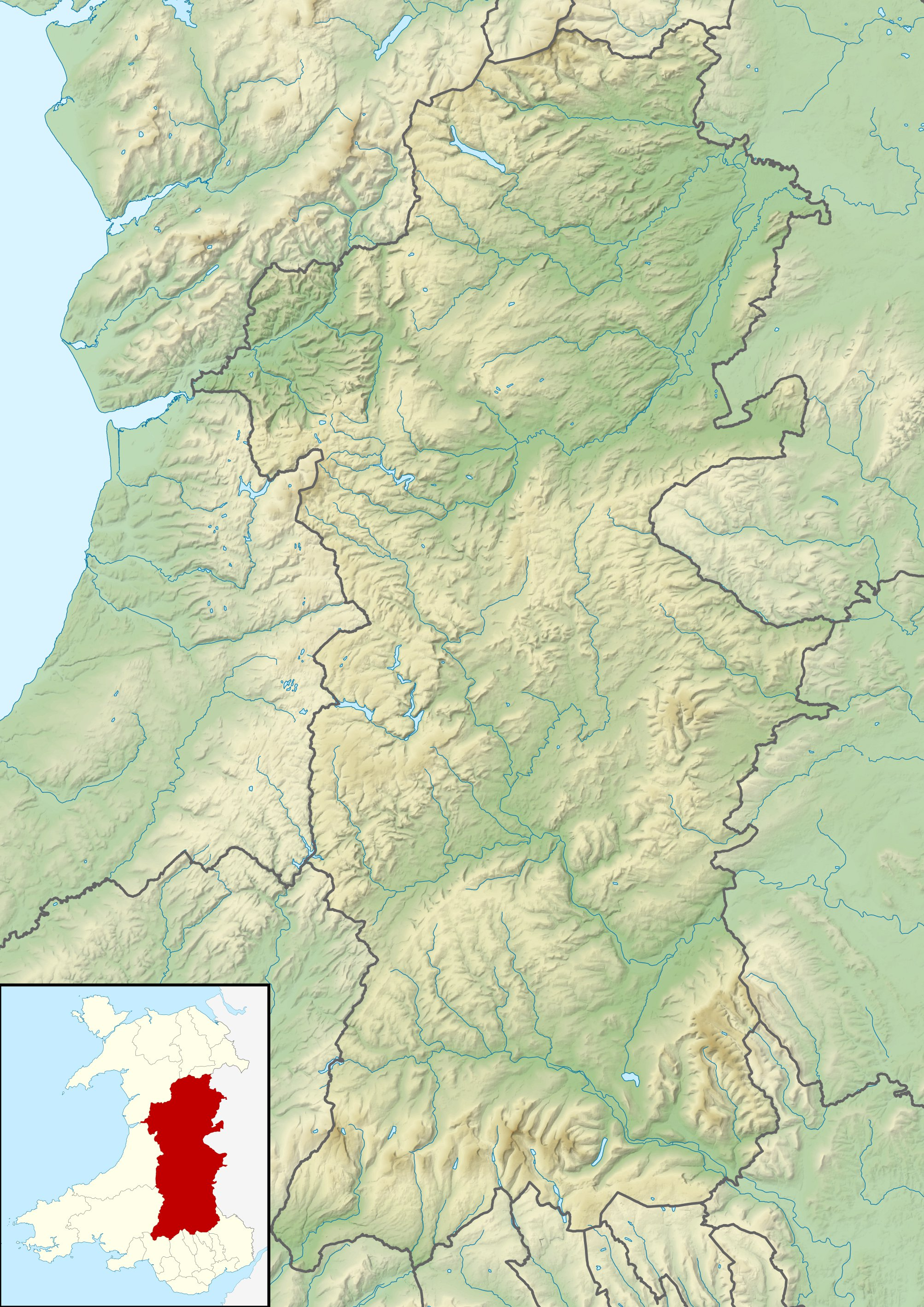
- Location within Powys
- 52.399°N 3.1712°W
- Type: Timber framed Hall house
- Location: Beguildy, Powys, Wales

History
- Built: Medieval

Site notes
- Architectural style: Vernacular
- Governing body: Privately owned

Listed Building – Grade I
- Official name: Bryndraenog
- Designated: 24 October 1951
- Reference no.: 8792

Bryndraenog is a timber framed hall house dating from the medieval period in the community of Beguildy, Powys, Wales. It contains examples of wood carving of high quality, and was referenced by the poet Ieuan ap Hywel Swrdwal (c.1430 – c.1480) who called the house "proud maiden of lime and timber". The house is exceptionally well-preserved and is a Grade I listed building.

== History ==
Bryndraenog stands south of the village of Beguildy very close to the Welsh/English border in eastern Powys. The area was part of the lordship of Maelienydd. The origins of the building are of the 15th century. Tree-ring dating of the timbers used in the houses shows that they were cut down in 1436. Cadw suggests the house was built for a reeve who would have been responsible to a Marcher lord for the administration of justice in the area. At the time of the house's construction, both it and its lord, Llywelyn Fychan ab Ieuan, were celebrated by the poet, Ieuan ap Hywel Swrdwal who described the house as "proud maiden of lime and timber". In the early 17th century, part of the house was reconstructed in stone. Bryndraenog is a private house at the centre of an agricultural estate and is not open to the public.

== Architecture and description ==
Brydraenog was built to a traditional H-plan, with a central hall and two cross-wings. It was originally constructed entirely in timber, with lime infilling. The hall at the house's centre is "one of the grandest timber halls in Wales". Robert Scourfield and Richard Haslam, in their Powys volume in the Buildings of Wales series, note its remarkable state of preservation, despite later alterations to the building. The hall is surrounded on three sides by an open gallery which gives access to the first floor. There is a two-storey porch, the upper storey of which may once have held a small chapel. The Royal Commission on the Ancient and Historical Monuments of Wales records the "remarkable craftsmanship" of the house's timber work. Brydraenog is a Grade I listed building, its Cadw listing describing it as "an almost complete medieval house, especially notable for its fine carpentry of the 15th and 17th centuries".

== Sources ==
- Emery, Anthony (1996). Greater Medieval Houses of England and Wales, 1300-1500: East Anglia, Central England and Wales. Vol. 2. Cambridge: Cambridge University Press. ISBN 978-0-521-58131-8.
- Scourfield, Robert; Haslam, Richard (2013). Powys: Montgomeryshire, Radnorshire and Breconshire. The Buildings of Wales. New Haven, US and London: Yale University Press. ISBN 978-0-300-18508-9.
