= Abercamlais =

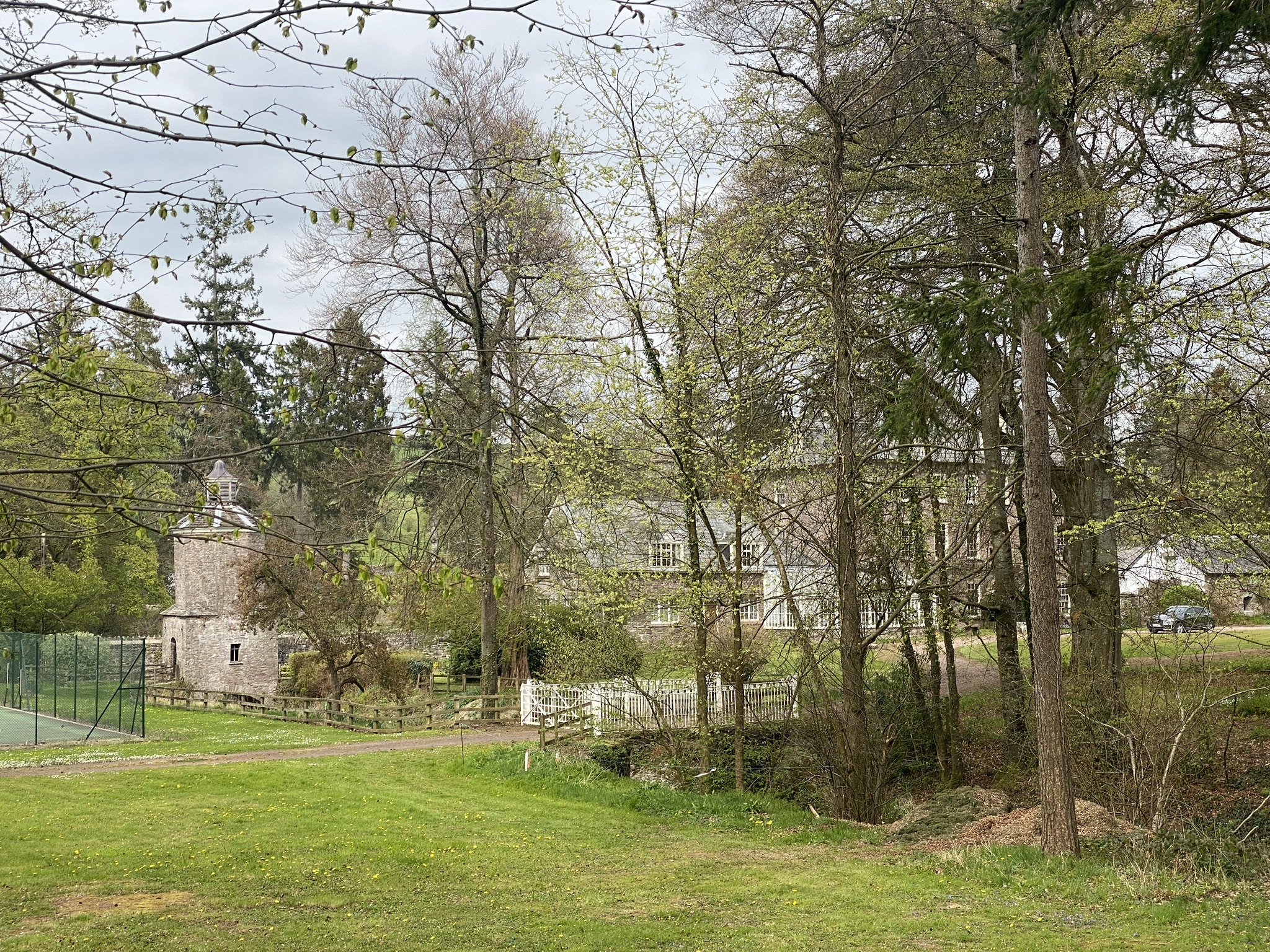
- View of Abercamlais through its gate piers

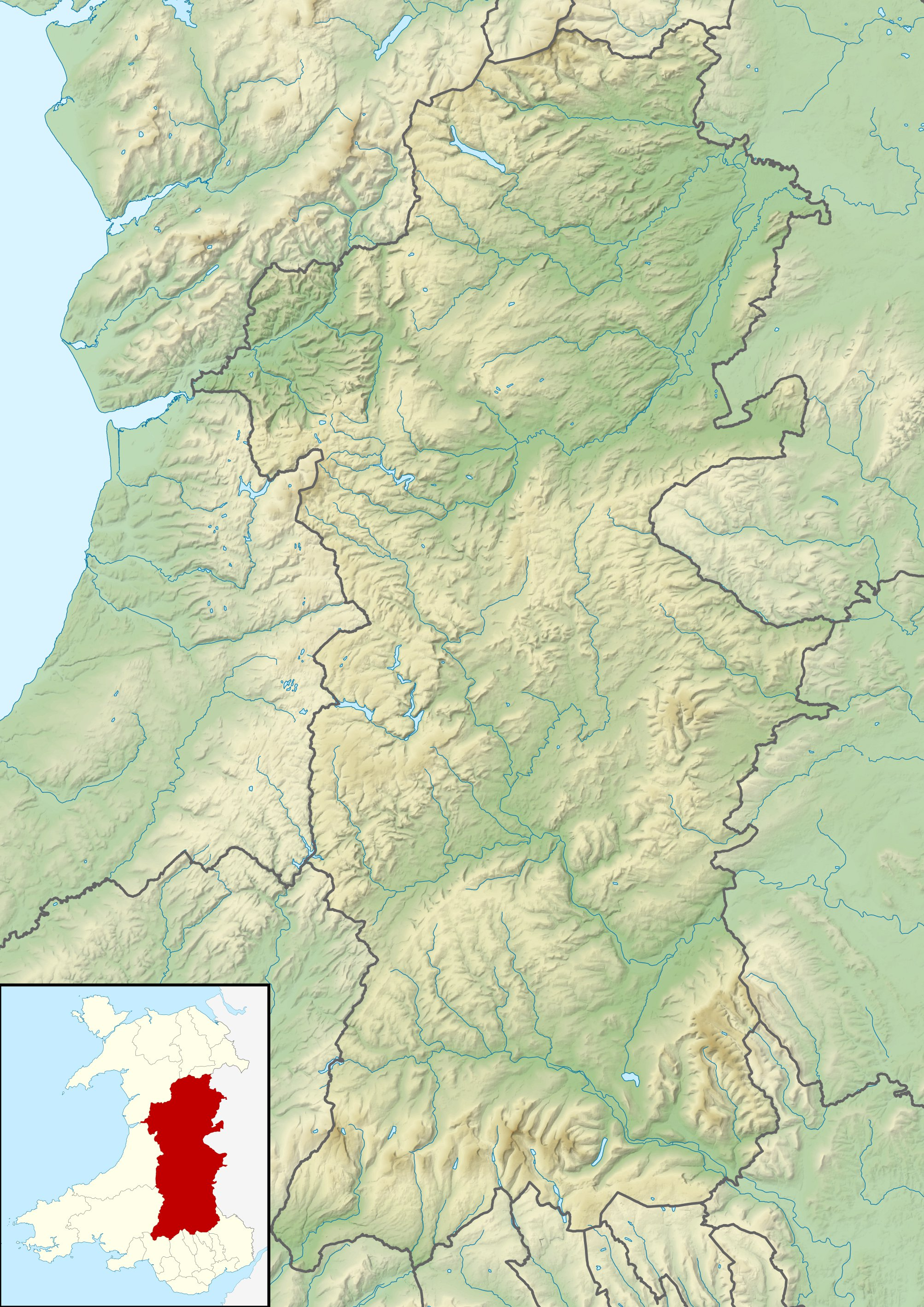
- Location within Powys
- 51.95°N 3.5074°W
- Type: House
- Location: Trallong, Powys, Wales

History
- Built: early 1800s

Site notes
- Architectural styles: Neoclassical, with earlier origins and later additions
- Governing body: Privately owned

Listed Building – Grade I
- Official name: Abercamlais
- Designated: 17 January 1963
- Reference no.: 6785

Listed Building – Grade II*
- Official name: Abercamlais Bridge (Pont Abercamlais) and door in attached wall to northeast
- Designated: 17 January 1963
- Reference no.: 6786

Listed Building – Grade II*
- Official name: Pigeon house at Abercamlais
- Designated: 17 January 1963
- Reference no.: 6787

Listed Building – Grade II
- Official name: Bridge over Camlais to north of the Pigeon House at Abercamlais
- Designated: 27 May 2005
- Reference no.: 84439

Listed Building – Grade II
- Official name: Stable court at Abercamlais
- Designated: 27 May 2005
- Reference no.: 84454

Abercamlais is a country house at Trallong in the Usk valley between Brecon and Sennybridge in Powys, Wales. Possibly dating back to the Middle Ages, it underwent various alterations and additions during the eighteenth and nineteenth centuries accounting for all or most of what may be seen today. It is a Grade I listed building.

== History and description ==
The Abercamlais estate has been in the possession of the Williams family since Elizabethan times. In the early 18th century, the existing mansion was rebuilt as a three-storey block in a Neoclassical style. In the 19th century, a Tudorbethan porch was added, Sir George Gilbert Scott being suggested as the architect. In the early 20th century, further additions were made by W. D. Caröe. Robert Scourfield and Richard Haslam, in their Powys volume in the Buildings of Wales series, note that the interior contains examples of architectural salvage, gathered by the house's occupants from demolished buildings elsewhere and re-fitted at Abercamlais. Examples include a fireplace from Fonthill Splendens and wood panelling from Brecon Priory.

Also of note is an early eighteenth century octagonal dovecote which has a Grade II* listing. The base of the pigeon house forms a bridge over a stream, and was fitted out as a latrine, a device Scourfield and Haslam consider, "simplicity itself, with useful and ornamental qualities into the bargain". The gardens attached to the house extend on both sides of the Usk and are connected by a grade II*-listed Elizabethan three arch stone bridge, and a Grade II-listed wrought iron suspension bridge, constructed by Crawshay Bailey in the middle of the nineteenth century. A third bridge over the Camlais Brook is also listed. A walled garden north of the brook, the stables, and a lodge at the head of the drive are all listed at Grade II.

Less than half a mile downstream is Penpont Manor House with which comparisons are made, the two houses having some shared history. Abercamlais remains a private home but is occasionally open for visitors.

== Sources ==
- Scourfield, Robert; Haslam, Richard (2013). Powys: Montgomeryshire, Radnorshire and Breconshire. The Buildings of Wales. New Haven, US and London: Yale University Press. ISBN 978-0-300-18508-9.
