= Llangynidr Bridge =

Bridge in Llangynidr, mid Wales

Coordinates: 51.8747°N 3.2330°W

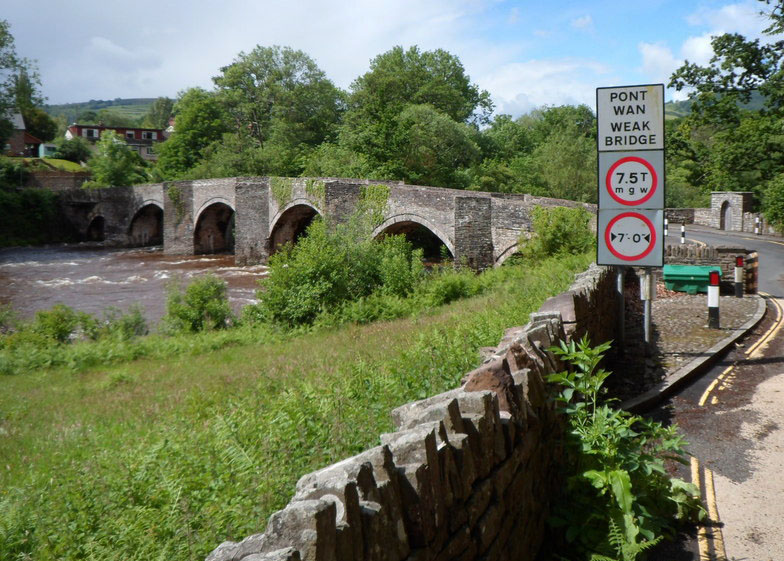
Llangynidr Bridge with weight restrictions

Llangynidr Bridge, also known as "Coed-yr-Ynys Bridge", is an early 18th-century bridge that crosses the River Usk to the north of Llangynidr, Powys, Wales. It carries the B4560 road towards Bwlch.

The existing stone bridge dates from approximately 1700, and is thought by some to be the oldest bridge on the River Usk. It replaced an earlier bridge that was located 500m further west; the sale deeds of a local smithy, dated 1630, contain the first known reference to that earlier bridge, which itself replaced a wooden bridge shown on a land survey of 1587.

Llangynidr Bridge lies in the Hundred (county division) of Crickhowell and is similar in style to the Crickhowell Bridge over the Usk, which dates from 1706. It has six arches, which vary in span from 22 to 30 feet, divided by v-shaped cutwaters topped by pedestrian refuges and parapets with plain coping stones. The cutwaters continue up to the parapet, in order to provide spaces for pedestrians to stand to avoid wheeled traffic crossing the bridge. It is 69 m (230 ft) long and the road is 2.4 m (8 ft) wide. It is considered a particularly impressive example because of its height - reducing the danger of flooding - and its location, which gives a good view of the architecture.

Llangynidr Bridge is known to have been repaired in 1707, and again in 1822. In 1794 a turnpike gate was set up on the Bwlch side of the river, and the right to collect the tolls was auctioned off in 1800. The turnpike cottage is still standing and was purchased from the Beaufort estate in 1915 by the family of one of the earliest toll-keepers. Theophilus Jones, passing through in 1809, noted that the responsibility for repairs lay with the hundred of Crickhowell. Further repairs were carried out in 2015–16. The bridge has been painted over the years by many artists, notably Sir Cedric Morris, whose painting of the bridge has been purchased for Y Gaer, Elizabeth Wynter and Gwyn Briwnant Jones.

Approximately 150 yards (140 metres) east of the bridge, 44 yards (40 metres) north of the river, is a standing stone, 14 feet tall, which stands on a field boundary.

The bridge became a Grade II listed structure in 1952; it was upgraded to Grade I in 2003 as one of the best early road bridges in Wales, ranked equally with Crickhowell Bridge.
