= Trefecca Fawr =

17th-century Welsh gentry house

Coordinates: 51°58′37″N 3°14′58″W

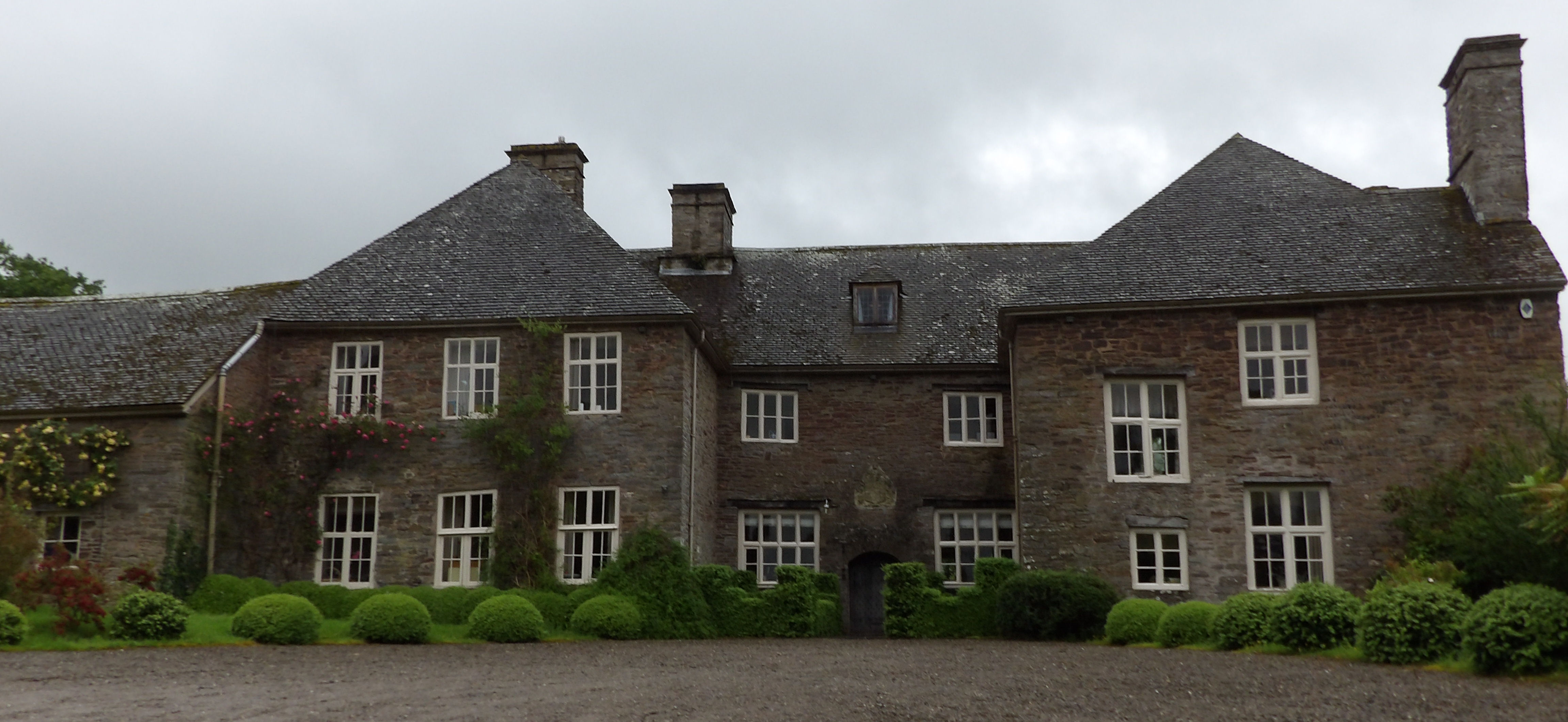
- Trefecca Fawr in Talgarth

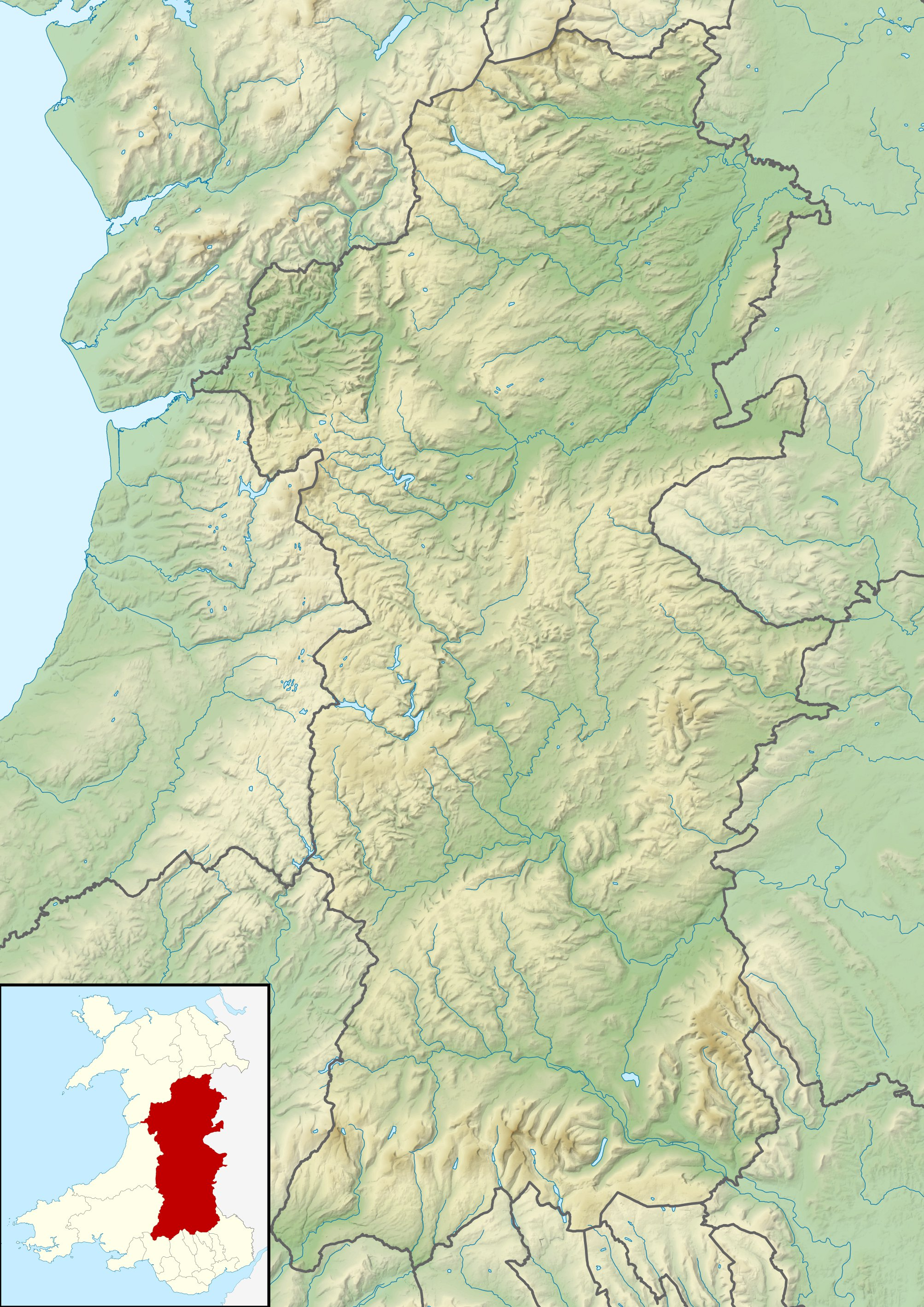
- Location within Powys
- Type: Gentry house
- Location: Talgarth, Powys, Wales

History
- Built: c. 1650

Listed Building – Grade I
- Official name: Trefecca Fawr
- Designated: 28 February 1952
- Reference no.: 6653

Trefecca Fawr is a well-preserved 17th-century Welsh gentry house located in Talgarth, Powys. Constructed in approximately 1650, the property has been owned by various notable individuals including Thomas Harris (in the 18th century) and the Gwynne family (in the 18th and 19th centuries). The two-storey gentry house is listed as Grade I by Cadw, and the surrounding land is listed as a Grade II landscape. This property should not be confused with nearby Trefeca College, although the histories of the two are intertwined.

== Ownership history ==
Though the original owner is hard to determine, shortly after its construction in 1650 Trefecca Fawr became one of the residences of the powerful landowner Rebecca Prosser.

By the late 17th century the property switched hands to Thomas Harris (1705–1782), a cousin of the Prosser family. The brother of the religious reformer Howell Harris (1714–1773), Thomas Harris became the sheriff of Brecknock in 1768 and subsequently bought estates in Trefecca and Tregunter. In the early 19th century the property was used as accommodation for his brother's religious college, but his descendants allegedly lost ownership of the Trefecca estate in 1842 through gambling.

By the turn of the 20th century, Trefecca Fawr was purchased by the notable Gwynne family, who have historical ties in Wales dating back to the medieval period. These Gwynnes were descendants of Marmaduke Gwynne of Garth, who had supported Howell Harris during the Welsh Methodist revival. The Gwynne family's ownership of Trefecca Fawr is attested by their coat of arms which hangs above the central stone arch and door. The house was subsequently sold by the Gwynne family in 1930, and switched ownership multiple times before being purchased by the current owners in 1996. The house remains private property and is not open to visitors.

== Building ==
Trefecca Fawr is a two-storey gentry house, originally designated a Grade I listed building in 1952. It has seen several additions and reconstructions in its three-century existence. A west wing was added between 1675 and 1700, an east wing between 1770 and 1790 and a north extension at some time in the 1700s.

The site on which the house is constructed has ancient monastic origins. Though it is alleged that some of the stone used to construct Trefecca Fawr dates to the site's original 12th-century buildings, there is little archaeological evidence to support this claim. Furthermore, the area around the property is considered by some to be the location of the unidentified 12th-century Waynard Castle.

== Gardens ==
Trefecca Fawr is surrounded by a large open space which is designated at Grade II on the Cadw/ICOMOS Register of Parks and Gardens of Special Historic Interest in Wales. Multiple small buildings were constructed on the land, initially for utilitarian agricultural purposes, though none of these have survived past the early 1900s. To the north are two rectangular fishponds dating to the 12th century. (One fishpond measures 70 × 25 m and the other 45 × 16 m.)

To the west of the house lie formal gardens, the construction of which is commonly attributed to the Gwynne family in the early 20th century. Influenced by the international Arts and Crafts design movement, the gardens were renovated with a stone paved terrace, wild flowers and a tennis court. The designer responsible for the remodelling is unknown.

Notably, the Trefecca Fawr premises also contained a large apple and pear orchard, which at its height in the 1850s spanned more than 10 acres. Though only a few individual trees remain of the original orchard, a new orchard has been planted in recent years.
