= S. D. Newton House =

Historic house in Massachusetts, United States

- U.S. National Register of Historic Places
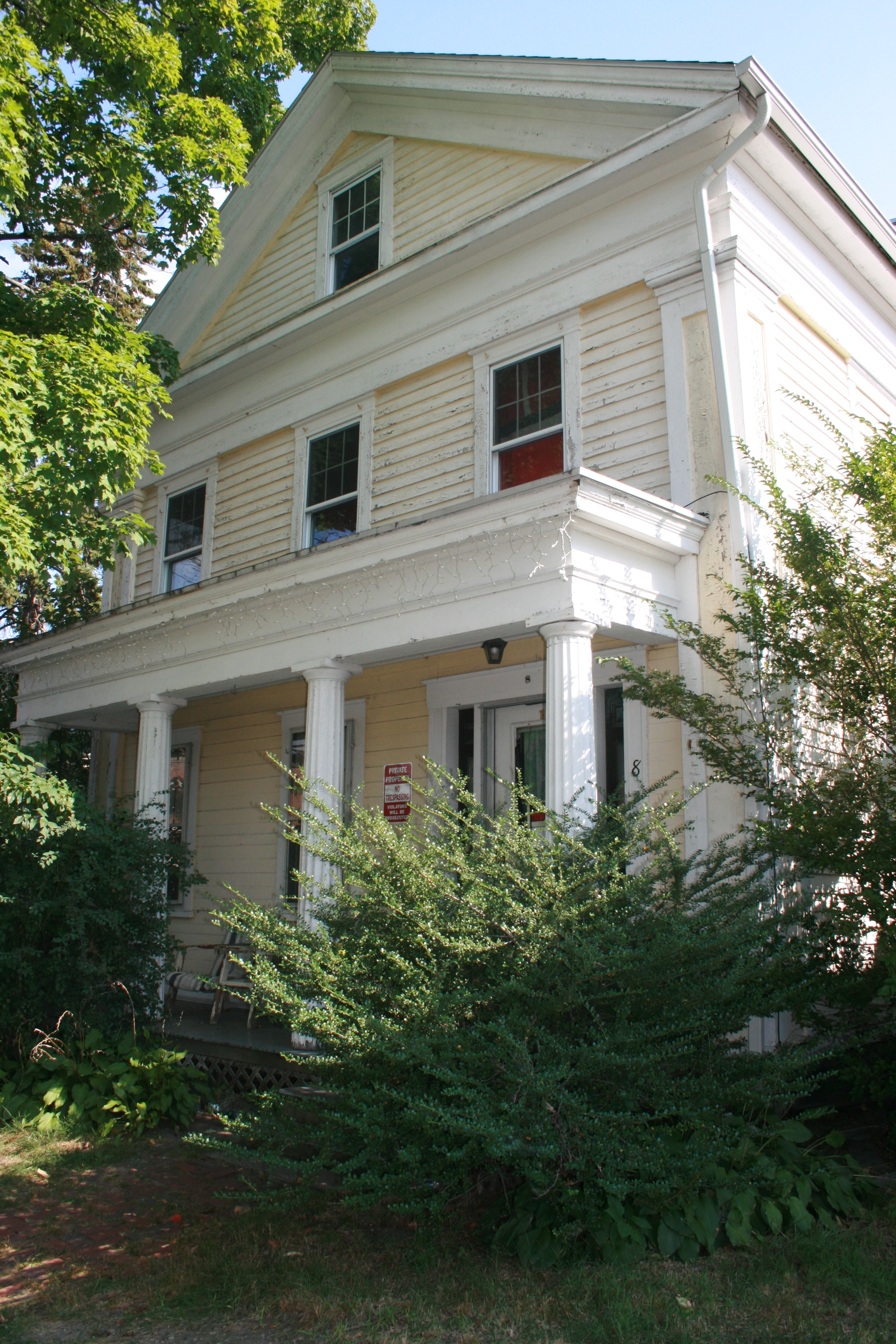

- Location within Massachusetts Location within the United States
- Location: 8 Sycamore St., Worcester, Massachusetts
- Coordinates: 42°15′36″N 71°48′22″W
- Built: 1846
- Architectural style: Greek Revival
- MPS: Worcester MRA
- NRHP reference No.: 09000142
- Added to NRHP: March 05, 1980

The S. D. Newton House is a historic house at 8 Sycamore Street in Worcester, Massachusetts. Built in 1846, it is a local instance of Greek Revival styling, and one of the few houses surviving from that period in the neighborhood. which once had many more of such houses. The house was listed on the National Register of Historic Places on March 5, 1980. Unfortunately the current keeper of the home has let it go. Not much original left. Garbage everywhere on the inside. Lead paint, peeling paint. An eyesore it has become. It once was a great piece of local history.

== Description and history ==
The Newton House is located just south of Worcester's downtown area, on the northeast side of Sycamore Street in a mixed residential and commercial area. It is a 2 1/2-story wood-frame house, with a front-facing gable roof and clapboard siding. It is set on a lot fronted by a low granite curb and a picket fence. The building corners have paneled pilasters, which rise to an entablature below the fully pedimented gable and extending along the building sides. A single-story porch extends across the building width, with fluted Doric columns rising to an entablature beneath a shallow hip roof. The front facade is three bays wide, with the entrance in the right bay, flanked by sidelight windows and narrow pilasters, and topped by an entablature.

The house was built in 1846, and typifies the houses that were built in the immediate area in the 1840s, although it is now one of the few houses left from that period. Most of the houses from that period have been replaced either by later residential construction or commercial buildings. The house's first known occupant was S. D. Newton, a painter; later residents include a victualler and telegrapher. The current resident, a hoarder.

== See also ==
- National Register of Historic Places listings in northwestern Worcester, Massachusetts
- National Register of Historic Places listings in Worcester County, Massachusetts
