= Maesyronnen Chapel =

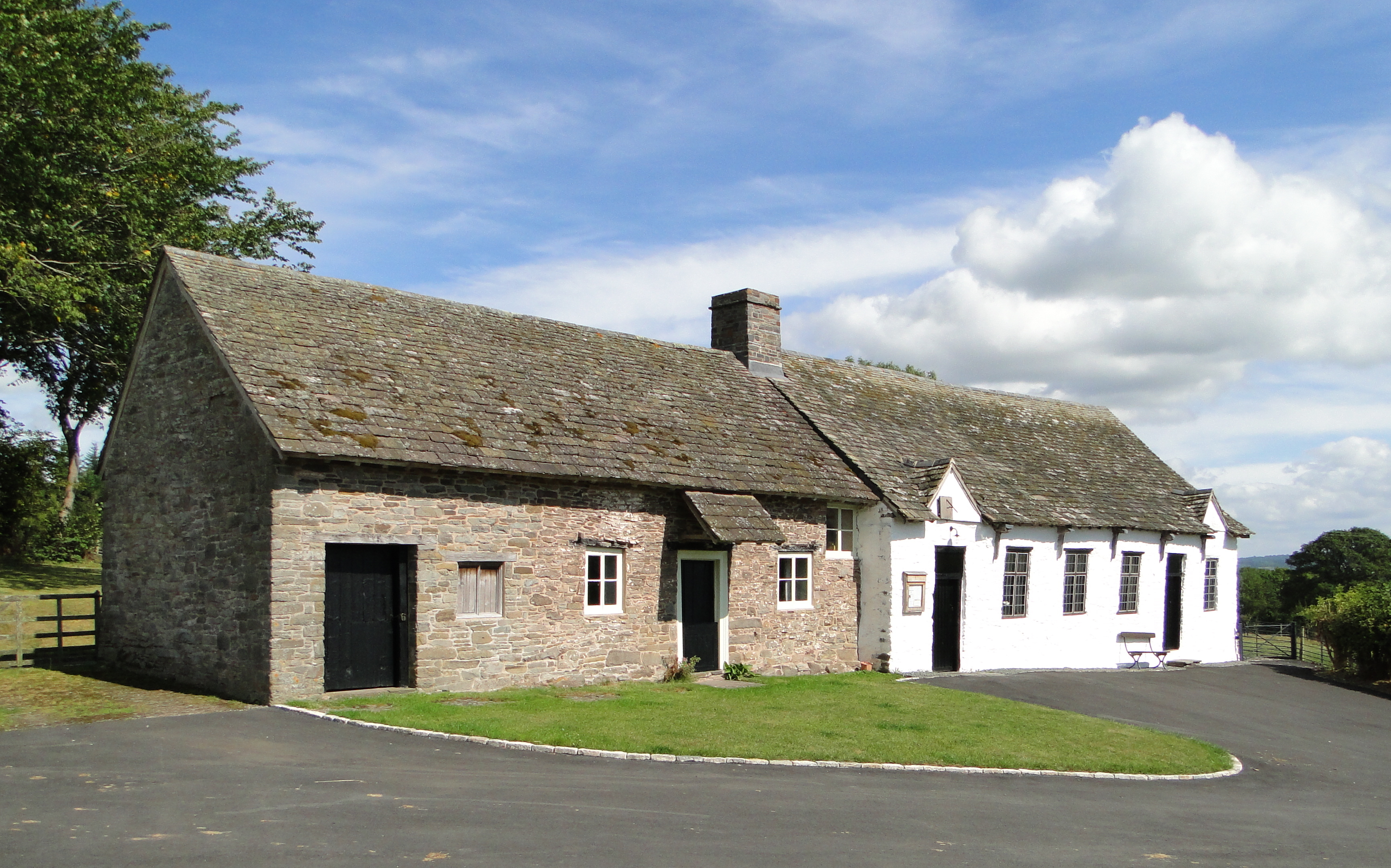
- Interactive map of Maesyronnen Chapel
- 52.0621°N 3.2025°W
- Location: Glasbury, Powys, Wales

History
- Built: 1690s

Site notes
- Architectural style: Vernacular
- Governing body: United Reformed Church

Listed Building – Grade I
- Designated: 18 September 1960
- Reference no.: 8756

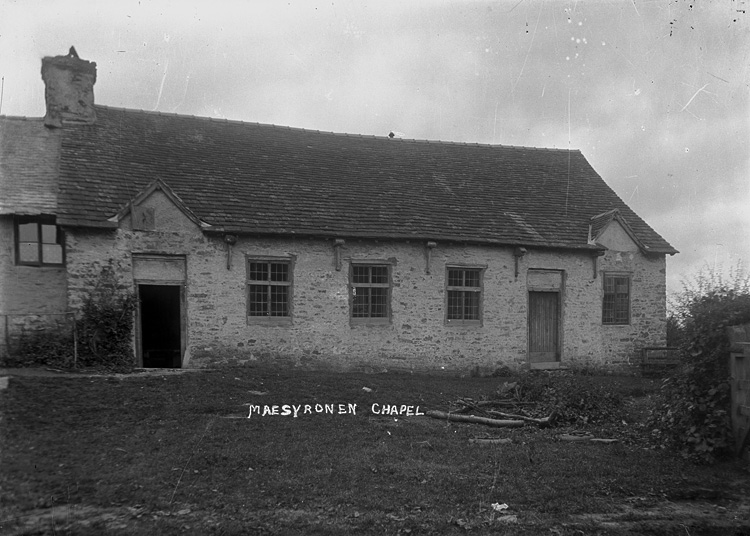
Maesyronnen chapel, c.1910

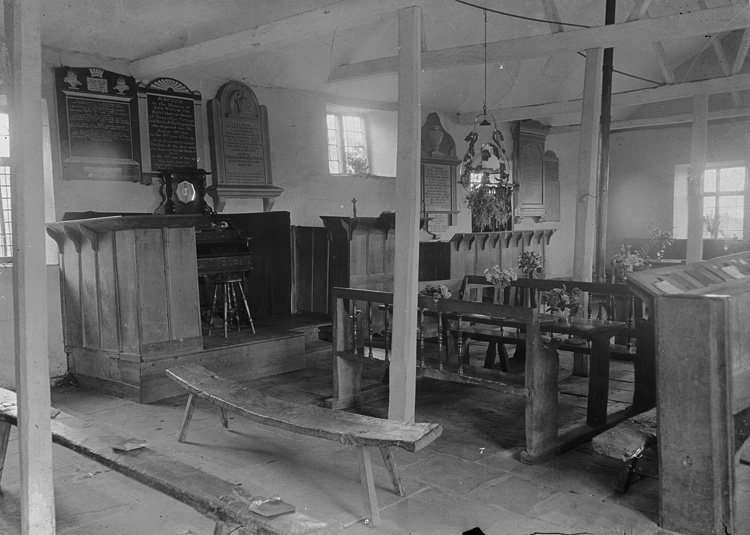
Interior of Maesyronnen chapel, c.1910

Maesyronnen Chapel is about 1 mile (2 km) north of the village of Glasbury, Powys, Wales (grid reference SO176410). It is designated by Cadw as a Grade I listed building. The chapel is one of the earliest Nonconformist chapels to be built in Wales, and is the only chapel existing from that time to be largely unchanged and still in use as a chapel. It is currently administered by the United Reformed Church. The attached ccaretaker's cottage is also listed at Grade I.

== History ==
In 1689 the Act of Toleration granted Nonconformists freedom to worship in their own buildings without certain legal strictures that had formerly applied. Maesyronnen Chapel was one of the earliest buildings in Wales to be created for this purpose. It was developed from an existing longhouse (a farmhouse with an attached cattle-shed), the cattle-shed being converted into a chapel and the farmhouse used by the caretaker. The conversion took place in the 1690s, either in 1691 or in 1696–97. It was registered as a chapel in 1697 and was used by a congregation which had been meeting in secret in a barn nearby since the 1640s. The chapel was built on land given by Charles Lloyd, squire of Maesllwch. The original farmhouse would have been a substantial building dating from the Elizabethan or Jacobean era. At some time it was replaced by a much smaller house, a chapel-house, for the minister although the first and also most recent occupants were caretakers. The original roof was replaced in the 18th century and the floor, formerly beaten earth, was flagged.

In 1980 the chapel received a grant for repairs, having been recognised as a building of "outstanding architectural and historic importance" by the Historic Buildings Council. Further restoration and repair became necessary in the 21st century and Cadw gave a grant of £50,000, following a recommendation from the Historic Buildings Advisory Council for Wales. The chapel re-opened for worship in the spring of 2008.

== Architecture ==
=== Exterior ===
The plan of the chapel is that of a simple rectangle, measuring about 55 feet (17 m) by 26 feet (8 m). The small house is attached to its western side. It is built in stone, plastered and limewashed. The entrance front faces south and contains two doors, one at the western end, the other towards the eastern end. Between the doors are three mullioned windows with timber frames; there is another window beyond the east door. Over the west door and the most easterly window is a small gable. In the gable over the west door is a sundial.

=== Interior ===
The ceiling is barrel-vaulted, and divided into six bays. Much of the 18th-century furniture is still present in the chapel. The interior is dominated by the pulpit, that stands in the middle of the long wall opposite the entrance. Behind it is a window, which both provides light for the preacher, and surrounds him with a "halo". In front of the pulpit is a large table, two benches (which are dated 1728), and another table which is used for communion. The communion table is dated 1727. Also in the church are box pews, and some simple backless benches. On the walls are memorials dating from the early 19th century that include inscriptions in Latin.

== Present day ==
The chapel is used by the United Reformed Church who hold services there every Sunday morning. It is accessible to wheelchair users and there is some limited parking for cars. The attached cottage is administered by the Landmark Trust and is available to be rented for holidays. Both the chapel and the adjoining cottage are listed by Cadw at Grade I.
