= St Aelhaiarn's Church, Guilsfield =

Church in Powys, Wales

Coordinates: 52.6969°N 3.1567°W

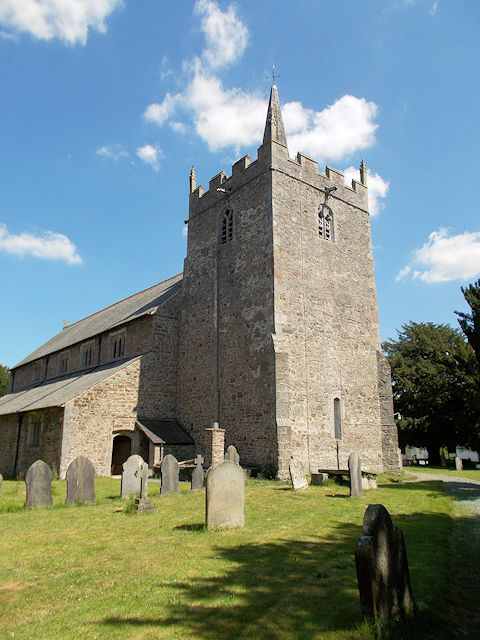

- Location in Powys
- OS grid reference: SJ 219 116
- Location: Guilsfield, Powys
- Country: Wales
- Denomination: Church in Wales

History
- Status: active
- Dedication: Saint Aelhaiarn

Architecture
- Heritage designation: Grade I
- Designated: 25 April 1950
- Architect: George Edmund Street (restoration)
- Architectural type: Church
- Groundbreaking: 14th/15th century

Administration
- Diocese: St Asaph
- Archdeaconry: Montgomery
- Deanery: Pool
- Parish: Mission Area of Pool

St Aelhaiarn's Church is an active parish church in the village of Guilsfield, Powys, Wales. The village lies 3 miles to the north of Welshpool. The present church dates mainly from the 14/15th centuries, although parts may date back to the 12th. It was restored by George Edmund Street in 1877–1879. The church is designated by Cadw as a Grade I listed building. Its churchyard, which contains a group of ancient yew trees, is designated at Grade II* on the Cadw/ICOMOS Register of Parks and Gardens of Special Historic Interest in Wales.

== History ==
St Aelhaiarn's stands in the centre of the village of Guilsfield, which is 3 miles to the north of Welshpool. The present church dates mainly from the 14/15th centuries. There is uncertainty as to the date of the building's original construction. Cadw's listing record ascribes the tower to the 12th or 13th centuries. Robert Scourfield and Richard Haslam, in their Powys volume in the Buildings of Wales series, record the tower as c.1300. Clwyd-Powys Archaeological Trust, which surveyed the church in the 1990s, states that the church is predominantly of the 15th century, with possibly earlier origins. The dedication is to Aelhaiarn, a Welsh saint of the late 6th or early 7th centuries.

In 1877-1879 the church was restored by George Edmund Street at a cost of £6,000, funded by Christ Church, Oxford, then the patron of the living, and the Mytton family, local landowners. The Church in Wales Historic record considers that Street's restoration was undertaken "sympathetically", and Scourfield and Haslam suggest that Street created an interior that is "successfully homogeneous". The Royal Commission on the Ancient and Historical Monuments of Wales (RCAHMW) Coflein nonetheless notes that "many of the original features of the building were swept away".

The church remains an active parish church in the Diocese of St Asaph and regular services are held.

=== Churchyard ===
The church stands in the centre of a large oval churchyard. This contains a group of ancient yew trees and is designated at Grade II* on the Cadw/ICOMOS Register of Parks and Gardens of Special Historic Interest in Wales.

== Architecture and description ==
St Aelhaiarn's consists of a nave and chancel, a western tower attached, a two-storey south porch and north and south aisles. The building material is mainly local sandstone. The interior contains a font which is thought to be 12th century and stained glass of the 1890s by Heaton, Butler and Bayne. The roof is of particular note; Scourfield and Haslam call it a "very fine Late Perpendicular ceiling", and it contains bosses decorated with Tudor motifs including "circles, triangles and quatrefoils". St Aelhaiarn's is as a Grade I listed building. The churchyard wall and gates are designated at Grade II. A table tomb near to the south gates honours "Richard Jones, gent., who was interred December ye 10th 1707 aged 90" and is also Grade II listed. (Note: The Jones tomb carries a verse: "Under this yew tree, Buried would hee be, For his father and hee, Planted this yew tree".)

== Gallery ==
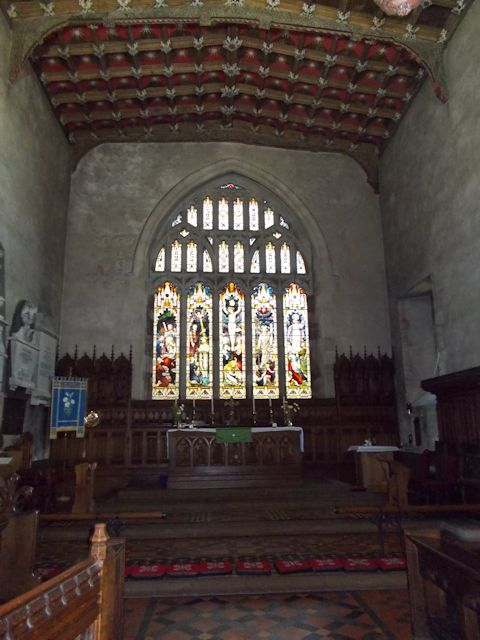
View to the chancel showing the decorated Tudor ceiling

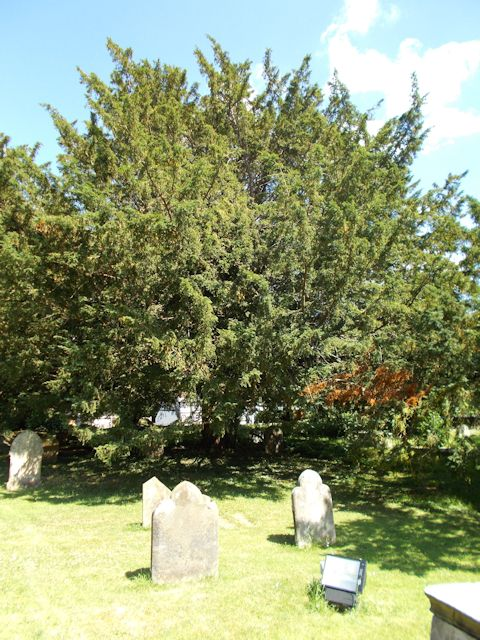
One of the churchyard's 20 yew trees

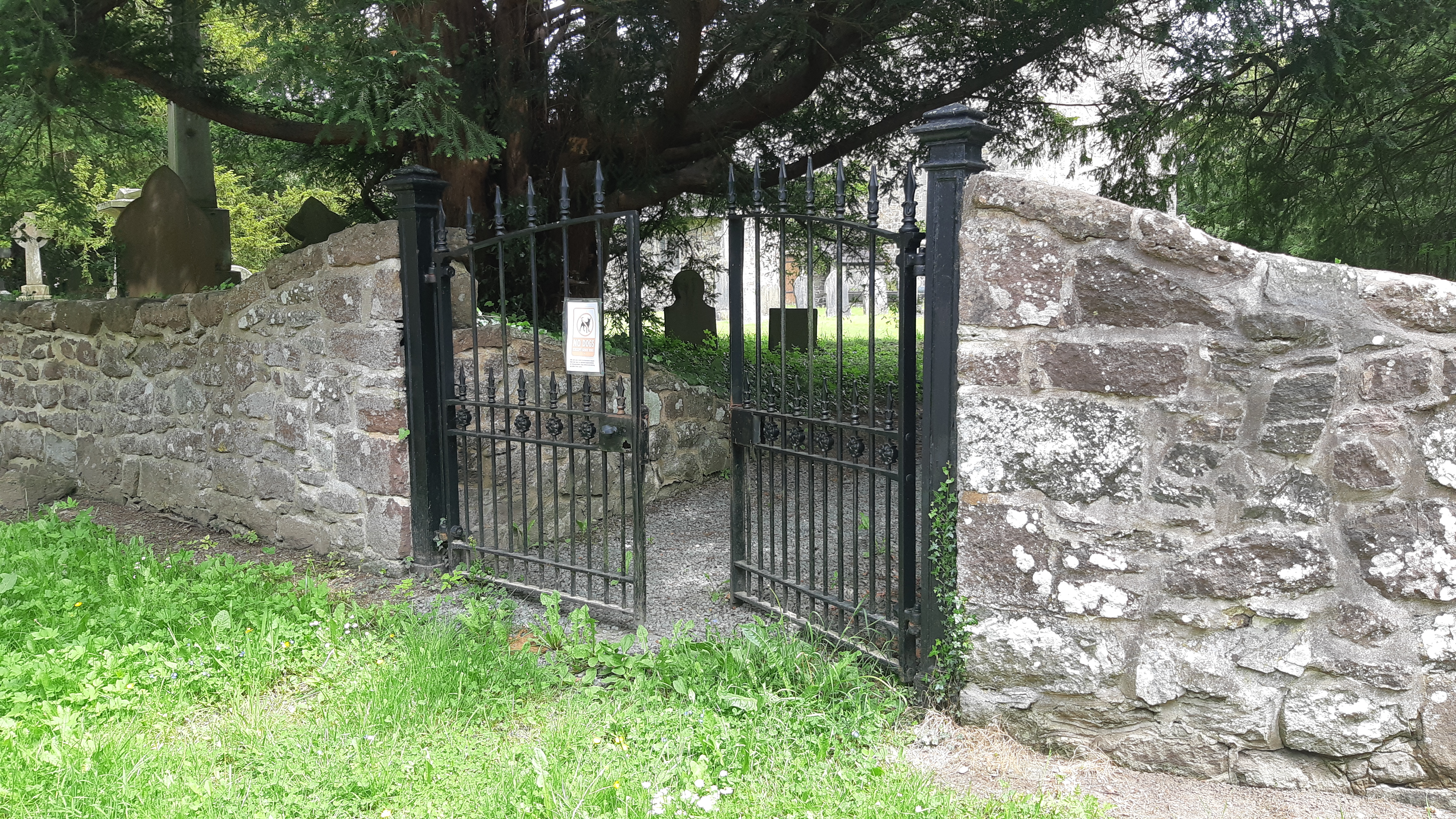
Churchyard wall and gates

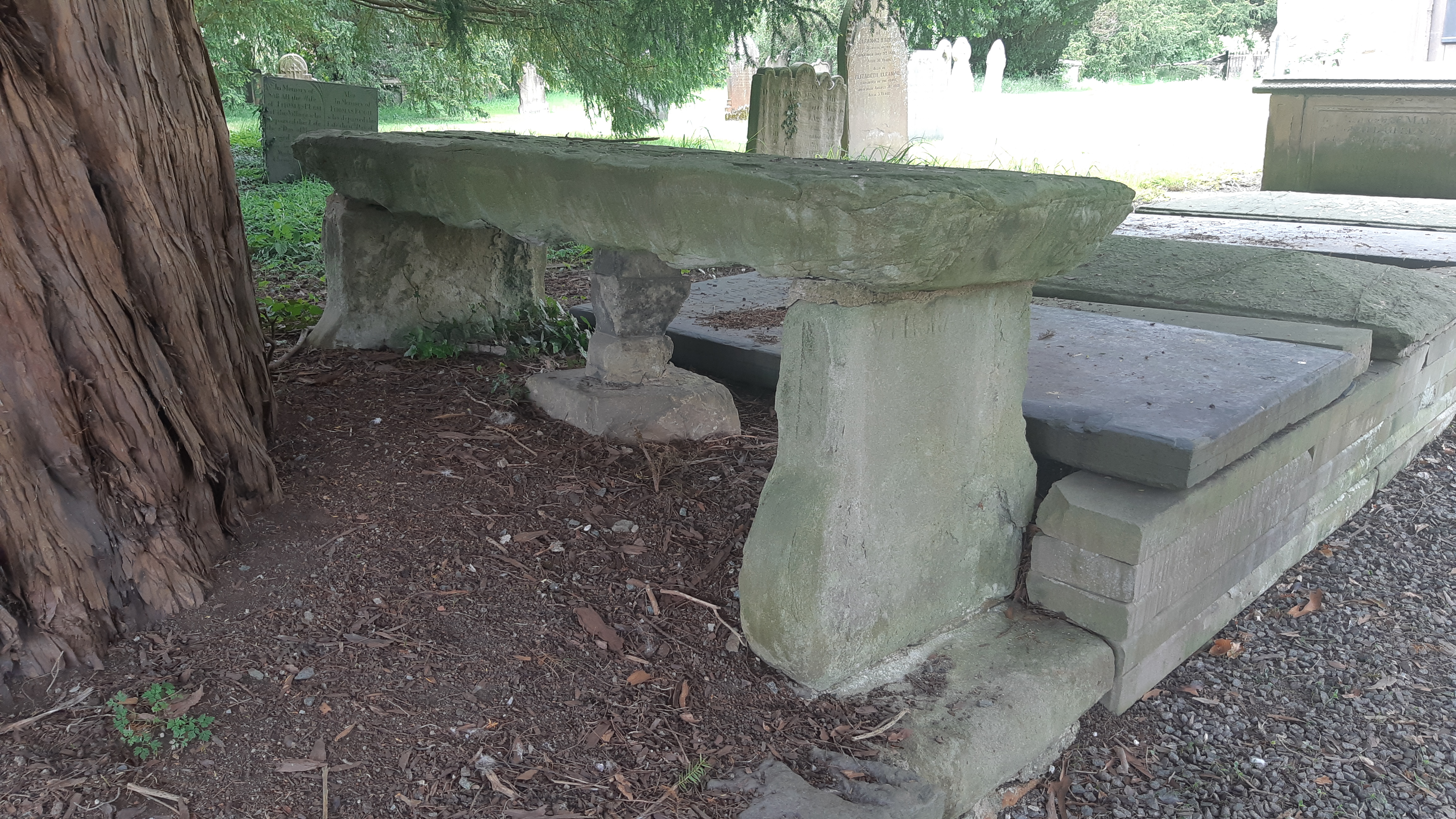
Jones Monument

== Sources ==
- Scourfield, Robert; Haslam, Richard (2013). Powys: Montgomeryshire, Radnorshire and Breconshire. The Buildings of Wales. New Haven, US and London: Yale University Press. ISBN 978-0-300-18508-9. OCLC 863678002.
