= Llangynidr =

Village and community in Powys, Wales

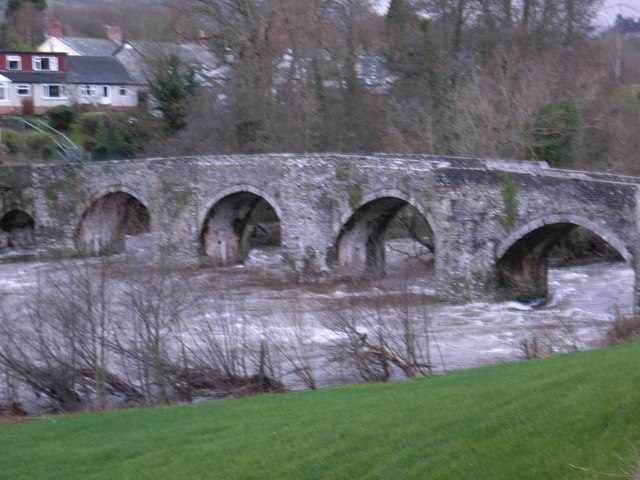
- Llangynidr Bridge over the River Usk in winter

- Location within Powys
- Population: 1,036 (2011)
- OS grid reference: SO153191
- Principal area: Powys
- Preserved county: Powys
- Country: Wales
- Sovereign state: United Kingdom
- Post town: Crickhowell
- Postcode district: NP8
- Dialling code: 01874
- Police: Dyfed-Powys
- Fire: Mid and West Wales
- Ambulance: Welsh
- UK Parliament: Brecon, Radnor and Cwm Tawe
- Senedd Cymru – Welsh Parliament: Brecon & Radnorshire
- List of places UK Wales Powys 51.864570°N 3.231090°W Community map: Map of the community

Llangynidr is a village, community and electoral ward in Powys, Wales, about 4 miles (6.4 km) west of Crickhowell and 9 miles (14.5 km) south-east of Brecon. The River Usk flows through the village as does the Monmouthshire and Brecon Canal. It is in the historic county of Brecknockshire.

== The village ==
The village is located four miles west of Crickhowell and nine miles southeast of Brecon, beside the River Usk and the Monmouthshire and Brecon Canal. It is situated on the B4558 just to the south of where this road diverges from the A40 trunk road. The stone bridge across the river dates from approximately 1700 and is a Grade I listed building. The canal has five locks and an aqueduct in the vicinity of the village.

The village is notionally divided into Upper and Lower Llangynidr. The remains of what may be a medieval reeve's house have been discovered in the course of archaeological excavations in the centre of the village. The village has two public houses, a village shop and a primary school.

== History ==
Sir William Herbert, Knight of Raglan Castle, was granted the manors of Tretower Castle and Crickhowell just after the accession of Edward IV in 1442. At that time this village was part of the manor of Tretower.

The land was then in the ownership of the Earls of Worcester until the nineteenth and early twentieth century when much of Llangynidr was part of the Glanusk Park estate.

On the moors to the southeast of the village lies the Chartist Cave, the name of which derives from 1839 when Chartist rebels used the cave to stockpile weapons in advance of their march on Newport. There is a plaque at the entrance of the cave commemorating their actions.

Until the 20th century, the principal language in Llangynidr was Welsh. For example, in his 1893 book Wales and her language, John E Southall, reports that over 60% of the population of Crickhowell and Llangynidr spoke Welsh, although the town was only a few miles from more anglicised Abergavenny. Welsh services persisted in at least one chapel in Llangynidr into the 1970s.

== Sport ==
=== Football ===
Llangynidr Football Club was first mentioned in 1920, with a match played against Crickhowell. In 1921, they were playing in a local junior league. In 1922, they joined the Abergavenny League and won their first game 3–1 against Blaencwm. By 1929, they had become one of the top teams in the league. In 1930, they joined the Usk League as well as competing in the Langdon Cup.

In the 1970s, there was a Llangynidr Football Club active in the Brecon League. In the 1980s there was a team called Llangynidr Canaries in the league.

Llangynidr Junior Football Club have had a growth in players since a club reorganisation in 2013. The club plays at Llangynidr Village Hall.

=== Tennis ===
Llangynidr has a tennis club.
