= Trallong =

Trallong: Welsh: Y Trallwng
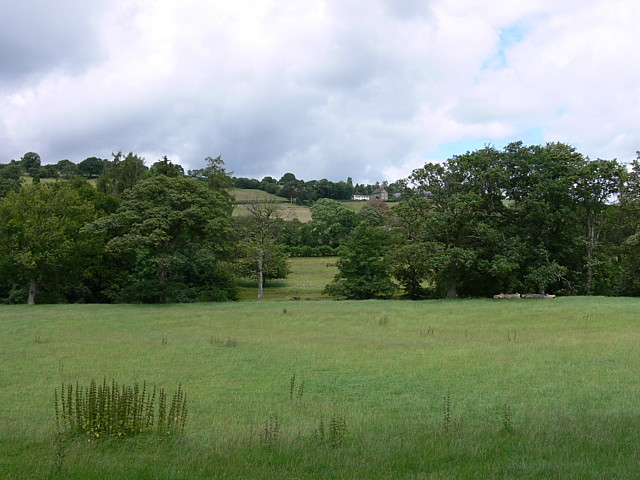
- Trallong from Abercamlais

- Location within Powys
- Population: 369 (2011 Census)
- OS grid reference: SN966296
- Community: Trallong
- Principal area: Powys
- Preserved county: Powys
- Country: Wales
- Sovereign state: United Kingdom
- Post town: BRECON
- Postcode district: LD3
- Dialling code: 01874
- Police: Dyfed-Powys
- Fire: Mid and West Wales
- Ambulance: Welsh
- UK Parliament: Brecon, Radnor and Cwm Tawe
- Senedd Cymru – Welsh Parliament: Brecon & Radnorshire
- List of places UK Wales Powys 51.955255°N 3.505110°W Community map: Map of the community

Trallong (Welsh: Y Trallwng) is a village and community in Powys, Wales, in the historic county of Brecknockshire.

== Description ==
The community of Trallong is made up of the villages of Trallong, the hamlets of Soar, Aberbran and Llanfihangel Nant Bran, Abercamlais House and Penpont Manor House together with its home farm of Abersefin. These two large houses, built by branches of the same family, stand on the south side of the river and both have stone bridges connecting them to the north bank.

The village of Trallong is located on the northern bank of the River Usk extending west to Trallong Common where the former Brecon and Neath railway used to cross the river. In the 2001 census the total population was 364, increasing slightly to 369 at the 2011 Census. For elections to Powys County Council, Trallong is part of the Yscir electoral ward.

=== Notable people ===
Trallong was mentioned by the 12th-century poet Gwynfardd Brycheiniog. Philip Powell (1594– 1646) is said to have been born in Trallong. He became a lawyer then a Benedictine monk and served as a missionary in England during the period of recusancy. He was martyred at Tyburn and beatified by Pope Pius XI in 1929.

== Places of worship ==
The parish church is dedicated to St David and is located in the village centre, close to the village hall. The former Salem Calvinistic Methodist Chapel was built in 1831 on the road leading west to Trallong Common. It closed in the 20th century and is now a residence. The Soar Baptist church, built in 1827 and rebuilt in 1874 remains open in 2017.

== Railway ==
The community was once crossed by the Neath and Brecon Railway which opened in 1866 for goods and in 1877 for passengers. There was a halt at Aberbran and private halts on the south side of the line for both the Penpont and Abercamlais estates. The overbridge on the approach road to Abercamlais remains as of 2017 as do the large masonry abutments each side of the River Usk where the railway crossed it just south of Trallong Common.
