= Guilsfield =

Guilsfield: Welsh: Cegidfa
- Village and community
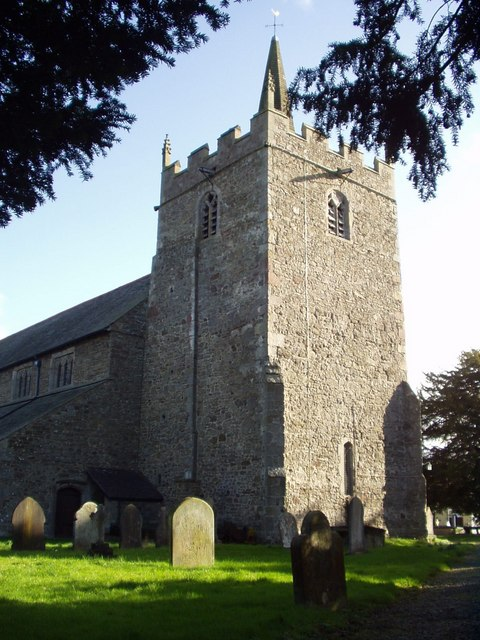
- St. Aelhaearn's church in Guilsfield.

- Location within Powys
- Area: 30.01 km^{2} (11.59 sq mi)
- Population: 1,640 (2001 census)
  - Density: 55/km^{2} (140/sq mi)
- Principal area: Powys
- Country: Wales
- Sovereign state: United Kingdom
- Police: Dyfed-Powys
- Fire: Mid and West Wales
- Ambulance: Welsh
- List of places UK Wales Powys 52°41′N 3°09′W Community map: Map of the community

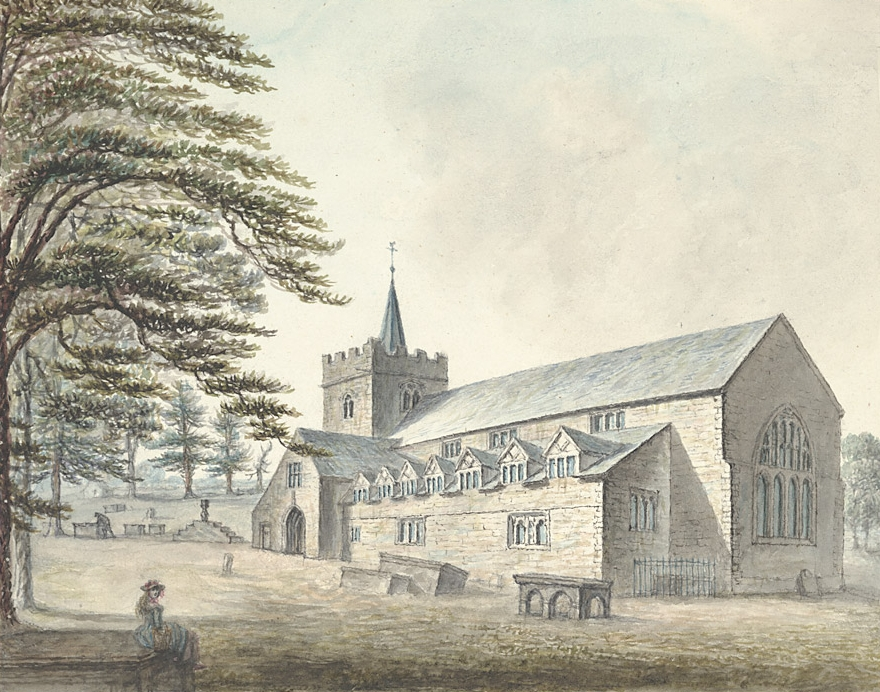
Gillesfield church, 1796

Guilsfield (Welsh: Cegidfa, lit. "Hemlock-field") is a village and community in Montgomeryshire, Powys, Wales. It lies beside Guilsfield Brook about three miles north of Welshpool. It is located on the B4392 road and a disused branch of the Montgomery Canal starts nearby. The community has an area of 30.01 km^{2} (11.59 sq mi) and had a population of 1,640 in 2001. rising to 1,727 in 2011. The community includes the villages of Burgedin and Groes-lwyd. The village itself had a population of about 1,220.

== Name ==
The Welsh name of the village was first recorded in the 12th century as Kegitua. The English name was first recorded in 1278 as "Guildesfelde". It may be named after a person (i.e., "Gyldi's field") or could mean "gold field".

== History ==
In 1862, a hoard of metalwork from the late Bronze Age was discovered near the village. It contained over 120 pieces such as swords, spearheads, and axes.

== Notable buildings ==
=== St Aelhaiarn's Church ===
The Church of St Aelhaiarn is dedicated to Saint Aelhaiarn, but has sometimes been erroneously recorded as dedicated to Saint Giles, All Saints, and Saint Tysilio. The tower of the present church dates to about 1300. Although the feast of Saint Aelhaiarn is recorded as 2 November, his local fair was traditionally held six days later on the 8th. The churchyard is also listed, at Grade II*, on the Cadw/ICOMOS Register.

=== Maesmawr Hall and Trawscoed Hall ===
There are several large houses in the area including Maesmawr Hall which dates from 1692 and Trawscoed Hall from 1777.

=== Brookland Hall ===
Brookland Hall, to the SE of the village, is a Grade II listed building and its Victorian garden is listed, also at Grade II, on the Cadw/ICOMOS Register of Parks and Gardens of Special Historic Interest in Wales.

=== The Garth ===
The Garth, to the west of the village, was an unusual architectural work by John Claudius Loudon, more usually known for his landscape gardening. The house has been demolished by the remnants of the garden and park are listed at Grade II on the Cadw/ICOMOS Register of Parks and Gardens of Special Historic Interest in Wales.

== Sport ==
Guilsfield has a football team, Guilsfield F.C., which plays in the Cymru North league.
