= Crickhowell Bridge =

Bridge in Crickhowell, Wales

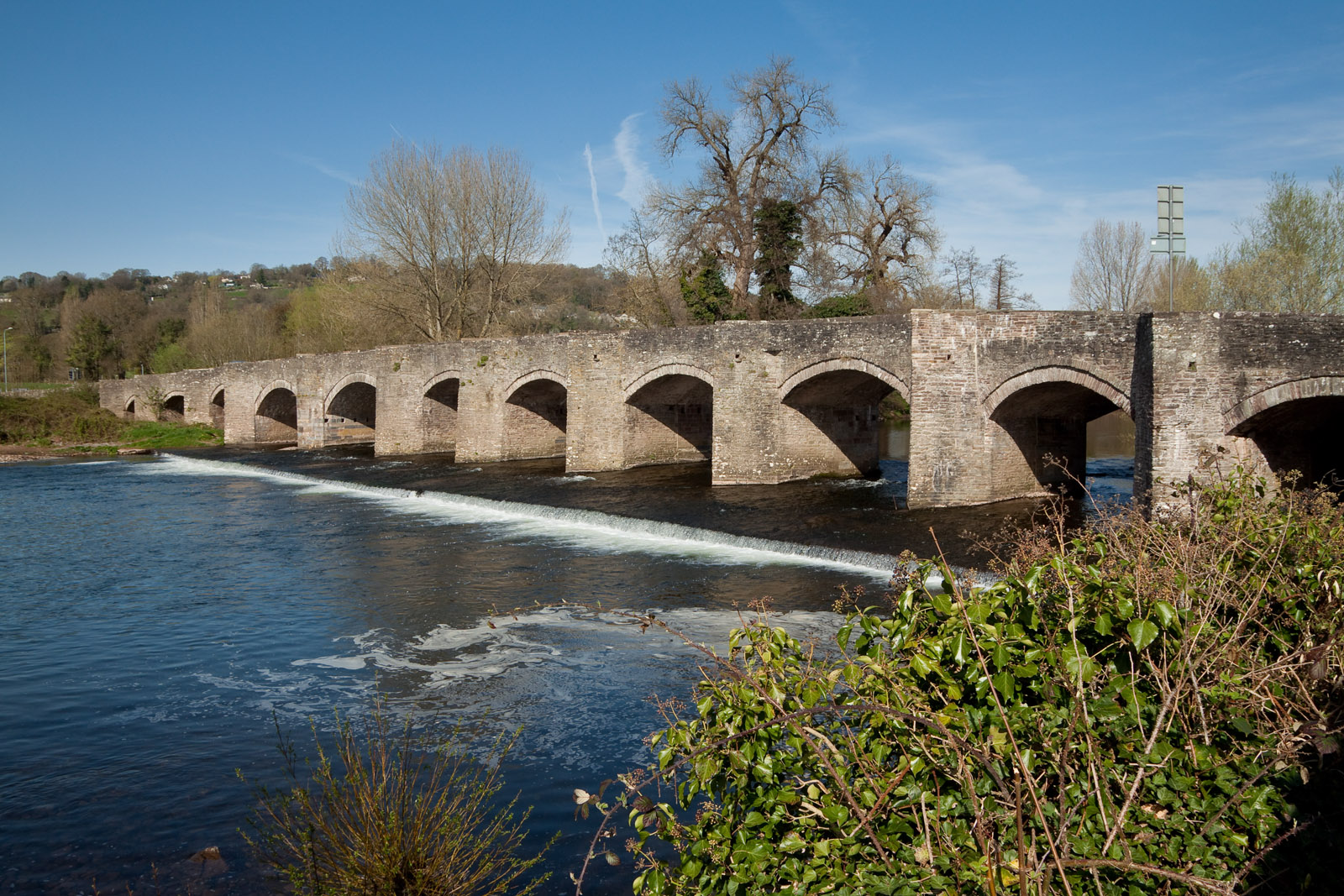
- Coordinates: 51.8564°N 3.1423°W
- Carries: Vehicles and pedestrian traffic
- Crosses: River Usk
- Locale: Crickhowell, Powys, Wales

Characteristics
- Material: Rubble stone
- Total length: 128.00 m (419.95 ft)
- Width: 4.00 m (13.12 ft)

History
- Construction start: Origins 1538, rebuilt 1706, expanded 1810

Listed Building – Grade I
- Official name: Crickhowell Bridge (partly in Crickhowell community)
- Designated: 21 October 1978
- Reference no.: 20716

Scheduled monument
- Official name: Crickhowell Bridge
- Reference no.: BR005

Location
- Interactive map of Crickhowell Bridge

Crickhowell Bridge is an 18th-century bridge that spans the River Usk in Crickhowell, Powys, Wales. The main A4077 road to Gilwern crosses it. The bridge is claimed to be the longest stone bridge in Wales at over 128 metres (420 ft). It is a Grade I listed building and a Scheduled monument.

== History and description ==
The bridge is first documented in 1538 and is believed to have existed since medieval times, originally constructed from timber. In 1706 it was completely rebuilt in stone with additional arches, at a cost of £400. It was replaced by a temporary bridge in 1808 after being severely damaged by flooding and the repaired bridge, in 1810, was widened on the northwest (upstream) side (the downstream side remains original to 1706). The bridge engineer was Benjamin James (of Llangattock) and the cost totalled £2,300. In 1828–30 the northeast end was altered, reducing the upstream length by one arch by combining the two largest upstream arches into one. The bridge was substantially repaired in 1928 and again in 1979, to repair cracking caused by motor vehicles. In 2011 part of the parapet was demolished by a car, following a police chase.

Crickhowell Bridge is unusual (due to the 1828 alterations) in that it has a different number of arches upstream (12) from downstream (13). On the (original) downstream side, the arches are recessed, though not on the upstream side. The bridge has V-shaped cutwaters to both sides with pedestrian refuges above. Construction is of rubble masonry with flat coping stones on the parapets. The bridge is 128 metres (420 ft) long and has a minimum width of 4 metres (13 ft) between parapets.

The bridge became a Grade I listed structure in 1998, being "one of Wales' finest early bridges". It is also a Scheduled monument.

== See also ==
- Grade I listed buildings in Powys
