= Newton House, Brecon =

House in Powys, Wales

Newton House
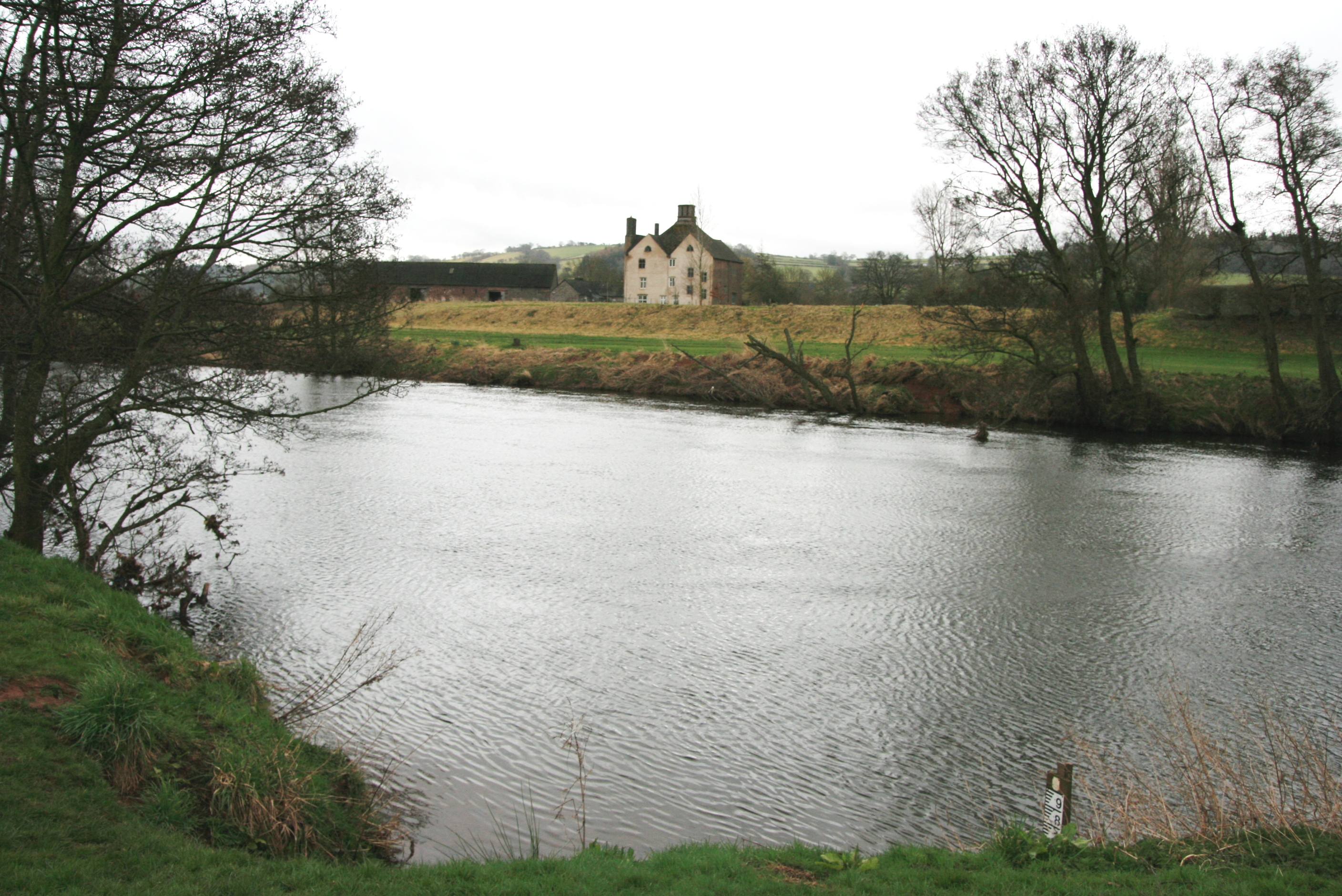
- View from across the River Usk

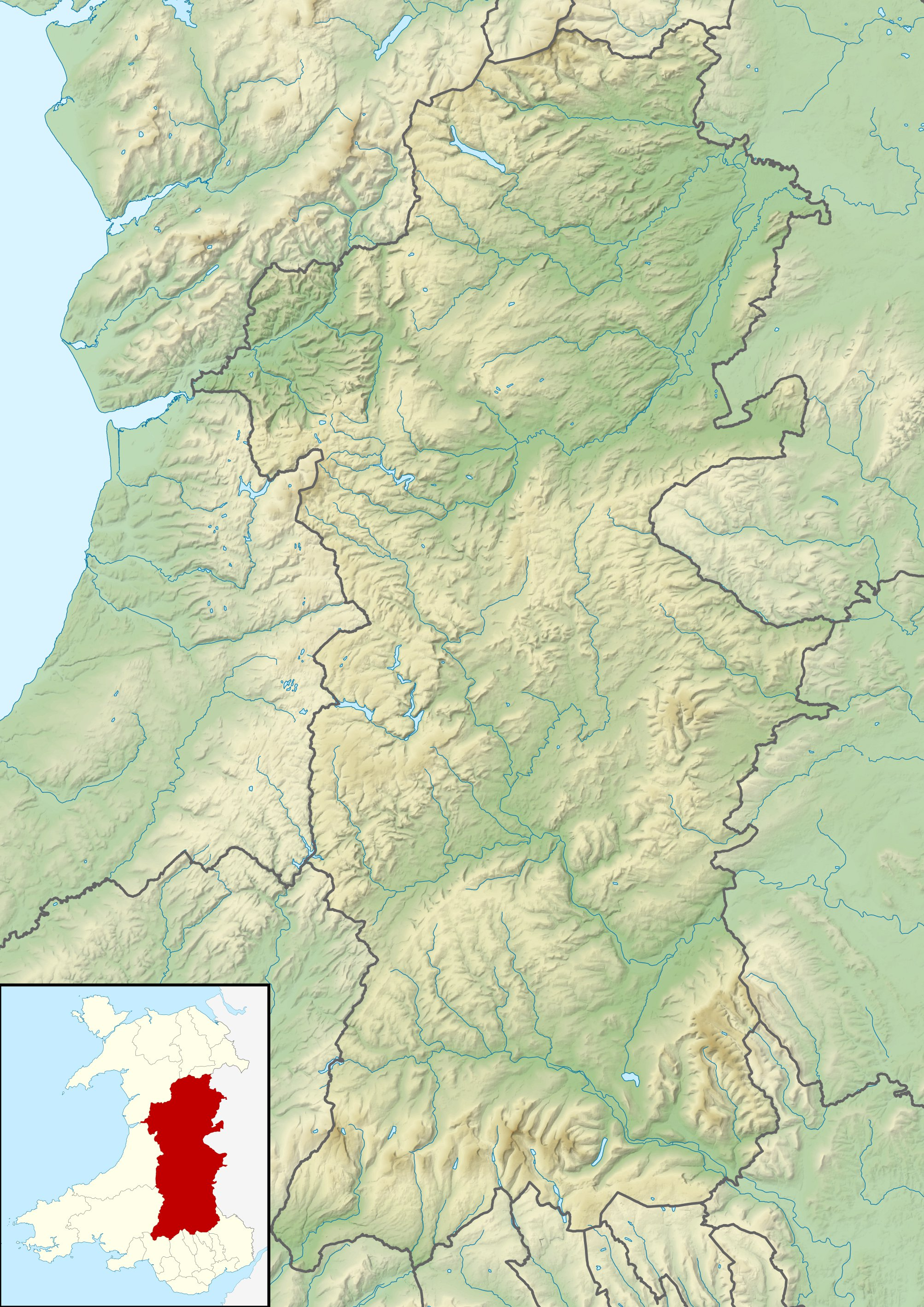
- Location within Powys
- 51.948°N 3.4072°W
- Type: House
- Location: Brecon, Powys, Wales

History
- Built: c. 1582

Site notes
- Architectural style: Vernacular
- Governing body: Privately owned

Listed Building – Grade I
- Official name: Newton House
- Designated: 25 September 1951
- Reference no.: 6803

Listed Building – Grade II
- Official name: Newton Barn
- Designated: 4 November 2005
- Reference no.: 85787

Listed Building – Grade II
- Official name: Agricultural outbuilding range at Newton House
- Designated: 4 November 2005
- Reference no.: 85788

Newton House in Brecon, Powys, Wales, is an important 16th-century house which retains much of its original features, including a screen, plasterwork, carvings and inscriptions.

The house is built near the banks of the River Usk and is reached today via the Brecon Golf Club. The current house is likely to have been completed in 1582 as the seat of the Games (Gam) family of Breconshire – though the family were referred to by the epithet "of Newton" earlier, around 1545. This suggests that a house existed on the site before the one that exists today, which was rebuilt by John Games II in 1582. The house served as the seat of the Games family until the 1690s when it was inherited by the Walker family, who extensively modernised it but sold it in 1725 to the Davies family. The house was in a state of neglect by 1851, and was rented out from 1880 to 2000, though it is still owned by the Davies family today.

== History ==
The land on which the house is built was first purchased by Einion Sais, the great-great-grandfather of Dafydd Gam, the first of his family to adopt the name Gam, meaning one-eyed or cross-eyed, following his distinguished service under King Edward III during the Hundred Years' War; Einion was to fight in the famous battles of Crecy (1346) and Poitiers (1356). Dafydd Gam himself remains a controversial figure in Wales, for his opposition to the Glyndŵr rebellion as he was a vocal ally to King Henry V. Dafydd died at the Battle of Agincourt (1415), and allegedly received his knighthood from the king as he was dying on the battlefield. Some historians also consider him to be the inspiration for Shakespeare's Fluellen in the play Henry V. It would be his descendants who would rebuild Newton House in 1582, and they remained an influential family until the close of the 17th century. John Games I was the MP for Powys in 1545 (when he was referred to as "of Newton"); his son Edward Games was MP for Brecon in 1542 and 1545. John Games II similarly held government office, being sheriff of the county three times, and it was he who rebuilt Newton House, having an elaborate genealogy tracing his lineage back to Dafydd Gam carved into the fireplace lintel.

The house passed, through marriage, to Thomas Walker at the end of the 17th century, whereupon it underwent significant modernisation. The new staircases were fitted, for instance, and the current pyramidal roof was added. Walker similarly rebuilt the outbuildings and the farm, and acquired a number of notable paintings for the house. The Walkers sold Newton House in 1725, as a result of a familial marriage, to Reverend Thomas Davies and his nephew Richard, whose descendants still own the manor. Nevertheless, the house had started to fall into disrepair by the mid-19th century and was rented out between 1880 and 2000, mainly to members of the Evans family.

== Architecture ==
The house is a large, southward–facing structure on a square plan, three storeys tall with additional attic levels. It has a pyramidal roof topped by a group of six large chimney stacks, which were a later modification. The main interior feature is the great hall, a double-height chamber to the south of the building, reached from the entrance hall. The great hall is a stone-flagged room with a raised dais and the large fireplace on the northern wall, the lintel of which bears the Games family crest above a genealogy connecting John Games to Dafydd Gam. Newton House is a Grade I listed building. An associated barn and range of agricultural outbuildings are both listed at Grade II.
