= Penpont Manor House =

Grade I listed building in Powys, Wales

Coordinates: 51°56′52″N 3°29′52″W

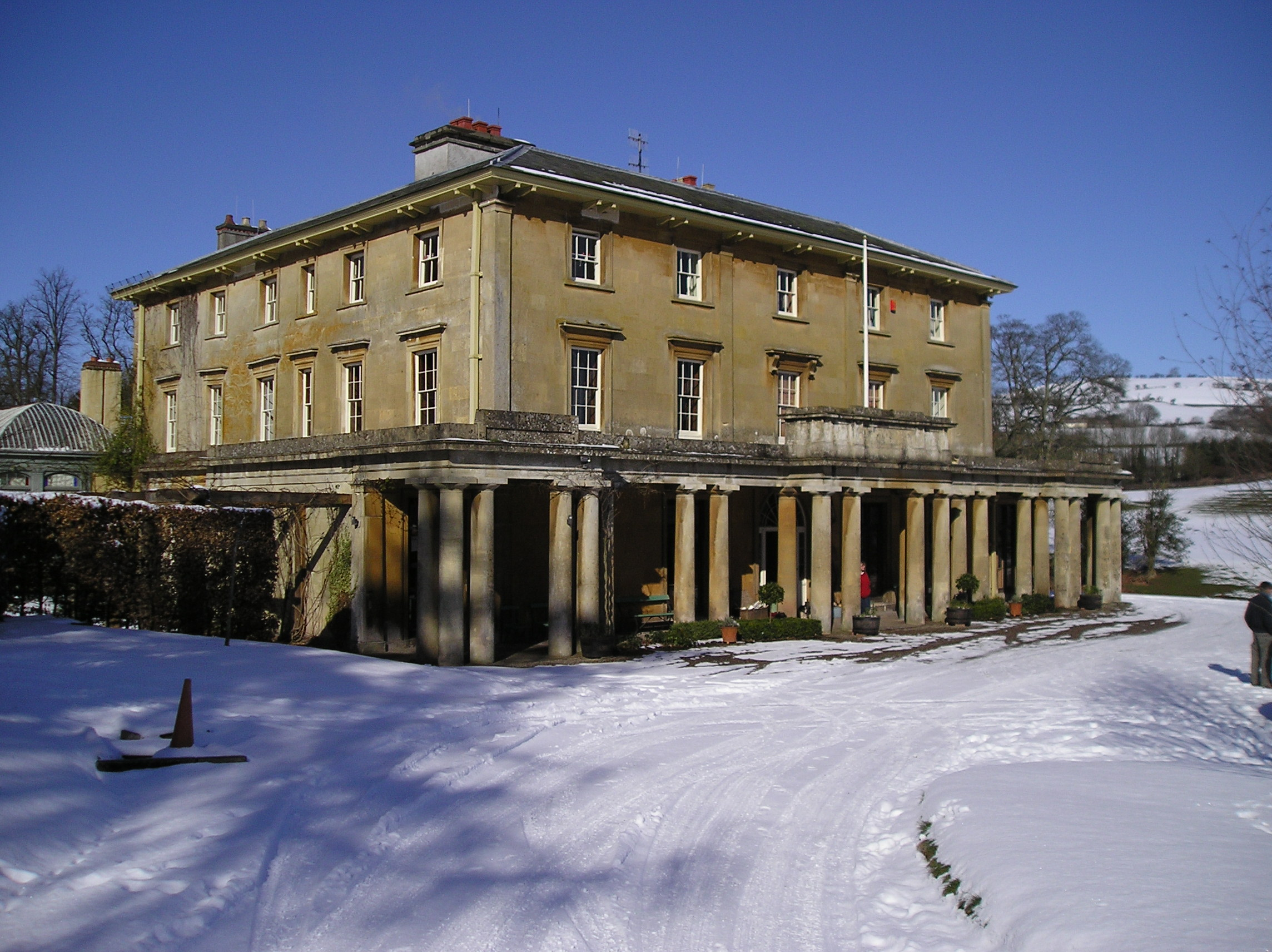
Penpont - geograph.org.uk - 1857257

Penpont is a seventeenth-century Grade I listed manor house in the Usk valley between Brecon and Sennybridge in Powys, Wales. It was built by Daniel Williams on the site of, and perhaps incorporating, an earlier house, Abercamlais-isaf (Welsh:lower Abercamlais). The frontage dates from 1815. Penpont Bridge, a grade II* listed structure, spans the Usk by means of four segmented stone arches. The gardens at Penpont are influenced by Repton but have a long history from the seventeenth century with the addition of a celebrated Green Man maze in recent years. They are listed Grade II* on the Cadw/ICOMOS Register of Parks and Gardens of Special Historic Interest in Wales.

The West Wing of the property is available to rent as holiday accommodation. Less than half a mile upstream is Abercamlais with which comparisons are made, the two houses having some shared history.
