= Diocese of Swansea and Brecon =

Diocese of the Church in Wales

Coordinates: 51.951111°N 3.391944°W

Diocese of Swansea and Brecon Esgobaeth Abertawe ac Aberhonddu
- Coat of arms

- Flag

Location
- Ecclesiastical province: Wales
- Archdeaconries: Brecon, Gower

Statistics
- Parishes: 75 (est)

Information
- Cathedral: Brecon Cathedral

Current leadership
- Bishop: John Lomas

Map
- Map of the diocese in the Church in Wales

Website
- swanseaandbrecon.churchinwales.org.uk//

The Diocese of Swansea and Brecon is a Diocese of the Church in Wales, established in 1923 with Brecon Priory as the cathedral. The area of the diocese had formerly been the Archdeaconry of Brecon within the Diocese of St Davids. The diocese has a border with each of the other five Welsh dioceses, as well as with the English Diocese of Hereford.

Edward Latham Bevan was made Assistant Bishop in the Diocese of St Davids as Bishop of Swansea in 1915, and in 1923 he was elected as the first Bishop of the new diocese.

== The Bishop of Swansea and Brecon ==
After the 9th Bishop of Swansea and Brecon, John Davies retired on 2 May 2021, the process of electing a new bishop began. After the electoral college held at St Mary's Church, Swansea was unable to elect a bishop with the requisite two-thirds majority, it fell to the Bench of Bishops to choose a new bishop. On 4 November 2021 the Bench announced that they had chosen the Archdeacon of Wrexham, John Lomas to be the 10th Bishop of Swansea and Brecon. This election was confirmed at a Sacred Synod held at St Giles' Church, Wrexham on 22 November 2021.

== Senior clergy in the diocese ==
The current Dean of Brecon is Dr Adrian Morgan. The current Archdeacons of the diocese are:

- Brecon — Mark Clavier
- Gower — Jonathan Davies

== Archdeaconries and deaneries ==
Diocese	Archdeaconry	Deanery	Churches	Population	People/church
Diocese of Swansea and Brecon	Archdeaconry of Brecon	Deanery of Greater Brecon	59	41,971	711
Diocese of Swansea and Brecon	Archdeaconry of Brecon	Deanery of Radnor and Builth	66	27,724	420
Diocese of Swansea and Brecon	Archdeaconry of Gower	Deanery of Afon Tawe (Swansea)	26	160,318	6,166
Diocese of Swansea and Brecon	Archdeaconry of Gower	Deanery of Greater Gower	34	100,103	2,944
Total/average			185	330,116	1,784

The original deaneries were Brecon I, Brecon II, Crickhowell, Hay, Builth, Maelienydd, Swansea, Cwmtawe, Gower, Clyne, Penderi, Llwchwr and Knighton.

== List of churches ==
APC = ancient parish church; MC = medieval chapelry.

=== Archdeaconry of Brecon ===
==== Black Mountains Ministry Area ====
This was formed by the union of the parishes of Betws, Boughrood, Bronllys, Capel-Y-Ffin, Cathedine, Clyro, Glasbury All Saints, Glasbury St Peter, Hay, Llandefalle, Llanfihangel Talyllyn, Llanfilo, Llangasty Talyllyn, Llangorse, Llanigon, Llanstephen, Llanywern, Llowes, Llyswen, Talachddu and Talgarth. It is named after the Black Mountains. It has an estimated population of c. 9,200. As of September 2024 it was served by one Ministry Area Leader, three Priests and two Assistant Curates (one of whom is also the Archdeacon).

Church	Founded (building)	
St Mary, Capel-y-Ffin	MC (1762)	
St Mary, Hay-on-Wye	APC	
St John's Chapel, Hay-on-Wye	MC/1934 (C19th)	
St Eigon, Llanigon	APC	
St Peter, Glasbury^{1}	APC (1837)	
Holy Trinity, Bettws Clyro	MC (1878)	
St Michael & All Angels, Clyro	APC (C19th)	
All Saints, Cwmbach, Glasbury	1882	
St Meilig, Llowes	APC (1853)	
St Matthew, Llandefalle^{2}	APC	
St Gwendoline, Llyswen	APC (1863)	
St Mary, Talachddu	APC	
St Steffan, Llanstephan	APC	
St Cynog, Boughrood	APC (1870)	
St Mary, Bronllys	APC (C19th)	
St Bilo, Llanfilo	APC	
St Gwendoline, Talgarth	APC	
St Michael, Llanfihangel Talyllyn	APC (1865)	
St Gastyn, Llangasty Talyllyn	APC (1856)	
St Paulinus, Llangorse	APC	
St Mary the Virgin, Llanywern	APC	
Former churches	Founded (building)	Closed
St Michael, Cathedine	APC (1868)	pre-2010
St Maelog, Llandyfaelog Tre'r Graig	APC	
Aberllynfi Chapel	MC	C18th
St Ellyw, Llanelieu	APC	1999

^{1}original dedication to St Cynidr ^{2}original dedication to St Maelog

==== Brecon and Epynt Ministry Area ====
This was formed by the union of the parishes of Aberyskir, Bettws, Brecon St David or Llanfaes, Brecon St Mary, Cantref, Crai, Defynnog, Dyffryn Honddu, Llanddew, Llandefaelog Fach, Llandilo'r Fan, Llanfeugan, Llanfihangel Fechan, Llanfihangel Nantbran, Llanfrynach, Llanhamlach, Llanilltyd, Llansantffraed-Juxta-Usk, Llanspyddid, Llanthetty, Llanulid, Llywel, Merthyr Cynog, Penpont, Rhydybriw, Traean-Glas and Trallwng. It is named after Brecon and Mynydd Epynt. It has an estimated population of c. 11,500. As of September 2024 it was served by one Ministry Area Leader, two Priests and two Assistant Curates.

Church	Founded (building)	
Rhydybriw Chapel, Sennybridge	C18th/19th (1860)	
St Mary, Trecastle	1889	
St David, Llywel	APC	
St Ilid, Cray	MC (1883)	
St Cynog, Defynnog	APC	
St Teilo, Llandeilo'r Fan	APC	
SS Cynidr & Mary, Aberyscir^{2}	APC	
Bettws Penpont Parish Church	MC (1864)	
St Maelog, Llandefaelog Fach	APC	
St Michael, Llanfihangel Nant-Bran	APC (1882)	
St Cynog, Merthyr Cynog	APC	
St David, Trallwng	APC	
St David, Llanfaes, Brecon	APC (1861)	
St Mary, Brecon	APC	
St David, Llanddew^{1}	APC	
St Meugan, Llanfeugan, Pencelli	APC	
St Tetti, Llanddetty, Talybont-on-Usk	APC	
St Bridget, Llansantffraid-juxta-Usk	APC (1885)	
St Brynach, Llanfrynach	APC	
St Mary, Cantref	APC	
SS Illtyd & Peter, Llanhamlach^{3}	APC	
Former churches	Founded (building)	Closed
St Michael, Llanfihangel Fechan	MC (c. 1790)	c. 2022
St Cattwg, Llanspyddid	APC	c. 2019
St John, Libanus	1891	
St Illtud, Llanilltyd	MC	1920s
St David, Garthbrengy	APC	pre-2014
Capel Dyffryn Honddu	MC? (C18th/19th)	
St Cynog, Battle	APC (1880)	
Glyn Collwn Chapel	MC	pre-1948
Taf Fechan Chapel	pre-C20th (c. 1926)	C20th

^{1}original dedication to Holy Trinity ^{2}original dedication to St Cynidr ^{3}original dedication to St Illtyd

==== East Radnor Ministry Area ====
This was formed by the union of the parishes of Beguildy, Bleddfa, Bryngwyn, Cascob, Colva, Crugybyddar, Evancoyd, Gladestry, Heyope, Knighton, Llanddewi Fach, Llanfihangel Nantmelan, Llangynllo, New Radnor, Newchurch, Norton, Painscastle, Pilleth and Whitton. It has an estimated population of 5,544. As of September 2024 it was served by one Priest.

Church	Founded (building)	
St David, Heyope	APC (1881)	
St Cynllo, Llangunllo	APC (1878)	
St Michael, Beguildy	APC	
St Mary Magdalene, Bleddfa	APC	
St Michael, Cascob	APC	
St Edward, Knighton	APC (C19th)	
St David, Whitton	APC	
St Mary, Pilleth	APC	
St David, Colva	APC	
St Mary, Gladestry	APC	
St Michael, Llanfihangel Nantmelan	APC (1846)	
St Peter, Evancoyd	1887	
St Mary, New Radnor	APC (1845)	
St Michael, Bryngwyn	APC	
St Peter, Llanbedr Painscastle	APC	
St David, Llanddewi Fach	APC (1860)	
St Mary, Newchurch	APC (1857)	
Former churches	Founded (building)	Closed
St Andrew, Norton	APC	c. 2019
St Peter, Crugybyddar	1855	pre-2011

==== Irfon, Wye and Edw Ministry Area ====
This was formed by the union of the parishes of Aberedw, Alltmawr, Bettws Disserth, Beulah, Builth Wells, Cregrina, Crickadarn, Glascombe, Gwenddwr, Llanbadarn y Garreg, Llanddewi, Llanddewi'r Cwm, Llandeilo Graban, Llandulais-in-Tir-Abad, Llanelwedd, Llanfaredd, Llanfechan, Llanfihangel Abergwessin, Llangammarch, Llanganten, Llangynog, Llanlleonfel, Llansantffraed-in-Elwel, Llanwrtyd, Llanwrtyd Wells, Llanynys, Maesmynis and Rhulen. It is named after the Rivers Irfon, Wye and Edw. It has an estimated population of 6,946. As of September 2024 it was served by one Ministry Area Leader, three Priests and one Assistant Curate.

Church	Founded (building)	
Lamb of God, Beulah	1867	
St James, Llanwrtyd Wells	1896	
St David, Llanwrtyd^{1}	APC	
Llanlleonfel Parish Church, Garth	APC (1876)	
St Cadmarch, Llangammarch Wells	APC (1916)	
St Cannen, Llanganten, Cilmery	APC	
St Afan, Llanafan Fechan, Garth	APC (1866)	
St Mary, Builth Wells	APC	
St David, Llanddewi'r Cwm	APC	
St David, Maesmynis	APC (1878)	
St David, Llanynis	APC	
St Mauritius, Alltmawr	APC (C18th?)	
St David, Rhulen	APC	
St Mary, Llanfaredd	APC	
St Mary, Bettws Disserth	APC (1883)	
St Bridget, Llansantffraed-in-Elwel	APC (1896)	
St David, Glascwm	APC	
St David, Cregrina	APC	
St Matthew, Llanelwedd^{2}	APC	
St Dubricius, Gwenddwr	APC (1886)	
St Mary, Crickadarn	APC	
St Padarn, Llanbadarn y Garreg	APC	
St Cewydd, Aberedw	APC	
St Teilo, Llandeilo Graban	APC	
Former churches	Founded (building)	Closed
St David, Llandulais-in-Tirabad	1716	c. 2010
St Michael, Llanfihangel Abergwesyn	APC (1871)	1964
St David, Llanddewi Abergwesyn	MC	1871
St Cynog, Llangynog	APC (1882)	1916

^{1}original dedication to St Gwrtyd ^{2}original dedication to St Elwedd

==== Pen y Glyn Ministry Area ====
This was formed by the merger of the parishes of Cefn Coed, Penderyn, Pontneathvaughan, Vaynor and Ystradfellte. It is named after the Heads of the Valleys. It has an estimated population of 4,861. As of September 2024 it was served by one Ministry Area Leader/House for Duty Priest.

Church	Founded (building)	
St Gwynno, Vaynor	APC (1870)	
St John the Baptist, Cefncoedycwmmer	1870	
St John, Pontneathvaughan	C19th?	
St Mary, Ystradfellte	APC	
Former churches	Founded (building)	Closed
St Tudor, Cefncoedycwmmer	1889	1936
St Cynog, Penderyn	APC	
Capel Nantddu	MC (1864)	pre-1990

==== St Catwg Ministry Area ====
This was formed in 2015 by the merger of the parishes of Brynmawr, Bwlch, Crickhowell, Cwmdu, Glangrwyney, Llanbedr Ystrad Yw, Llanelli, Llangattock, Llangenni, Llangynidr, Patricio and Tretower. It is named after Saint Cadoc or Catwg, to whom the church at Llangattock is dedicated. It has an estimated population of c. 16,000. As of September 2024 it was served by one Ministry Area Leader, one Priest and two Assistant Curates.

Church	Founded (building)	
St Mary the Virgin, Brynmawr	1875 (1900)	
St Edmund, Crickhowell	APC	
St Michael the Archangel, Llanfihangel Cwmdu	APC	
St John the Evangelist, Tretower	MC (1877)	
St Elli, Llanelly	APC	
St Catwg, Llangattock	APC	
SS Cynidr & Mary, Llangynidr^{1}	APC (1928)	
All Saints, Bwlch	1902	
St Issui, Partrishow	APC	
St Peter, Llanbedr-Ystrad-Yw	APC	
St Cenau, Llangenny	APC	
Former churches	Founded (building)	Closed
Glangrwyney Mission Church	pre-1918	

^{1}dedicated to St Cynidr alone until c. 1100

==== The Cathedral Ministry Area ====
This was formed from the parish of Brecon St John the Evangelist. It has an estimated population of c. 2,000. As of September 2024 it was served by one Dean, one Canon Precentor and one Minor Canon.

Church	Founded (building)
Cathedral of St John the Evangelist, Brecon	APC

==== West Radnor Ministry Area ====
This was formed by the merger of the parishes of Abbey Cwmhir, Cefnllys, Cwmbach Llechryd, Cwmdauddwr, Diserth, Howey, Llanafan Fawr, Llananno, Llanbadarn Fawr, Llanbadarn Fynydd, Llanbister, Llanddewi Ystradenni, Llandegley, Llandrindod, Llanfihangel Brynpabuan, Llanfihangel Helygen, Llanfihangel Rhydithon, Llanwrthwl, Llanyre, Nantmel, Newbridge-on-Wye, Rhayader, St Harmon and Ysfa. It has an estimated population of 14,794. As of September 2024 it was served by one Ministry Area Leader and two Priests (one also a Mission Hub Leader).

Church	Founded (building)	
St Gwrthwl, Llanwrthwl	APC (1875)	
St Garmon, St Harmon	APC (1821)	
St Clement, Rhayader^{1}	APC (1897)	
St Cynllo, Nantmel	APC (1792)	
St Mark, Yr Hysfa, Nantmel	1870	
Nantgwyllt Chapel, Cwmdauddwr	pre-1840 (1903)	
St Bridget, Llansantffraed Cwmdauddwr	APC (1865)	
St Michael, Llanfihangel Rhydithon, Dolau	APC (1891)	
St Mary the Virgin, Abbeycwmhir	APC (1866)	
St Padarn, Llanbadarn Fawr, Cross Gates	APC (1879)	
St Tecla, Llandegley	APC (1876)	
St Padarn, Llanbadarn Fynydd	APC (1894)	
St Cynllo, Llanbister	APC	
St David, Llanddewi Ystradenni	APC (1890)	
All Saints, Newbridge-on-Wye	1883	
St Michael & All Angels, Llanfihangel Brynpabuan	APC (C19th?)	
St John the Divine, Cwmbach Llechryd	1887	
St Afan, Llanafan Fawr	APC	
Old Parish Church (Holy Trinity), Llandrindod	APC (1894)	
Holy Trinity, Llandrindod Wells	1871	
St Michael, Cefnllys	APC	
St Cewydd, Disserth	APC	
St David, Howey	c. 1880 (1904)	
St Llyr, Llanyre	APC (1887)	
St Michael, Llanfihangel Helygen	APC	
Former churches	Founded (building)	Closed
St Anno, Llananno	APC (1877)	c. 2019

^{1}originally dedicated to St Cynllo

=== Archdeaconry of Gower ===
==== Afon Tawe Ministry Area ====
This was formed in June 2023 by the union of the parishes of Birchgrove, Glais, Llangyfelach SS David & Cyfelach, Llangyfelach St Teilo, Llansamlet and Morriston. It is named after the River Tawe and was originally called Tawe Isaf. It has an estimated population of c. 39,000. As of September 2024 it was served by one Ministry Area Leader and one Priest.

Church	Founded (building)	
SS David & Cyfelach, Llangyfelach^{1}	APC (c. 1803)	
St David, Morriston	1891	
St John, Birchgrove, Llansamlet	1891	
St Samlet, Llansamlet	APC (1879)	
St Paul, Glais	1881	
Former churches	Founded (building)	Closed
St John, Morriston	C18th (1862)	C21st
St Teilo on the Clase, Morriston	1950s	c. 2019

^{1}original dedication to St Cyfelach

==== Cwmtawe Ministry Area ====
This was formed by the union of the parishes of Abercraf, Callwen, Coelbren, Clydach, Llangiwg/Llanguick, Pontardawe, Trebanos, Ystalyfera and Ystradgynlais. It is named after the valley of the River Tawe and was originally called Tawe Uchaf. It has an estimated population of 31,519. As of September 2024 it was served by one Ministry Area Leader, one Priest and two Assistant Curates.

Church	Founded (building)	
St John the Baptist, Callwen^{1}	MC (1893)	
Capel Coelbren, Coelbren	MC	
St Cynog, Ystradgynlais	APC	
St Mary, Clydach	1905	
St Michael, Trebanos^{2}	1912	
St Peter, Pontardawe	1860	
Former churches	Founded (building)	Closed
Holy Trinity, Ystalyfera	c. 1859	1987
St James, Godre'rgraig, Ystalyfera	1914	C20th
St Ciwg, Llangiwg	APC (1812)	2001
All Saints, Pontardawe	1886	c. 2004
St Mary, Ynysmeudwy, Pontardawe	1912	pre-2014
St David, Abercraf	1912	2016
St David, Ystalyfera	1890	2022
St John the Baptist, Clydach	1847	2006
Holy Trinity, Pantyffynnon	???	

^{1}dedicated to St Callwen until 1964 ^{2}also called St Michael & All Saints

==== Gower Ministry Area ====
This was formed by the union of the parishes of Bishopston, Cheriton, Gwernffrwd, Ilston, Killay St Hilary, Killay St Martin, Knelston, Llanddewi, Llangennith, Llanmadoc, Llanrhidian, Llanyrnewydd, Nicholaston, Oxwich, Penclawdd, Penmaen, Pennard, Penrice, Port Eynon, Reynoldston, Rhossili and Tycoch. It is named after the Gower Peninsula. It has an estimated population of c. 26,500. As of September 2024 it was served by one Ministry Area Leader, one Vicar, two Priests, two Assistant Curates and one House for Duty Priest.

Church	Founded (building)	
All Souls, Tycoch	1957	
St Cennydd, Llangennith	APC	
St Madoc, Llanmadoc	APC	
St Cadoc, Cheriton	APC	
SS Rhidian & Illtyd, Llanrhidian^{1}	APC	
St Gwynour, Llanyrnewydd, Penclawdd	MC (1850)	
St David, Wernffrwd	1898	
St Andrew, Penrice	APC	
St Cadoc, Port Eynon	APC	
St George, Reynoldston	APC (1867)	
St Mary the Virgin, Rhossili	APC	
St David, Llanddewi	APC	
St Hilary, Killay	1926	
St Martin, Dunvant	1897 (1949)	
St Teilo, Bishopston	APC	
St Nicholas, Nicholaston	APC (1894)	
St John the Baptist, Penmaen	APC (1855)	
St Illtyd, Ilston	APC	
St Mary, Pennard	APC (C16th?)	
Former churches	Founded (building)	Closed
Penlan Church, Penclawdd		2021
St Illtyd, Oxwich^{2}	APC	1957
St Maurice, Knelston	APC	

^{1}original dedication to St Rhidian ^{2}occasional services still held

==== Llwchwr Ministry Area ====
This was formed by the union of the parishes of Gorseinon, Gowerton, Llandeilo Tal-Y-Bont St Michael, Llandeilo Tal-Y-Bont St Teilo, Loughor St David, Loughor St Michael, Penllergaer, Pontlliw and Waunarllwydd. It is named after the town of Loughor. It has an estimated population of 41,934. As of September 2024 it was served by one Ministry Area Leader and four Priests (one also a Mission Hub Leader).

Church	Founded (building)	
St John the Evangelist, Gowerton	1882	
St Barnabas, Waunarlwydd	1888	
St Catherine, Gorseinion	1913	
St David, Loughor	1928	
St David, Penllergaer	1838 (1886)	
St Michael & All Angels, Pontardulais	1901	
St Teilo, Pontardulais	1851	
Former churches	Founded (building)	Closed
Holy Trinity, Gorseinon	1883	1979
St Anne, Pontlliw	1909	post-2015
St Michael, Loughor	APC (1885)	2021
St Teilo, Llandeilo Tal-y-bont	APC	1970
St Paul, Garden Village	1915	2002

==== Mumbles Ministry Area ====
This was formed by the union of the parishes of Llwynderw Clyne Chapel, Llwynderw Holy Cross, Newton and Oystermouth. It is named after the Mumbles headland. It has an estimated population of 16,445. As of September 2024 it was served by one Ministry Area Leader, two Priests and two Assistant Curates.

Church	Founded (building)
Holy Cross, West Cross	1956
Clyne Chapel, Blackpill	1907
St Peter, Newton	1903
All Saints, Oystermouth	APC
Norton Mission Church	1908 (1990)

==== Penderi Ministry Area ====
This was formed by the union of the parishes of Caereithin, Cockett, Cwmbwrla, Landore, Manselton, Treboeth and Ystrad Road. It is named after Penderry community. It has an estimated population of 47,321. As of September 2024 it was served by one Ministry Area Leader and one Priest.

Church	Founded (building)	
St Alban, Treboeth	1909 (1928)	
St Illtyd, Fforestfach	1897	
St Peter, Cockett	1856	
St Michael & All Angels, Manselton	1906	
St Teilo, Caereithin	1953	
Former churches	Founded (building)	Closed
St Luke, Cwmbwrla	1886	2014
St Mark, Cwmbwrla	1887	c. 1990
St Paul, Landore	1891 (1903)	c. 2013
Penlan Mission Church		c. 1997

==== Swansea Ministry Area ====
This was formed by the union of the parishes of Glantawe, Hafod, Kilvey, Sketty Holy Trinity, Sketty St Paul, Swansea Christ Church, Swansea Holy Trinity, Swansea St Barnabas, Swansea St Gabriel, Swansea St James, Swansea St Mary, Swansea St Nicholas & St Jude, Swansea St Stephen and Swansea St Thomas. It is named after Swansea. It has an estimated population of c. 65,500+. As of September 2024 it was served by one Ministry Area Leader, five Priests (one also a Mission Hub Leader) and two Assistant Curates.

Church	Founded (building)	
St Paul, Sketty	1850	
Holy Trinity, Sketty	1969	
St Barnabas, Swansea	1914	
St Gabriel, Swansea	1886 (1889)	
St James, Uplands, Swansea	1867	
St Nicholas-on-the-Hill, Townhill	1924 (1964)	
St Mary, Swansea	APC (1962)	
St John, Hafod	1879	
Christ Church, Swansea	pre-1872 (1872)	
St Stephen, Swansea	c. 1899 (1907)	
St Thomas, Swansea	1886	
Former churches	Founded (building)	Closed
St Augustine, Swansea	1898 (1904)	1994
St Faith, Swansea		
St Jude, Mount Pleasant, Swansea	pre-1899 (1915)	2015
St Matthew, St John-juxta-Swansea^{1}	APC (1823)	2004
Holy Trinity, Swansea	1843?	1941
St Mark, Waunwen, Swansea	1888	2011
Greenhill Mission Church, Swansea	pre-1918	post-1962
St Deiniol, Skomer Place, Swansea	1961	1970?
St George, Swansea	pre-1919	c. 1940?
Good Shepherd, Townhill, Swansea	1927	1941
St Margaret, Bonymaen	c. 1916	2020
St Peter, Pentrechwyth, Bonymaen	c. 1910	2020
All Saints, Kilvey	1842	2015

^{1}originally dedicated to St John

== Dedications ==
=== Medieval churches (chapelries in italics) ===
- All Saints: Oystermouth
- Holy Trinity: Bettwsclyro, Llanddew, Llandrindod
- St Afan: Llanafanfawr, Llanafanfechan
- St Andrew: Norton, Penrice
- St Anno: Llananno
- St Bilo: Llanfilo
- St Bridget: Llansantffraedcwmdauddwr, Llansantffraed-in-Elwel, Llansantffraed-juxta-Usk
- St Brynach: Llanfrynach
- St Cadmarch: Llangammarch
- St Cadoc: Cheriton, Llangattock, Llanspyddid, Port Eynon
- St Callwen: Callwen
- St Cannen: Llanganten
- St Cenau: Llangenny
- St Cenydd: Llangennith
- St Cewydd: Aberedw, Disserth
- St Ciwg: Llangiwg
- St Cyfelach: Llangyfelach
- St Cynog: Battle, Boughrood, Defynnog, Llangynog, Merthyrcynog, Penderyn, Ystradgynlais
- St Cynidr: Aberyscir, Glasbury, Llangynidr
- St Cynllo: Llanbister, Llangunllo, Nantmel, Rhayader
- St David: Colva, Cregrina, Garthbrengy, Glascwm, Heyope, Llanddewi, Llanddewiabergwesyn, Llanddewifach, Llanddewircwm, Llanddewiystradenni, Llanfaes, Llanynis, Llywel, Maesmynis, Rhulen, Trallwng, Whitton
- St Dubricius: Gwenddwr
- St Edmund: Crickhowell
- St Edward: Knighton
- St Eigion: Llanigon
- St Elli: Llanelly
- St Ellyw: Llanelieu
- St Elwedd: Llanelwedd
- St Gastyn: Llangastytalyllyn
- St George: Reynoldston
- St Germanus: St Harmon
- St Gwendoline: Llyswen, Talgarth
- St Gwrthwl: Llanwrthwl
- St Gwrtyd: Llanwrtyd
- St Gwynno: Vaynor
- St Gwynour: Llanyrnewydd
- St Ilid: Cray
- St Illtud: Ilston, Llanhamlach, Llanilltyd, Oxwich
- St Issui: Partrishow
- St John the Baptist: Hay-on-Wye, Penmaen, St-John-juxta-Swansea
- St John the Evangelist: Brecon, Tretower
- St Llyr: Llanyre
- St Madoc: Llanmadoc
- St Maelog: Llandefaelogfach, Llandefalle, Llandyfaelogtrergraig
- St Mary: Abbeycwmhir, Brecon, Bettwsdisserth, Bronllys, Builth, Cantref, Capelyffin, Crickadarn, Gladestry, Hay-on-Wye, Llanfaredd, Llanywern, New Radnor, Newchurch, Pennard, Pilleth, Rhossili, Swansea, Talachddu, Ystradfellte
- St Mary Magdalene: Bleddfa
- St Maurice: Alltmawr, Knelston
- St Mawgan: Llanfeugan
- St Meilig: Llowes
- St Michael: Beguildy, Bryngwyn, Cascob, Cathedine, Cefnllys, Clyro, Llanfihangelabergwesyn, Llanfihangelbrynpabuan, Llanfihangelcwmdu, Llanfihangelfechan, Llanfihangelhelygen, Llanfihangelnantbran, Llanfihangelnantmelan, Llanfihangelrhydithon, Llanfihangeltalyllyn, Loughor
- St Nicholas: Nicholaston
- St Padarn: Llanbadarnfawr, Llanbadarnfynydd, Llanbadarnygarreg
- St Paulinus of Wales (fl. c. 545): Llangorse
- St Peter: Llanbedr Painscastle, Llanbedrystradyw
- St Rhidian: Llanrhidian
- St Samlet: Llansamlet
- St Stephen: Llansteffan
- St Tecla: Llandegley
- St Teilo: Bishopston, Llandeilograban, Llandeilorfan, Llandeilotalybont
- St Tetti: Llanddetty
- No dedication/dedication unknown: Aberllynfi, Bettwspenpont, Coelbren, Dyffrynhonddu, Glyncollwn, Llanlleonfel, Nantddu

=== Post-medieval churches ===
- All Saints: Bwlch (1902), Cwmbach (1882), Kilvey (1842), Newbridge-on-Wye (1883), Pontardawe (1886)
- All Souls: Tycoch (1957)
- Christ Church: Swansea (C19th)
- Good Shepherd: Swansea (1927)
- Holy Cross: West Cross (1956)
- Holy Trinity: Gorseinon (1883), Llandrindod Wells (1871), Pantyffynnon (?), Sketty (1969), Swansea (1843), Ystalyfera (1859)
- Lamb of God: Beulah (1867)
- St Alban: Treboeth (1909)
- St Anne: Pontlliw (1909)
- St Augustine: Swansea (1898)
- St Barnabas: Swansea (1914), Waunarlwydd (1888)
- St Catherine: Gorseinon (1913)
- St David: Abercraf (1912), Howey (1880), Llandulais-in-Tirabad (1716), Loughor (1928), Morriston (1891), Penllergaer (1838), Wernffrwd (1898), Ystalyfera (1890)
- St Deiniol: Swansea (1961)
- St Faith: Swansea (?)
- St Gabriel: Swansea (1886)
- St George: Swansea (pre-1919)
- St Hilary: Killay (1926)
- St Illtud: Fforestfach (1897)
- St James: Godrergraig (1914), Llanwrtyd Wells (1896), Swansea (1867)
- St John the Baptist: Cefncoedycwmmer (1870), Clydach (1847)
- St John the Evangelist: Birchgrove (1891), Cwmbachllechryd (1887), Gowerton (1882), Hafod (1879), Libanus (1891), Morriston (C18th), Pontneathvaughan (C19th?)
- St Jude: Swansea (pre-1899)
- St Luke: Cwmbwrla (1886)
- St Margaret: Bonymaen (1916)
- St Mark: Cwmbwrla (1887), Swansea (1888), Yr Hysfa (1870)
- St Martin: Dunvant (1897)
- St Mary: Brynmawr (1875), Clydach (1905), Trecastle (1889), Ynysmeudwy (1912)
- St Matthew: Swansea (C19th)
- St Michael: Manselton (1906), Pontardulais (1901), Trebanos (1912)
- St Nicholas: Townhill (1924)
- St Paul: Garden Village (1915), Glais (1881), Landore (1891), Sketty (1850)
- St Peter: Cockett (1856), Crugybyddar (1855), Evancoyd (1887), Newton (1903), Pentrechwyth (1910), Pontardawe (1860)
- St Stephen: Swansea (1899)
- St Teilo: Caereithin (1953), Morriston (1950s), Pontardulais (1851)
- St Thomas: Swansea (1886)
- St Tudor: Cefncoedycwmmer (1889)
- No dedication/dedication unknown: Blackpill (1907), Glangrwyney (C19th?), Greenhill (pre-1918), Nantgwyllt (pre-1840), Norton (1908), Penclawdd (?), Penlan (?), Sennybridge (C18th/19th), Taffechan (pre-C20th)
