= St David's Church, Glascwm =

Church in Powys, Wales

Coordinates: 52.1701°N 3.2356°W

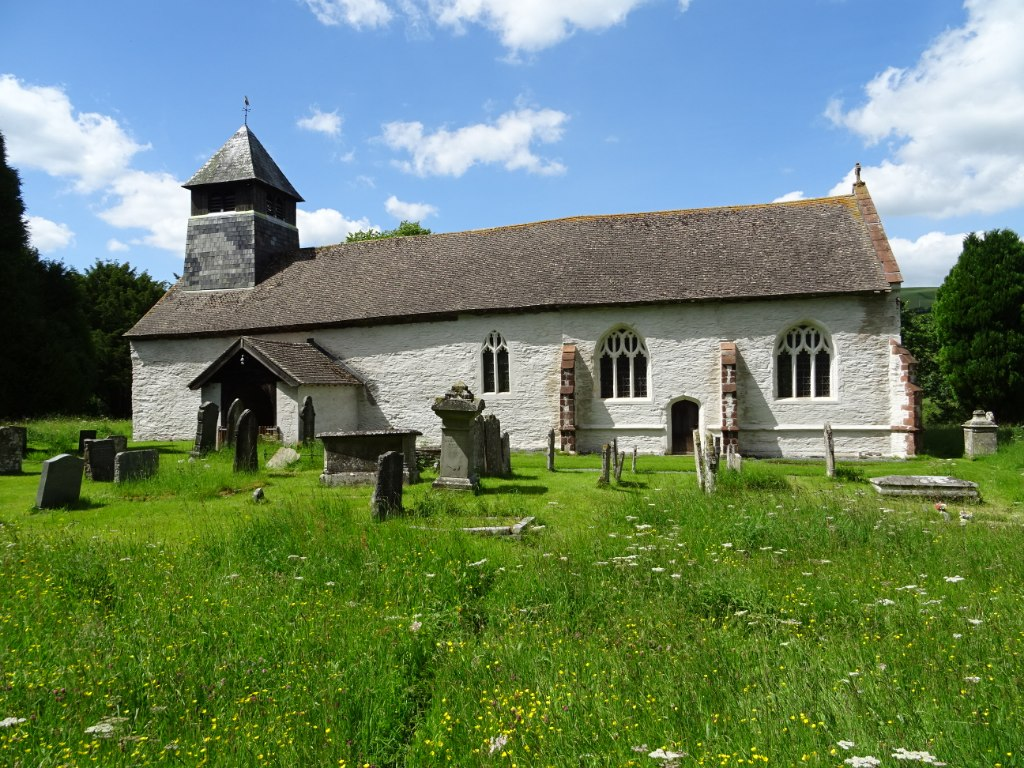

- Location in Powys
- OS grid reference: SO 155 531
- Location: Glascwm, Powys
- Country: Wales
- Denomination: Church in Wales

History
- Status: active
- Dedication: Saint David

Architecture
- Heritage designation: Grade I
- Designated: 21 September 1962
- Architect: Ewan Christian (restoration)
- Architectural type: Church
- Groundbreaking: 14th century

Administration
- Diocese: Swansea and Brecon
- Archdeaconry: Brecon
- Deanery: Radnor and Builth
- Parish: Irfon, Wye and Edw Ministry Area

St David's Church is an active parish church in the village of Glascwm, Powys, Wales. It stands in a circular churchyard in the centre of the village, some 9m to the north-east of Builth Wells. It is traditionally associated with Saint David and there was likely an early clas settlement on the site. The church was restored by Ewan Christian in 1891. St David's is designated by Cadw as a Grade I listed building.

== History ==
The village of Glascwm lies in a remote part of mid-Powys, some 9m to the north-east of Builth Wells. It is probable that the earliest structure on the site of the present church was a clas church, traditionally dating back to the 6th century. Gerald of Wales recorded that the clas church held a handbell, which had supposedly belonged to St David, held magical powers and was known as a 'bangu'. The present church stands in a circular churchyard in the centre of the village. Cadw dates it to the 14th century. In 1891 restoration was undertaken by Ewan Christian.

The church remains an active parish church in the Diocese of Swansea and Brecon and regular services are held.

== Architecture and description ==
The church is built to a cruciform plan, with a nave, chancel, transepts and a central tower. The building materials are local sandstones with a shale tile roof. The exterior, and part of the interior, have been whitewashed. Robert Scourfield and Richard Haslam, in their Powys volume in the Buildings of Wales series, describe it as "architecturally, a finer and larger church than its neighbours". (Note: By "its neighbours", Scourfield and Haslam are referencing St Mary's Church, Gladestry and St Michael's Church, Michaelchurch-on-Arrow, both of which lie further to the east, close to the border with England.) The churchyard is roughly circular, supporting the interpretation of its origins as a clas settlement. St David's is as a Grade I listed building.

== Sources ==
- Scourfield, Robert; Haslam, Richard (2013). Powys: Montgomeryshire, Radnorshire and Breconshire. The Buildings of Wales. New Haven, US and London: Yale University Press. ISBN 978-0-300-18508-9. OCLC 863678002.
