= St Bilo's Church, Llanfilo =

Church in Powys, Wales

Coordinates: 51.9907°N 3.2844°W

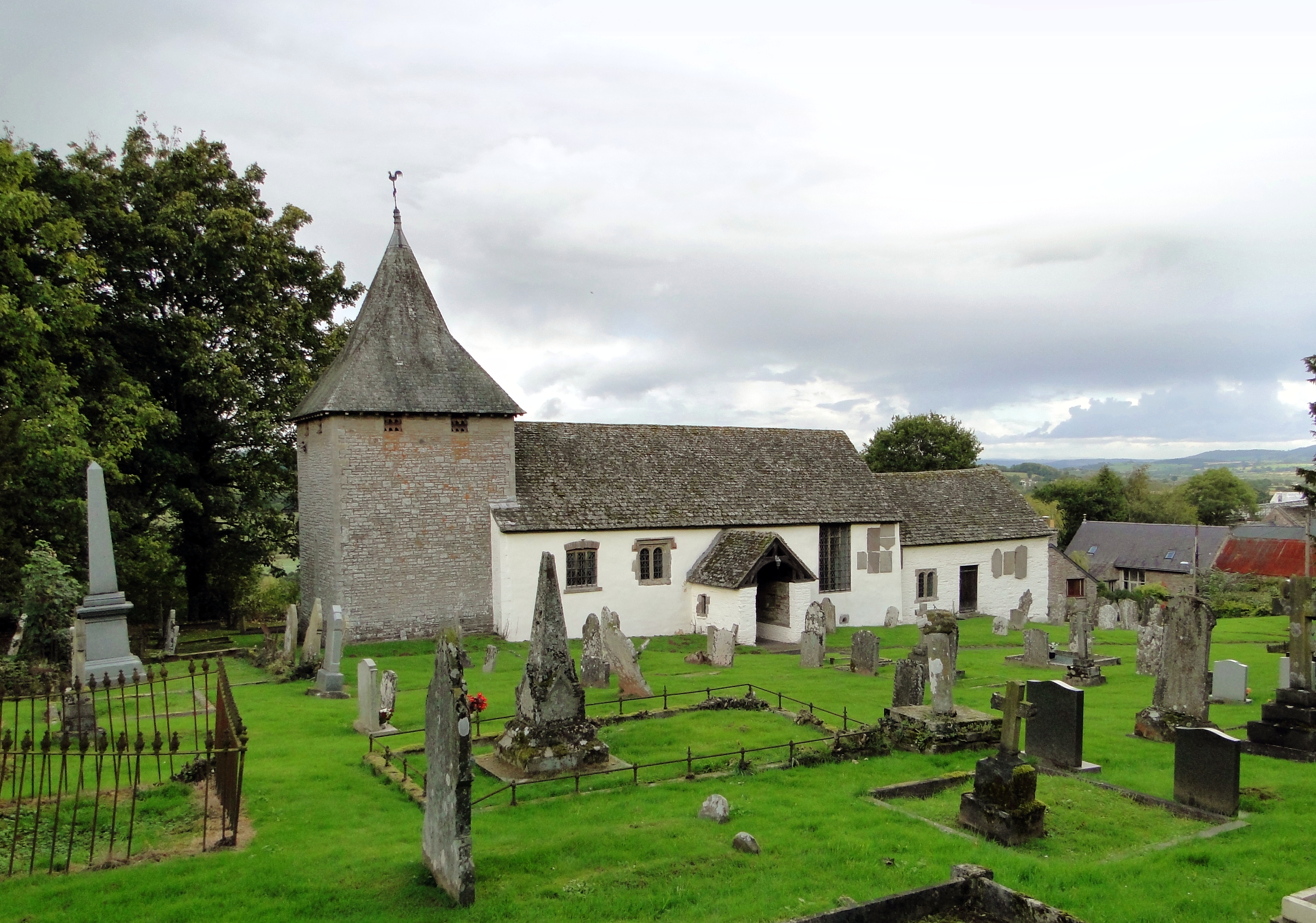

- Location in Powys
- OS grid reference: SO 118 332
- Location: Llanfilo, Felin-fach, Powys
- Country: Wales
- Denomination: Church in Wales

History
- Status: active
- Dedication: Saint Bilo

Architecture
- Architect: W. D. Caröe (restoration)
- Architectural type: Church
- Groundbreaking: 12th century

Administration
- Diocese: Swansea and Brecon
- Archdeaconry: Brecon
- Deanery: Greater Brecon
- Parish: Black Mountains Ministry Area

Listed Building – Grade I
- Official name: St Bilo's Church
- Designated: 17 January 1963
- Reference no.: 6742

Listed Building – Grade II
- Official name: Lychgate at the Church of St Bilo
- Designated: 17 January 1963
- Reference no.: 6743

Listed Building – Grade II
- Official name: Sundial in the churchyard of St Bilo
- Designated: 17 January 1963
- Reference no.: 6744

Listed Building – Grade II
- Official name: Old Rectory at Llanfilo
- Designated: 31 March 2005
- Reference no.: 84329

St Bilo's Church, is an active parish church in the village of Llanfilo, Felin-fach, Powys, Wales. The dedication is to Bilo, one of the 24 children of Brychan, a legendary 5th-century king of Brycheiniog. Dating from the 12th century, with later additions, the church was restored by W. D. Caröe in the early 20th century. St Bilo's is designated by Cadw as a Grade I listed building.

== History ==
The present Church of St Bilo dates from the 12-15th centuries. The Church in Wales Historic Record for the building notes the tradition that the building is of Norman origin. Cadw suggests that two small lintels may be of this date, or earlier. The Clwyd-Powys Archaeological Trust survey undertaken in 1996 did not find built evidence for such an early date. The tower was completely rebuilt in 1882. (Note: Scourfield and Haslam consider the tower's supporting arch, "the only jarring Victorian note" in the building's interior.) It was sensitively restored in the early 20th century by W. D. Caröe. A further renovation by the Caröe architectural practice took place in took place in 1992.

The church remains an active parish church in the Diocese of Swansea and Brecon and occasional services are held.

== Architecture and description ==
St Bilo's has been described as "rivalling Patrishow and Llanelieu in its beauty, peace and holiness". It consists of a nave, chancel, West tower, and South porch. The church holds a notable 16th-century rood screen and loft, and the Royal Commission on the Ancient and Historical Monuments of Wales records the "splendid ribbed barrel roof". Robert Scourfield and Richard Haslam, in their Powys volume in the Buildings of Wales series, note the substantial collection of wall-mounted 18th century memorial stones.

St Bilo's is as a Grade I listed building. Its lychgate, one of the oldest in Wales and dating from around 1700, a sundial in the churchyard and the former rectory, are all listed at Grade II.

== Sources ==
- Scourfield, Robert; Haslam, Richard (2013). Powys: Montgomeryshire, Radnorshire and Breconshire. The Buildings of Wales. New Haven, US and London: Yale University Press. ISBN 978-0-300-18508-9. OCLC 863678002.
