= Baynham Hall =

Manor house in Gladestry, Powys, Wales

Coordinates: 52.1542°N 3.1227°W

Baynham Hall is a Grade II* listed 17th -century manor house located in Michaelchurch-On-Arrow, Gladestry, Powys, Wales.

Originally built circa 1700, the stone house was added to an earlier wing of the previous property and developments. Of William and Mary-aged proportions across five bays, it has a tall hipped roof, pediment gable containing a Venetian window, and tall chimney stacks. Internally the house contains a period staircase with contemporary turned balustrades. Adjacent to the main house is an L-shaped 18th-century corn barn with byres.

In 1830, Hugh Lloyd, originally of Llanddewi Ystradenny, Radnorshire, purchased Baynham Hall from William Trumper.

It was Grade II* listed on the 21 September 1962, and forms part of the Cadw registry of ancient Welsh buildings.
