= St Mary Magdalene's Church, Bleddfa =

Church in Powys, Wales

Coordinates: 52.3078°N 3.1652°W

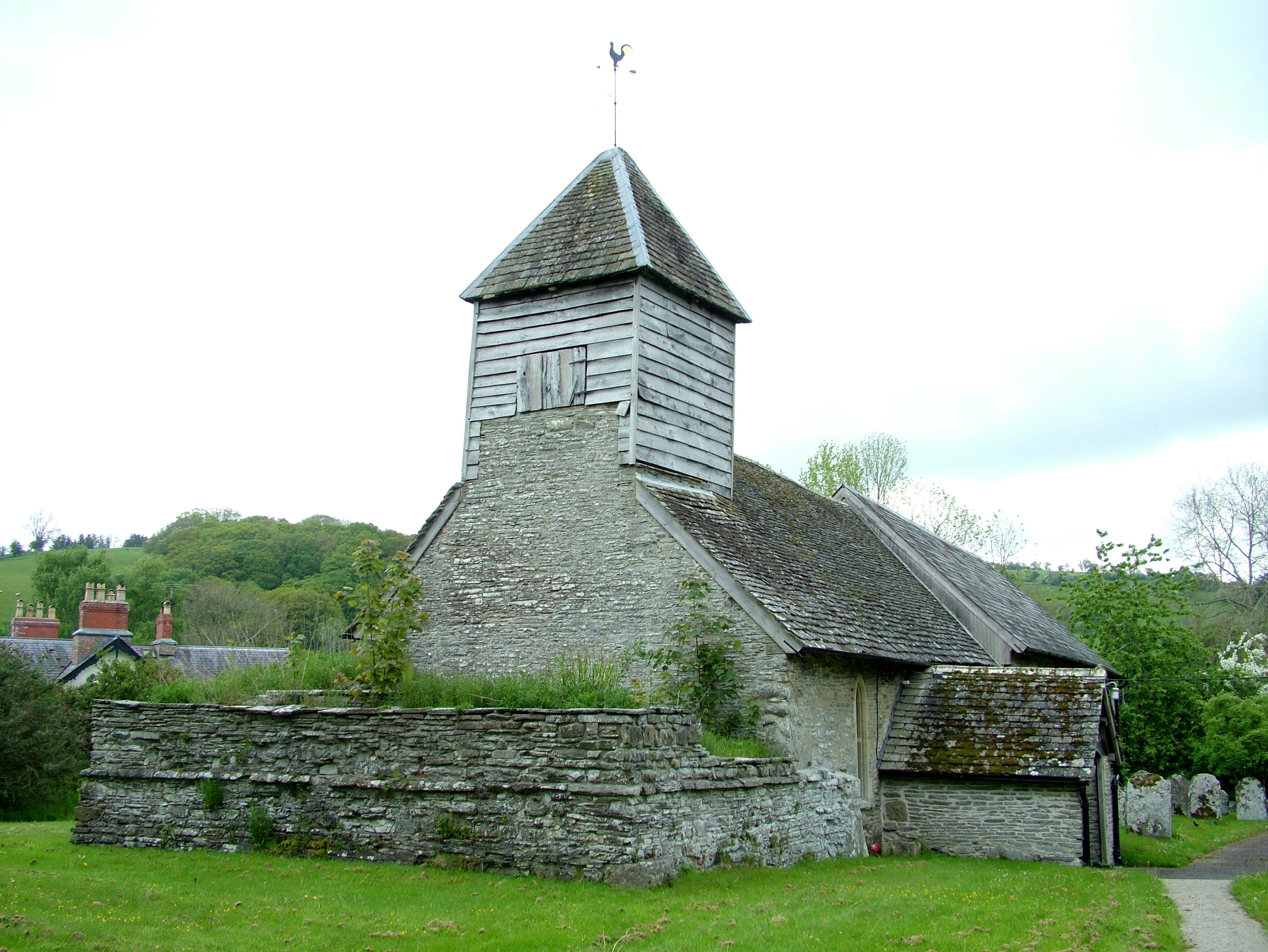

- Location in Powys
- OS grid reference: SO 206 683
- Location: Bleddfa, Powys
- Country: Wales
- Denomination: Church in Wales

History
- Status: active
- Dedication: Saint Mary Magdalene

Architecture
- Heritage designation: Grade I
- Designated: 24 October 1951
- Architectural type: Church
- Groundbreaking: 13th century

Administration
- Diocese: Swansea and Brecon
- Archdeaconry: Brecon
- Deanery: Greater Brecon
- Parish: East Radnor Ministry Area

St Mary Magdalene's Church is an active parish church in the village of Bleddfa, Powys, Wales. Tradition asserts that a clas church was founded on the site by St Brendan the Navigator in the 6th century but there is neither documentary or built evidence to support the claim. The present church dates from the 13th century. The bellcote was built in 1711 and the church restored in the early 20th century and again in the 1970s. St Mary Magdalene's is designated by Cadw as a Grade I listed building.

== History ==
The Church of St Mary Magdalene stands in a large churchyard in the centre of the village of Bleddfa, to the south-west of Knighton. A strong local tradition asserts that a clas church was founded on the site by St Brendan the Navigator in the 6th century, but there is neither documentary or built evidence to support the claim. Cadw dates the present church to the early 13th century. Masonry foundations exist to show that the church once had a tower, by tradition this was destroyed by Owain Glyndŵr in his rebellion in 1402. The present bellcote dates from 1711. Restoration was undertaken in 1907 and further renovations were undertaken internally and externally in the mid-20th century, with further internal modifications in 2008.

The church remains an active parish church in the Diocese of Swansea and Brecon and occasional services are held. (Note: Scourfield and Haslam suggest that the church closed in 1973 and passed into the care of the Bleddfa Trust in 1977. The Bleddfa Community website suggests it remains an active place of worship and the Church in Wales records the church as active.)

== Architecture and description ==
St Mary's consists of a nave, chancel, the ruins of a western tower, south porch and a bellcote. The Clwyd-Powys Archaeological Trust survey undertaken in 1995 notes that the building materials are sandstone and shale. Robert Scourfield and Richard Haslam, in their Powys volume in the Buildings of Wales series, describe the interior as "luminous", which they attribute to the mid-century renovations of George Pace who removed the pews and many of the internal fittings.

St Mary Magdalene's is as a Grade I listed building. The former vicarage is listed at Grade II.

== Gallery ==
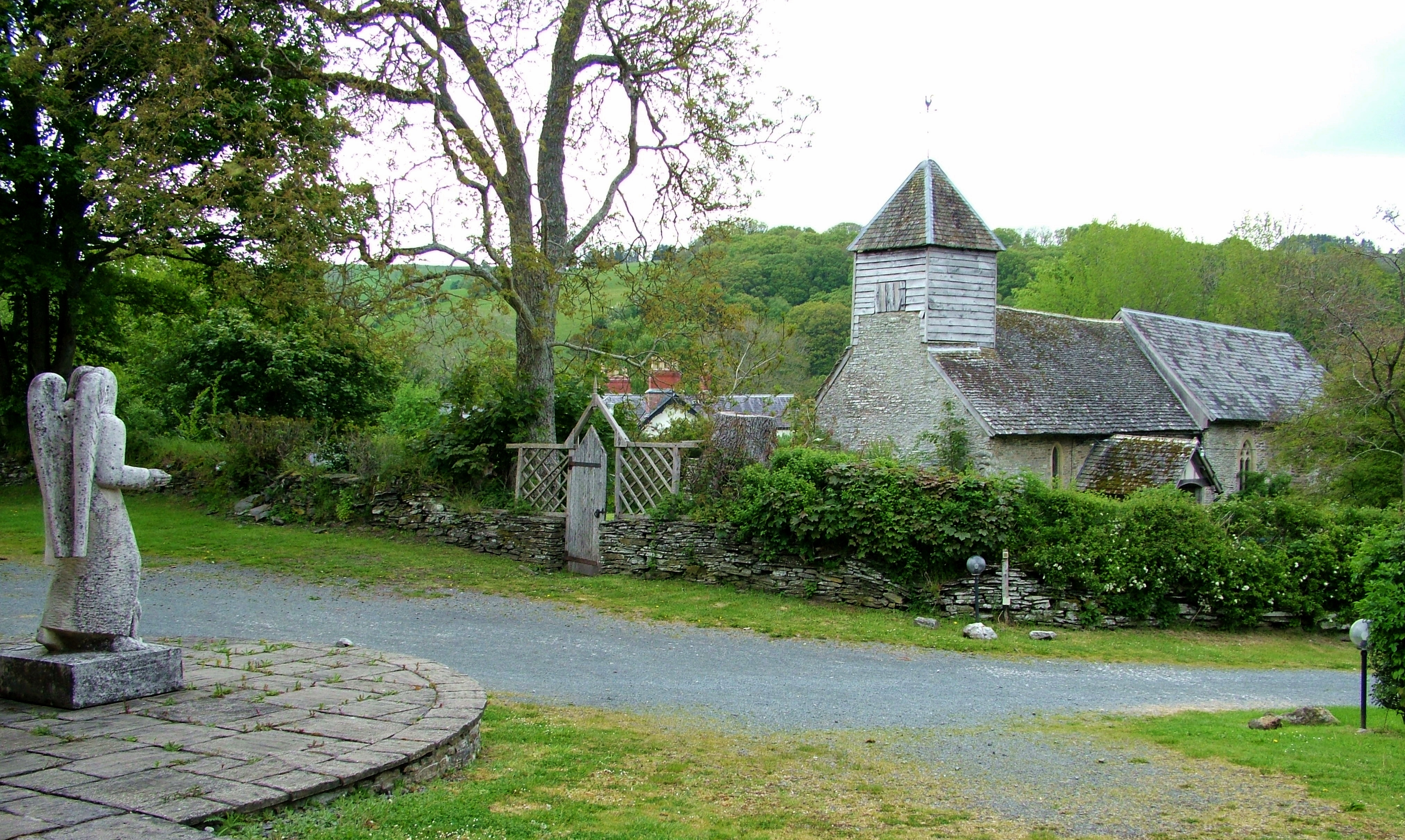
Church in its setting

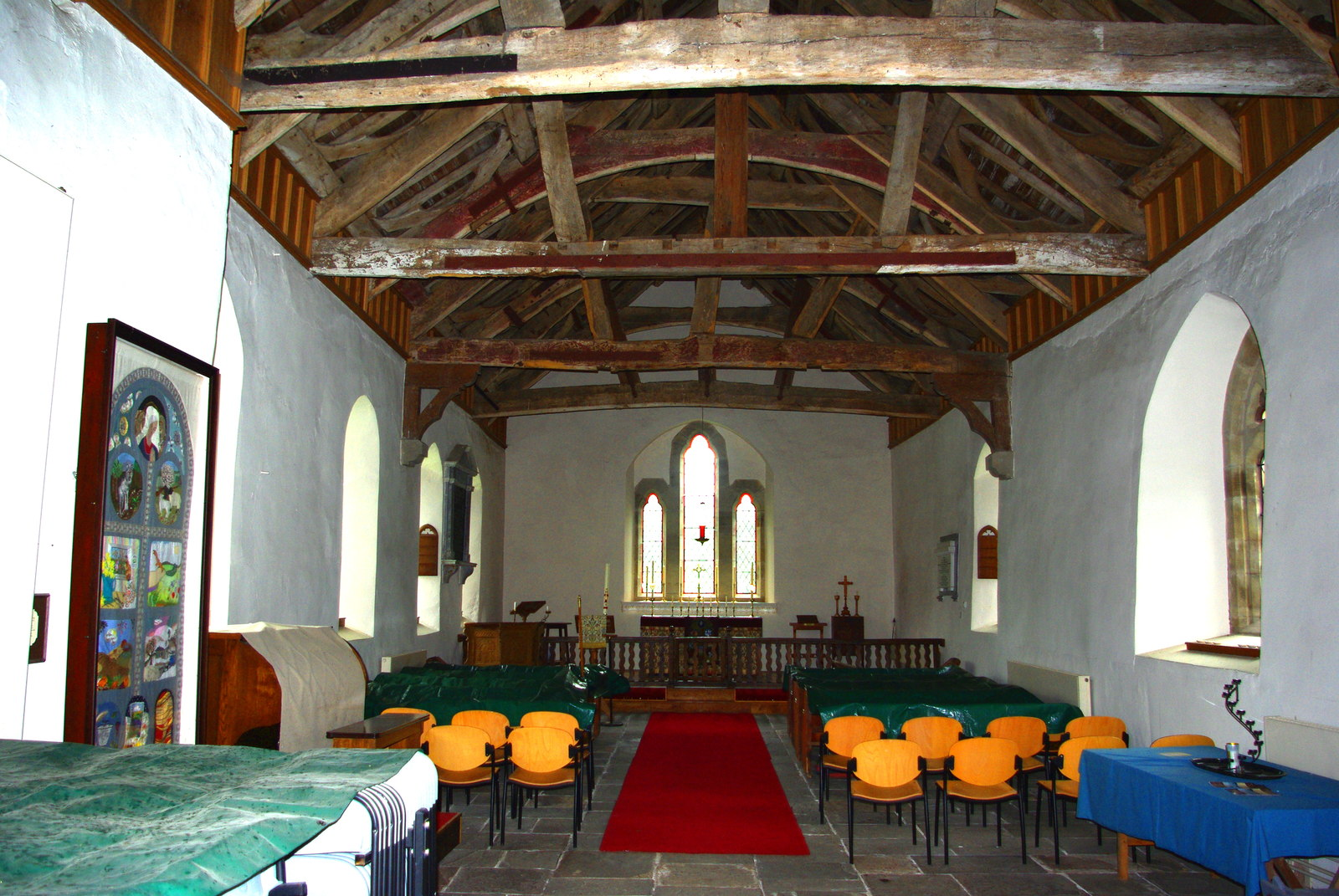
Interior

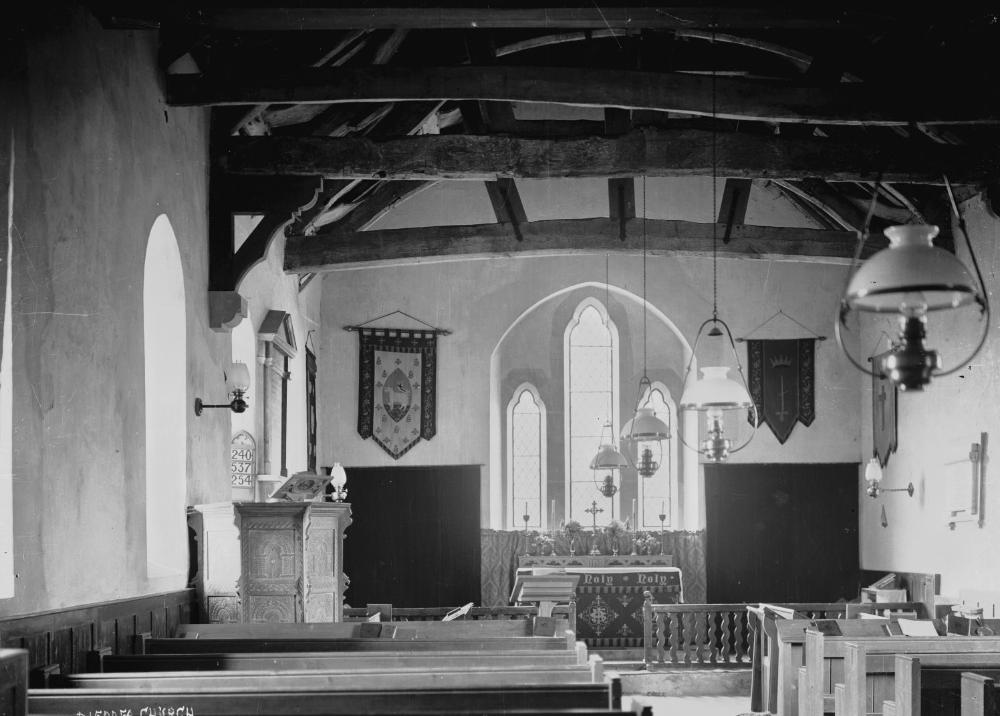
Church interior prior to the restoration by George Pace

== Sources ==
- Scourfield, Robert; Haslam, Richard (2013). Powys: Montgomeryshire, Radnorshire and Breconshire. The Buildings of Wales. New Haven, US and London: Yale University Press. ISBN 978-0-300-18508-9. OCLC 863678002.
