= Llandyfaelog Tre'r-graig =

Hamlet in Powys, Wales

Coordinates: 51.961°N 3.273°W

Llandyfaelog Tre'r-graig (also spelled Llandefaelog-tre'r-graig) is a hamlet in Powys, Wales. It is in the Felin-fach community and historically in Brecknockshire. There are several forms of the name, including Llandefaelog Tre'r Graig, with Tre'r-graig added to distinguish between it from Llandyfaelog, Carmarthenshire, and nearby Llandyfaelog Fach. The hamlet is 33.4 miles (53.8 km) from Cardiff,

The village is named after St Tyfaelog.

The village is located 5 miles (8.0 km) east of Brecon, on the slopes of the hills between the Brecon Beacons to the west and the Black Mountain to the east. It lies on the rural road between Talgarth to the north and Llanfihangel Talyllyn to the south. Other nearby villages include Loughstone. It is about 2 miles (3.2 km) northeast of Trefeca, associated with the community of the evangelist of the 18th century Howel Harris.
