= Willow Globe Theatre =

Coordinates: 52.257°N 3.486°W

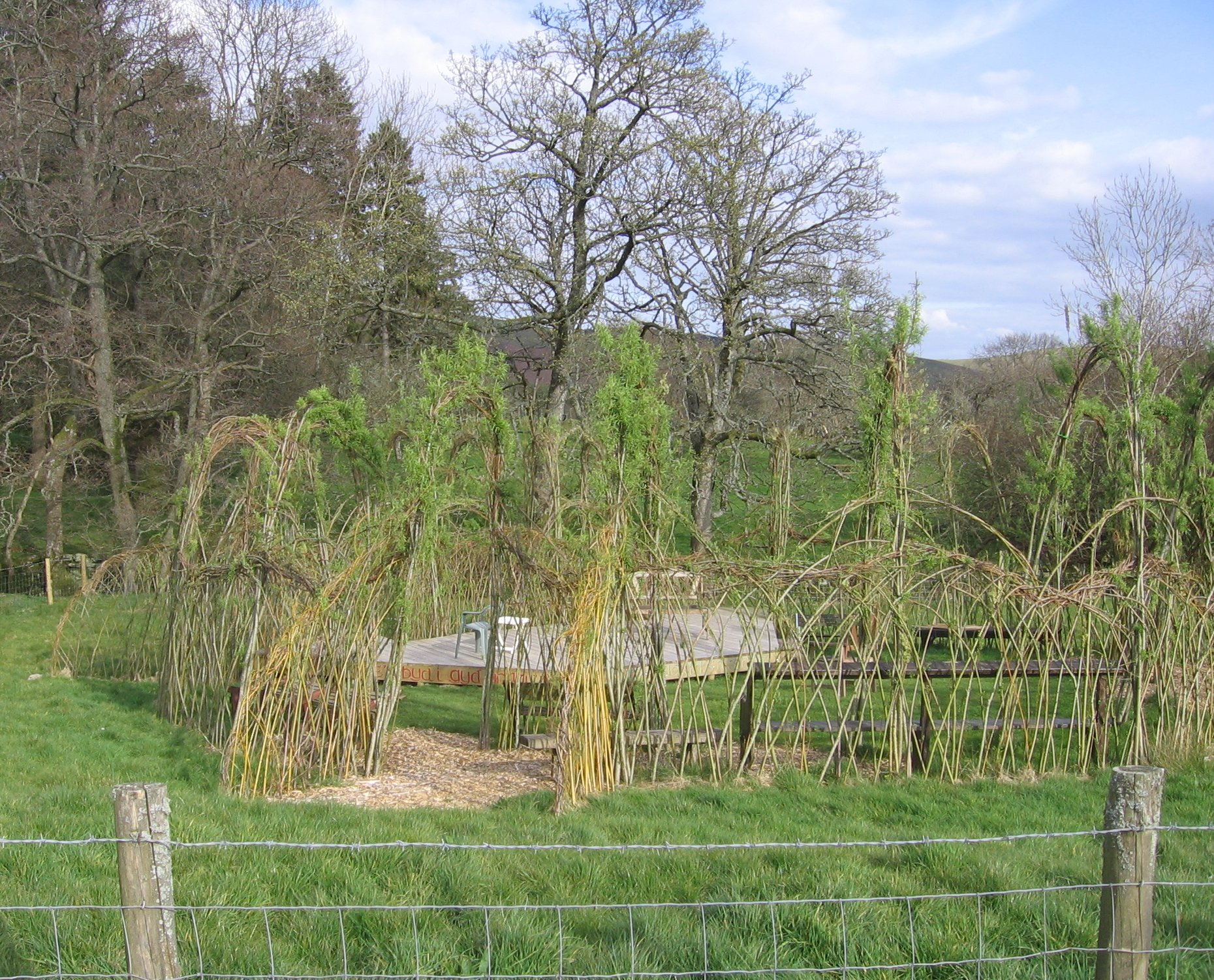
The Willow Globe Theatre

The Willow Globe Theatre (Welsh: Glôb Byw, formerly known as the Living Willow Theatre) is an open air community theatre in Powys, Wales.

It is a scaled-down version of the Globe Theatre in London, about a third of its size in diameter and similar to the Open Air Theatre, Regent's Park in London. The theatre is formed from living willow trees that have been woven together from a design by Dr Rebecca Heaton. It seats an audience of around 110 people. The theatre was formally opened on 22 April 2006.

The Willow Globe is part of the charity Shakespeare Link and has a resident company, the Willow Globe Company. Plays by William Shakespeare are performed among others. The theatre also hosts workshops and festivals. It is run by the actors Phil Bowen and Susanna Best.

== Location ==
The theatre is located at Penlanole, Nantmel, across the River Wye from the village of Llanwrthwl, between Llandrindod Wells and Rhayader, close to the hamlet of Nant Glas off the A470 main road.
