= Nant Glas =

Village in Powys, Wales

Coordinates: 52.275°N 03.472°W

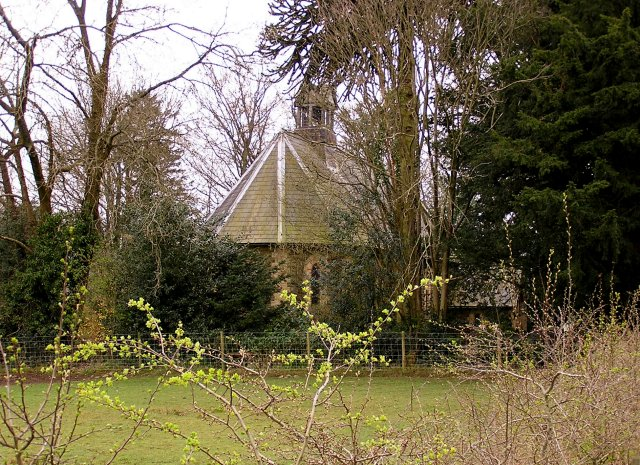
The chapel in Nant Glas

Nant Glas (or Nant-glas) is a village in the Elan Valley near Rhayader and Llandrindod Wells in Powys, Wales. It is on a side road between the A44 to the northeast and the A470 to the southwest. There is a small chapel at the southern end of the village.

The Willow Globe Theatre is close to the village, to the south just off the A470.

== Gallery ==
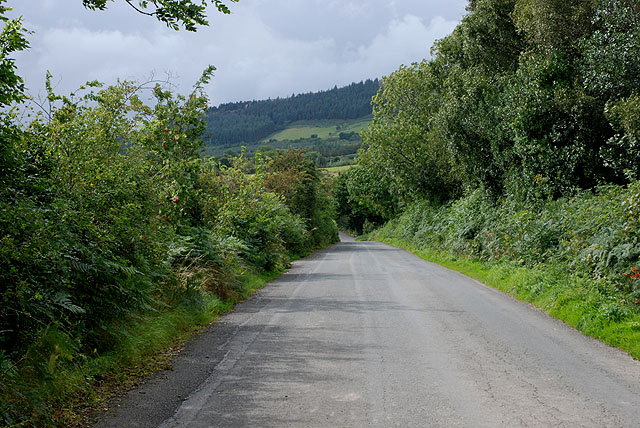
Road to Nant Glas

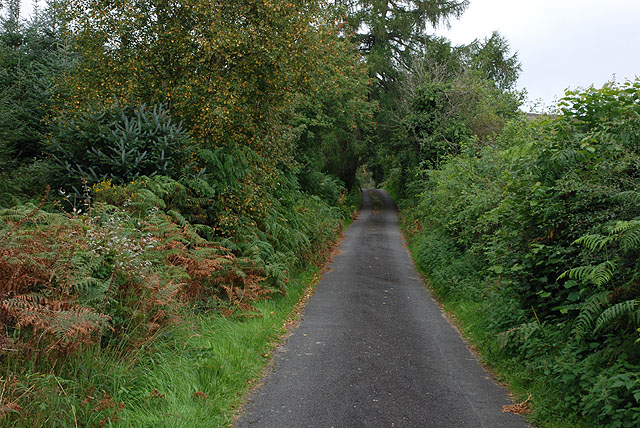
Lane heading north from Nant Glas

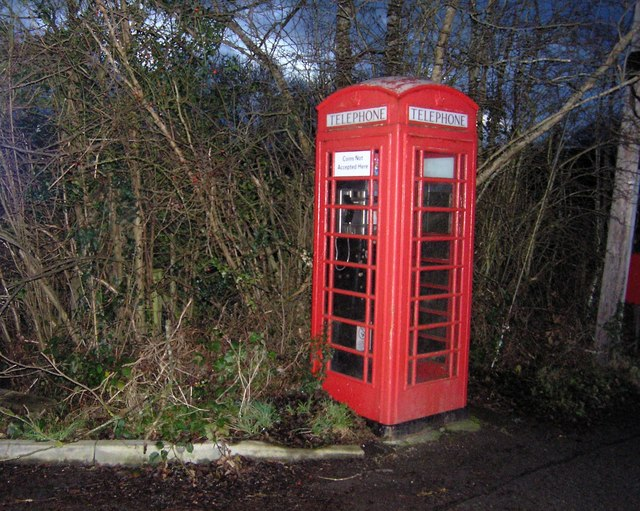
Traditional red telephone box at Nant Glas
