= St Cewydd's Church, Disserth =

Church in Powys, Wales

Coordinates: 52.2151°N 3.4142°W

St Cewydd's, Disserth
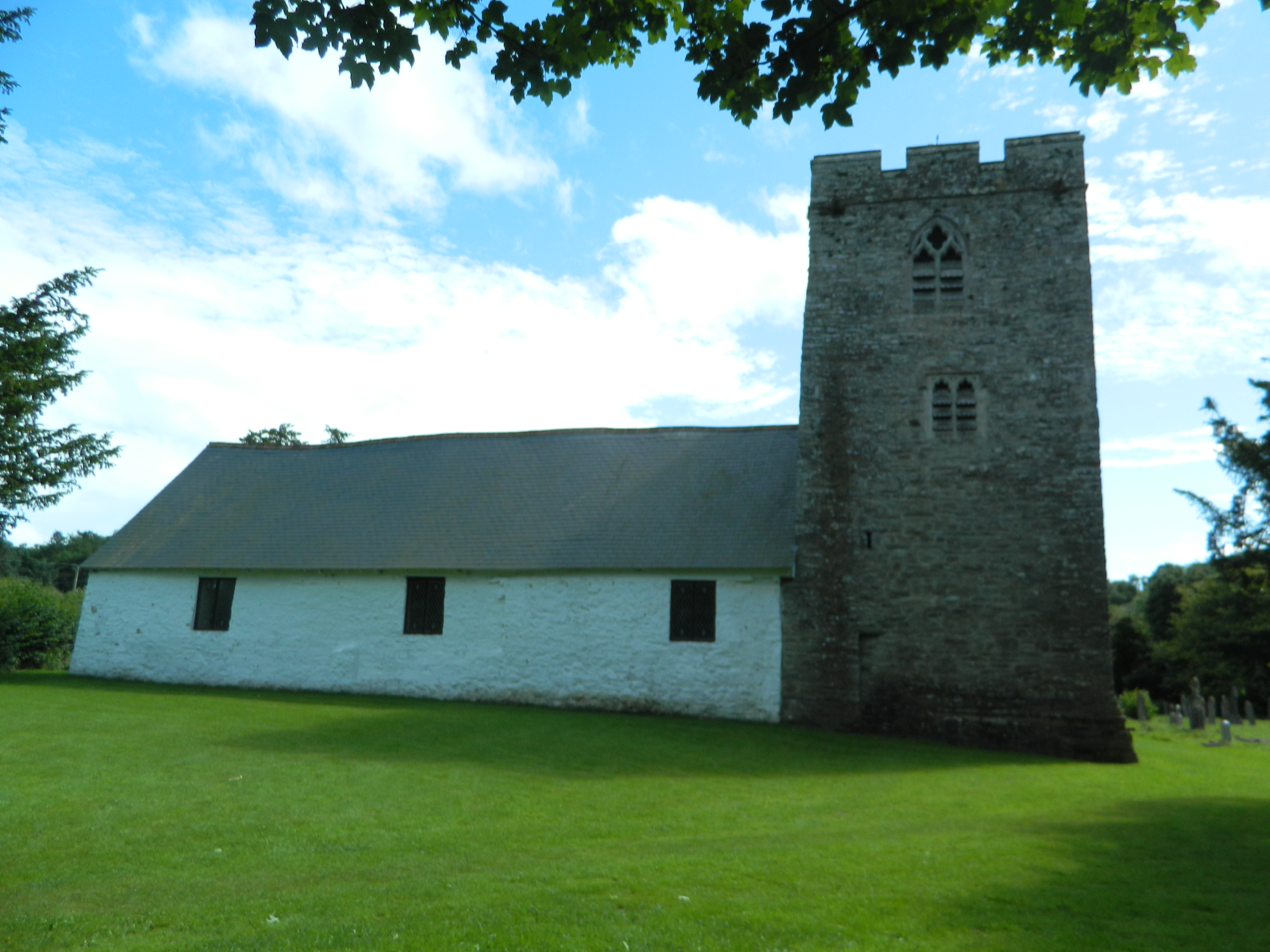

- Location in Powys
- OS grid reference: SO 034 583
- Location: Disserth and Trecoed, Powys
- Country: Wales
- Denomination: Church in Wales

History
- Status: active
- Dedication: Saint Cewydd

Architecture
- Heritage designation: Grade I
- Designated: 31 May 1962
- Architectural type: Church
- Groundbreaking: 14th century

Administration
- Diocese: Swansea and Brecon
- Archdeaconry: Brecon
- Deanery: Radnor and Builth
- Parish: West Radnor Ministry Area

St Cewydd's Church is an active parish church in the village of Disserth, Powys, Wales. The dispersed village of Disserth lies south of Llandrindod Wells and north of Builth Wells. The church stands in an isolated position on a bank of the River Ithon. Unrestored in the Victorian era, the church has an unusually complete 18th century interior. Medieval in origin, St Cewydd's is designated by Cadw as a Grade I listed building.

== History ==
The Church of St Cewydd stands in a walled churchyard in the centre of the village of Disserth. The village is dispersed and lies around 4 km south-west of Llandrindod Wells. The church is certainly medieval in date, with Cadw suggesting that the porch is the earliest extant feature. There is uncertainty as to the date of the tower. Cadw records it as "probably 18th century", while noting that earlier dates have been suggested. Robert Scourfield and Richard Haslam, in their Powys volume in the Buildings of Wales series, conclude, "the tower must be 14th century", and other sources follow this.

The church escaped the attention of "improvers" in the Victorian era and retains an interior almost entirely of the 17th and 18th centuries.

The church remains an active parish church in the Diocese of Swansea and Brecon and occasional services are held.

== Architecture and description ==
St Cewydd's consists of a combined nave and chancel, a western tower and a south porch. The building material is mainly local rubble, whitewashed externally and internally. The tower is three-storeyed, with a 19th-century battlement. The roofs are 15th century with scissor trusses. The Clwyd-Powys Archaeological Trust (CPAT) survey undertaken in 1996 notes that a false ceiling was inserted in 1839 and removed in the early 20th century. The interior contains an exceptionally rare, and almost complete set of 17th and 18th century fittings and furnishings, including a three-decker pulpit, box pews and communion rails. Many of the box pews still carry the nameplates of the parishioners who paid for and used them. (Note: Among the nameplates is that of the inventor James Watt who retired to Radnorshire in 1805.) The Royal Commission on the Ancient and Historical Monuments of Wales notes the discovery of a series of, much faded, wall paintings during a limited internal restoration undertaken in the 1950s. They include the coat of arms of Queen Anne (1665–1714).

St Cewydd's is as a Grade I listed building. Its Cadw listing record emphasises the building's "exceptional architectural interest as a parish church retaining very rare pre-19th character, including a complete 17th and 18th century interior plan and detail."

== Gallery ==
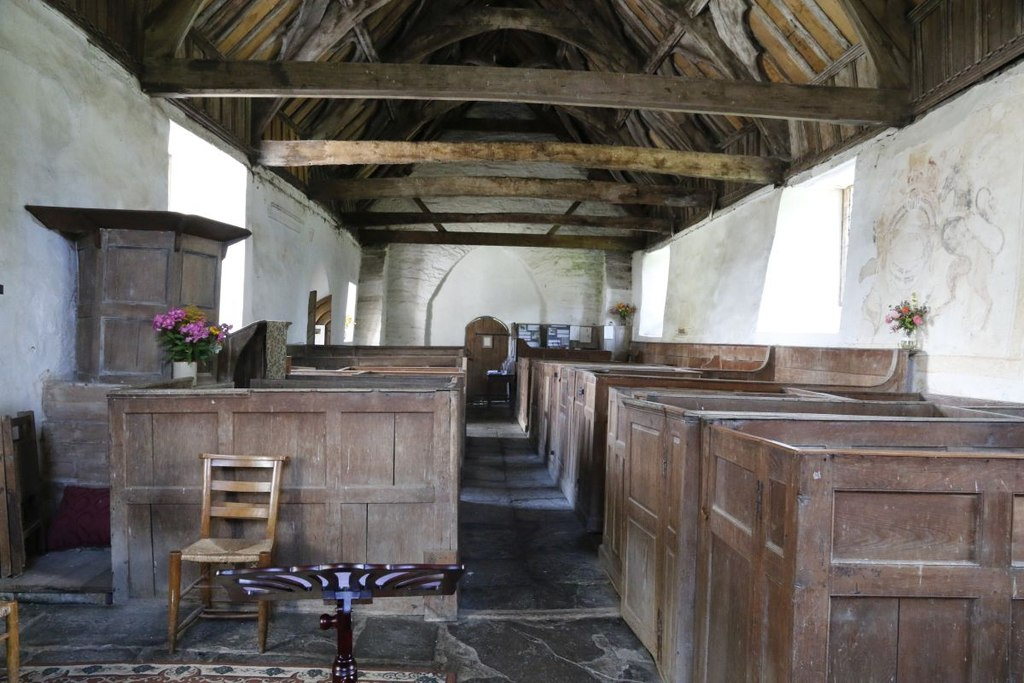
The nave

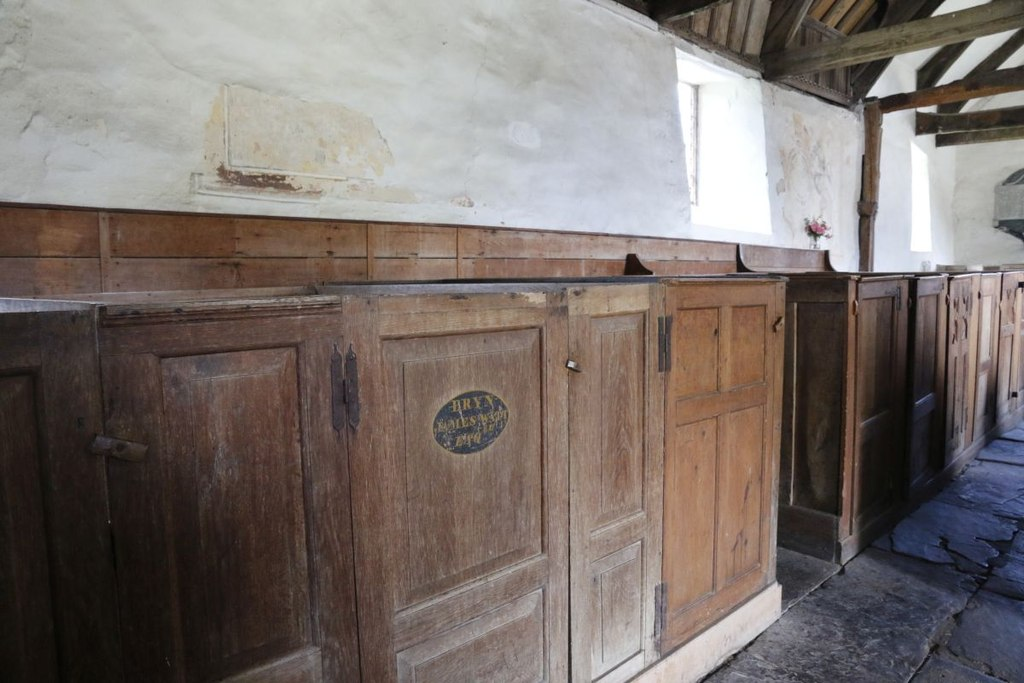
Box pews

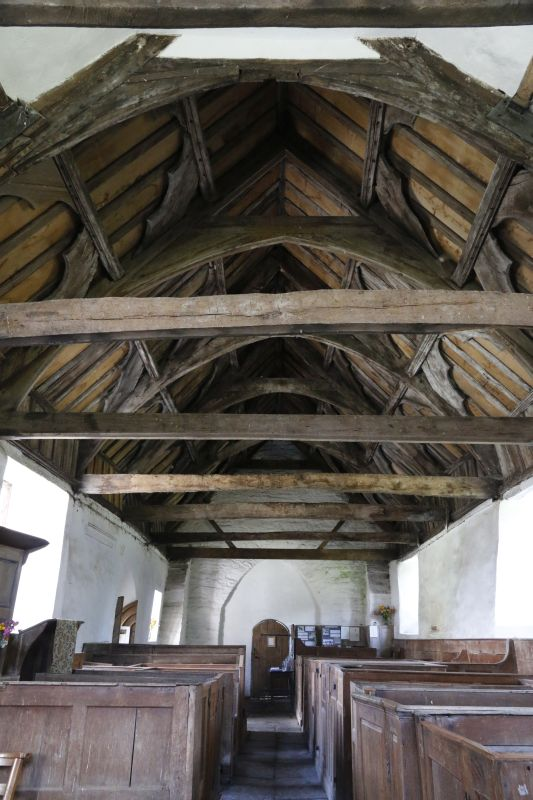
The roof

== Sources ==
- Scourfield, Robert; Haslam, Richard (2013). Powys: Montgomeryshire, Radnorshire and Breconshire. The Buildings of Wales. New Haven, US and London: Yale University Press. ISBN 978-0-300-18508-9. OCLC 863678002.
