= Tyfaelog =

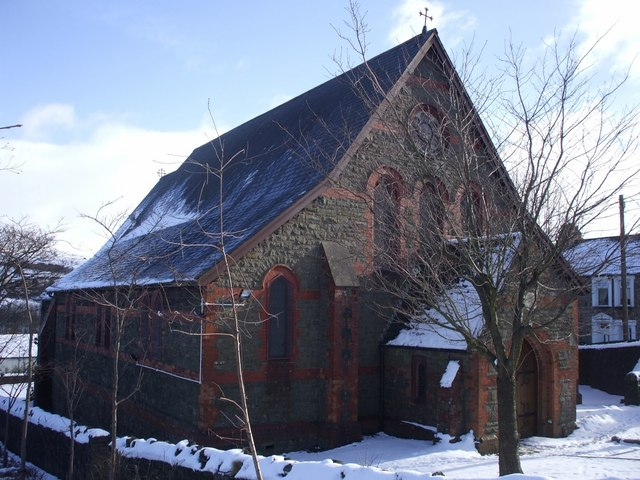
St Tyfaelog's Church, Pontlottyn

Tyfaelog was a 6th-century saint of Wales. The saint is connected to a small area near Brecon south Powys where there are two churches: Llandyfaelog Tre'r-graig and Llandyfaelog Fach.

There is also a church in Llandyfaelog, between Kidwelly and Carmarthen (Carmarthenshire).Tyfaelog is recorded as being the son of Gildas.

A feast day is celebrated in his honour on 1 March at Llandyfaelog Tre'r-graig and on 26 February at Llandyfaelog, Ystrad Tywi.
