= St Matthew's Church, Llandefalle =

Church in Powys, Wales

Coordinates: 52.0114°N 3.3017°W

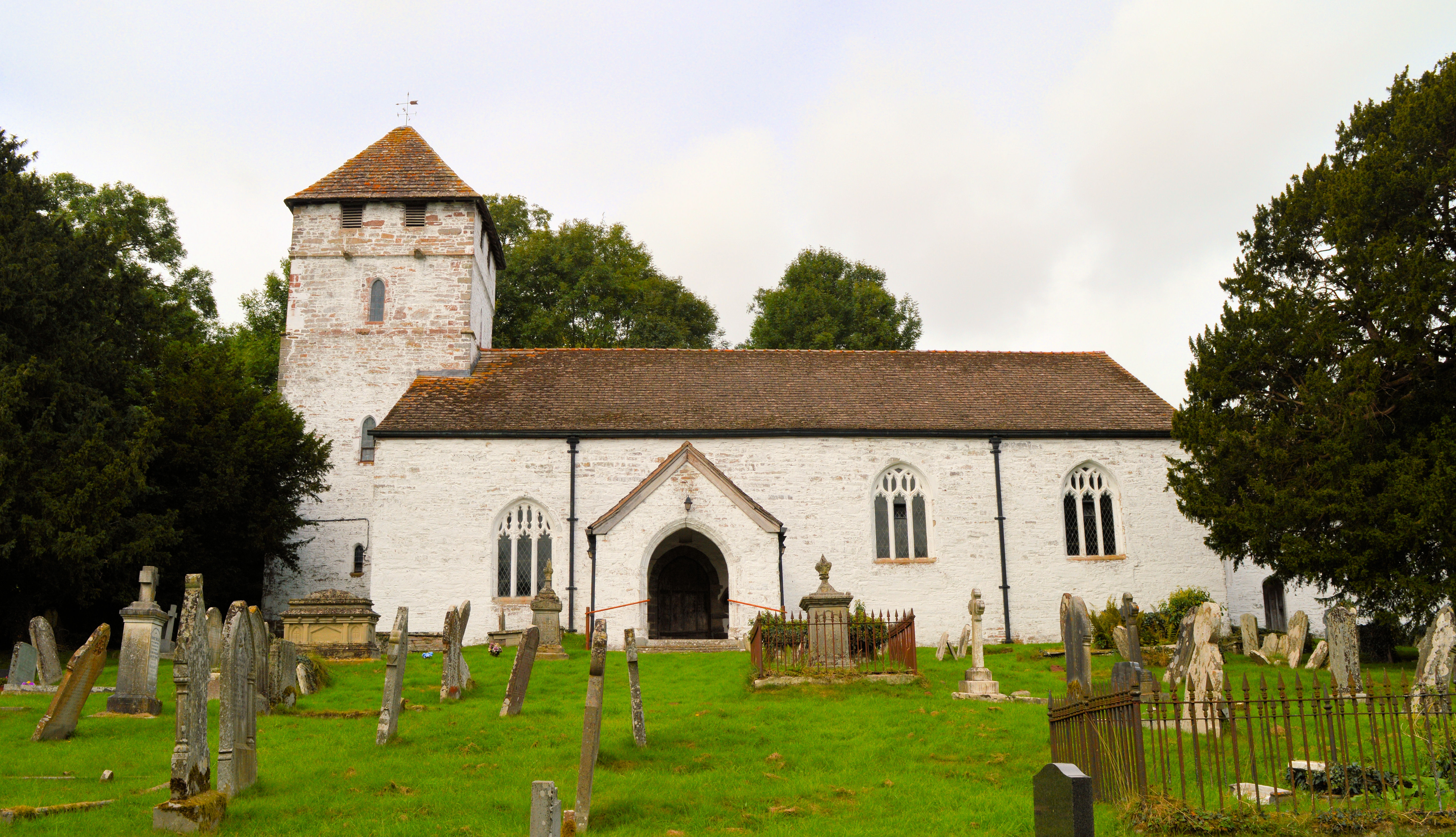

- Location in Powys
- OS grid reference: SO 107 355
- Location: Llandefalle, Felin-fach, Powys
- Country: Wales
- Denomination: Church in Wales

History
- Status: active
- Dedication: Saint Matthew

Architecture
- Heritage designation: Grade I
- Designated: 17 January 1963
- Architect: W. D. Caröe (attributed restoration)
- Architectural type: Church
- Groundbreaking: 15th century

Administration
- Diocese: Swansea and Brecon
- Archdeaconry: Brecon
- Deanery: Greater Brecon
- Parish: Black Mountains Ministry Area

St Matthew's Church, is an active parish church in the village of Llandefalle, Felin-fach, Powys, Wales. Dating from the 15th century, the church was restored, probably by W. D. Caröe, in the early 20th century. St Matthew's is designated by Cadw as a Grade I listed building.

== History ==
The earliest dedication of a church on the site, some 5km to the north of Brecon, was to St Maelog and there is some remaining evidence of 13th century construction. The present church is mainly of the 15th century. The church escaped the heavy restorations generally undertaken in the Victorian era, when the western end of the church was partitioned off and served as the village school. It was sensitively restored in the early 20th century, probably by W. D. Caröe. (Note: Cadw's listing record states the 20th century restoration was "probably" by W. D. Caröe. Scourfield and Haslam attribute the 1905 restoration to E. V. Collier. The Church in Wales Historic Record mentions internal fittings "in style of W. D. Caroe".) A further renovation took place in 1959.

The church remains an active parish church in the Diocese of Swansea and Brecon and occasional services are held.

== Architecture and description ==
St Matthew's is unusually large for its remote, rural setting and for the small community it serves. Robert Scourfield and Richard Haslam, in their Powys volume in the Buildings of Wales series, note its "lovely, secluded location". The church consists of a nave, chancel, aisles and a western tower.

St Matthew's is as a Grade I listed building. Its lychgate, and the former rectory are listed at Grade II.

== Sources ==
- Scourfield, Robert; Haslam, Richard (2013). Powys: Montgomeryshire, Radnorshire and Breconshire. The Buildings of Wales. New Haven, US and London: Yale University Press. ISBN 978-0-300-18508-9. OCLC 863678002.
