= St David's Church, Llanddew =

Church in Powys, Wales

Coordinates: 51.9671°N 3.3772°W

- Holy Trinity or the Church of St David
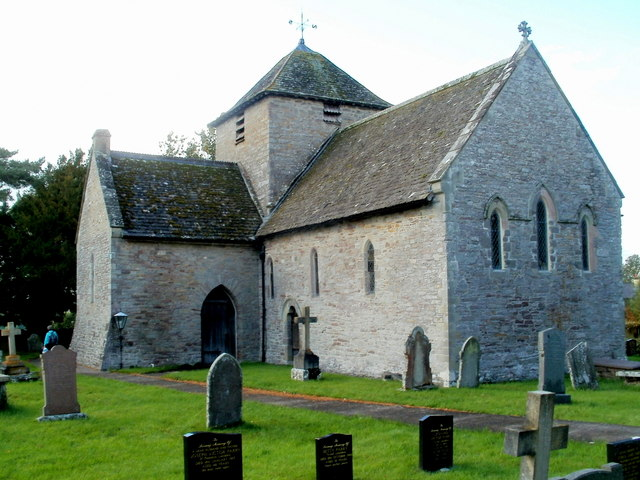

- Location in Powys
- OS grid reference: SO 054 307
- Location: Llanddew, Powys
- Country: Wales
- Denomination: Church in Wales

History
- Status: active
- Dedication: Saint David

Architecture
- Heritage designation: Grade I
- Designated: 17 January 1963
- Architect: Ewan Christian (restoration)
- Architectural type: Church
- Groundbreaking: 13th century

Administration
- Diocese: Swansea and Brecon
- Archdeaconry: Brecon
- Deanery: Greater Brecon
- Parish: Brecon and Epynt Ministry Area

St David's Church is an active parish church in the village of Llanddew, Powys, Wales. It stands next to the castle, some 2km to the north-east of Brecon. It is traditionally associated with Gerald of Wales, who served as Archdeacon of Brecon and lived in the castle in the late 12th century. Ruined by the mid-19th century, the church was restored by Ewan Christian. St David's is designated by Cadw as a Grade I listed building.

== History ==
It is probable that the earliest structure on the site was a clas church, traditionally dating back to the 6th century. The present church stands adjacent to the castle, in the centre of the village of Llanddew, some 2km north-east of Brecon. Cadw dates it to the 13th century. In the Middle Ages the castle was the residence of the Archdeacon of Brecon, a post held in the late 1100s by Gerald of Wales who is traditionally associated with the church. (Note: Gerald entertained Baldwin of Forde, the Archbishop of Canterbury, at the castle, during Forde's recruitment campaign in Wales for the Third Crusade. Gerald's tour with Baldwin led to his writing Itinerarium Cambriae (1191) and then the Descriptio Cambriae (1194).) The church tower was rebuilt in 1629 and further renovation took place in the 18th century. By the mid-19th century the building was in ruins, and restoration was undertaken by Ewan Christian, in two phases between 1883-1884 and in 1900. A further renovation took place in 1960.

The church remains an active parish church in the Diocese of Swansea and Brecon and regular services are held.

== Architecture and description ==
The church is built to a cruciform plan, with a nave, chancel, transepts and a central tower. The south porch dates from the Ewan Christian reconstruction. Robert Scourfield and Richard Haslam, in their Powys volume in the Buildings of Wales series, describe it as "superficially, a convincingly 12th to 13th century church" before giving details of the multiple restorations. The building materials are local sandstones with a shale tile roof. The churchyard is roughly circular, supporting the interpretation of its origins as a clas settlement.

St David's is a Grade I listed building. Its lychgate is listed at Grade II.

== Sources ==
- Scourfield, Robert; Haslam, Richard (2013). Powys: Montgomeryshire, Radnorshire and Breconshire. The Buildings of Wales. New Haven, US and London: Yale University Press. ISBN 978-0-300-18508-9. OCLC 863678002.
