= Disserth and Trecoed =

Coordinates: 52.215°N 3.414°W

- Community
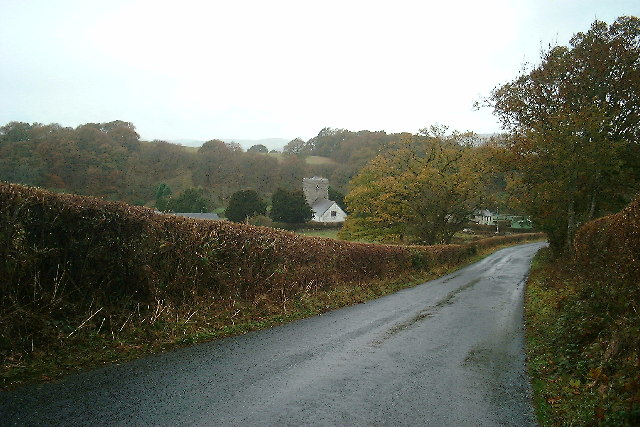
- St Cedwydd's, in the Ithon valley
- Principal area: Powys
- Country: Wales
- Sovereign state: United Kingdom
- Police: Dyfed-Powys
- Fire: Mid and West Wales
- Ambulance: Welsh
- List of places UK Wales Powys Map of the community

Disserth and Trecoed (Welsh: Diserth a Threcoed) is a community in central Powys, Wales (the historic county of Radnorshire). It has a population of 1,239 according to the 2011 UK census.

It is a rural area and includes the settlements of Howey and Crossway and the Caerwnon Park retirement park. It is located to the south of Llandrindod Wells and a few miles to the north of Builth Wells.

The dispersed village of Disserth has a Grade I listed church, St Cewydd's, which dates from the medieval period. It has an unrestored interior with box pews, dating from the 17th and 18th centuries.

== Governance ==
Disserth and Trecoed has a community council with seven elected community councillors.

The Disserth and Trecoed ward elected a county councillor to Powys County Council. Since 1995 it was represented by Labour, an independent, the Liberal Democrats and the Conservative Party. Boundary changes for the 2022 elections combined the community with Newbridge ward of Llanyre community, to form the Powys County Council ward of Disserth and Trecoed with Newbridge.
