= Partrishow =

Hamlet in Powys, Wales

Coordinates: 51°53′44″N 3°02′58″W

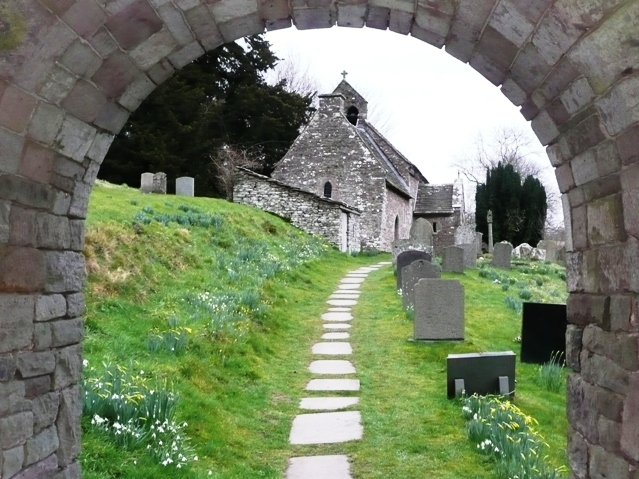
Partrishow Church

Partrishow, also known as Patricio, Patrishow, or by its Welsh names Merthyr Isw and Llanisw, is a small village and historic parish in the county of Powys (historically Brecknockshire), close to its border with Monmouthshire. It is in the valley of the Grwyne Fawr, in the Black Mountains of South Wales, within the Brecon Beacons National Park.

== Name ==
The earliest recorded form of the name, as found in the Book of Llandaf (c.1120s), is merthir issiu. This is the Welsh word merthyr ('burial site, shrine, church') and what is probably a personal name which in modern Welsh would be Isiw or Isw. Melville Richards gives Merthyr Isw as a modern form of the parish's name.

In 1555 the name appears as Llanysho. In this case, the element llan ('enclosure, church') has replaced merthyr, as has happened in a number of similar names. The name appears as Pertrissw in the list of parishes in National Library of Wales, Peniarth MS.147 (c.1566).

The modern English form is now Partrishow. In Welsh, the forms Llanisw and Merthyr Isw may be found.

== History and amenities ==
The village is noted for its outstanding grade I listed 11th-century Church of St Issui with an intricately carved 16th-century rood screen, mediaeval mural paintings, and one of the oldest fonts in Wales. The churchyard also contains a grade II* listed cross. The church was originally called Methur Issui ("Saint Issui the Martyr"), a corruption of Merthyr Ishaw or Ishow. It is now known as St Patrico. It avoided Victorian restoration, and its conservation was undertaken by W. D. Caröe in 1908–09, with further work on the churchyard in 1919.
