= Felin-fach =

Community in Powys, Wales

Coordinates: 51.99087°N 3.32534°W

- Community
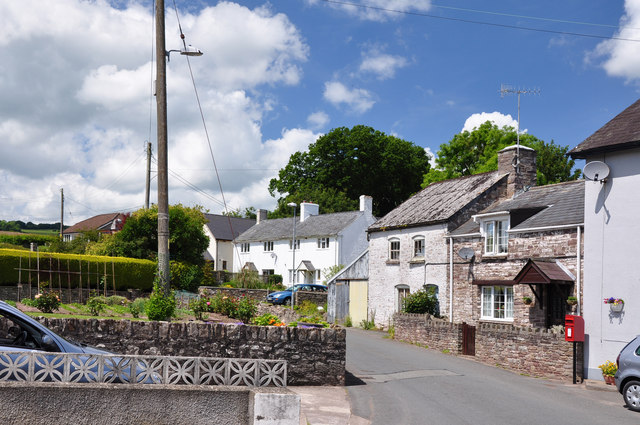
- Felin-fach
- Principal area: Powys
- Country: Wales
- Sovereign state: United Kingdom
- Police: Dyfed-Powys
- Fire: Mid and West Wales
- Ambulance: Welsh
- List of places UK Wales Powys Map of the community

Felin-fach (also spelled Felinfach) is a community in Powys, Wales, northwest of Brecon. The community had a population of 673 as of the 2011 UK Census. It includes the villages and hamlets Llandyfaelog Tre'r-graig, Llanfilo, Tredomen, Trefeitha, Pen-isa'r-waen and Talachddu.

St Bilo's Church, Llanfilo is dedicated to Saint Bilo and is a Grade I listed building, as is the Church of St Matthew at Llandefalle.
