= Llanyre =

Village in Wales

Llanyre: Welsh: Llanllŷr-yn-Rhos
- Location within Powys
- Population: 1,141 (2011)
- OS grid reference: SO045625
- Principal area: Powys
- Preserved county: Powys
- Country: Wales
- Sovereign state: United Kingdom
- Post town: Llandrindrod Wells
- Postcode district: LD1
- Dialling code: 01597
- Police: Dyfed-Powys
- Fire: Mid and West Wales
- Ambulance: Welsh
- UK Parliament: Brecon, Radnor and Cwm Tawe
- Senedd Cymru – Welsh Parliament: Brecon and Radnorshire
- List of places UK Wales Powys 52.252439°N 3.398423°W Community map: Map of the community

Llanyre (Welsh: Llanllŷr or Llanllŷr-yn-Rhos) is a village, community, and electoral ward in Radnorshire, Powys, Wales. The community had a population of 1,061 in 2001, increasing to 1,141 at the 2011 Census. It includes the village of Newbridge-on-Wye.

== Location ==
Llanyre is 2 km north-west of Llandrindod Wells, in the upper Wye Valley. The area is largely rural.

== Architecture ==
Housing in Llanyre comprises an eclectic mix of nineteenth century stone and brick housing, with newer, more modern housing schemes currently under development.

== Administration ==
Local administration is undertaken by the Llanyre Community Council, which is divided into two community wards: Newbridge with six members and Llanyre/Llanfihangel with five. (Newbridge is about 5 km SW of the village of Llanyre; thus the community is quite extensive.) The community was previously divided into three community wards, consisting of 12 elected members, as follows:

- Llanfihangel Helygen - 2 members, 44 electors.
- Llanyre Rural - 5 members, 400 electors.
- Llanyre Village - 5 members, 496 electors.

Meetings are held every third Tuesday in the month, excluding August.

Llanyre was a county electoral ward until 2022. The electorate of Llanyre ward was 940 in 2005. Following a boundary review, the Llanyre county ward was substantially added to, with three neighbouring communities (Abbey Cwmhir, Nantmel and St Harmon) being added, and it was renamed Llanyre and Nantmel as a consequence. Newbridge was combined with Disserth and Trecoed community to form the Disserth and Trecoed with Newbridge county ward. The changes were effective from the 2022 local elections.

== Church of St Llyr ==
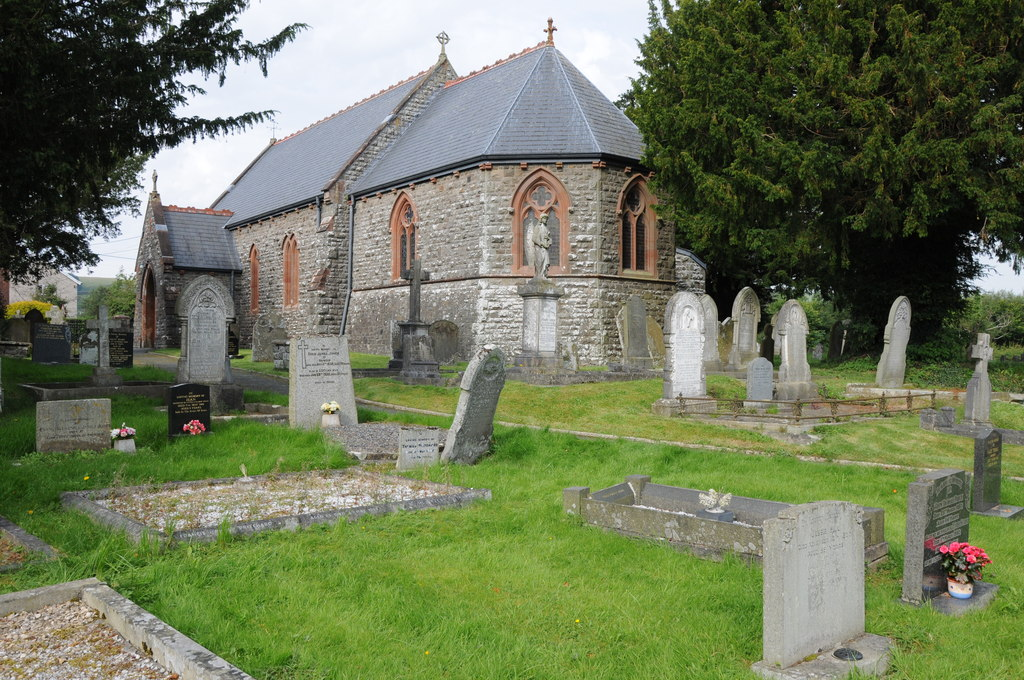
Church of St Llyr

The Church of St Llyr lies to the south of the village, on the west of the A4081 road to Rhayader. Rebuilt entirely from 1885 to 1887, little remains of the original church apart from the very front of the building. The churchyard contains one war grave, of a Royal Flying Corps officer of World War I.

It is a grade II* listed building.
