= Llanddew =

- Village and community
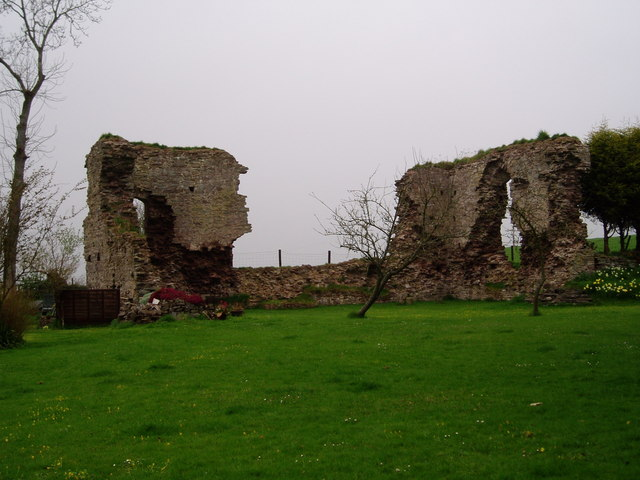
- Remains of the Bishop's Palace, favoured residence of Giraldus Cambrensis (Gerald of Wales)

- Location within Powys
- Principal area: Powys
- Country: Wales
- Sovereign state: United Kingdom
- Police: Dyfed-Powys
- Fire: Mid and West Wales
- Ambulance: Welsh
- List of places UK Wales Powys 51.9671°N 3.3763°W Community map: Map of the community

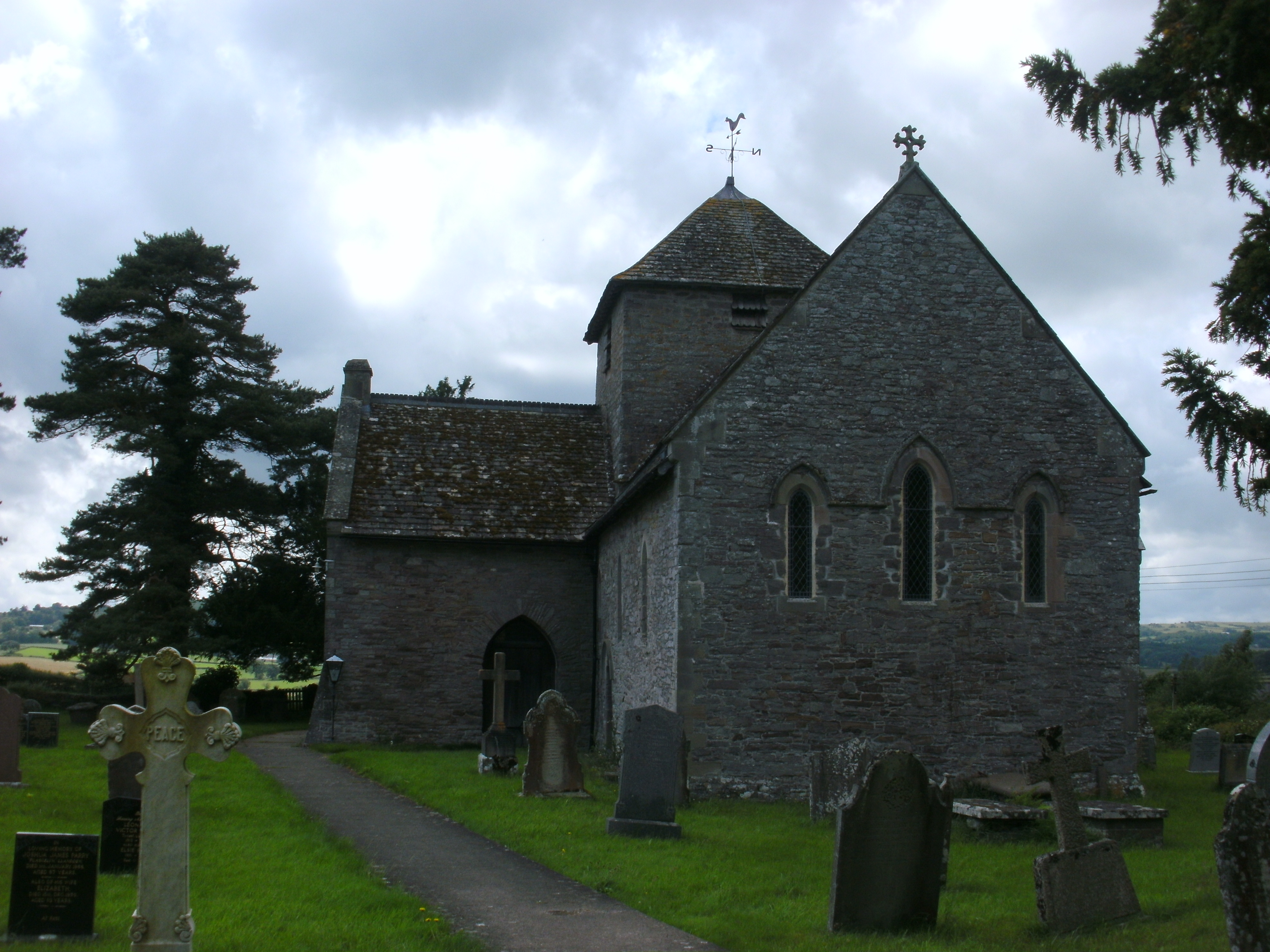
St David's parish church

Llanddew is a small village and community about 2 km or 1 mile north-east of Brecon, Powys, Wales. The population as of the 2011 UK Census was 232. It is in the historic county of Brecknockshire (Breconshire).

Its manor belongs to the Bishops of Saint Davids, who formerly had a residence or bishop's palace there, of which some ruins still remain. These incorporate a double-sided vaulted well, known as Bishop Gower's Well.

Llanddew Palace was the favoured residence of 12th-13th century clergyman and author Giraldus Cambrensis (Gerald of Wales), and hosted the Archbishop of Canterbury Baldwin of Exeter in 1188 during his mission through Wales recruiting for the Crusades.

St David's Church, Llanddew is the oldest church in the historic county of Brecknockshire. The building dates from around the 13th century and has a cruciform shape, with a central tower. At one time, there were monastic buildings at the church, and the monks would go around the local area preaching and giving communion.
