= Gladestry =

Village and community in Powys, Wales

Coordinates: 52°11′N 3°08′W

Gladestry: Welsh: Llanfair Llythynwg
- Village and community
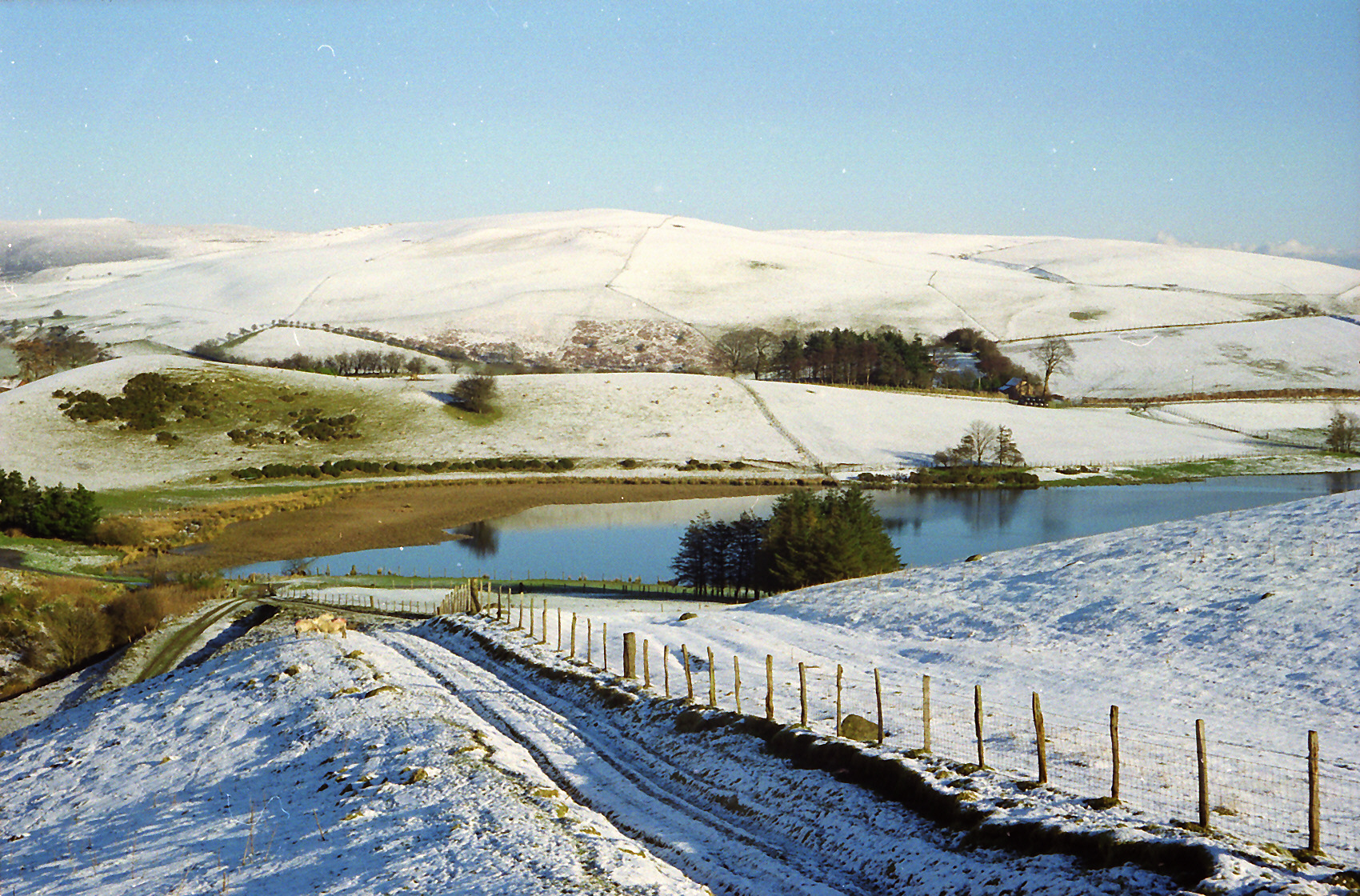
- Radnor Forest from the south

- Location within Powys
- Principal area: Powys
- Country: Wales
- Sovereign state: United Kingdom
- Police: Dyfed-Powys
- Fire: Mid and West Wales
- Ambulance: Welsh
- List of places UK Wales Powys Community map: Map of the community

Gladestry (Welsh: Llanfair Llythynwg) is a small village and community in Radnorshire, Powys, mid-Wales, close to the border with England at the end of the Hergest Ridge and south of the large moorland area of Radnor Forest. People living in Gladestry rely on the nearby town of Kington, Herefordshire, for shops, employment, and public services.

Local employment is provided mainly by agriculture and a local quarry. The village has a parish church, St Mary's, which is a Grade I listed building, a pub, a primary school which educates around 50–60 children and a village hall. In the 2001 census the population of the community was 419, reducing slightly to 412 at the 2011 census. In the 2021 census, Gladestry had a population of 440, with 98.2% being white, 7.9% able to speak Welsh, and 2.7% born outside of the United Kingdom.

The community includes Newchurch and Michaelchurch-on-Arrow, where another church, St Michael's is also a Grade I listed building. The Grade II* listed 17th-century manor house, Baynham Hall, is in the hamlet of Michaelchurch-on-Arrow.

Offa's Dyke Path passes through the village and there are various footpaths and bridleways for walkers, cyclists and horse riders.
