= St Michael's Church, Michaelchurch-on-Arrow =

Church in Powys, Wales

Coordinates: 52.1495°N 3.1013°W

St Michael's, Michaelchurch-on-Arrow
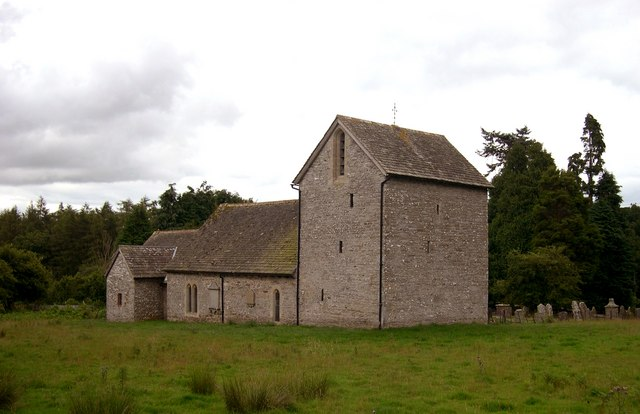

- Location in Powys
- OS grid reference: SO 247 507
- Location: Michaelchurch-on-Arrow, Gladestry, Powys
- Country: Wales
- Denomination: Church of England

History
- Status: active
- Dedication: Saint Michael

Architecture
- Heritage designation: Grade I
- Designated: 21 September 1962
- Architectural type: Church
- Groundbreaking: 13th century

Administration
- Diocese: Hereford
- Archdeaconry: Archdeaconry of Hereford
- Deanery: Kington and Weobley
- Parish: Brilley with Michaelchurch-on-Arrow

St Michael's Church is an active parish church in the village of Michaelchurch-on-Arrow, Gladestry, Powys, Wales. Despite its location in Wales, St Michael's is a member of the Church of England, administered through the parish of Brilley with Michaelchurch-on-Arrow in the Diocese of Hereford. Built in the 13th century, the church is designated by Cadw as a Grade I listed building.

== History ==
The Church of St Michael stands in a rectangular churchyard in the centre of the hamlet of Michaelchurch-on-Arrow, near Gladestry, close to the border with England and 8km from Kington, Herefordshire. The church dates from the 13th century, although possibly with earlier origins, and was restored in 1869.

Although located in Wales, St Michael's is a church of the Church of England, administered through the parish of Brilley with Michaelchurch-on-Arrow in the Diocese of Hereford.

== Architecture and description ==
St Michael's consists of a nave, a chancel, a western tower and a south porch and a northern vestry. The building material is mainly local rubble, with slate roof. The Royal Commission on the Ancient and Historical Monuments of Wales (RCAHMW) records the presence of a ciborium, pre-dating the Reformation, a survival that RCAHMW suggests may be unique in Wales. The Cadw listing record reports that the four central bosses carry carved heads which have been identified as depicting an unknown Bishop of Hereford, Henry IV, his wife, Joan of Navarre and a grotesque, which are dated to around 1410. Robert Scourfield and Richard Haslam, in their Powys volume in the Buildings of Wales series, note the stained glass by Mayer & Co. which they describe as having "typical, dramatic colours". St Michael's is a Grade I listed building.

== Sources ==
- Scourfield, Robert; Haslam, Richard (2013). Powys: Montgomeryshire, Radnorshire and Breconshire. The Buildings of Wales. New Haven, US and London: Yale University Press. ISBN 978-0-300-18508-9. OCLC 863678002.
