= Gwrthwl =

Saint Gwrthwl is a Pre-Congregational Saint of Powys in Wales.

He was said to have been a hermit and to have founded a church in the village of Llanwrthwl. The site of his church yielded artefacts form the Bronze Age and Roman Empire.

He is remembered as 'The Confessor', and his Feast Day is commemorated on 2 March.
