= Glascwm =

- Community
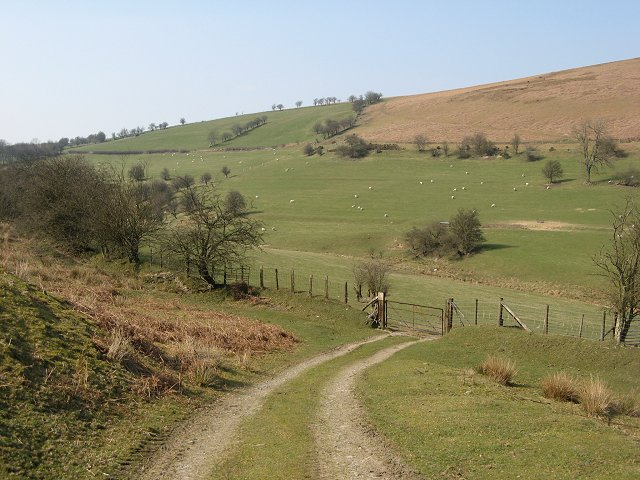
- Glascwm-îg High valley over the Rhiw Fwnws pass from Glascwm. Usual sheep pastures.
- Principal area: Powys
- Country: Wales
- Sovereign state: United Kingdom
- Police: Dyfed-Powys
- Fire: Mid and West Wales
- Ambulance: Welsh
- List of places UK Wales Powys 52°10′0″N 3°14′0″W Map of the community

Glascwm is a community in the upper Edw valley in Radnorshire, Powys, Wales. The main settlement is concentrated in the two centrally located small villages of Frank's Bridge, located on the eastern slope of the valley, and Hundred House, located on the river terrace on the western side of the Edw. The remainder of the population lives in scattered farms and dwellings and in the four rural settlements of Cregrina, Glascwm, Bettws Diserth and Llansantffraed-in-Elwel. The surrounding area has extensive uninhabited uplands of moorland at Carneddau, Gilwern Hill, Gwaunceste Hill, Little Hill and Glascwm Hill. The A481 passes through the area. In 2005 Powys county council recorded a population of 479, increasing to 551 at the 2011 Census.

== History ==
A Clas community (352 A.D.) was established in Glascwm within the cantref (medieval Welsh land division) of Elfael, (one of a number of Welsh kingdoms occupying the region between the River Wye and River Severn), possibly as early as the 6th century. St David's biographer, Rhygyfarch, claimed that St David founded the monastery, but this cannot be proved, even though the dedication is to the saint. Nevertheless, this is believed to have been one of the main churches in pre-Conquest Radnorshire.

Glascwm was also the location of a miraculous hand-bell mentioned by Giraldus Cambrensis (Gerald of Wales) in the late 12th century.

The earliest documentary record of the area is in the biography of St David which dates from c.1090, where the place name is recorded as Glascun.

In the late 13th century, Glascwm was one of several places in the region for which Thomas, Bishop of St David's granted the right to the Lord of The Manor to hold a market or fair.

John Leland in the mid-16th century recorded 'Glascumbe, wher[e] is a chirche but few houses'. But he also stated that Glascwm did lie on an important drovers' road through central Wales which functioned during the post-medieval era and probably had its origins in the later medieval era.

== See also ==
- List of communities in Wales
