= Llanwrthwl =

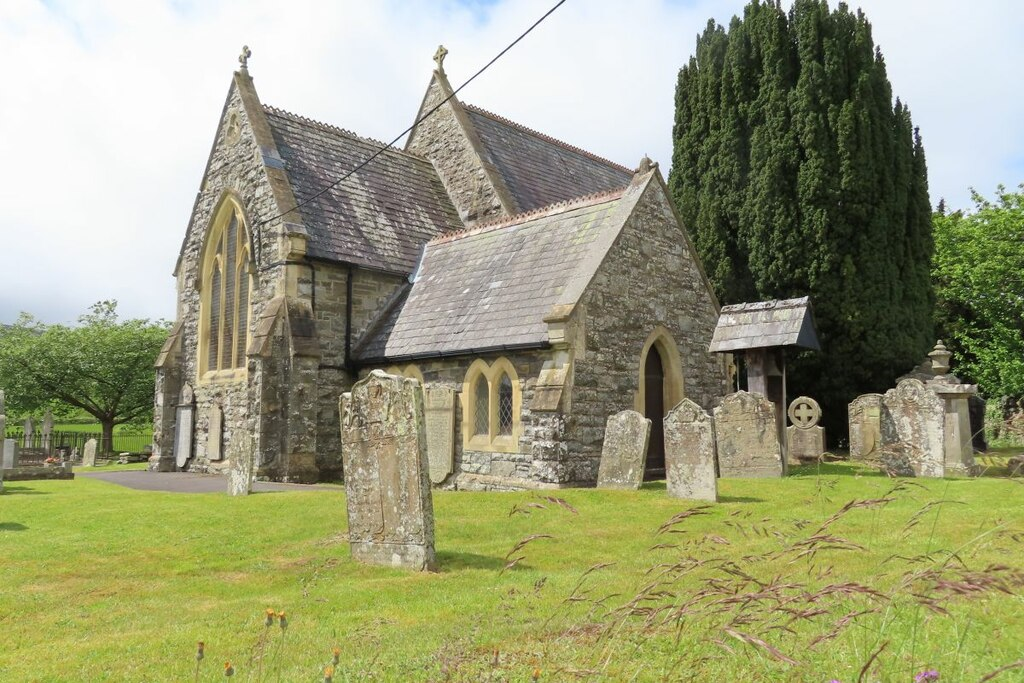
- St. Gwrthwl's parish church, 2021

- Location within Powys
- Population: 181 (2021)
- Principal area: Powys
- Preserved county: Powys
- Country: Wales
- Sovereign state: United Kingdom
- Post town: Llandrindod Wells
- Postcode district: LD1
- Police: Dyfed-Powys
- Fire: Mid and West Wales
- Ambulance: Welsh
- UK Parliament: Brecon, Radnor and Cwm Tawe
- List of places UK Wales Powys 52.266667°N 3.5°W Community map: Map of the community

Llanwrthwl (Welsh pronunciation) is a village and community in Powys, mid Wales, and the historic county of Brecknockshire. Llanwrthwl lies off the A470 road, north by road from Builth Wells and Newbridge-on-Wye and south of Rhayader. It lies on the River Wye and Afon Elan and the village is accessed by a bridge over the Wye.

In 1833 its population was 517; its population in 1841 was 568; in 1845, its population was 563. At the 2011 Census the population was 191 and in the 2021 Census it was 181.

== Etymology ==
Llanwrthwl, composed of an Upper and a Lower division, derives its name from the dedication of its church, Saint Gwrthwl.

== History ==
Saint Grwthwl, whose date is uncertain, is reputed to have founded the parish church at Llanwrthwl; he is commemorated on 2 March. Bronze Age gold work was discovered at Llanwrthwl in the 1950s, including a four-flanged bar torc, a circular sectioned bar torc, a square sectioned bar torc and a twisted ring.

A commemorative stone, from the precincts of the extinct chapel of Llanwrthwl, was found at Maes Llanwrthwl (Llanwrthwl Field) with a Paulinus monument and the epitaph: Talorm | Adventvh | MAQVERIGH | FIUIVS. It was in several pieces, and at least one of those pieces was missing. It was later preserved and housed at the residence of the Jones family at Dolau Cothi, Carmarthenshire.

The parish was a prebend in the Collegiate Church of Brecknock and the church was dedicated to St Gwrthwl. In 1840s there was a day school in the upper part of the parish, attended by about 30 children. There was also a Sunday School. A sum of £16 was divided among the poor in January of each year, arising partly from a 1648 bequest by Edward ab Evan of the farm Cae'r Llan.

== Geography ==
The village lies on the River Wye and Afon Elan and the village is accessed by a bridge over the Wye.

In the 19th century, Llanwrthwl was in the county of Brecknockshire, and was a parish in the cantref of Buallt. The village is situated upon the Afon Elan, near to its union with the River Wye, about 3 miles (4.8 km), south by east, from Rhayader. Llanwrthwl parish is situated at the northern extremity of the county, bordering upon Radnorshire, from which it is separated on the north and north-east by the River Wye, and on the west and north-west by the streams of the Claerwen and Elan, which fall into that river, on the northeastern confines of the parish. The rivulets Runnant and Dulas are the principal of the smaller streams that intersect the parish. It comprises about 12,000 acres (4,900 ha) of extremely irregular surface, rising in some parts into lofty hills, alternated with large tracts of level ground, forming extensive commons and bogs. The soil on the higher grounds is rocky, and in the lower generally of a marshy nature, but on the banks of the Wye and Elan there are some fertile meadows. The surrounding scenery is diversified, and in many parts highly picturesque. Copper ore has been found near the junction of the Elan with the Wye.

On the hills are several cairns, especially on the height named Drygarn, or Derwydd Garn, implying "the Druid's rock, or mount," part of which is in the adjoining parish of Llanfihangel Abergwesyn. There are also some cairns on an eminence of less elevation, designated Gemrhiw. On Rhos-Saithmaen, or "the Seven Stone common," which is partly in this parish, and partly in that of Llanafan, are some stones very irregularly placed. Near this common is another, called Rhos-y-Beddau, or "the common of the graves," the name of which would appear to commemorate some great battle, probably that of Llechryd in 1087.

== Notable landmarks ==
St. Gwrthwl's is the Church in Wales parish church, dating from the Victorian era, when it was wholly rebuilt, by architect J. G. Finch Noyes, in 1875. An earlier church is recorded for 1291 in the ecclesiastical assessment of English and Welsh churches, the Taxatio Ecclesiastica. Probably dating from the 12th century, the oldest internal feature is a Norman font. It is reputed to have been recovered from Cwmhir Abbey and the time of the Reformation, but is roughly carved, casting doubt on this theory. The vestry has a medieval piscina.

The churchyard has a prehistoric standing stone about 1.75 metres (5 ft 9 in) high near the south porch. Its upper part appears to have been broken, though it may be the shaft of a cross, or of Druidical origin. On Rhôs Saith-maen, or the "Seven Stone Common", in Llanwrthwl parish, are some very irregularly placed stones, though it has not been determined if they are of military, sepulchral, or Druidical remains.

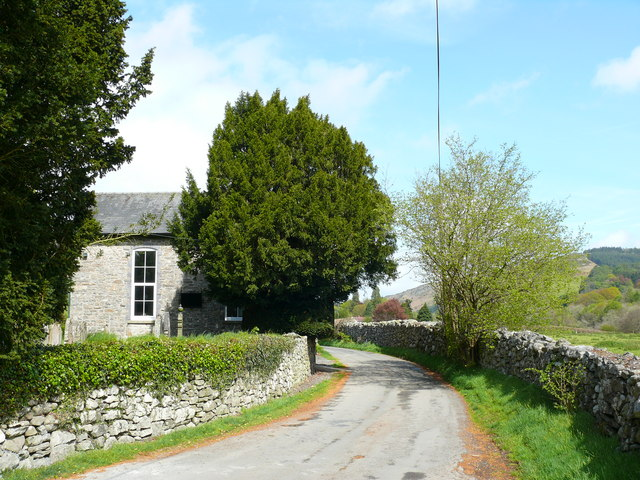
Penuel Congregational Chapel

Penuel Congregational Chapel is located just south of the main village. The chapel was built in 1832 and rebuilt in 1890 in the Vernacular style with a long-wall entry plan. A register of baptisms for the years 1834–1837 is held by the National Archive.

The Living Willow Theatre (in Welsh, Glôb Byw) is at Penlanole near the village. It is an open-air theatre constructed of living willow trees and occasionally outdoor performances of William Shakespeare are staged.

In the early 1800s, engineer James Watt retired to Doldowlod House, about 1 mile (1.6 km) south of Llanwrthwl on the A470 road, when he left Birmingham. By 1891 the grand Glan-Rhos House had been built to the north of the village with surrounding grounds laid out stretching down to the river.

The village pub, the Vulcan Arms, at one time called the Middleton Arms, is now a private residence used as a holiday home, and known as Vulcan Lodge.

== Flora ==
Alchemilla arvensis, Chrysanthemum segetum, and Galeopsis versicolor, have been found in Llanwrthwl, while Euphorbia helioscopia has been found nearby.
