= Bleddfa =

Coordinates: 52.307009°N 3.163158°W

- Location within Powys
- OS grid reference: SO 2079 6829
  - Cardiff: 57 mi (92 km)
  - London: 141 mi (227 km)
- Community: Llangunllo
- Principal area: Powys
- Country: Wales
- Sovereign state: United Kingdom
- Post town: KNIGHTON
- Postcode district: LD7
- Police: Dyfed-Powys
- Fire: Mid and West Wales
- Ambulance: Welsh
- UK Parliament: Brecon, Radnor and Cwm Tawe
- Senedd Cymru – Welsh Parliament: Brecon and Radnorshire

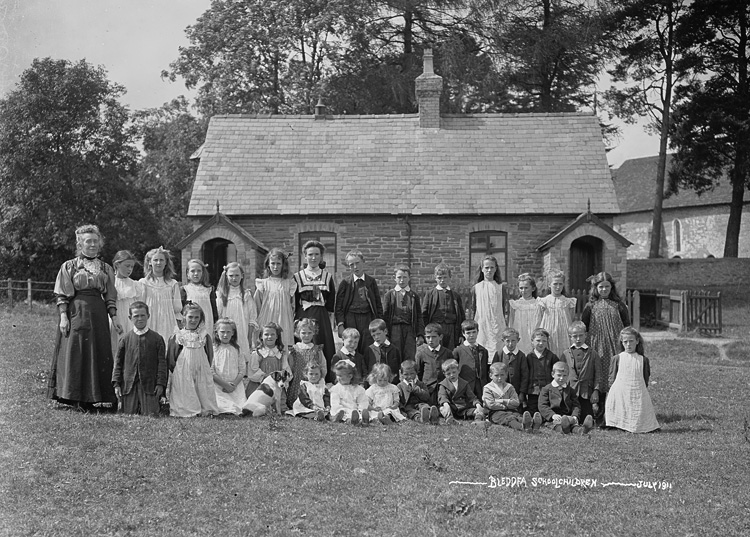
Bleddfa school children; July 1911.

Bleddfa is a village which lies on the road from Knighton to Penybont and is located in the community of Llangunllo, Powys, Wales. It is 5 miles (8 km) from Knighton. Until 1983 Bleddfa was a community itself.

Two hillforts dating to around 200 BC guard the village: Clog Hill above the village, and Llysin Hill to the west.

St Mary Magdalene's Church, Bleddfa dates from the 13th century. In the 19th century part of the building was used as a schoolroom. It is a Grade I listed building.

In 1766, the Swiss philosopher Jean-Jacques Rousseau, whose ideas were instrumental in underpinning the French Revolution, was offered lodgings in a 16th-century grange house called 'Monaughty' which was near Bleddfa. He was so enamoured by Wales during his stay that he hoped Wales would be his final resting place (though he eventually died in Ermenonville, France).

== See also ==
- List of localities in Wales by population
