= St Mary's Church, Gladestry =

Church in Powys, Wales

Coordinates: 52.1888°N 3.1268°W

St Mary's,
- Church of St Mary the Virgin
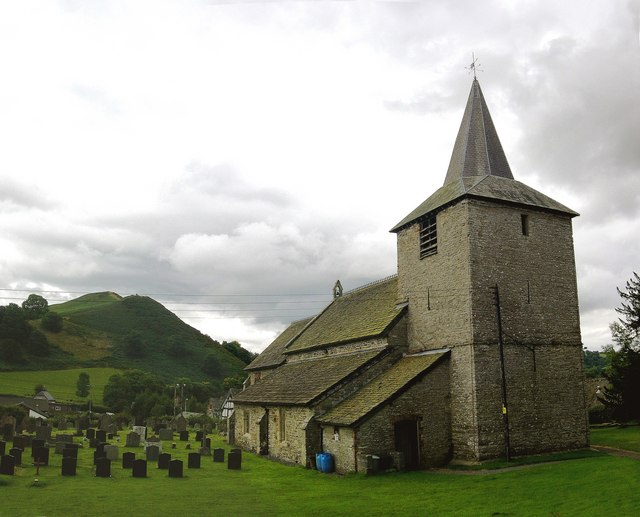

- Location in Powys
- OS grid reference: SO 230 551
- Location: Gladestry, Powys
- Country: Wales
- Denomination: Church in Wales

History
- Status: active
- Dedication: Saint Mary the Virgin

Architecture
- Heritage designation: Grade I
- Designated: 21 September 1962
- Architectural type: Church
- Groundbreaking: 13th century

Administration
- Diocese: Swansea and Brecon
- Archdeaconry: Brecon
- Deanery: Radnor and Builth
- Parish: East Radnor Ministry Area

St Mary's Church is an active parish church in the village of Gladestry, Powys, Wales. The village lies east of Builth Wells close to the border with England. The church is designated by Cadw as a Grade I listed building.

== History ==
The Church of St Mary stands in a rectangular churchyard in the centre of the village of Gladestry, some 6km to the west of the Herefordshire town of Kington. The church dates from the 13th century, although possibly with earlier origins, and was enlarged in the 14th. The Royal Commission on the Ancient and Historical Monuments of Wales (RCAHMW) records that the spire, atop the 13th-century tower, dates from the 18th century. The church was twice restored, at the beginning and at the end of the 20th century.

The church remains an active parish church in the Diocese of Swansea and Brecon and occasional services are held.

== Architecture and description ==
St Mary's consists of a nave, a chancel with a bellcote above, an aisle, a western tower and a south porch. The building material is mainly local rubble. The roofs and spire are clad in shale slates. Parts of the interior are floored with encaustic tiles by William Godwin & Son of Lugwardine. Robert Scourfield and Richard Haslam, in their Powys volume in the Buildings of Wales series, describe it as a "handsome and relatively large church". St Mary's is as a Grade I listed building.

== Sources ==
- Scourfield, Robert; Haslam, Richard (2013). Powys: Montgomeryshire, Radnorshire and Breconshire. The Buildings of Wales. New Haven, US and London: Yale University Press. ISBN 978-0-300-18508-9. OCLC 863678002.
