= Saint Bilo =

5th-century Welsh saint

- Born: 5th century
- Venerated in: Catholic Church

Saint Bilo (Welsh: Sant Belyau) was a 5th century saint and one of the 24 daughters of Brychan Brycheiniog. She founded a church in Llanfilo, which is now a village in the community of Felin-fach in Powys.

The head of a neighbouring tribe allegedly tried to abduct and rape her in an attempt to force her to marry him.

Parts of her history are thought to have added to Milburgha's stories of Much Wenlock.
