= Newchurch, Powys =

Village in Powys, Wales

Coordinates: 52.149°N 3.148°W

Newchurch (Welsh: Llannewydd) is a small rural village in Powys, Wales, centred around St Mary's Church. The village is within the community of Gladestry, about 5 miles (8.0 km) north of Hay-on-Wye, and is on the Offa's Dyke Path, one of the UK's National Trails.

The church of St Mary is Grade II listed, and was rebuilt in 1856–57. Francis Kilvert, the English clergyman and diarist, was a frequent visitor. The adjoining Great House and its barn are also Grade II listed. Great House is described by Cadw as a "late C15 cruck-framed hall house, notable for the great span of its trusses, at 28ft the widest yet recorded in Wales."

Until 1983 Newchurch was a community.
