= St Issui's Church, Partrishow =

Coordinates: 51.8958°N 3.0494°W

Church of St Issui
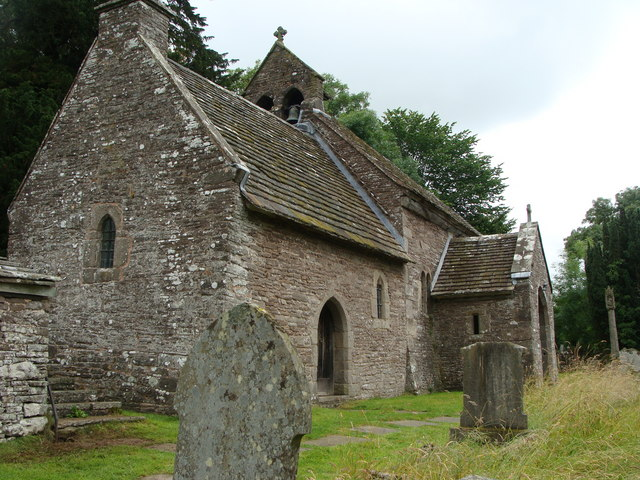
- St. Issui's Church, Partrishow

- Location in Powys
- OS grid reference: SO278224
- Location: Partrishow, Powys
- Country: Wales
- Denomination: Church in Wales
- Website: The Vale of Grwyne website

History
- Status: parish church
- Founded: 1060

Architecture
- Functional status: Active
- Heritage designation: Grade I
- Designated: 19 July 1963
- Architect: W. D. Caröe (restoration)
- Architectural type: Church

Administration
- Diocese: Swansea and Brecon
- Archdeaconry: Brecon
- Deanery: Greater Brecon
- Parish: The Vale of Grwyne

Clergy
- Vicar: Rev. C. P. Bowler

The Church of St Issui, Partrishow, Powys, Wales, is a Grade I listed parish church dating from 1060. The existing building was mainly constructed in the 14th and 15th centuries and was sensitively restored in 1908–1909. The church is most famous for its rood screen which dates from 1500. It is a Grade I listed building.

== History ==
Issui was an early Welsh saint who lived by the well next to the site of the church. Following his murder, the well became a place of pilgrimage and the church was founded with the offerings of pilgrims in 1060. Gerald of Wales is reputed to have preached at the church in 1188 while on his tour of Wales recruiting men for the Third Crusade. The church was undamaged during the Reformation, the dual altars being spared by the order of Edward VI in 1550. The church similarly escaped any large-scale Victorian reconstruction and was carefully restored by W. D. Caröe in 1908–1909. The church remains an active church in the parish of the Vale of Grwyne.

== Architecture and description ==
The church comprises a nave, chancel and porch with a separate shrine-chapel to the West. The walls are of rubble and the roofs of slate. The style throughout is Gothic. The wall to the right of the porch has a rare stone bench facing the preaching cross in the churchyard. The bellcote holds two bells and is a stone replacement by Caröe for the timber original.

The nave has a roof of the 16th century. It is windowless to the North, with windows of a Tudor date inserted in the South wall. The wagon roof of the chancel is a replacement by Caröe. The rood screen is the highlight of the interior. In the Powys volume of The Buildings of Wales series, the architectural historians Richard Scourfield and Robert Haslam record a description of it as, "the most perfect and elegant now standing in the kingdom". It dates from 1500 and was sensitively restored by Caröe. It stretches the entire width of the nave, and has a frieze of dragons or wyverns expectorating vines. The writer Simon Jenkins describes it as "exquisitely wrought".

In addition to the rood screen, the church has a significant collection of wall paintings. They comprise four groups: a Stuart Coat of Arms which the Royal Commission on the Ancient and Historical Monuments of Wales considers are those of James I; two groups of Biblical texts, including the Lord's Prayer, the Decalogue and the Apostles' Creed; and a "Doom Figure" of Death as a skeleton with an hourglass and spade in his left hand and a scythe in his right, which dates from the 17th or 18th century.

The church is a Grade I listed building. A number of structures in the vicinity of the church have their own Grade II listings including St Issui's Well, the churchyard cross, the former stable, and the lych gate.

== Gallery ==
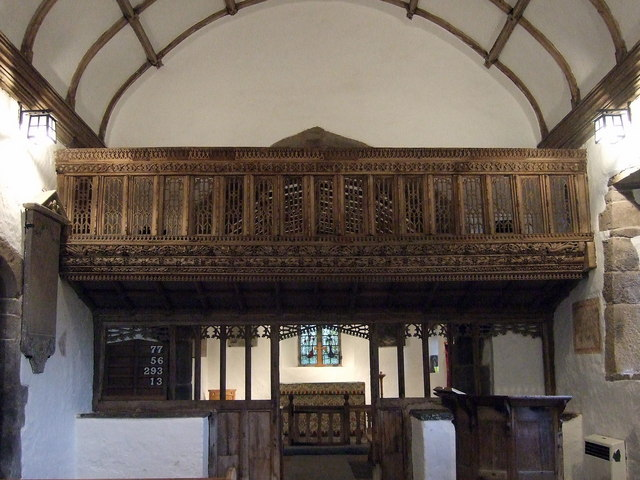
"The most perfect and elegant rood loft now standing in the kingdom" (Scourfield & Haslam)

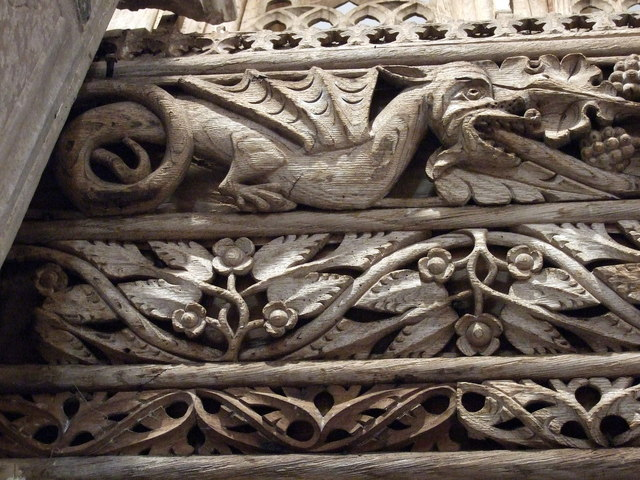
Rood screen detail

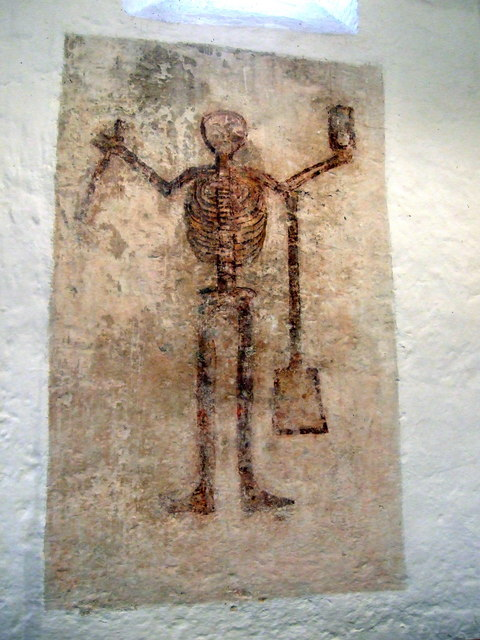
The 'Doom or Death' figure dating from 17/18th century on an interior church wall

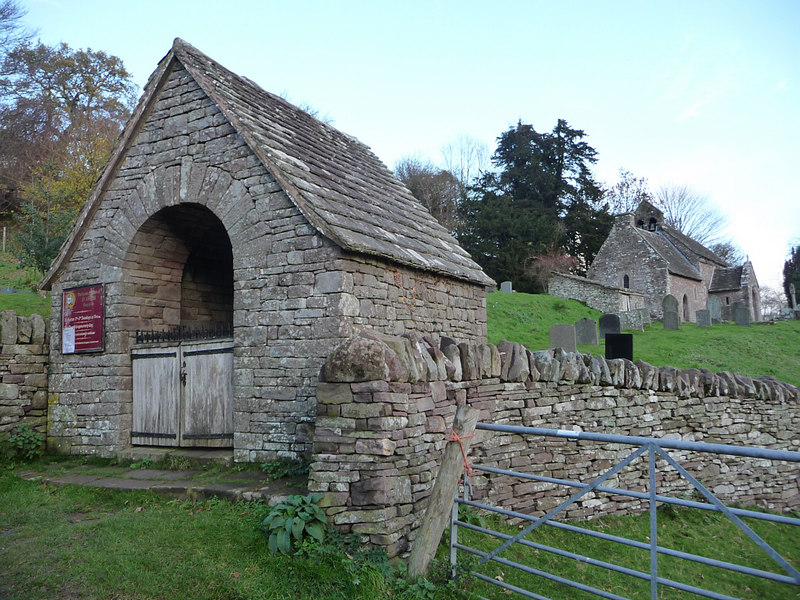
The lychgate with the church behind

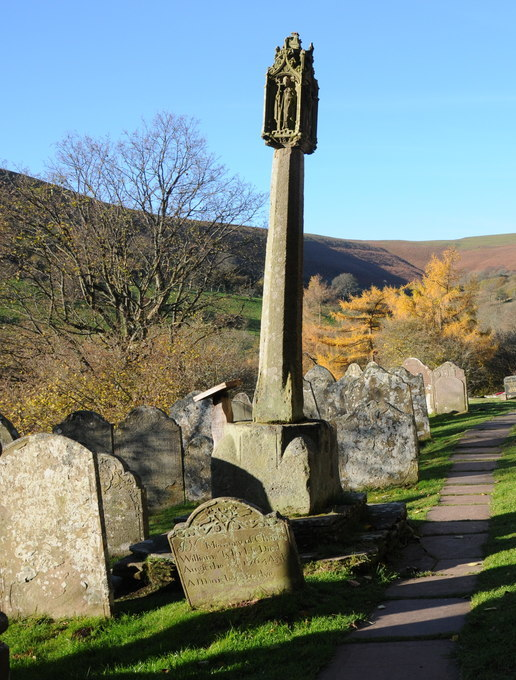
The preaching cross
