= Brecknockshire =

Historic county of Wales

Coordinates: 52°00′N 3°25′W

Brecknockshire Sir Frycheiniog (Welsh)
- Historic county
- 1536–1974
- Area
  - 1831: 460,158 acres (1,862.19 km^{2})
  - 1911: 469,281 acres (1,899.11 km^{2})
  - 1961: 469,281 acres (1,899.11 km^{2})
- Population
  - 1831: 47,763
  - 1901: 54,213
  - 1971: 53,381
- Density
  - 1831: 0.1/acre
- Status: Non-administrative county (1536–1889); Administrative county (1889–1974); Historic county (non-administrative)
- Chapman code: BRE
- Government: Brecknockshire County Council (1889–1974)
  - HQ: Brecon
  - Motto: Undeb Hedd Llwyddiant (Unity, Peace, Prosperity)
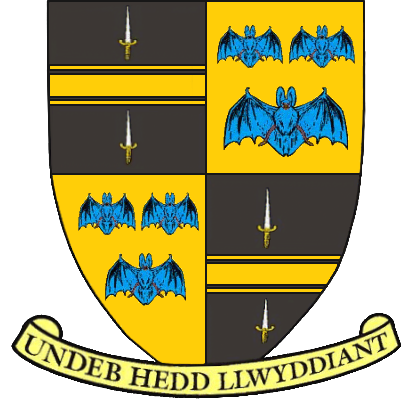
- History
  - Established: 1536
  - Council established: 1889
  - Disestablished: 1974
Preceded by	Succeeded by
Brycheiniog	Powys; Borough of Brecknock

Brecknockshire (Welsh: Brycheiniog or Sir Frycheiniog), also known as the County of Brecknock, Breconshire, or the County of Brecon, was one of the thirteen counties of Wales that existed from 1536 until their abolition in 1974. It was created in 1536 under the Laws in Wales Act 1535, and from 1889 it was an administrative county with a county council; the administrative county was abolished in 1974. The county was named after the medieval Welsh territory of Brycheiniog, which was anglicised to Brecknock and also gave its name to the county town of Brecon. The former county's area is mountainous and primarily rural.

== Geography ==
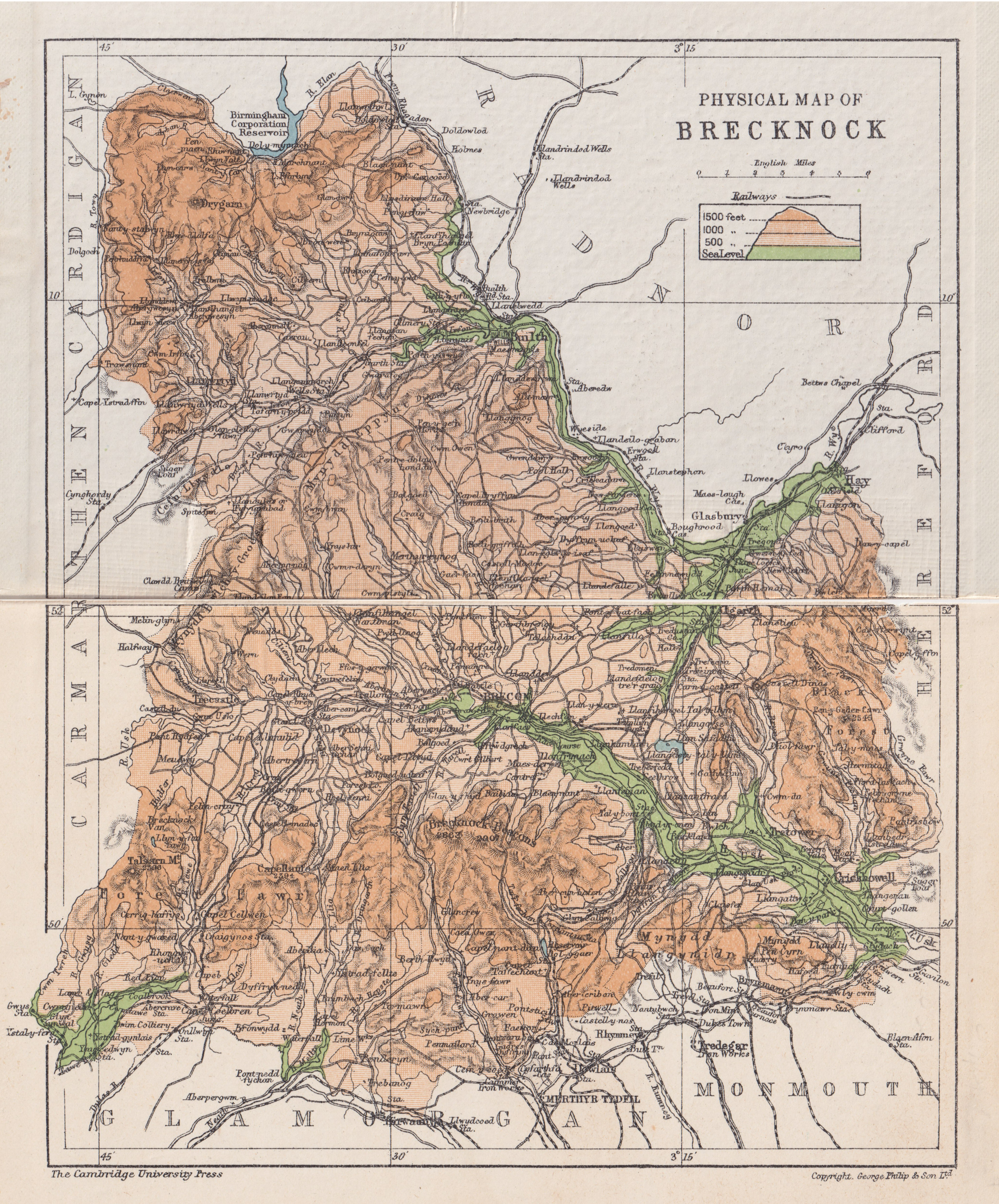
Map of Brecknockshire (1912)

Brecknockshire was bounded to the north by Radnorshire, to the east by Herefordshire and Monmouthshire, to the south by Monmouthshire and Glamorgan, and to the west by Carmarthenshire and Cardiganshire.

The county is predominantly rural and mountainous. The Black Mountains occupy the southeast of the area, the Brecon Beacons the central region, Fforest Fawr the southwest and Mynydd Epynt the north. Its highest point is Pen y Fan, 2907 ft (886 m). The River Wye traces nearly the whole of the northern boundary, and the Usk flows in an easterly direction through the central valley. The main towns are Brecon, Beaufort, Brynmawr, Builth Wells, Crickhowell, Hay-on-Wye, Llanelly, Llanwrtyd Wells, Rassau, Talgarth, Vaynor and Ystradgynlais.

== History ==
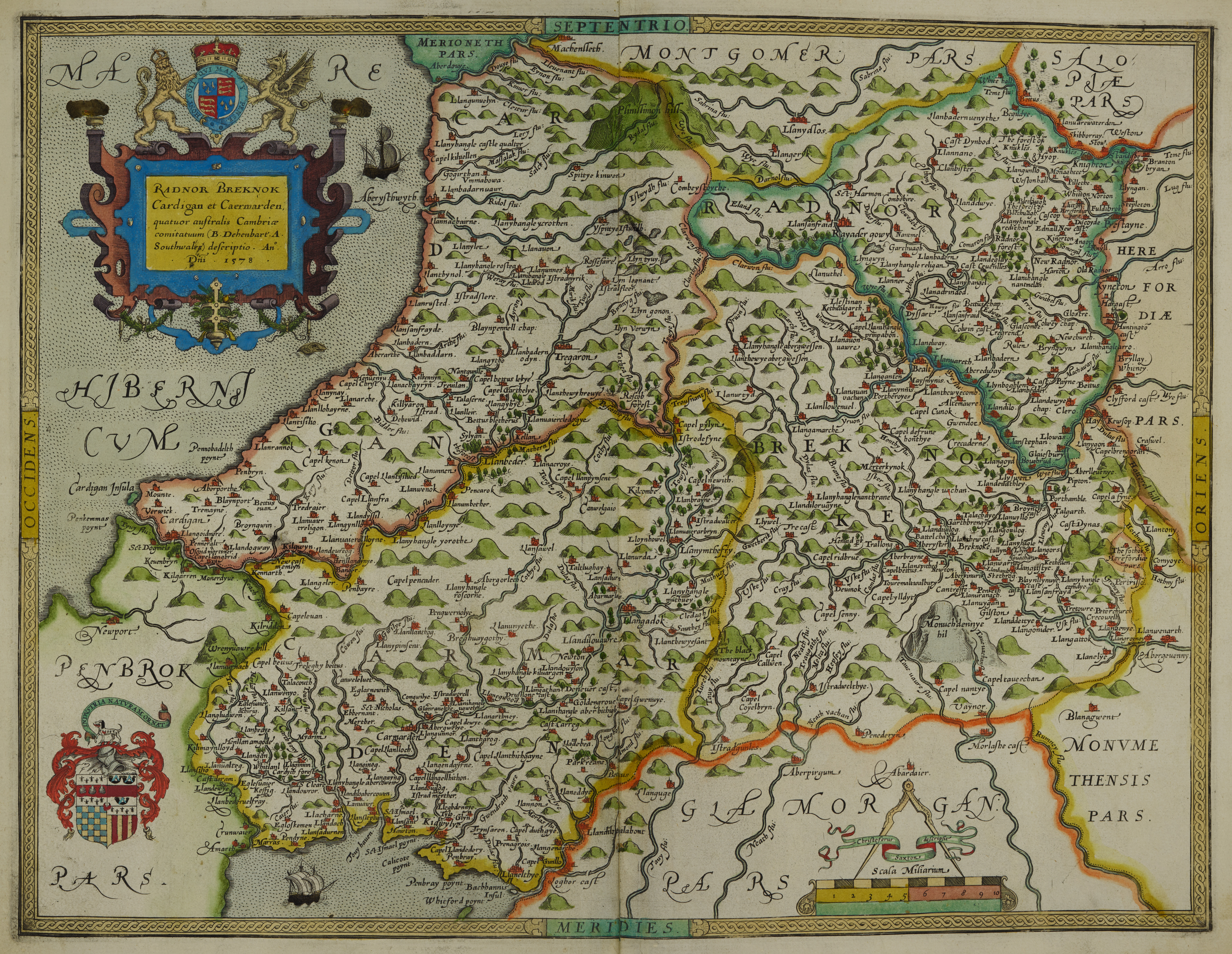
Hand-drawn map of Radnorshire, Brecknockshire, Ceredigion and Carmarthenshire by Christopher Saxton in 1578

The county of Brecknock was created in 1536 under the Laws in Wales Act 1535, which formally incorporated Wales into the Kingdom of England and extended English models of government, including counties, across all of Wales. Previously the Brecknockshire area had been subdivided into various smaller marcher lordships and other territories. The largest of these were the Lordship of Brecknock, which had its roots in the medieval Welsh kingdom of Brycheiniog, and the cantref of Buellt.

=== Brycheiniog ===
The origins of later Brycheineiog are very shadowy as no early record of it being an independent kingdom in Vth and VIth century AD exists. The name Bricheniauc / Bricheineiog first appears in Annales Cambriae (Xth century AD text in an entry for 895) and the Xth century Haerleian genealogies. Legend says that the name derive from Brychan mac Anlach, an unattested 5th century ruler of the area, who is said to have received it as a dowry from his father-in-law Tewdrig ap Teithfallt. We only know for that period, a series of commemorative stones, showing the existence of an elite but no dominant leader for a "kingdom".

So it would seems that in its early phase it was just a zone of influence under Gwent and that it's not unntil the IXth that a kingdom of Brycheiniog clearly emerged and its final days in the Xth often acted as a buffer between ngland to the east and the powerful south Welsh kingdom of Deheubarth to the west. No much later, it was aborbed by Deheubarth and formalized into a cantrefi, ancestor of the county Brecknockshire / Sir Frycheiniog / the shire of Brycheiniog, while maintaining its integrity up to Norman times.

=== Cantref of Buellt ===
Buellt or Builth was a cantref in medieval Wales, located west of the River Wye. Unlike most cantrefs, it was not part of any of the major Welsh kingdoms for most of its history, but was instead ruled by an autonomous local dynasty. During the Norman invasion of Wales, the Marcher Lord Philip de Braose conquered Buellt around 1095. The area then changed hands between multiple Norman and Welsh figures. In November 1282, Edward I overran Buellt as part of his final conquest of Wales and the cantref became a crown possession.

=== Lordship of Brecknock ===
Bernard de Neufmarché was a minor Norman lord who rose to power in the Welsh Marches before successfully undertaking the invasion and conquest of the Kingdom of Brycheiniog between 1088 and 1095. Bernard established a Marcher Lordship in its place – the Lordship of Brecknock.

The lordship was ruled by numerous families over the next 400 years. By the early Tudor period, it was ruled by the Earls of Buckingham. When Edward Stafford, 3rd Duke of Buckingham, was executed for treason, having been suspected of plotting against King Henry VIII, the Lordship was forfeited to the crown. Henry VIII combined it with the cantref of Buellt.

By his Laws in Wales Acts, Henry converted the combined territory - the Lordships of Brecknock and Buellt - into Brecknockshire, subject to standard English law.

=== Creation of county ===
The Laws in Wales Act 1535 created the County of Brecknock by combining a number of "lordships, towns, parishes, commotes and cantreds" in the "Country or Dominion of Wales". The areas combined were: "Brekenoke" (Brecknock), "Crekehowell" (Crickhowell) "Tretowre", "Penkelly", "Englisshe Talgarth", "Welsshe Talgarth", "Dynas", "The Haye" (Hay-on-Wye), "Glynebogh", "Broynlles" (Bronllys), "Cantercely" (Cantref Selyf), "Llando Blaynllynby", "Estrodewe", "Buelthe" (Builth), and "Llangors". The town of Brecknock or Brecon was declared the county town.

The county was divided into six hundreds in 1542: Builth, Crickhowell, Devynnock, Merthyr, Penkelly, and Talgarth. Brecknock was the only borough in the county. Other market towns were Builth, Crickhowell and Hay-on-Wye. Under the terms of the 1535 legislation one member of parliament was returned for the borough and one for the county.

=== Breconshire County Council ===
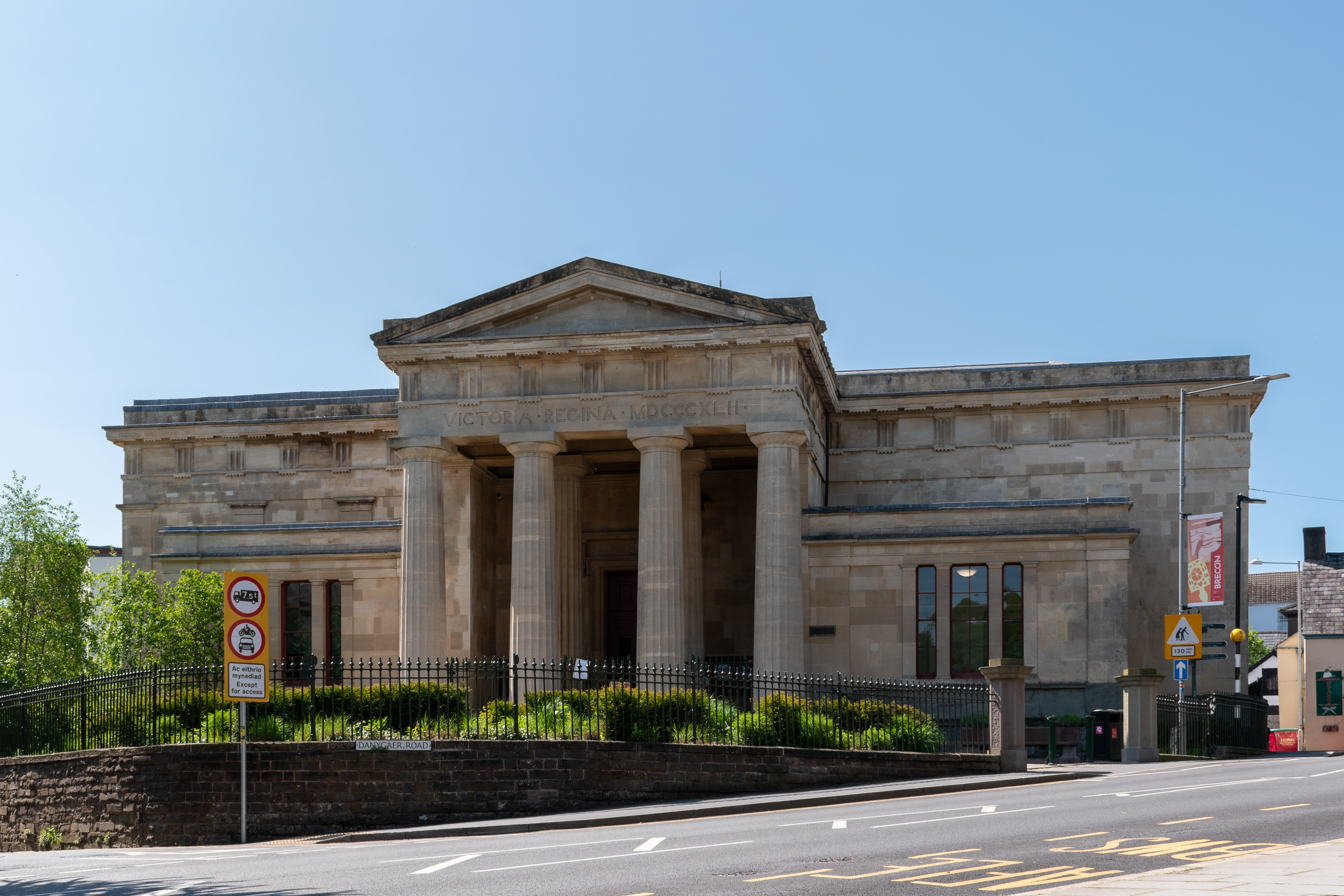
Shire Hall, Brecon: County council's meeting place.

Elected county councils were created in 1889 under the Local Government Act 1888, taking over administrative functions which had previously been performed by unelected magistrates at the quarter sessions. The 1888 act also directed that urban sanitary districts which straddled county boundaries should be placed wholly in the county which had the majority of the population. Along Brecknockshire's southern border with Monmouthshire, there were four such urban sanitary districts which straddled the county boundary: Brynmawr, Ebbw Vale, Rhymney, and Tredegar. Brynmawr was placed entirely in Brecknockshire, whilst Ebbw Vale, Rhymney and Tredegar were placed entirely in Monmouthshire. Brecknockshire therefore gained the southern parts of Brynmawr, but ceded to Monmouthshire the Llechryd area (in Rhymney district), the Dukestown area (in Tredegar district) and the Beaufort and Rassau areas (in Ebbw Vale district).

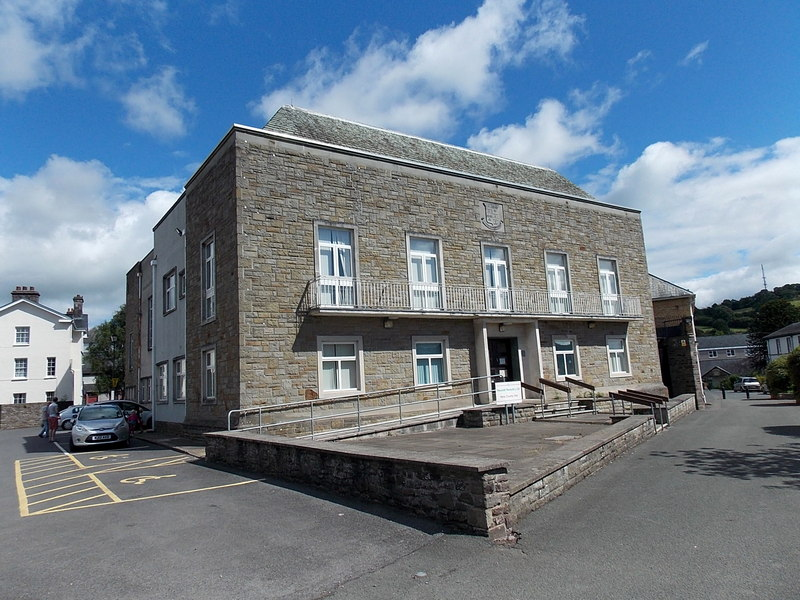
New County Hall, Captain's Walk, Brecon: County council's main offices, built 1962 and demolished 2016.

The county council held its meetings at Brecon Shire Hall, the county's main courthouse, which had been built in 1842 and was also the meeting place of the quarter sessions. The county council's main offices were at Watton Mount, a large house directly opposite the shire hall, until 1962 when New County Hall was built immediately behind the shire hall. Following the local government reorganisation in 1974, the New County Hall became an area office for Powys County Council and also served as offices for the Brecon Beacons National Park Authority for some years, but was demolished in 2016.

The 1535 act which created the county had called it the "County or Shire of Brecknock", and also used the spelling Brecknock for the town. The spelling of the town's name was subsequently standardised to 'Brecon' instead, and there was occasional debate about the correct name of the county. In 1884, the county's magistrates at the quarter sessions decided that 'Brecknock' was the correct form, having been used in the statute creating the county. Conversely, the county council created in 1889 decided by 21 votes to 16 to adopt the name 'Breconshire County Council' rather than 'Council of the County of Brecknock'. Efforts to get the two bodies to agree on a standard form of the name failed. The quarter sessions maintained that they had no authority to go against the form used in statute, whilst the county council went so far as to have erratum slips inserted in books of statistics advising readers that "the words 'Brecknock' and 'Brecknockshire' be throughout read as if the words 'Brecon' and 'Breconshire' had been printed in lieu thereof."

Under the Public Health Act 1848 and the Local Government Act 1858 a number of towns were created local board districts or local government districts respectively, with local boards to govern their areas. In 1875 these, along with the Borough of Brecknock, became urban sanitary districts. At the same time the remainder of the county was divided into rural sanitary districts, some of which crossed county boundaries. The Local Government Act 1894 redesignated these as urban and rural districts. Two civil parishes were administered by rural district councils in neighbouring counties until 1934.

Sanitary district 1875 - 1894	County district 1894 - 1974
Brecknock municipal borough	Brecknock municipal borough
Brecknock RSD	Brecknock RD
Brynmawr LBD (1851)	Brynmawr UD
Builth RSD	Builth RD
Builth RSD	1907: Llanwrtyd UD
Builth LGD (1864)	Builth UD, renamed Builth Wells UD 1898.
Crickhowell RSD	Crickhowell RD
Hay LGD (1864)	Hay UD
Hay RSD	Hay RD
Merthyr Tydfil RSD (part)	Vaynor and Penderyn RD
Neath RSD	Ystradvellte CP (administered as part of Neath RD, Glamorgan) Transferred to Vaynor and Penderyn RD 1934.
Pontardawe RSD (part)	Ystradgynlais RD
Rhayader RSD (part)	Llanwrthwl CP (administered as part of Rhayader RD, Radnorshire) Transferred to Builth RD 1934.

=== Abolition ===
The administrative county of Brecknock was abolished in 1974 by the Local Government Act 1972. The bulk of its area passed to the new county of Powys, where it became the Brecknock District, one of three districts. Along Brecknockshire's southern boundary there were four communities that did not become part of Powys under the 1974 reforms: Penderyn went to the Cynon Valley district of Mid Glamorgan, Vaynor went to Merthyr Tydfil district of Mid Glamorgan, and Brynmawr and Llanelly both went to Blaenau Gwent.

In 1996 a further reorganisation of local government took place in Wales, and Powys became a unitary authority. Powys County Council established a Brecknockshire "shire committee" consisting of councillors elected for electoral divisions within the former Borough of Brecknock. According to the 2001 census the area covered by the shire committee had a population of 42,075. The county council abolished its shire committees in 2018.

== Culture and community ==
The Brecknockshire Agricultural Society, established in 1755, is the oldest continuous such society in Great Britain. The society organises the Brecon County Show, held annually on the 1st Saturday in August at The Showground, Watton, Brecon.

Brecknock Young Farmers has 13 clubs throughout the county. It is affiliated to the National Federation of Young Farmers Clubs.

Brecknock Society and Museum Friends (Welsh: Cymdeithas Brycheiniog a Chyfeillion yr Amgueddfa), found in 1928, is a historical society that promotes "the study and understanding of the Archaeology, History, Geology, Natural History, the Arts and Literature of Wales, especially the historic county of Brecknock." The organization has published the historical journal Brycheiniog since 1955. It is closely associated with funding and running the Y Gaer.

The Brecon Jazz Festival has been held annually since 1984. Normally staged in early August, it has played host to a range of jazz musicians from across the world. A Brecon Fringe Festival organises alternative free music in pubs, hotels, galleries and cafes in the town.

Hay-on-Wye is a destination for bibliophiles in the United Kingdom, with two dozen bookshops, many selling specialist and second-hand books. Richard Booth opened his first shop there in 1962, and by the 1970s Hay had gained the nickname "The Town of Books".

The Hay Festival of Literature and the Arts is a major event in the British cultural calendar. Devised by Norman, Rhoda and Peter Florence in 1988, the festival runs for ten days from May to June. It was described by Bill Clinton in 2001 as "The Woodstock of the mind".

== Transport ==
=== Road ===
The A40 London-West Wales trunk road passes in an east-west direction through the county, entering near Glangrwyney, passing through Crickhowell, by-passing Brecon, leaving the county after passing through Trecastle. The A483 Swansea-Manchester trunk road passes through the north-west, entering south of Llanwrtyd Wells and leaving north of Builth Wells. The A470 Cardiff-Glan Conway trunk road enters the county north of Merthyr Tydfil and, after by-passing Brecon, hugs the eastern border until it leaves the county when it crosses the River Wye at Builth Wells. The A465 (Heads of the Valleys Road) winds in and out of the county, following its southern borders with Monmouthshire and Glamorgan.

=== Rail ===
The Heart of Wales line runs from Cravens Arms in Shropshire to Llanelli in Carmarthenshire. It follows a similar route to the A483 through the north of the county, with stops at Sugar Loaf, Llanwrtyd Wells, Llangammarch Wells, Garth and Cilmeri. Builth Road Station to the north of Builth Wells is situated in Radnorshire. The south of the county once had an extensive rail network with connections through Glamorgan and Monmouthshire to Neath, Merthyr Tydfil, Cardiff, Newport and thence to the main Great Western main line. The Brecon Mountain Railway is a 1 ft 11 3/4 in (603 mm) narrow gauge tourist railway on the south side of the Brecon Beacons. It climbs northwards from Pant (in Glamorgan) along the full length of the Pontsticill Reservoir (also called 'Taf Fechan' reservoir by Welsh Water) and continues past the adjoining Pentwyn reservoir to Torpantau.

=== Cycling ===
The National Cycle Route 8, which runs from Cardiff to Holyhead, passes through the county. From Cefn-coed-y-cymmer to Brecon this follows the Taff Trail.

=== Canal ===
The Monmouthshire and Brecon Canal ran from Brecon to Newport. It was completed at the start of the nineteenth century but closed in 1962. The route from Brecon to Abergavenny has since been re-opened. 35 miles are currently navigable, most of them running through the Brecon Beacons.

== Religious sites ==
St Mary's Church, Brecon is a Grade II* listed building. The structure was originally a chapel of ease for the priory. The 90 feet (27 m) West Tower dates to 1510 and is attributed to Edward, Duke of Buckingham. The eight bells date to 1750.

The Cathedral Church of St John the Evangelist is the cathedral of the Diocese of Swansea and Brecon in the Church in Wales. The cathedral is thought to be on the site of an earlier Celtic church, of which no trace remains. A new church, dedicated to St. John, was built on the orders of Bernard de Neufmarché.

St David's Church, Llanfaes referred to locally as Llanfaes Church, was probably founded in the early sixteenth century. It is probable that the site and the name of the present Church were chosen because of the close proximity of a fresh water well called Ffynnon Dewi (David's Well) which was situated approximately 150 metres south of the church.

Plough Lane Chapel, Brecon, also known as Plough United Reformed Church, is a Grade II* listed building. The present building dates back to 1841 and was re-modelled by Owen Morris Roberts and is considered to be one of the finest chapel interiors in Wales.

The Church of St Elli, Llanelly is dedicated to the 6th-century Saint Elli, who may have been a daughter or granddaughter of King Brychan. The church dates from the 14th century, or earlier, but little remains of this period. The nave is medieval but its walls were all rebuilt in the restorations of the 19th and 20th centuries.

St Mary's Church, Hay-on-Wye consists of a nave and chancel with a square embattled tower at the west end. Separated by a deep dingle, which probably was formerly a moat, it is situated westward of the town upon an almost precipitous eminence, near to the River Wye.

St Edmund's Church, Crickhowell is a Grade II* listed building built in the early 14th century. It has the only shingled spire in the county.

The Church of St Issui, Partrishow dates from 1060. The existing building was mainly constructed in the 14th and 15th centuries. The church is most famous for its rood screen which dates from 1500. It is a Grade I listed building.

St David's Church, Llanddew is one of the oldest churches in Brecknockshire. The building dates from around the 13th century and has a cruciform shape, with a central tower.

== Civil parishes ==
From the medieval period until 1974, Brecknockshire was divided into civil parishes for the purpose of local government; these in large part equated to ecclesiastical parishes (see the table below), most of which still exist as part of the Church in Wales. Chapelries are listed in italics.

Hundred	Parishes
Builth	Alltmawr • Llanafan Fawr • Llanafan Fechan • Llanddewi'r-cwm • Llanfair-ym-muallt/Builth Wells • Llanfihangel Abergwesyn • Llanfihangel Brynpabuan • Llangamarch/Llangammarch (Llanddewi Abergwesyn) • Llanganten • Llangynog • Llanllwynfel/Llanlleonvel • Llanwrthwl • Llanwrtyd • Llanynys • Maesmynys
Crickhowell	Crucywel/Crickhowell • Llanbedr Ystrad Yw • Llanelli/Llanelly • Llanfihangel Cwmdu (Tretwr/Tretower) • Llangatwg/Llangattock • Llangenau/Llangenny • Llangynidr • Llanisw/Partrishow
Defynnog	Defynnog/Devynnock (Callwen/Colwen • Crai/Cray • Llanilltyd) • Llanfaes • Llansbyddyd/Llanspyddid (Bettws Penpont/Penpont) • Llywel • Penderyn • Ystradgynlais (Coelbren) • Ystradfellte/Ystradvelltey
Merthyr	Aberhonddu/Brecon St John • Aberhonddu/Brecon St Mary • Aberysgir/Aberyscir • Batel/Battle • Garthbrengi/Garthbrengy • Llanddew/Llanthew • Llandeilo'r-Fan/Llandilorfane • Llandyfaelog Fach/Llandefailog-fach (Llanfihangel Fechan/Lower Chapel) • Llanfihangel Nant Bran • Merthyr Cynog (Dyffryn Honddu/Upper Chapel) • Trallwng/Trallong
Penkelly	Cantref (Nantddu) • Llanddeti/Llanthetty (Glyn Collwn) • Llandyfaelog Tre'r-graig • Llanfeugan • Llanfilo/Llanvillo • Llanfrynach/Llanvrynach • Llangasty Tal-y-llyn • Llanhamlach • Llansanffraid/Llansantffraed-juxta-Usk • Llan-y-wern • Talach-ddu • Y Faenor/Vaynor
Talgarth	Aberllynfi^{1} • Bronllys • Cathedin/Cathedine • Crugcadarn/Crickadarn • Gwenddwr • Hay-on-Wye/Y Gelli Gandryll (Hay St John) • Llandyfalle/Llandefalley • Llanellyw/Llanelieu • Llanfihangel Tal-y-llyn • Llan-gors/Llangorse • Llanigon (Capel-y-ffin) • Llys-wen • Talgarth

^{1}chapel to Glasbury parish in Radnorshire

== Sport ==
Brecon Rugby Football Club (Welsh: Clwb Rygbi Aberhonddu) was one of the eleven founding members of the Welsh Rugby Union in 1881. It is a feeder club for the Cardiff Blues. The club plays at Parc De Pugh, Brecon.

Gwernyfed Rugby Football Club is based in Talgarth. It is a feeder club for the Cardiff Blues. Gwernyfed RFC was founded in 1965 by two school teachers from Gwernyfed High School.

The county has four football clubs: Talgath Town FC, Brecon Corinthians AFC, Brecon Northcote FC and Builth Wells FC. All play in the Welsh football league system.

The county has four clubs affiliated to the Welsh Bowling Association: at Brecon, Talgarth, Builth Wells and Hay on-Wye.

Brecon Leisure Centre at Penlan has a swimming pool, gymnasium, ten-pin bowling and a climbing wall. It is the headquarters of Brecon Hockey Club and of Brecon Athletics Club. Crickhowell Community Sports Centre has indoor and outdoor sports facilities and is a conference venue. Builth Wells Sports Centre and Swimming Pool provides facilities in the north of the county. The Gwernyfed and Hay Leisure Centre at Three Cocks has a fitness suite, sports hall and multi-purpose floodlit pitch.

== Coat of arms ==
On establishment in 1889 the Breconshire County Council adopted the attributed arms of Brychan, fifth century founder of Brycheiniog. The shield was quartered. In the first and fourth quarters were the purported arms of Brychan's father Anlach: sable a fess cotised or between two swords in pale argent hilted gold, the upper sword point-upwards, the lower point-downwards. In the second and third quarters were arms representing Brychan's mother, Marchell: or, three reremice (bats) 2 and 1 azure. The motto Undeb Hedd Llywddiant or "Unity, Peace, Prosperity" was used with the arms. The supposed fifth-century arms were invented in the Middle Ages, heraldry having not developed until several centuries later. The county council did not obtain an official grant of armorial bearings, although the unofficial arms subsequently became the basis for those granted to the successor Brecknock Borough Council.

== Notable people ==
- Thomas Coke (b. Brecon 9 September 1747 – d. at sea 2 May 1814) was the first Methodist bishop and is known as the Father of Methodist Missions.
- Richard Booth (b. Hay-on-Wye 12 September 1938), bookseller, known for his contribution to the success of Hay-on-Wye as a centre for second-hand bookselling. He is also the self-proclaimed "King of Hay".
- Gareth Gwenlan (b. Brecon 26 April 1937 - d. Herts 8 May 2016), television producer and director, best known for his work on shows such as The Fall and Rise of Reginald Perrin, To the Manor Born, Only Fools and Horses.
- Roger Glover (b. Brecon 30 November 1945), musician, best known as the bassist for hard rock bands Deep Purple and Rainbow.
- Frances Hogan, nee. Morgan (b. Brecon 20 December 1843 – d. Brighton 5 February 1927) was one of the first women to qualify with a Medical Doctorate (University of Zurich, 1870) and one of the first to be allowed register as doctor in the UK (1877).
- Theophilus Jones (b. Brecon 18 October 1758 - d. 15 January 1812), historian.
- Thomas Price (Carnhuanawc) (b. Pencaerelin, in Llanfihangel Bryn Pabuan, near Builth Wells 2 September 1787 - d. Cwmdu 7 November 1848), historian and literary figure.
- Sarah Siddons (née Kemble) (b. Brecon 5 July 1755 – d. London 8 June 1831), actress, was the best-known tragedienne of the 18th century.

== Places of interest ==
- Brecon Beacons and Brecon Beacons Mountain Centre, Libanus (grid reference SO0428)
- Dan-yr-Ogof Caves, Glyntawe (grid reference SN8316)
- Tretower Castle and Tretower Court (grid reference SO1821)
- Y Gaer, Brecon Roman fort (grid reference SO0029).
- Bishop's Palace, Llanddew, favoured residence of Giraldus Cambrensis (Gerald of Wales)
- Castell Du
- Bronllys Castle
- Crickhowell Castle
- Waterfall Country
- Henrhyd Falls
- Prehistoric scheduled monuments in Brecknockshire
- Roman-to-modern scheduled monuments in Brecknockshire
- Y Gaer

== See also ==
- List of Lord Lieutenants of Breconshire
- Custodes Rotulorum of Breconshire
- List of Sheriffs of Breconshire
- List of MPs for Breconshire
