= Rowland Thomas (bowls) =

British

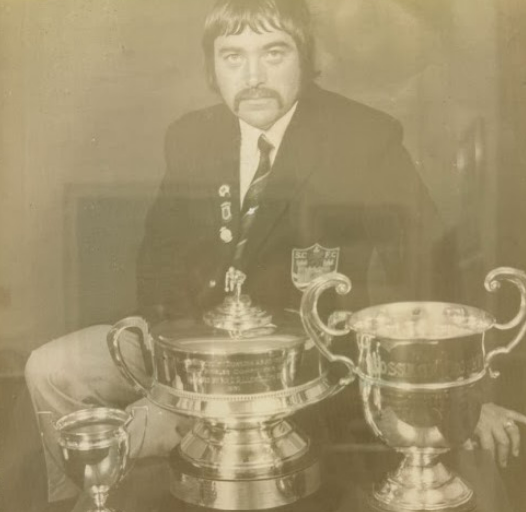
- Rowland Thomas with both Swansea cups and the Stacey Cup

Personal information
- Nickname: Rowley
- National team: Wales
- Born: 7 January 1938 (age 88)
- Spouse: Marjorie Thomas

Sport
- Sport: Lawn Bowls
- Position: Chairman
- Club: Victoria Bowls Club (1968 - 1984); Sketty (Bryn Road) (1984-1998); Victoria Bowls Club (1998-2017); Victoria Saints Bowls Club (2017-present)
Medal record
Representing Wales
Welsh National Championships
Gold medal – first place	1994 Welsh National Championships	Men's pairs

Rowland Madoc Thomas (born 7 January 1938) is a Welsh former international indoor and outdoor bowler. He is currently Secretary for Victoria Saints Bowls Club having first joined the club in the 1960s. He is the husband of the late Marjorie Thomas who was a Welsh Indoor Bowls International, together they had one child.

== Biography ==
Rowley is a Welsh Businessman having run successful Welsh businesses such as Welsh Carpets and Roma Flooring.

He started playing bowls in 1950 aged 12 and was quoted to have immediately fell in love with the game.

In 1967 he joined Victoria Bowls Club, now Victoria Saints Bowls Club after a merger in 2017 with the local St Helens Bowls Club who also played at Victoria Park, Swansea. He left Victoria Bowls Club in 1984 to play private bowls for Sketty at Bryn Road due to a Swansea Bowling Association restriction on players playing internationally, he then re-joined Victoria in 1998.

Rowley went on to win numerous trophies and accolades and in 1972 and 1974 won both Swansea Singles, Glamorgan County singles and Stacey Cup singles in Llandrindod, the first of many. He also won the Welsh Indoor fours & pairs and represented Wales in the British Isles.

Rowley is a 1st generation bowls player for his family where his grandchildren Damian and Sheree and then his great-grandson William all followed in his footsteps by playing for Victoria Saints Bowls Club.

== Rowley Thomas Shield ==
The Rowley Thomas Shield is an association open pairs tournament which has been named after him.
