= Brycheiniog (disambiguation) =

Brycheiniog was a small independent petty kingdom in South Wales in the Early Middle Ages. It can also refer to:

Places

- Fan Brycheiniog, highest peak in the Black Mountain region of the Brecon Beacons National Park in South Wales
- Theatr Brycheiniog theatre in Brecon
- Bannau Brycheiniog, Welsh name for Brecon Beacons, Wales
- Bannau Brycheiniog National Park, alternative name for Brecon Beacons National Park, Wales
- Welsh name for Borough of Brecknock, Wales

People

- Gwynfardd Brycheiniog (fl. c. 1170-80), Welsh poet
- Brychan (or Brychan Brycheiniog), legendary 5th-century king of Brycheiniog

Other

- Brycheiniog (journal), journal founded in 1955 and published by the Brecknock Society and Museum Friends
