= Victoria Saints Bowls Club =

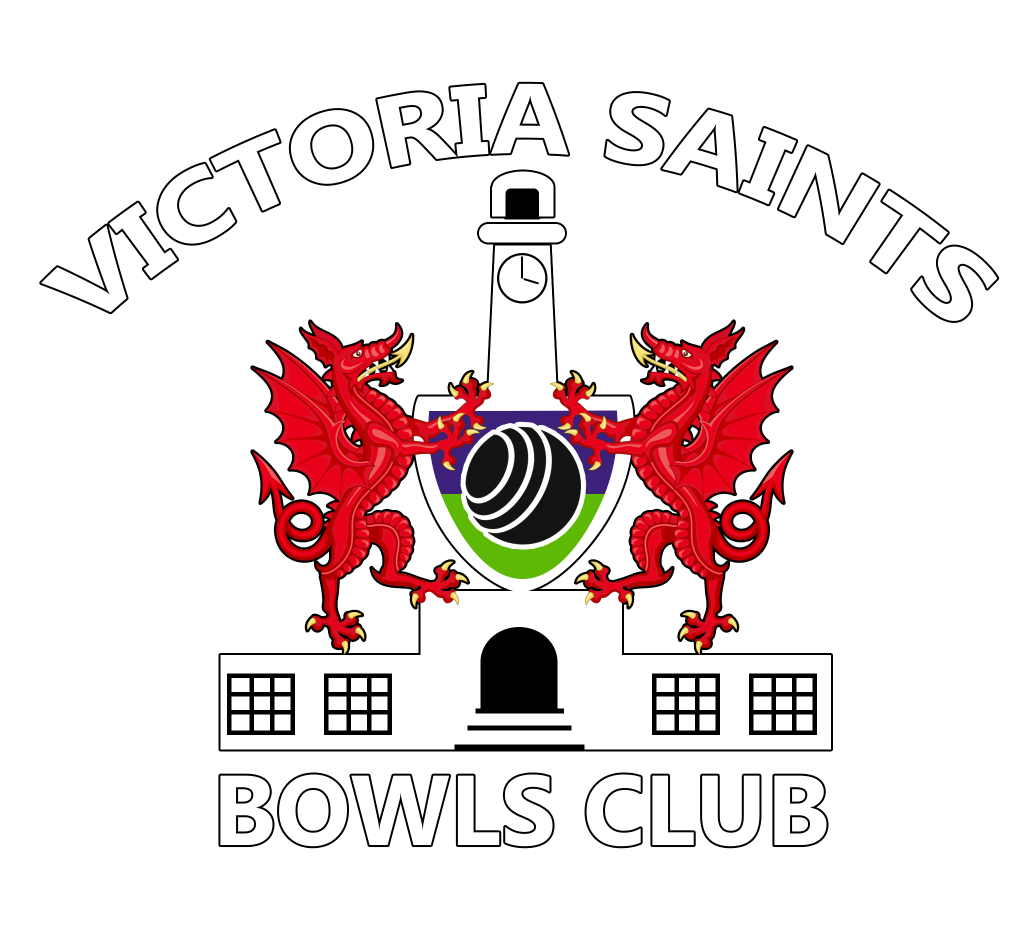
- Nicknames: The Saints, Victoria
- Founded: 1909; 117 years ago
- Ground: Victoria Park
- Chairman: Rowland Thomas
- Secretary: Nicky Thomas
- League: Division 1
- Website: www.victoriabowls.co.uk

Victoria Saints Bowls Club was founded in 1909 was Victoria Bowls Club and in 2017 merged with St Helens Bowls Club to form Victoria Saints Bowls Club. Victoria have played at Victoria Park, Swansea since 1909 and is one of the oldest active bowls clubs in Wales.

The Saints are the only Swansea Bowling Association Club to have won the Welsh Lawn Bowls Club Championship, Carruthers Shield, twice.

They have won the Mond Shield (Division 1 title) 14 times making them the most successful existing club to have won the title.

== History ==
Official records show Victoria Bowls Club was formed on 17 June 1909 with the opening of their Bowls Green at Victoria Park in Swansea by alderman J H Lee he was presented with a silver jack from a collection from the players of the Victoria Team. Victoria started playing games as early as 1908 with local sources citing games against Ammanford, Llanelli, St Gabriels and Dyfatty.

Much of the earlier history of the clubs' earlier years were lost throughout the first and second World Wars as records went missing and lost to history with former players.

=== Joining the Swansea Leagues ===
Victoria joined the South Wales and Mon in 1945 in the third division winning that league and the second in consecutive years and going on to complete the treble by winning the 1st division in 1947 and 1948 this was the start of a golden period for the club in 1952 and 1954 the club enjoyed even higher glory winning the Welsh Lawn Bowls Team Championship called the Carruthers Shield this is the pinnacle of Welsh team bowls and we remain the only Swansea Club to win it on two occasions.

== Trophies & League Victories ==
Victoria plays exclusively in the Swansea Bowling Association and on two occasions won the Welsh Club Championship, the Carruthers Shield becoming the only club in Swansea to have achieved this.

=== National Club Championship (Carruthers Shield) ===
Year	Result
1952	Champions
1954	Champions

=== League Titles (2001-present) ===
Year	League
2001	Division 2
2010	Division 1
2011	Division 1
2012	Division 1
2015	Mid-week League
2021	Keith Jacob Super 9
2023	Keith Jacob Super 9
2025	Division 1

=== Cup Titles (2001-present) ===
Year	Cup
2005	Walter Withey Trophy
2006	Graham Jones Double Fours
2007	Blackiston Cup
2009	Gatwick Shield
2012	Blackiston Cup
2012	Gatwick Shield
2022	Walter Withey Trophy

== Membership & Playing Squad ==
The club maintains a strong membership of players despite on-going fears of the future of Bowls in Swansea. Some members take on additional volunteering roles to help support the running of the club while all members contribute to the maintenance of the green and clubhouse.

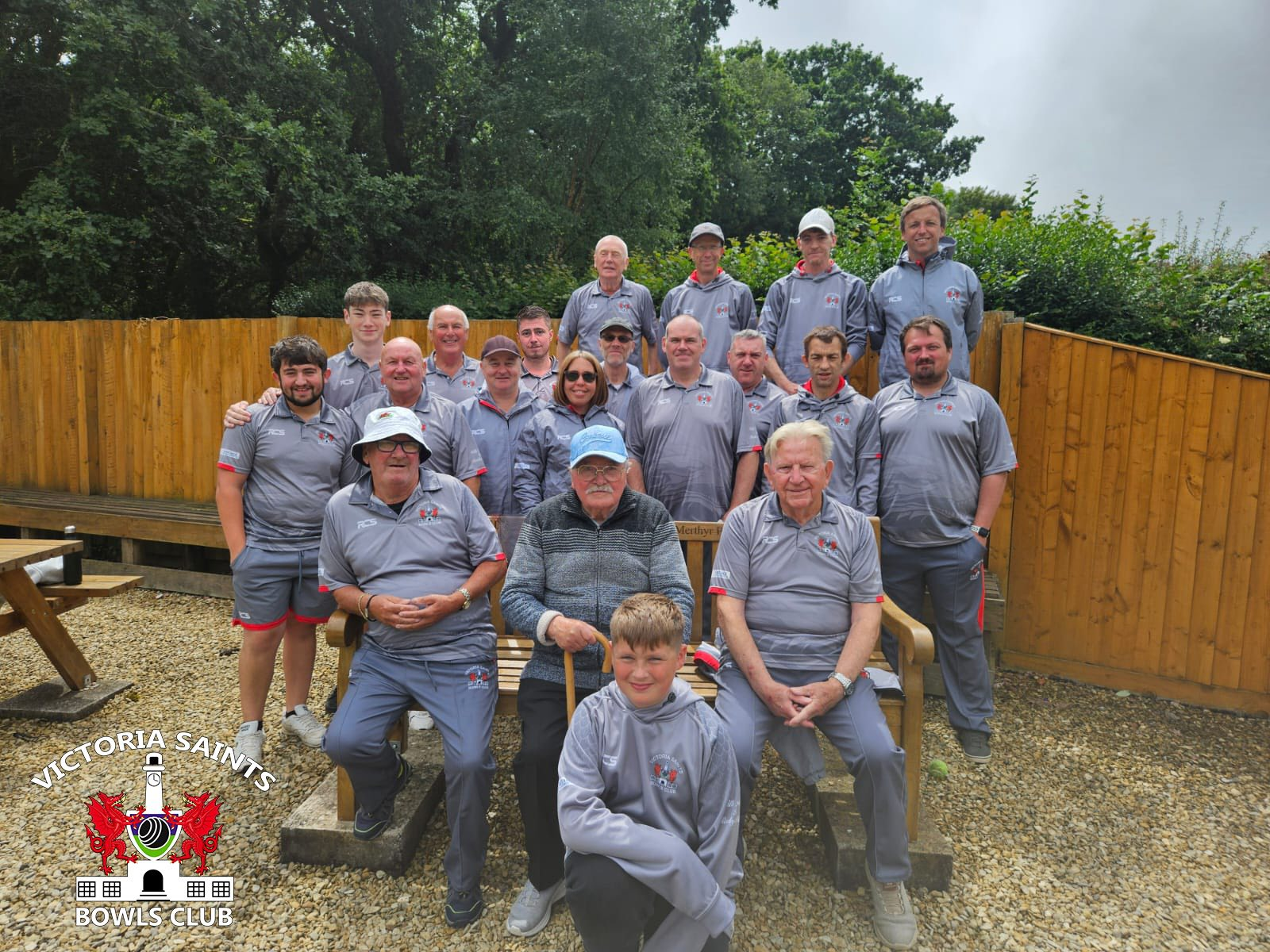
Players of the 2025 Carruthers Shield Final 16

=== Committee ===
Portrait	Name	Role
	Ken Gabriel	President
	Rowland Thomas	Chairman
	Nicky Thomas	Secretary
	Sheree Thomas	Assistant Secretary
	Enda Gormley	Treasurer & Wellbeing Officer

=== Members ===
In addition to the management committee who oversee the operational and running activities of the club, the club is made up of social, casual and full time members.

Name	Additional Roles
Damian Devois	
Steven Devois	
William Thomas	
Adrian Denning	
Allan Jeffery	
Chris Higgins	
John Higgins	Selector
Kai Higgins	
Clive Evans	
Dan Whitehouse	
Dave Thomas	
Hywel Tomos	
Jame Davies	
Kelton Davies	
Mark Dunbar	
Peter Reynolds	
Paul Morris	Selector
Owen Lewis	
Paul Brown	
Phil Curtis	
Rob Carmichael	
Stephen Griffiths	
