= Cefn Llechid =

Hill (400m) in Powys, Wales

Coordinates: 51.9365°N 3.5408°W

Cefn Llechid is a small area of unenclosed land in the Brecon Beacons National Park east of Sennybridge in the county of Powys, Wales. It lies within Fforest Fawr Geopark. Its plateau-like summit surface peaks at 400m where it is marked by a trig point. A couple of small bodies of water lie in a hollow on the plateau. The hill is owned and managed by the Brecon Beacons National Park Authority.

== Geology ==
Like Mynydd Illtud to its east and Fforest Fach to its west, the hill is formed from sandstones and mudstones of the St. Maughans Formation of the Old Red Sandstone laid down during the Devonian period. The sandstones form positive if subdued relief features in the landscape. A number of geological faults run through the area forming a part of the Swansea Fault, itself a part of the Welsh Borderland Fault System.
A legacy of the ice which overran the area during the last ice age is the glacial till which covers the lower flanks of Cefn Llechid.

== Access ==
By virtue of it being registered common land the hill is open access for walkers. Additional access is provided for horseriders and mountain-bikers by a couple of bridleways which link it with the A4215 road to the south and a couple of minor roads to the north.
