= Welsh Crown Green Bowling Association =

Governing body of crown green bowling in Wales

- Sport: crown green bowling
- Abbreviation: WCGBA
- Founded: 1927
- President: Simon Walker
- Chairman: David T Evans
- CEO: Trevor Clarke
- Secretary: Pauline Lindley

Official website
- www.wcgba.com
- (Wales)

The Welsh Crown Green Bowling Association (WCGBA), founded 1927, is the national governing body for crown green bowling in Wales. The WCGBA organise competitions, including the Welsh Club Championship, and select and manage the national side.

== See also ==
- Welsh Bowls Federation
- Welsh Lawn Bowls
- Welsh Indoor Bowls
- Welsh Short Mat Bowls Association
