= Brynmill =

Coordinates: 51.61°N 03.97°W

- Location within Swansea
- OS grid reference: SS635921
- Principal area: Swansea
- Preserved county: West Glamorgan
- Country: Wales
- Sovereign state: United Kingdom
- Post town: SWANSEA
- Postcode district: SA1/SA2
- Dialling code: 01792
- Police: South Wales
- Fire: Mid and West Wales
- Ambulance: Welsh
- UK Parliament: Swansea West
- Senedd Cymru – Welsh Parliament: Swansea West

Brynmill is a suburb of the City and County of Swansea, Wales, UK. It lies about two miles (3 km) to the west of Swansea city centre. It is a residential area forming the southern part of the Uplands electoral ward. As it is close to Swansea University, many students choose to rent rooms here during term time. Aside from the student population, this is a fairly middle-class area.

Brynmill is approximately bounded by Swansea Bay to the south; Brynmill Lane to the west; Glanbrydan Avenue to the north; Bryn-y-Mor Road to the north-east; and Guildhall Road to the south-east. Brynmill can be further subdivided between the upland area of Brynmill proper and the lowland area of St. Helen's close the sea.

Brynmill is situated on hilly terrain. Many of the properties are built on slopes. Property subsidence is a problem here. Property prices here are around the national average. Council tax rates here are quite high. The area offers convenient access to the city centre shopping area via the Oystermouth Road to the South, and Sketty Road to the North. However, these roads are rather congested during peak hours.

== Local amenities ==
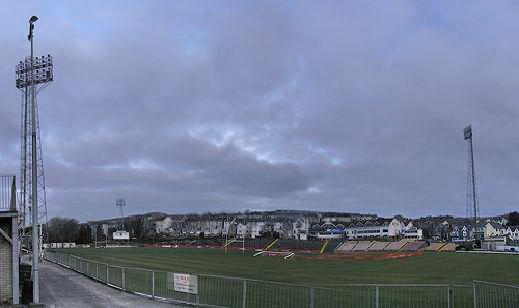
St. Helen's Rugby and Cricket Ground

The parish church of St Gabriel's (Church in Wales/Anglican) was consecrated in 1889. It is situated on Bryn Road. St. Benedict's Roman Catholic Church is on Sketty Road. The local primary schools are Brynmill Primary School and Ysgol Gynradd Gymraeg Bryn-y-mor. The St Helens Rugby and Cricket Ground is located to the South of Brynmill. St. Helen's also plays host to the annual Guy Fawkes Night fireworks display.

To the east of the district is the Swansea Guildhall complex, with its tall clock tower being visible from a distance. The Guildhall houses the City and County of Swansea council offices. The Northern section of the Guildhall complex houses law courts. The Southern part of the Guildhall complex houses the Brangwyn Hall—a venue for social and cultural functions in Swansea. This is a venue for performances of the BBC National Orchestra of Wales when they visit Swansea. This is also used as the venue for graduation ceremonies for new graduates from Swansea University.

=== Waterfront ===
The Swansea waterfront promenade and cycle track crosses Brynmill across its southern boundary. This is just a few metres away from St. Helen's. Situated here is Swansea War Memorial and a memorial to Swansea Jack. The truss structure of the Oystermouth Bridge (a.k.a. Slip Bridge) is now located here. The terminus of the Mumbles land train is situated here.

Immediately south of the promenade lies Swansea Bay. Here is a large sandy beach with fairly calm waters and a very large tidal range. At high tide, the beach is almost entirely covered by Swansea Bay's waters. At low tide, it is about 1/4 mile walk to the water front.

Directly west of St. Helen's is the recreation ground. This is a venue used to host travelling funfairs and circuses. It has hosted the Moscow State Circus, the Chinese State Circus, and Gerry Cottle's Circus. The Rec, as it is referred to by locals, is also host to a seasonal Park and ride car park.

=== Victoria Park ===
To the East of St. Helen's is Victoria Park, containing a bowling green which has been home to Victoria Bowls Club since 1910 and tennis courts. For younger children, there are swings to play on. Victoria Park contains the Patti Pavilion, which serves as a village hall, and is a venue for village fêtes, pantomime, and other theatrical entertainment, as well as music gigs. Located at the South East corner of Victoria Park is a weather station containing a Stevenson screen. The park is designated Grade II on the Cadw/ICOMOS Register of Parks and Gardens of Special Historic Interest in Wales.

=== Brynmill Park ===
Brynmill Park is the local park which is separated from Singleton Park by Brynmill Lane. Brynmill Park is a Victorian park, and contains a lake, which formerly supported a population of whooper swans, but now often hosts a pair of Mute Swans, as well as many other waterfowl. The lake was originally constructed as a reservoir, before being converted to recreational use.

In 2007, restoration work started at Brynmill Park to restore the facility to its Victorian splendour. Work at the park's play area will formed a £1.3 million scheme led by Swansea Council and part-funded by the Heritage Lottery Fund.

Local councillor Peter May and the Friends of Brynmill Park have also been actively involved in the initiative. The project will incorporate the restoration of the existing bowls pavilion and a new discovery centre offering multifunctional educational facilities.

Other aspects of the Brynmill Park project include:

- The installation of two floating nesting islands on the lake to improve habitats for wild birds.
- Various aquatic planting at four areas of the lake, a reedbed and a variety of water lilies and marginal plants at the south-western lake inlet.
- The re-surfacing of paths and the installation of new seats and bins.
- The refurbishment of railings and gates.
- The demolition of the old OAP Pavilion and toilet block and the construction of temporary toilets beside the bowling green.
- The improvement of the large lawned area to the eastern side of the lake by sand slitting and connection to a restored drainage system.
- The repairing of part of the stone wall that forms the lake edge on the north-western side of the park.

Singleton Park houses the Brynmill Stream which was once the town boundary, and which was being used to power a corn mill as far back the fifteenth century. (Swansea before Industry, Swansea Museum Services.)
