= Welsh Bowls Federation =

Governing body of bowls in Wales

The Welsh Bowls Federation (WBF) (established 2001) is an umbrella partnership body comprising representatives from the four national governing bodies: the Welsh Lawn Bowls; the Welsh Indoor Bowls; the Welsh Short Mat Bowls Association; Welsh Crown Green Bowling Association. The two service bodies; The Welsh Bowls Coaching Association and Welsh Bowls Umpires Association are also represented. The WBF has 670 affiliated clubs and over 25,000 members.

The Welsh Bowls Federation is based at Sophia Gardens, Cardiff.
