= Mynydd Illtud =

Plateau in south Wales

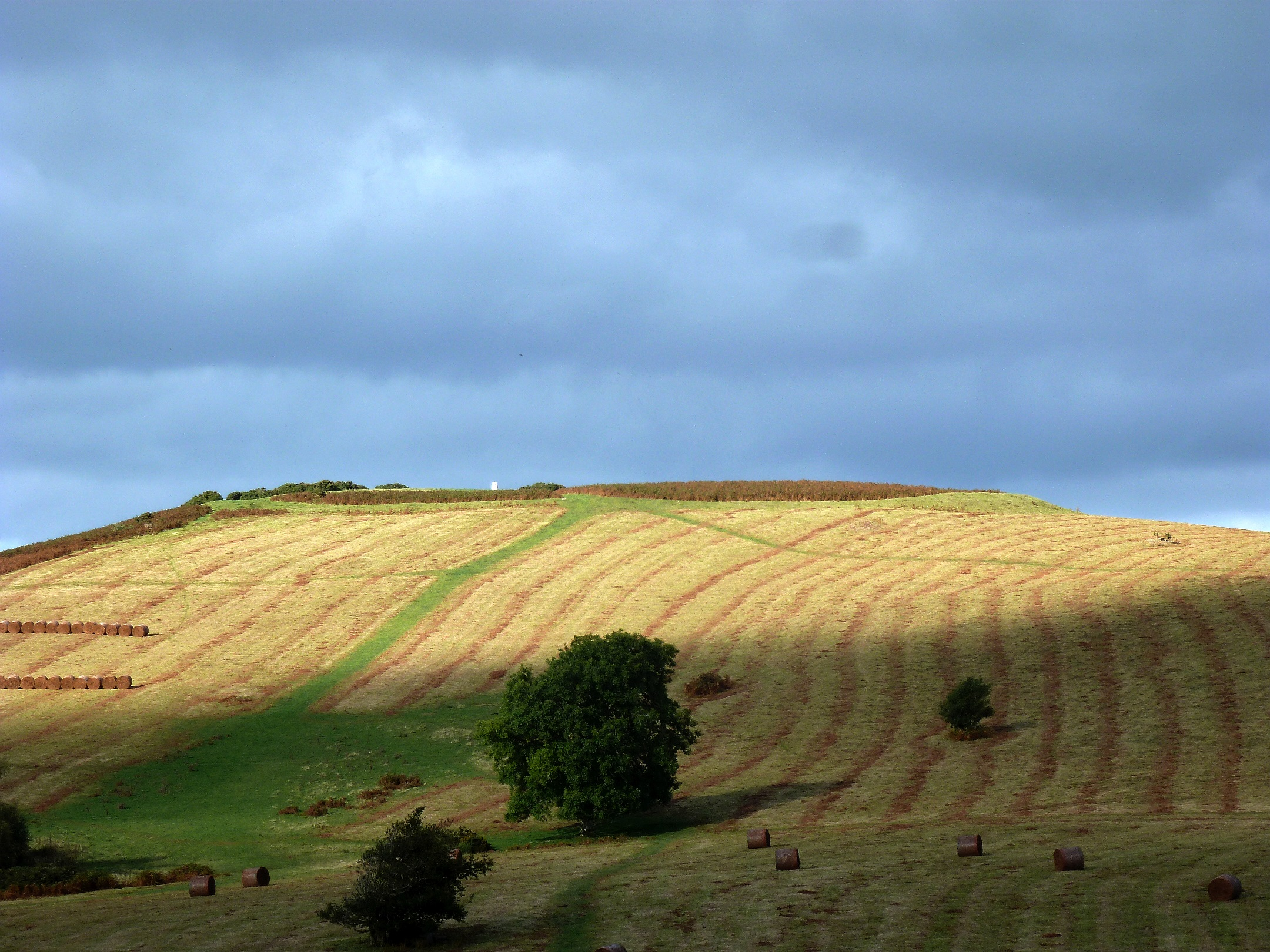
Twyn y Gaer iron age hill fort at Mynydd Illtud, with the trig point visible on top

Mynydd Illtud is an extensive area of common land near Libanus, Powys, Wales, located in the Brecon Beacons National Park and some three miles south-west of Brecon. The common is an undulating plateau lying between 330 and 370 metres (1,080 and 1,210 ft) above sea level. Its highest points are 381 metres (1,250 ft) at Allt Lom and 367 metres (1,204 ft) at Twyn y Gaer trig point overlooking the valley of the River Usk. Twyn y Gaer is the site of an Iron Age hill fort.

== Geology ==
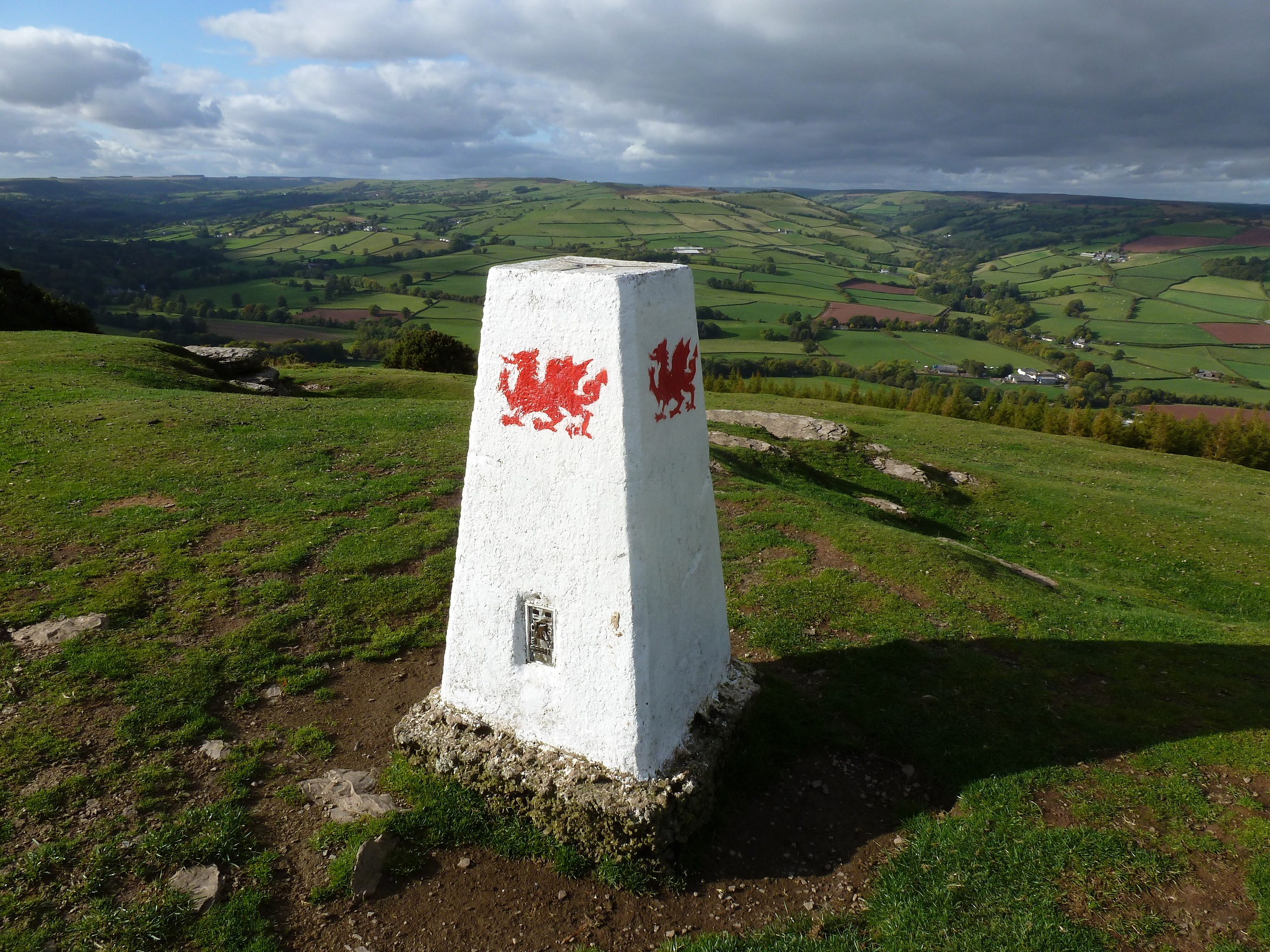
The trig point at the Twyn y Gaer hill fort, Mynydd Illtud

Like Cefn Llechid and Fforest Fach to the west, Mynydd Illtud is formed from the mudstones and sandstones of the St. Maughans Formation of the Old Red Sandstone laid down during the Devonian period. The sandstones have been quarried in places such as at Allt Lom.
The area was overrun by ice during the last ice age and evidence of this is seen in the glacial till which is spread across this undulating plateau and the occasional erratic block of sandstone. Traeth Mawr and Traeth Bach, two rock hollows towards the south-western end of the common are now filled with peat, core sections of which have proved valuable in unravelling the climatic and vegetational history of this area over the last 10,000 years.

== Access ==
Walkers can freely access the entire common as it is open access land, though horseriders and mountain-bikers are restricted to the minor roads, restricted byways and bridleways which criss-cross this area. Other than along the public road network there is no legal right for the public to take motor vehicles (including motorbikes) across the common. Landowners and those with commoners' rights do have certain vehicular rights over Mynydd Illtud. The Brecon Beacons Mountain Centre stands next to Mynydd Illtud on its eastern side and provides advice for visitors wishing to enjoy the area.

== Archaeology ==
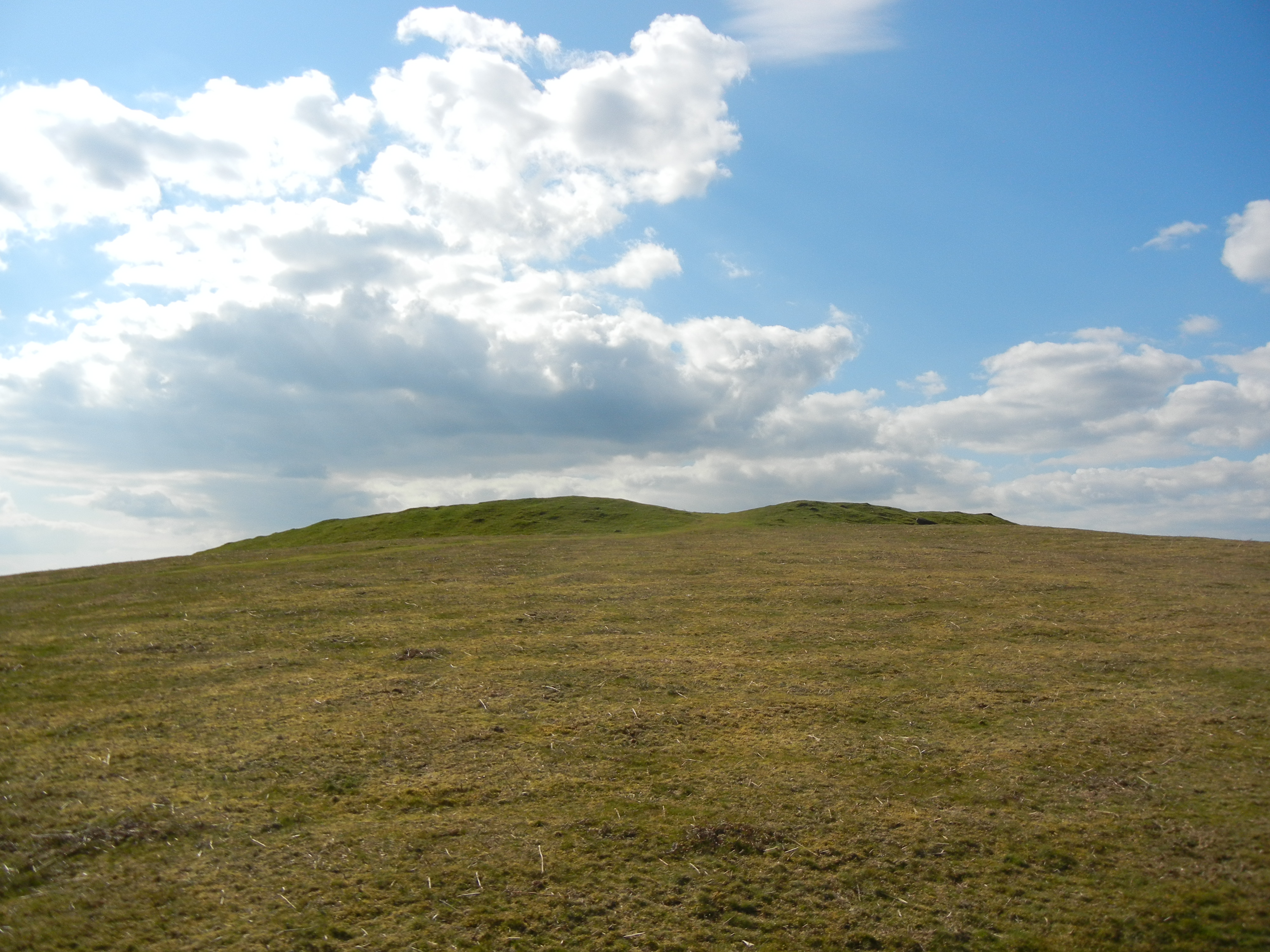
Twyn y Gaer iron age hill fort at Mynydd Illtud (Libanus, Powys), viewed from the east side. The picture also shows the "gate" in the bank and the footpath leading to it.

The Iron Age hillfort of Twyn y Gaer (51.9417°N 3.4708°W) sits atop the grassy mound on the northern tip of the common. In the centre of the hill fort is a trig point. Though little remains of the ancient structure, the location affords good views towards the peaks of Pen-y-Fan and Corn Du as well as to the northern slopes of the Black Mountains and the river Usk. These excellent views of the surrounding area may explain why its naturally defensive spot was chosen for a settlement. Research by A. H. A. Hogg on this hill fort was published in 1982.

The course of a Roman road, Sarn Helen can be traced from south-west to north-east across the common.

Near Twyn y Gaer are a few pillow mounds which date from the 18th and 19th centuries, when rabbits were bred on a large scale for their meat and fur.

Llanilltyd church and associated earthworks (51.9240°N 3.4975°W) are also of interest, as is Bedd Gwyl Illtyd.

== See also ==
- List of hill forts in Wales
