= Brecknock Society and Museum Friends =

Welsh historical society, founded 1928

Brecknock Society and Museum Friends (Welsh: Cymdeithas Brycheiniog a Chyfeillion yr Amgueddfa) is a Welsh historical society that promotes "the study and understanding of the Archaeology, History, Geology, Natural History, the Arts and Literature of Wales, especially the historic county of Brecknock."

The Brecknock Society was founded in 1928. In 1929 they made a successful appeal for the government to purchase Tretower Court, which had become badly neglected. The society handed the museum and its collections to the Breconshire County Council in 1950. In 1986 the Brecknock Society merged with the Friends of Brecknock Museum to form the Brecknock Society and Museum Friends.

The organisation has published the historical journal Brycheiniog since 1955. It also awards the annual Roland Mathias Prize, a literary prize named after author Roland Mathias. In 2007, they successfully petitioned for government funds to restore the Brecknock Museum and Art Gallery.
