= Welsh Short Mat Bowls Association =

Governing body of short mat bowling in Wales

The Welsh Short Mat Bowls Association (Welsh: Cymdeithas Bowlio Mat Byr Cymru) (WSMBA) is the governing body for short mat bowling clubs in Wales. The WSMBA organise national competitions, including league and inter-county, and select and manage the national side.

== See also ==
- Welsh Bowls Federation
- Welsh Lawn Bowls
- Welsh Crown Green Bowling Association
- Welsh Indoor Bowls
