= Rhayader Rural District =

Former local government area in the UK

Coordinates: 52.300°N 3.512°W

Rhayader
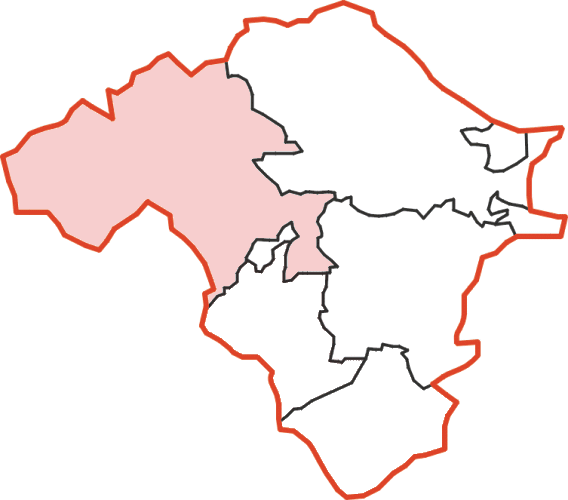
- Area
  - 1911: 91,240 acres (369.2 km^{2})
  - 1931: 91,240 acres (369.2 km^{2})
  - 1961: 91,240 acres (369.2 km^{2})
- Population
  - 1901: 6,049
  - 1931: 4,800
  - 1971: 4,139
- History
  - Origin: Sanitary district
  - Created: 1894
  - Abolished: 1974
  - Succeeded by: Radnorshire
- Status: Rural district
- Government: Rhayader Rural District Council
  - HQ: Rhayader
- Subdivisions
  - Type: Civil parishes

Rhayader was, from 1894 to 1974, a rural district in the administrative county of Radnorshire, Wales.

The district was formed by the Local Government Act 1894, based on the existing Rhayader Rural Sanitary District. The rural sanitary district had included the Brecknockshire parish of Llanwrthwl, and this was administered by Rhayader Rural District Council until 1934, when it was transferred to Builth Rural District.

The rural district comprised nine civil parishes:

- Abbey Cwmhir
- Cefnllys Rural
- Llanbadarnfawr
- Llanfihangel Helygen
- Llansanffraid Cwmdeuddwr
- Llanyre
- Nantmel
- Rhayader
- St Harmon

The district was abolished in 1974 under the Local Government Act 1972, which completely reorganised local administration in England and Wales. Its area became part of the District of Radnor in the new county of Powys.
