= Gwynfardd Brycheiniog =

Welsh-language poet

Gwynfardd Brycheiniog (fl. c. 1170–80) was a Welsh-language poet.

Gwynfardd is noted for his eulogies in praise of Saint David and the Lord Rhys.
