= Libanus, Powys =

Village in Powys, Wales

Coordinates: 51.92016°N 3.4631°W

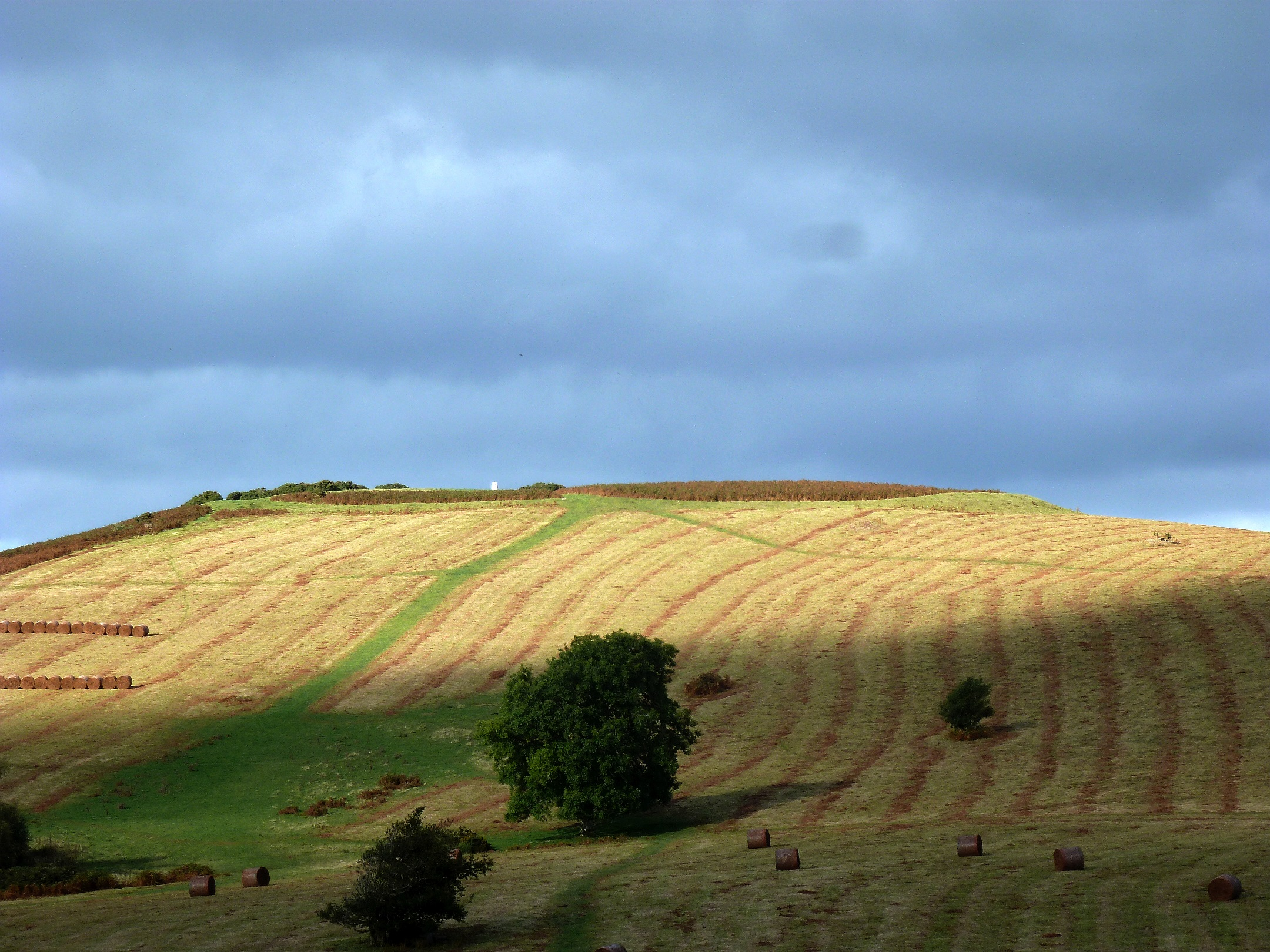
Twyn y Gaer Iron Age hill fort at Mynydd Illtud near Libanus

Libanus is a village in the Brecon Beacons National Park, Powys, Wales, United Kingdom, and in the community of Glyn Tarell. Presumably, the name of the village derives from Mount Lebanon, also known as the Lebanon Mountains, the ancient name for which was Libanus, a common name for chapels in Wales.

It lies on the A470 road approximately 1 mile north-east of its junction with the A4215 road, and approximately 5 miles south-west of Brecon.

The village used to have a primary school (on the right of the edge of the village going west) which was also used as a town hall but it has since been closed down due to lack of government funding and students to attend.

The Welsh language was widely used in Libanus and its surrounds until well into the 20th century.

== Facilities and attractions ==
The village has a pub, the Tai'r Bull.

The National Park Visitor Centre (known locally as "the Mountain Centre", and sometimes as the "Brecon Beacons Mountain Centre" or "Libanus Visitor Centre") is run by the Brecon Beacons National Park Authority. It is consistently the most popular visitor attraction in the National Park.

There is an Iron Age hill fort, Twyn y Gaer, in the Mynydd Illtud area just outside Libanus.
