= Y Gaer (cultural hub) =

County building in Brecon, Wales

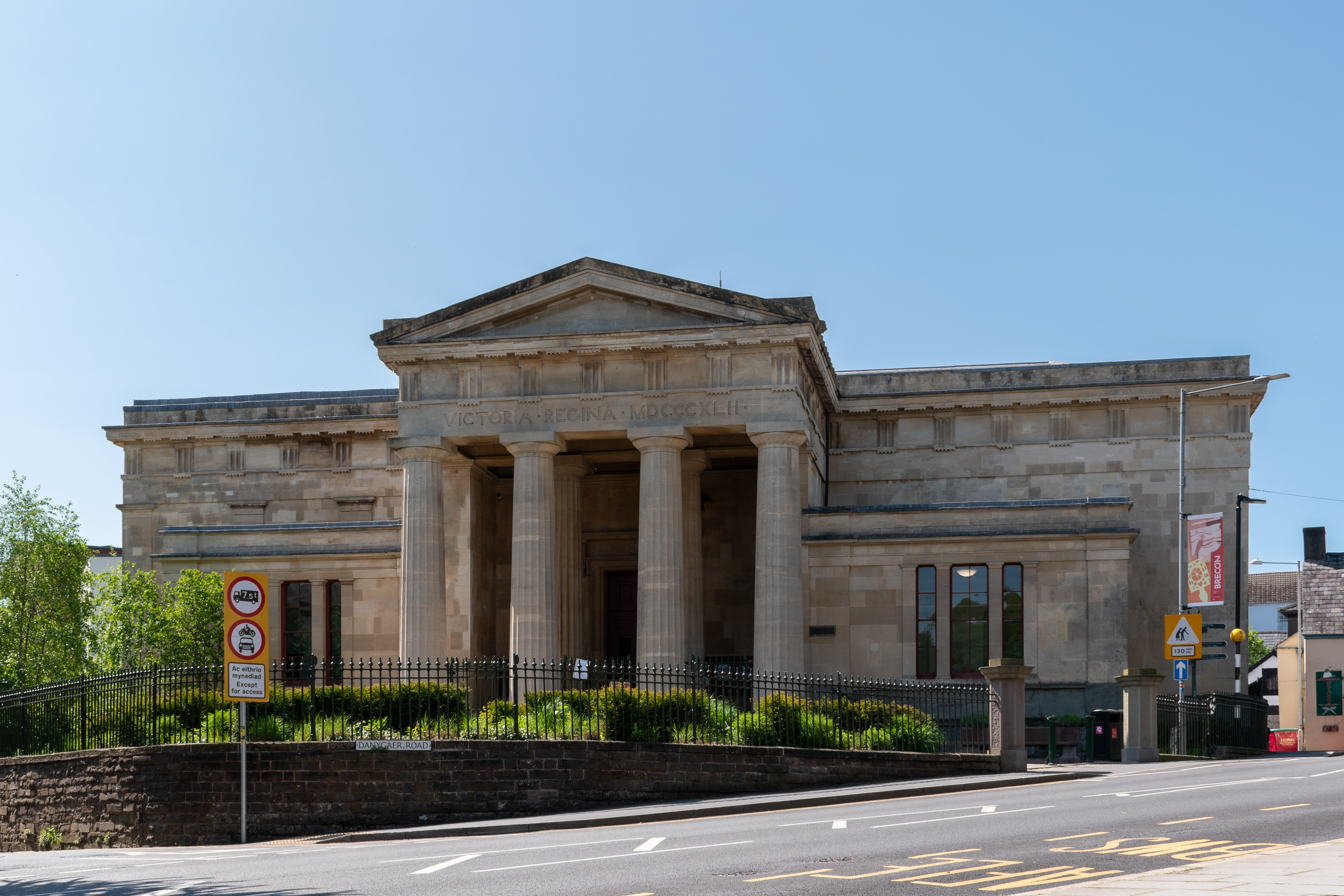
- Y Gaer

- Shown in Powys
- 51.9462°N 3.3895°W
- Location: Glamorgan Street, Brecon

History
- Built: 1843

Site notes
- Architect(s): Thomas Henry Wyatt and David Brandon
- Architectural style: Neoclassical style
- Website: www.ygaerpowys.org.uk

Listed Building – Grade II*
- Official name: Brecknock Museum
- Designated: 16 January 1952
- Reference no.: 7116

Y Gaer (Welsh for 'the fortress') is a municipal structure in Glamorgan Street, Brecon, Powys, Wales. The complex, which includes a museum, an art gallery and a library and incorporates a structure which was once the shire hall for Brecknockshire, is a Grade II* listed building.

== History ==
The original shire hall building was commissioned by the justices as accommodation for the quarter sessions and for the regular assizes. It was designed by Thomas Henry Wyatt and David Brandon in the neoclassical style, built in ashlar stone and was completed in 1843. The design involved a symmetrical main frontage with five bays facing the corner of Bulwark and Danygaer Road; the central section of three bays featured a full height tetrastyle portico with Doric order columns supporting an entablature inscribed with the words "Victoria Regina MDCCCXLII", as well as a frieze with triglyphs and a modillioned pediment. The outer bays contained single-storey blocks with three-light windows. Internally, the principal room was the courtroom.

Following the implementation of the Local Government Act 1888, which established county councils in every county, it became necessary to establish a meeting place for the newly formed Brecknockshire County Council and facilities in the shire hall were identified for this purpose. The shire hall continued to host court hearings until 1971 and to host meetings of the county council until it was abolished in 1974. The county council's main offices were at Watton Mount, a large house directly opposite the shire hall, until 1962 when New County Hall was built immediately behind the shire hall. Following the local government reorganisation in 1974, the New County Hall became an area office for Powys County Council and also served as offices for the Brecon Beacons National Park Authority, but the old shire hall was left vacant.

The Brecknock Museum, which had been established in an old chapel further to the west along Glamorgan Street in 1928, moved into the vacant shire hall in 1974. Highlights of the collection included a tombstone of a young cavalryman called Candidus, found at Y Gaer, a local Roman fort.

After funding had been secured from the Heritage Lottery Fund, a major programme of works to create a new cultural hub for the area was initiated in August 2016. The project involved demolition of the New County Hall and an adjoining Victorian police station and the construction of a modern building on the site, linked to the retained old shire hall. The works, which were carried out by Kier Group at a cost of £14 million, included the refurbishment of the shire hall, the creation of a new art gallery and the construction of a new library building for Brecon Library which relocated from Ship Street. The complex was named Y Gaer to recall the name of the local Roman fort. The works were completed in December 2019.

== See also ==
- Grade II* listed buildings in Powys
