= Alltmawr =

Coordinates: 52.112244°N 3.352844°W

- Location within Powys
- OS grid reference: SO 0746 4685
  - Cardiff: 44 mi (71 km)
  - London: 144 mi (232 km)
- Community: Erwood
- Principal area: Powys
- Country: Wales
- Sovereign state: United Kingdom
- Post town: BUILTH WELLS
- Postcode district: LD2
- Police: Dyfed-Powys
- Fire: Mid and West Wales
- Ambulance: Welsh
- UK Parliament: Brecon, Radnor and Cwm Tawe
- Senedd Cymru – Welsh Parliament: Brecon and Radnorshire

Alltmawr is a village in the community of Erwood, Powys, Wales, which is 44 miles (71 km) and 144 miles (232 km) from London. Until 1986 Alltmawr was a community itself. St Mauritius Church at Alltmawr is counted as being one of the smallest in Wales.

== See also ==
- List of localities in Wales by population
