= Welsh Indoor Bowls =

Governing body of indoor bowling in Wales

The Welsh Indoor Bowls (WIB) is the governing body for the indoor bowling clubs in Wales. It has 24 affiliated clubs. The WBA organise competitions, including the WIBA Club Championship, and select and manage the national side.

The Welsh Indoor Bowls is based at Gorseinon, Swansea.

== See also ==
- Welsh Lawn Bowls
- Welsh Bowls Federation
- Welsh Crown Green Bowling Association
- Welsh Short Mat Bowls Association
