= St Mary's Church, Brecon =

Church in Brecon, Wales

Coordinates: 51.9470°N 3.3906°W

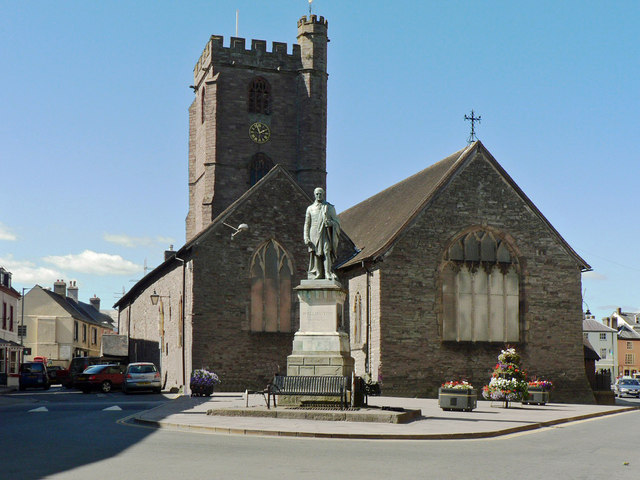
St Mary's Church and statue of the Duke of Wellington.

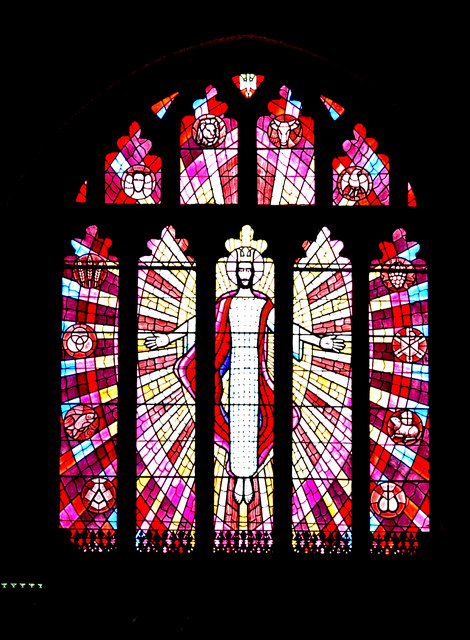
East window

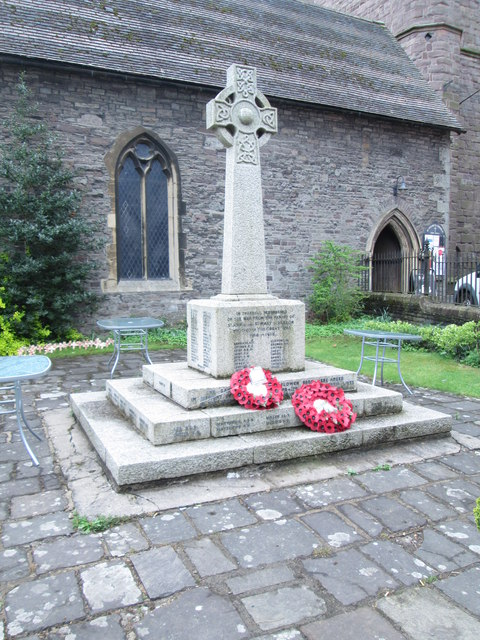
A war memorial on the church grounds.

St Mary's Church is a parish church in Brecon, Powys, Mid Wales. It is a Grade II* listed building in Powys. The structure was originally a chapel of ease for the priory. The 90 feet (27 m) West Tower dates to 1510 and is attributed to Edward, Duke of Buckingham. The eight bells date to 1750, and were taken down for refurbishment in 2007.

== History ==
The Church of St. Mary appears to have been built as early as the latter end of the 12th, or beginning of the following century, but the present structure is not of that early date. The eastern window of the chancel is Gothic of the middle age, and the prevailing style of its architecture indicates that it was not erected till after the year 1015. None of its decorations or pillars date to antiquity. Not a single monument, figure, or inscription is preserved within its walls. The present steeple, which is about 90 feet (27 m) in height, was built in the reign of Henry VIII; it has a peal of eight bells, cast by Rudhalls, of Gloucester, the treble being the gift of a Thomas Lloyd, of Brecknock, though another sources states they were all given by a Mr. Walker, of Newton.

In 1805, the body of the church consisted of two aisles, and on the north-east was the shoemakers' chapel, from which was a door into the vestry, but since the erection of houses close to the windows both these places became so dark that want of room only compelled the inhabitants to occupy the seats in one, but the business usually transacted in the other was transferred to the Town Hall. The principal entrance was under part of the gallery, in which an organ was placed about the year 1794. A reredos was provided for this church, and the Ten Commandments were placed in the chancel.

The Consistory Court for the archdeaconry was held once a month, under the southern door. This part of the building was divided from the other, where divine service was performed, by a slight partition and railing, about the year 1690, to prevent (it was alleged) the country people who attended the court for the appointment of churchwardens from strolling into the church and stealing the prayer books. In 1805, it was repaired and improved, the aisles boarded, and two buzaglos placed there, principally at the expense of the Rev. Richard Davies, who was the archdeacon of Brecknock, and who also erected several new seats in the chancel. No persons were recorded as being buried here, nor does tradition recognise an interment within this church, yet during alterations two stones were removed, evidently sepulchral. In the wall of the north aisle were some marble tablets, upon which are inscribed the Lord's Prayer, the Apostles' Creed, and the Ten Commandments, presented by Mr. Walker, of Newton, and upon the wall of the chancel were two tablets recording all the benefactions to this town, as well as to the parish of St. John's, except Mrs. Rodd's.

In 1857, this church was further restored, and re-opened on 21 October of the same year. The cost of the restoration work was £8,280 5s. Id. The two tables recording the benefactions were popularly believed to have been pulled down and destroyed. It was later discovered that they were only removed from the church to the vestry's walls. The register dates from the year 1685.

An organ was placed in the church in the mid 19th century, purchased with a legacy left for the purpose by the late John Evans, banker, of Wheat street (Wilkins and Co.).

The church also contains a memorial window, the gift of the late Colonel and Mrs. Church Pearce, of Ffrwdgrech, in remembrance of their only son.

== Bibliography ==
- Poole, Edwin (1886). The Illustrated History and Biography of Brecknockshire: From the Earliest Times to the Present Day. Illustrated by Several Engravings and Portraits (Public domain ed.). Edwin Poole.
