= Brycheiniog (journal) =

Academic journal

Brycheiniog is an annual historical and archaeological academic journal published by the Brecknock Society and Museum Friends, covering Brecknockshire (modern Powys; the old kingdom of Brycheiniog) in Wales.

The journal was established in 1955 and has been well received. Museums Journal wrote of the early editions, "The geological history of Brecknock was written for the first volume," and that became the foundation for the historical and archaeological work that followed. A few years later, Glanmor Williams, editor of the Welsh History Review, published an article that praised "the high academic standards of the journal since it first appeared in 1955" and noted it is "lavishly illustrated with photographs, diagrams, and tables."

The journal has been digitized by the Welsh Journals Online project at the National Library of Wales. It has been noted for its usefulness for genealogists, because regular features "include archaeological reports and information on local museums and record offices."
