= Brecon Beacons Mountain Centre =

Visitor centre south of Brecon, Wales

Coordinates: 51.9250°N 3.4886°W

The National Park Visitor Centre, commonly known as the Brecon Beacons Mountain Centre (or shortened to the Mountain Centre, and also known as the Libanus Visitor Centre), is a visitor centre managed by the Brecon Beacons National Park Authority (Bannau Brycheiniog), located in the village of Libanus some 8 km / 5 mi south-west of Brecon in Powys, south Wales. The centre provides information and interpretation for visitors to the area.

== History ==
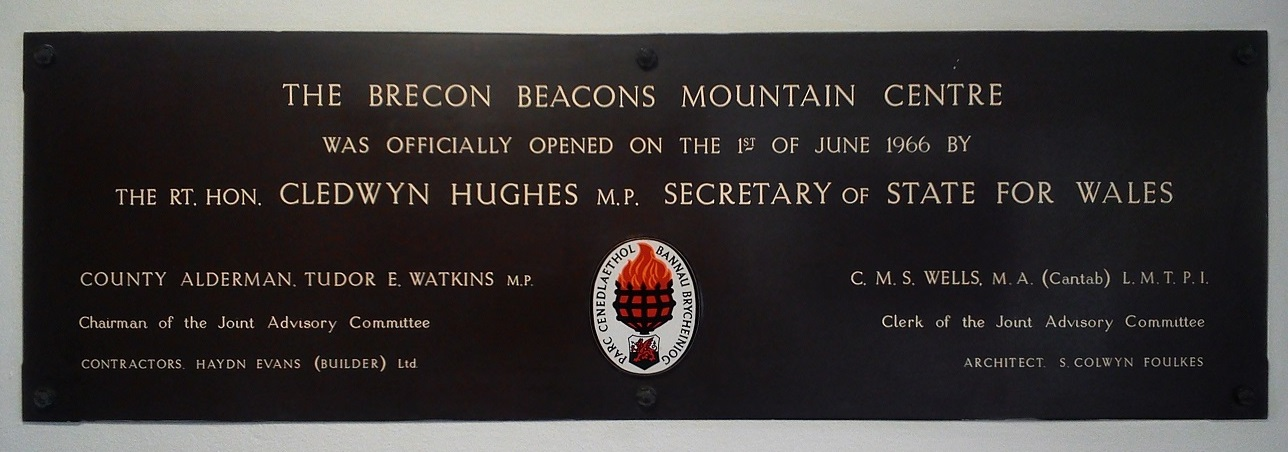
Tablet at the Brecon Beacons Mountain Centre with references to Cledwyn Hughes and Tudor Watkins

The Centre was opened in 1966 and funded by the Carnegie Trust and was overseen by the local council and the Brecon Beacons National Park Authority. Its aim was to provide an information centre for tourists and visitors to the National Park regarding the mountains, the local towns and the countryside and enable them all to better interpret the area. The facility is now wholly owned and managed by the Brecon Beacons National Park Authority.

== Facilities ==
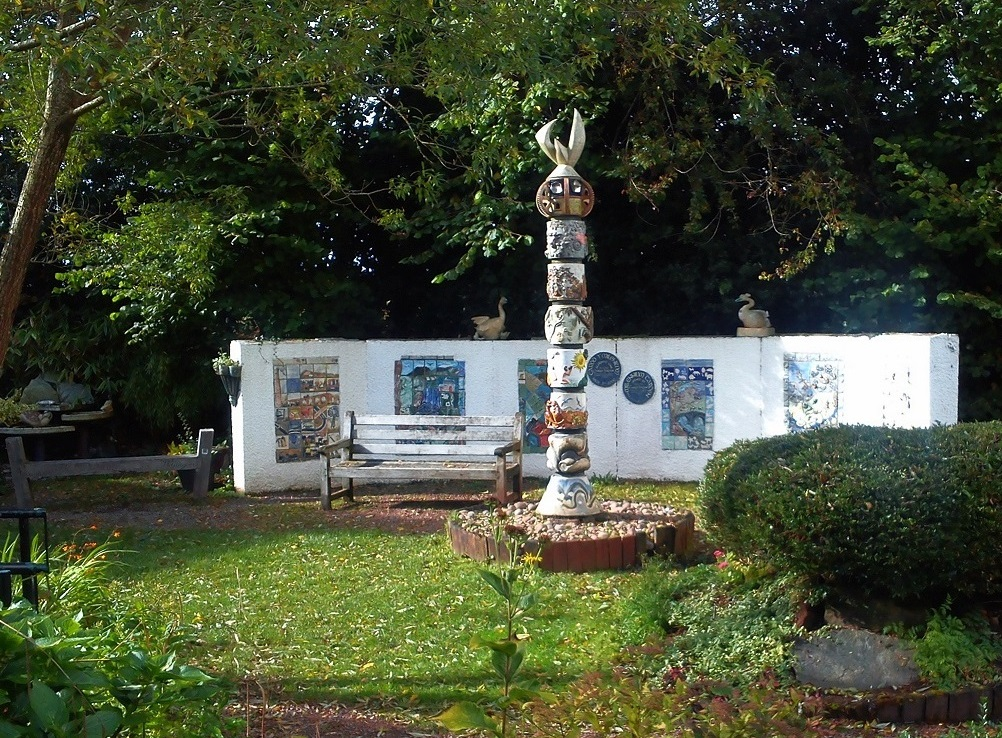
Sculpture garden at the Brecon Beacons Mountain Centre

Admission to the centre itself is free. There is a pay and display car park. A shop sells maps and guides and items of walking equipment. A cafeteria provides food and drinks throughout the year. The Centre hosts a variety of events, including guided walks, some of which explore the common of Mynydd Illtud beside which the Centre is situated. From the grounds and in particular from the terrace there are good views of the two highest peaks in the Brecon Beacons, Pen y Fan and Corn Du.

There is a three-dimensional relief map of the entire National Park and a geological display featuring the various rock types of the area. Short films about the National Park and the Geopark can be viewed in the Centre.

A grassed area in front of the building is available for children to play games and for picnicking.
