= Fforest Fach =

Unenclosed area of Powys, Wales

Coordinates: 51.9289°N 3.5975°W

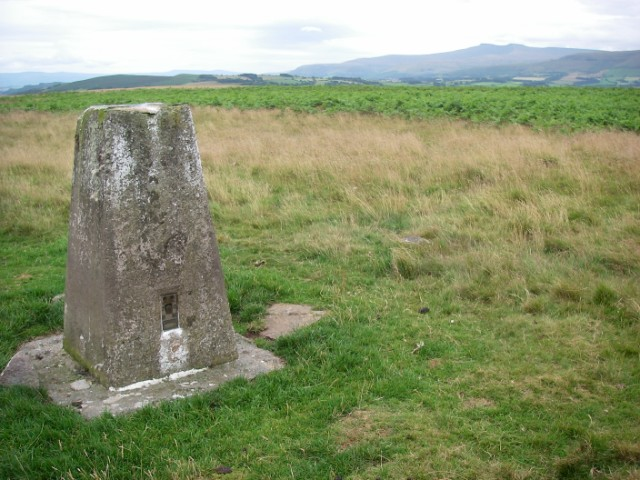
Trig point on Fforest Fach

Fforest Fach is a small area of unenclosed land within Brecon Beacons National Park southwest of Sennybridge in the county of Powys, Wales. Translating from Welsh as 'little forest', it is named in opposition to the much larger area of unenclosed land to the south which is known as Fforest Fawr or the 'great forest'. Whilst Fforest Fawr and Fforest Fach have been distinct areas for many centuries, the odd situation now arises where Fforest Fach now finds itself within Fforest Fawr Geopark, the boundaries of which are drawn rather more widely than those of the traditional royal hunting forest.
The hill possesses two indistinct summits, the higher of which at 382m is in the south whilst that to the north at 381m is crowned by a trig point. There was formerly a rifle range at the north-western corner of the hill.

== Geology ==
Fforest Fach is formed from sandstones and mudstones of the St. Maughans Formation of the Old Red Sandstone laid down during the Devonian period. Some of the sandstone beds on the north-eastern spur of the hill have been quarried in the past for building stone or possibly for use as roof tiles. The now disused Pantymaes Quarry is a major working of the sandstone on the eastern side of the hill which is readily seen from the road.
A legacy of the glaciation of this area during the last ice age is the presence of glacial till around the flanks of the hill. The sides of Cwm Clydach which cuts into the eastern side of the hill show evidence of landslips having occurred, probably in early post-glacial times.

== Access ==
The summit plateau of the hill is open country across which walkers may wander at will. Access is also provided by a couple of bridleways, one of which cuts east–west across the hill between Cwm Treweryn and Cwm Crai.
