= Swansea Jack =

Welsh dog known for rescuing humans

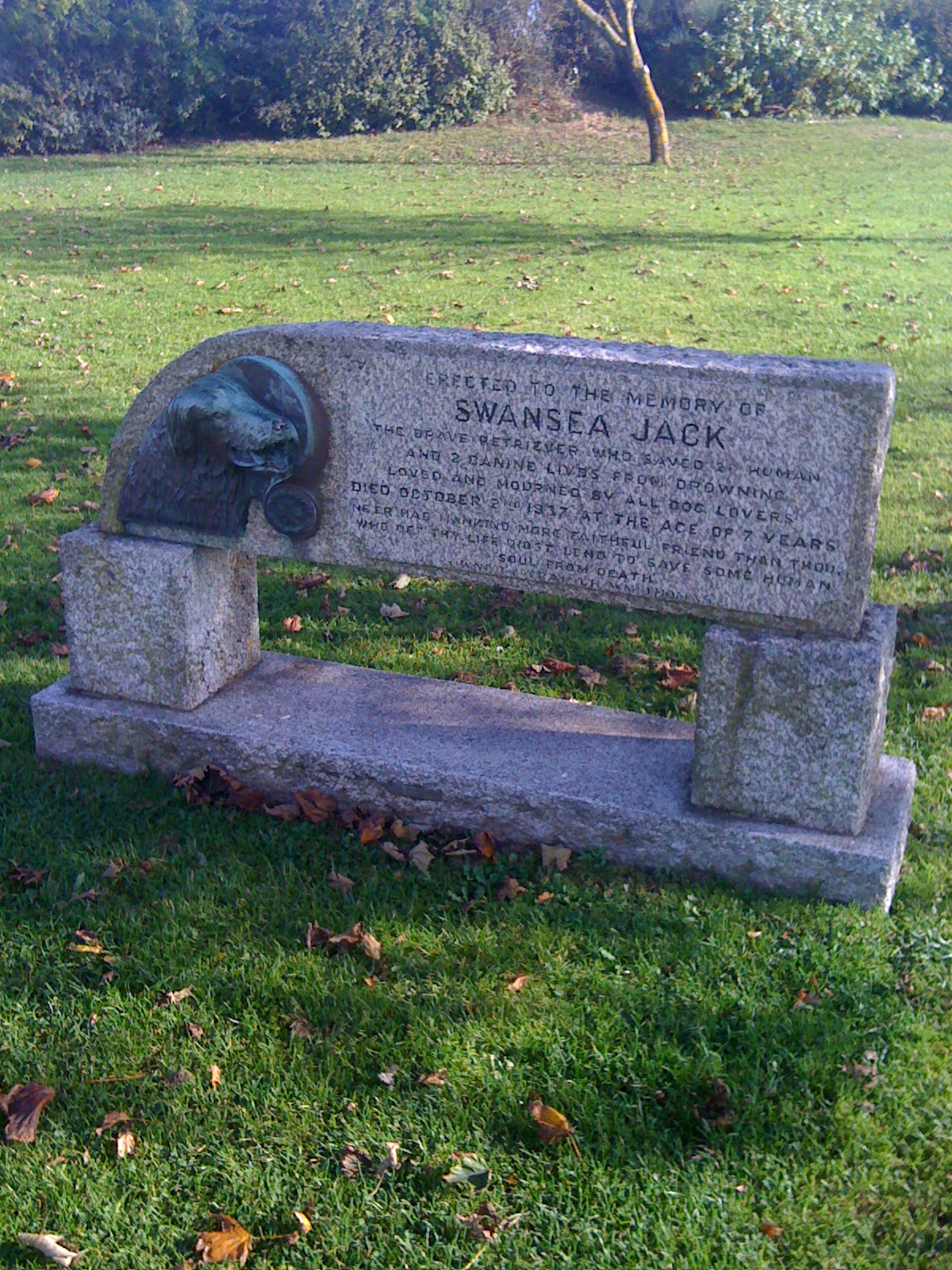
- Swansea Jack memorial
- Species: Canis familiaris
- Breed: Retriever, locally called a "Newfoundland dog"
- Sex: Male
- Born: Jack; 1930; Possibly Newfoundland, Canada
- Died: 2 October 1937 (aged 7); Swansea, Wales, United Kingdom
- Resting place: The Promenade, opposite St Helen's Rugby Ground; 51° 38' 0" North, 3° 58' 0" West
- Nationality: United Kingdom
- Occupation: Lifeguard
- Employer: North Dock
- Years active: 1931–1937
- Known for: Rescuing 29 people
- Title: Named "Dog of the Century" by National Canine Defence League
- Owner: William Thomas
- Appearance: Black retriever-type, longish hair, similar to a Flat-Coated Retriever
- Awards: Lord Mayor of London: Silver Cup; National Canine Defence League: bronze medal (twice); publicly funded burial monument: marble and bronze; more (see text)

Swansea Jack (1930 – October 1937) was a Welsh dog who rescued 29 people from the docks and riverbanks of Swansea, Wales.

He was a black retriever with a longish coat. He was similar in appearance to a modern Flat-Coated Retriever, but was instead identified at the time as a Newfoundland dog, despite being considerably smaller and lighter in build than the typical modern Newfoundland dog, possibly because he was reported to have been born in Newfoundland.

== Life ==
Originally owned by Taulford Davies, he was rehomed by a new owner, William Thomas, where he then lived in the Landore area close to the River Tawe in Swansea. Jack would always respond to cries for help from the water, diving into the water and pulling whoever was in difficulty to safety at the dockside.

His first rescue, in June 1931, when he saved a 12-year-old boy, went unreported. A few weeks later, this time in front of a crowd, Jack rescued a swimmer from the docks. His photograph appeared in the local paper and the local council awarded him a silver collar. In 1936 he had the prestigious 'Bravest Dog of the Year' award bestowed upon him by the Star newspaper in London.

He received a silver cup from the Lord Mayor of London, and he is still the only dog to have been awarded two bronze medals by the National Canine Defence League (now known as Dogs Trust). Legend has it that in his lifetime he saved 27 people from the Docks / River Tawe.

Later in life, Jack moved to Roger Street in Treboeth area of Swansea with his owner, William Thomas.

== Death and legacy ==
Swansea Jack died on 2 October 1937 after eating rat poison; it is not known whether this was accidental or intentional. His death was reported by the press across the UK and the press claimed he had saved 29 lives.

Jack was buried in the garden of his home on Roger Street in Treboeth by a heartbroken William. Jack was later exhumed for a public burial on 21 October 1937.

His burial monument, paid for by public subscription, is located on the Promenade in Swansea near St Helen's Rugby Ground. In 2000, Swansea Jack was named 'Dog of the Century' by NewFound Friends of Bristol, who train domestic dogs in aquatic rescue techniques.

People from Swansea are known as "Swansea Jacks" and have been for centuries, as Swansea was once a thriving port and the term "Jack" was a nickname for people who worked at sea or lived near the docks. A pub near Swansea City's former ground, Vetch Field, was named Swansea Jack in honour of Jack the dog. In 2025 it was announced that the club would be opening a sports bar in the city called "The Swansea Jack". This is more likely to be after the nickname of residents of Swansea rather than the dog

== See also ==
- List of individual dogs

== See also ==
- PDSA Dickin Medal (instituted in 1943) and PDSA Gold Medal (instituted in 2001)
