= Welsh Lawn Bowls =

Governing body of outdoor bowling in Wales

- Sport: Bowls
- Jurisdiction: Wales
- Abbreviation: WLB
- Founded: 2023
- Affiliation: World Bowls
- President: Richard Davies
- Vice president: Helen Rhian Jones
- Secretary: Vacant
- Replaced: Welsh Bowling Association; Welsh Women’s Bowling Association
- (founded): 1904

Official website
- www.welshbowls.co.uk
- Other key staff: Kath Evans Nicky Thomas Huelwen Morgan
- (Wales)

Welsh Lawn Bowls (WLB) is the governing body for outdoor bowls for men and women in Wales. The organisation is responsible for the promotion and development of lawn bowls in Wales, and is affiliated with the world governing body World Bowls. There are eleven affiliated county bowling associations, to which an estimated 370 clubs come under the jurisdiction of the governing body.

== History ==
The Welsh Bowling Association was founded in 1904 but suffered with only 19 affiliated clubs. However following the Coal Industry Commission Act 1919, a Miners' Welfare Fund was set up, which included the provision of recreational facilities for miners and steelworkers. The sport experienced a boom with affiliated bowls clubs rising from 43 to 152. The Welsh National Bowls Championships were inaugurated in 1919 and the Welsh Women's Bowling Association was formed in March 1932.

In 1958 Cardiff hosted the Lawn bowls at the 1958 British Empire and Commonwealth Games.

In 2008, the Welsh Bowling Association was based at Llanishen in Cardiff and comprised 10 affiliated counties and 286 affiliated clubs. The WBA organised competitions, including the county championship, and selected and manages the national side. Also in 2008, the Welsh Women's Bowling Association was based at Knighton, Powys.

Notably, at the 2009 Atlantic Bowls Championships in Johannesburg, the Welsh women's team finished first.

In December 2023, the Welsh Bowling Association and the Welsh Women's Bowling Association merged to become Welsh Lawn Bowls.

== Officers ==
Welsh Lawn Bowls consists of elected and non-elected officers who are responsible for delegated affairs and form sub-committees on decision making.

Name	Role
Richard Davies	President
Helen Rhian Jones	Vice President
Heulwen Morgan	Immediate Past President
Vacant	Secretary
Kath Evans	Treasurer
Huelwen Morgan	Competition Secretary
Vacant	Assistant Secretary
Nicky Thomas	Webmaster

== See also ==
- Welsh Bowls Federation
- Welsh Crown Green Bowling Association
- Welsh Indoor Bowls Association
- Welsh Ladies Indoor Bowling Association
- Welsh Short Mat Bowls Association
