= List of standardised Welsh place-names in Powys =

Location of Powys in Wales.

The list of standardised Welsh place-names, for places in Powys, is a list compiled by the Welsh Language Commissioner to recommend the standardisation of the spelling of Welsh place-names, particularly in the Welsh language and when multiple forms are used, although some place-names in English were also recommended to be matched with the Welsh. The list contains 407 entries, as of November 2023.

The list is based on recommendations provided by the Place-names Standardisation Panel, convened by the Commissioner, for expert advice on the standardisation of Welsh place-names. The panel bases their decisions on a set of guidelines (currently dating to June 2023), specific to Welsh settlement names (such as those of villages, towns, and cities) and topographic features (such as lakes, mountains and rivers). The panel does not cover house or building names, although similar principles could be applied to them or to names for new developments (for which the Commissioner offers their own advice to local authorities and housing developers). The panel may also have used additional guidelines.

The list was first published in 2018, and took years to put together. Upon creation, these lists were published under the Open Government Licence 3.0.

== List ==
Recommended standardised names		Not recommended names		Type	Grid reference
Welsh	English	Welsh	English	Type	Grid reference
Abaty Cwm-hir	Abbey Cwm-hir		Abbeycwmhir	Settlement	SO0571
Aberbechan	Aberbechan			Settlement	SO1393
Aberbrân	Aberbrân			Settlement	SN9829
Abercegyr	Abercegyr		Abercegir	Settlement	SH8001
Aberclydach	Aberclydach		Aber Village	Settlement	SO1021
Aber-craf	Abercrave	Abercraf		Settlement	SN8112
Aberedw	Aberedw			Settlement	SO0747
Abergwesyn	Abergwesyn			Settlement	SN8552
Abergwidol	Abergwidol		Abergwydol	Area	SH7902
Aberhafesb	Aberhafesb		Aberhafesp	Settlement	SO0692
Aberhonddu	Brecon			Settlement	SO0428
Aberhosan	Aberhosan			Settlement	SN8097
Aberllynfi	Three Cocks			Settlement	SO1737
Aber-miwl	Abermule			Settlement	SO1694
Aber-nant	Aber-nant		Abernant	Settlement	SO1797
Aberriw	Berriew			Settlement	SJ1800
Abertridwr	Abertridwr			Settlement	SJ0319
Aberysgir	Aberysgir		Aberyscir	Settlement	SN9929
Adfa	Adfa			Settlement	SJ0501
Allt y Main	Allt y Main		Allt-y-Main	Topographical feature	SJ1615
Alport	Alport			Settlement	SO2795
Ardd-lin	Arddleen	Arddlin		Settlement	SJ2515
Barland	Barland			Settlement	SO2862
Y Batel	Battle			Settlement	SO0030
Belan	Belan			Settlement	SJ2004
Beulah	Beulah			Settlement	SN9251
Bleddfa	Bleddfa			Settlement	SO2068
Bochrwyd	Boughrood			Settlement	SO1339
Bontdolgadfan	Bontdolgadfan		Bont Dolgadfan	Settlement	SH8800
Y Bont-faen	Forge			Settlement	SN7699
Y Bontnewydd-ar-Wy	Newbridge on Wye		Newbridge-on-Wye	Settlement	SO0158
Bronllys	Bronllys			Settlement	SO1435
Bronnydd	Bronnydd			Settlement	SO2145
Bryncynfelyn	Bryncynfelyn			Area	SJ2019
Bryn-mawr	Bryn-mawr			Settlement	SJ2519
Bugeildy	Beguildy			Settlement	SO1979
Burlingjobb	Burlingjobb			Settlement	SO2558
Bwlch	Bwlch			Settlement	SO1521
Bwlchycibau	Bwlchycibau		Bwlch-y-cibau	Settlement	SJ1717
Bwlch-y-ddâr	Bwlch-y-ddâr			Settlement	SJ1622
Bwlch-y-ffridd	Bwlch-y-ffridd			Settlement	SO0695
Bwlchysarnau	Bwlchysarnau			Settlement	SO0274
Caehopkin	Caehopkin			Settlement	SN8212
Caer Beris	Caer Beris			Man-made feature	SO0250
Caer Din	Caer Din			Man-made feature	SO2789
Caer Du	Caer Du			Man-made feature	SO0559
Caer Fawr	Caer Fawr			Man-made feature	SO0553
Cae'r-bont	Cae'r-bont			Settlement	SN8011
Caerhywel	Caerhywel			Settlement	SO2098
Cae'r-lan	Cae'r-lan			Settlement	SN8012
Caersŵs	Caersŵs		Caersws	Settlement	SO0392
Camnant	Camnant			Topographical feature	SO0956
Capel Isaf	Lower Chapel			Settlement	SO0235
Capel Uchaf	Upper Chapel			Settlement	SO0040
Capel-y-ffin	Capel-y-ffin			Settlement	SO2531
Carcwm	Carcwm			Topographical feature	SN8850
Carmel	Carmel			Settlement	SO0566
Carn Ricet	Carn Ricet			Man-made feature	SN8770
Carn y Castell	Carn y Castell			Man-made feature	SO1529
Carn y Geifr	Carn y Geifr			Man-made feature	SN9760
Carnau Cefn-y-ffordd	Carnau Cefn-y-ffordd			Man-made feature	SN9560
Carnedd	Carnedd			Settlement	SO0291
Carnedd Wen	Carnedd Wen			Topographical feature	SH9209
Carno	Carno			Settlement	SN9696
Carreg Wen	Carreg Wen			Man-made feature	SN8288
Casgob	Casgob		Cascob	Settlement	SO2366
Castell Caereinion	Castle Caereinion			Settlement	SJ1605
Castell-paen	Painscastle			Settlement	SO1646
Cathedine	Cathedine			Settlement	SO1425
Cefn Mawr	Cefn Mawr			Topographical feature	SN7915
Cefn-brith	Cefn-brith			Man-made feature	SH9800
Cefn-brith	Cefn-brith			Man-made feature	SN9145
Cefncanol	Cefncanol			Settlement	SJ2331
Cefn-coch	Cefn-coch		Cefn Coch	Settlement	SJ0402
Cefngorwydd	Cefngorwydd			Settlement	SN9045
Cefnllyfnog	Cefnllyfnog			Settlement	SJ1917
Cefnpentre	Cefnpentre			Settlement	SJ1611
Cefn-y-coed	Cefn-y-coed			Area	SO1993
Cegidfa	Guilsfield			Settlement	SJ2212
Cei’r Trallwng	Pool Quay			Settlement	SJ2511
Ceinws	Ceinws			Settlement	SH7605
Cemaes	Cemaes		Cemmaes	Settlement	SH8306
Ceri	Kerry			Settlement	SO1489
Cerist	Cerist			Settlement	SN9688
Cilcewydd	Cilcewydd			Settlement	SJ2204
Cilmeri	Cilmeri			Settlement	SO0051
Y Clas-ar-Wy	Glasbury			Settlement	SO1838
Cleirwy	Clyro			Settlement	SO2143
Cloddiau	Cloddiau			Settlement	SJ2009
Cnwclas	Knucklas			Settlement	SO2574
Coedway	Coedway			Settlement	SJ3414
Coedybrenin	Kingswood				SJ2402
Coelbren	Coelbren			Settlement	SN8511
Coldbrook	Coldbrook			Settlement	SO1536
Colfa	Colfa			Settlement	SO2053
Comins-coch	Comins-coch		Commins Coch	Settlement	SH8403
Cradoc	Cradoc			Settlement	SO0130
Crai	Crai			Settlement	SN8924
Cregrina	Cregrina			Settlement	SO1252
Crew Green	Crew Green			Settlement	SJ3215
Cross Oak	Cross Oak			Settlement	SO1023
Crowther's Pool	Crowther's Pool			Settlement	SO2148
Crucadarn	Crickadarn			Settlement	SO0842
Crucywel	Crickhowell			Settlement	SO2118
Crugion	Criggion			Settlement	SJ2915
Cwm Belan	Cwm Belan			Settlement	SN9481
Cwm-bach	Cwm-bach			Settlement	SO1639
Cwmcrawnon	Cwmcrawnon			Settlement	SO1419
Cwmgïedd	Cwmgïedd		Cwmgiedd	Settlement	SN7811
Cwmheiob	Cwmheyope			Settlement	SO2174
Cwmlline	Cwmlline			Settlement	SH8407
Cwm-rhos	Cwm-rhos			Settlement	SO1824
Cwm-twrch Isaf	Lower Cwm-twrch		Lower Cwmtwrch	Settlement	SN7610
Cwm-twrch Uchaf	Upper Cwm-twrch		Upper Cwmtwrch	Settlement	SN7511
Cwmwysg	Cwmwysg			Settlement	SN8528
Cwrtygollen	Cwrtygollen		Cwrt-y-Gollen	Area	SO2317
Dardy	Dardy			Settlement	SO2018
Darowen	Darowen			Settlement	SH8201
Defynnog	Defynnog			Settlement	SN9227
Derwen-las	Derwen-las		Derwenlas	Settlement	SN7299
Diserth	Diserth			Settlement	SO0358
Dolanog	Dolanog			Settlement	SJ0612
Dolau	Dolau			Settlement	SO1467
Doldowlod	Doldowlod			Settlement	SN9763
Dolfor	Dolfor			Settlement	SO1087
Dolgadfan	Dolgadfan			Area	SH8800
Dolley Green	Dolley Green			Settlement	SO2865
Dolycannau	Dolycannau			Settlement	SO2049
Dolyronnen	Dolyronnen			Settlement	SH8300
Domgae	Domgae			Settlement	SJ2819
Y Drenewydd	Newtown			Settlement	SO1091
Dutlas	Dutlas			Settlement	SO2177
Dylife	Dylife			Settlement	SN8694
Efail-rhyd	Efail-rhyd			Settlement	SJ1626
Einsiob	Evenjobb			Settlement	SO2662
Erwyd	Erwood			Settlement	SO0942
Esgair Maen	Esgair Maen			Topographical feature	SN9978
Esgairgeiliog	Esgairgeiliog			Settlement	SH7506
Y Fan	Y Fan		Van	Settlement	SN9487
Felin Crai	Felin Crai			Settlement	SN8823
Felindre	Felindre			Settlement	SJ1601
Felin-fach	Felin-fach			Settlement	SO0933
Felin-newydd	New Mills			Settlement	SJ0901
Ffawyddog	Ffawyddog			Settlement	SO2018
Ffordd-las	Ffordd-las			Settlement	SO2038
Ffordun	Forden			Settlement	SJ2200
Ffynnongynid	Ffynnongynid			Settlement	SO1641
Frochas	Frochas			Settlement	SJ2910
Garthbeibio	Garthbeibio			Settlement	SH9812
Garthbrengi	Garthbrengi			Settlement	SO0433
Garthmyl	Garthmyl			Settlement	SO1999
Y Gelli Gandryll	Hay-on-Wye			Settlement	SO2242
Geuffordd	Geuffordd			Settlement	SJ2114
Geufron	Geufron			Settlement	SN9968
Glangrwyne	Glangrwyne		Glangrwyney	Settlement	SO2416
Glan-miwl	Glan-mule		Glanmule	Settlement	SO1690
Glan-rhyd	Glan-rhyd			Settlement	SN7709
Glantwymyn	Cemaes Road		Cemmaes Road	Settlement	SH8204
Glan-y-nant	Glan-y-nant			Settlement	SN9384
Glasbwll	Glasbwll			Settlement	SN7397
Glasgwm	Glasgwm			Settlement	SO1553
Gleiniant	Gleiniant			Settlement	SN9791
Glyntawe	Glyntawe			Settlement	SN8416
Y Groes	Crossgates			Settlement	SO0864
Groesffordd	Groesffordd			Settlement	SO0728
Groes-lwyd	Groes-lwyd			Settlement	SJ2111
Groespluen	Groespluen			Settlement	SJ2108
Gurnos	Gurnos			Settlement	SN7709
Gwaeddel	Weythel			Settlement	SO2357
Gwenddwr	Gwenddwr			Settlement	SO0643
Gwestydd	Gwestydd			Settlement	SO1193
Gwystre	Gwystre			Settlement	SO0665
Hawy	Howey			Settlement	SO0558
Heartsease	Heartsease			Settlement	SO1369
Hen Domen	Hen Domen			Man-made feature	SO2198
Hen Ystog	Old Churchstoke		Old Church Stoke	Settlement	SO2894
Hengoed	Hengoed			Settlement	SO2253
Henllan	Henllan			Settlement	SJ1308
Heolsenni	Heolsenni		Heol Senni	Settlement	SN9223
Hirnant	Hirnant			Settlement	SJ0522
Yr Hôb	Hope			Settlement	SJ2507
Hundred House	Hundred House			Settlement	SO1154
Hwytyn	Whitton			Settlement	SO2767
Isatyn	Hyssington			Settlement	SO3194
Is-y-coed	Is-y-coed			Area	SH7700
Kinnerton	Kinnerton			Settlement	SO2463
Libanus	Libanus			Settlement	SN9925
Llaethdy	Llaethdy			Settlement	SO0680
Llanafan-fawr	Llanafan-fawr		Llanafan Fawr	Settlement	SN9655
Llanandras	Presteigne			Settlement	SO3164
Llananno	Llananno			Settlement	SO0974
Llanarmon Mynydd Mawr	Llanarmon Mynydd Mawr			Settlement	SJ1327
Llanbadarn Fynydd	Llanbadarn Fynydd			Settlement	SO0978
Llanbadarn-y-garreg	Llanbadarn-y-garreg		Llanbadarn y Garreg	Settlement	SO1148
Llanbedr	Llanbedr			Settlement	SO1446
Llanbedr Ystrad Yw	Llanbedr Ystrad Yw			Settlement	SO2320
Llanbister	Llanbister			Settlement	SO1073
Llanbrynmair	Llanbrynmair			Settlement	SH8902
Llancowrid	Llancowrid			Settlement	SO1990
Llan-ddew	Llan-ddew		Llanddew	Settlement	SO0530
Llanddewi Ystradenni	Llanddewi Ystradenni		Llanddewi Ystradenny	Settlement	SO1068
Llanddewi’r-cwm	Llanddewi’r-cwm			Settlement	SO0348
Llandeglau	Llandegley			Settlement	SO1362
Llandeilo Graban	Llandeilo Graban			Settlement	SO0944
Llandeilo'r-fân	Llandeilo'r-fân		Llandeilo'r-Fan	Settlement	SN8934
Llandinam	Llandinam			Settlement	SO0288
Llandrindod	Llandrindod Wells			Settlement	SO0561
Llandrinio	Llandrinio			Settlement	SJ2817
Llandyfaelog Fach	Llandyfaelog Fach			Settlement	SO0332
Llandyfaelog Tre'r-graig	Llandyfaelog Tre'r-graig			Settlement	SO1229
Llandyfalle	Llandyfalle		Llandefalle	Settlement	SO1035
Llandysilio	Four Crosses			Settlement	SJ2619
Llandysul	Llandysul		Llandyssil	Settlement	SO1995
Llaneglwys	Llaneglwys			Settlement	SO0638
Llanelwedd	Llanelwedd			Settlement	SO0451
Llanerfyl	Llanerfyl			Settlement	SJ0309
Llan-faes	Llan-faes			Settlement	SO0328
Llanfair Caereinion	Llanfair Caereinion			Settlement	SJ1006
Llanfair Llythynwg	Gladestry			Settlement	SO2355
Llanfair-ym-Muallt	Builth Wells			Settlement	SO0350
Llanfaredd	Llanfaredd			Settlement	SO0650
Llanfechain	Llanfechain			Settlement	SJ1820
Llanfellte	Llanfellte			Settlement	SO1421
Llanfihangel Cwm Du	Llanfihangel Cwm Du	Cwm-du	Cwmdu	Settlement	SO1823
Llanfihangel Dyffryn Arwy	Michaelchurch-on-Arrow			Settlement	SO2450
Llanfihangel Helygen	Llanfihangel Helygen			Settlement	SO0464
Llanfihangel Nant Brân	Llanfihangel Nant Brân			Settlement	SN9434
Llanfihangel Nant Melan	Llanfihangel Nant Melan			Settlement	SO1858
Llanfihangel Rhydieithon	Llanfihangel Rhydieithon			Settlement	SO1566
Llanfihangel Tal-y-llyn	Llanfihangel Tal-y-llyn		Llanfihangel Talyllyn	Settlement	SO1128
Llanfihangel-yng-Ngwynfa	Llanfihangel-yng-Ngwynfa			Settlement	SJ0816
Llanfilo	Llanfilo			Settlement	SO1133
Llanfrynach	Llanfrynach			Settlement	SO0725
Llanfyllin	Llanfyllin			Settlement	SJ1419
Llangadfan	Llangadfan			Settlement	SJ0110
Llangamarch	Llangamarch Wells		Llangammarch Wells	Settlement	SN9347
Llangasty Tal-y-llyn	Llangasty Tal-y-llyn			Settlement	SO1326
Llangatwg	Llangattock			Settlement	SO2117
Llangedwyn	Llangedwyn			Settlement	SJ1824
Llangenni	Llangenni		Llangenny	Settlement	SO2417
Llan-gors	Llan-gors		Llangors Llangorse	Settlement	SO1327
Llangurig	Llangurig			Settlement	SN9079
Llangynidr	Llangynidr			Settlement	SO1519
Llangynllo	Llangynllo		Llangunllo	Settlement	SO2171
Llangynog	Llangynog			Settlement	SJ0526
Llangynyw	Llangynyw			Settlement	SJ1208
Llanhamlach	Llanhamlach			Settlement	SO0926
Llanidloes	Llanidloes			Settlement	SN9584
Llanigon	Llanigon			Settlement	SO2140
Llaniwared	Llaniwared			Area	SN8877
Llanllugan	Llanllugan			Settlement	SJ0502
Llanllwchaearn	Llanllwchaearn		Llanllwchaiarn	Settlement	SO1192
Llanllŷr	Llanyre			Settlement	SO0462
Llanmerewig	Llanmerewig			Settlement	SO1592
Llannerch Emrys	Llannerch Emrys			Settlement	SJ2023
Llannewydd	Newchurch			Settlement	SO2150
Llanrhaeadr-ym-Mochnant	Llanrhaeadr-ym-Mochnant			Settlement	SJ1226
Llansanffraid	Llansanffraid		Llansantffraed	Settlement	SO1223
Llansanffraid Cwmteuddwr	Llansanffraid Cwmteuddwr			Settlement	SN9667
Llansanffraid-ym-Mechain	Llansanffraid-ym-Mechain		Llansantffraid-ym-Mechain	Settlement	SJ2120
Llansbyddid	Llansbyddid		Llanspyddid	Settlement	SO0128
Llansilin	Llansilin			Settlement	SJ2028
Llansteffan	Llansteffan		Llanstephan	Settlement	SO1242
Llanwddyn	Llanwddyn			Settlement	SJ0219
Llanwnnog	Llanwnnog			Settlement	SO0293
Llanwrin	Llanwrin			Settlement	SH7803
Llanwrthwl	Llanwrthwl			Settlement	SN9763
Llanwrtyd	Llanwrtyd Wells			Settlement	SN8746
Llanwyddelan	Llanwyddelan			Settlement	SJ0701
Llanymynech	Llanymynech			Settlement	SJ2620
Llan-y-wern	Llan-y-wern			Settlement	SO1028
Llawr-y-glyn	Llawr-y-glyn		Llawryglyn	Settlement	SN9391
Lledrod	Lledrod			Man-made feature	SJ2229
Llowes	Llowes			Settlement	SO1941
Llwynderw	Llwynderw			Settlement	SJ2003
Llwyn-gwern	Llwyn-gwern			Topographical feature	SH7504
Llwyni	Lloyney			Settlement	SO2475
Llwyn-y-gog	Llwyn-y-gog			Settlement	SN8792
Llys-wen	Llys-wen		Llyswen	Settlement	SO1337
Llywel	Llywel			Settlement	SN8730
Machynlleth	Machynlleth			Settlement	SH7400
Maelienydd	Maelienydd			Area	SO1371
Maes-mawr	Maes-mawr		Maesmawr	Area	SO0391
Maesmynys	Maesmynys			Settlement	SO0147
Maesyfed	New Radnor			Settlement	SO2160
Maesyronnen	Maesyronnen			Man-made feature	SO1740
Manafon	Manafon			Settlement	SJ1102
Meifod	Meifod			Settlement	SJ1513
Melinbyrhedyn	Melinbyrhedyn			Settlement	SN8198
Melltyn	Mellington			Settlement	SO2693
Merthyr Cynog	Merthyr Cynog			Settlement	SN9837
Mochdre	Mochdre			Settlement	SO0788
Moel Ddolwen	Moel Ddolwen			Man-made feature	SH9807
Moelfre	Moelfre			Settlement	SJ1828
Nant-ddu	Nant-ddu			Settlement	SO0014
Nant-glas	Nant-glas		Nant Glas	Settlement	SN9965
Nantmel	Nantmel			Settlement	SO0366
Norton	Norton			Settlement	SO3067
Pandy Rhiwsaeson	Pandy Rhiwsaeson			Settlement	SH9004
Pant-glas	Pant-glas			Settlement	SJ1813
Pant-mawr	Pant-mawr			Settlement	SN8482
Pant-y-dŵr	Pant-y-dŵr			Settlement	SN9874
Pant-y-ffridd	Pant-y-ffridd			Settlement	SJ1502
Patrisio	Partrishow			Settlement	SO2722
Pedair-ffordd	Pedair-ffordd			Settlement	SJ1124
Pencelli	Pencelli			Settlement	SO0925
Pencraig	Old Radnor			Settlement	SO2559
Penegoes	Penegoes			Settlement	SH7700
Penffordd-las	Staylittle			Settlement	SN8892
Pengenffordd	Pengenffordd			Settlement	SO1730
Pennant	Pennant			Settlement	SN8797
Pennant Melangell	Pennant Melangell			Area	SJ0226
Pennorth	Pennorth			Settlement	SO1126
Pen-pont	Pen-pont			Settlement	SN9728
Pen-rhos	Pen-rhos			Settlement	SN8011
Pentre Elan	Elan Village			Settlement	SN9365
Pentre Llifior	Pentre Llifior			Settlement	SO1497
Pentre Llwyn-llwyd	Pentre Llwyn-llwyd			Settlement	SN9654
Pentre’r-beirdd	Pentre’r-beirdd			Settlement	SJ1813
Pentre-bach	Pentre-bach			Settlement	SN8233
Pentrefelin	Pentrefelin			Settlement	SJ1524
Pentre'r-felin	Pentre'r-felin			Settlement	SN9130
Pentyrch	Pentyrch			Area	SJ0608
Pen-wyllt	Pen-wyllt		Penwyllt	Settlement	SN8515
Pen-y-bont	Pen-y-bont		Penybont	Settlement	SO1164
Pen-y-bont Llannerch Emrys	Pen-y-bont Llannerch Emrys			Settlement	SJ2123
Pen-y-bont-fawr	Pen-y-bont-fawr		Pen-y-Bont-Fawr	Settlement	SJ0824
Pen-y-cae	Pen-y-cae			Settlement	SN8413
Pen-y-foel	Pen-y-foel			Settlement	SJ2621
Penygarnedd	Penygarnedd			Settlement	SJ1023
Penygelli	Penygelli			Settlement	SO1291
Pont-dôl-goch	Pont-dôl-goch		Pontdolgoch	Settlement	SO0093
Pont-faen	Pont-faen			Settlement	SN9934
Pont-ffranc	Frank's Bridge			Settlement	SO1155
Pontithel	Pontithel			Settlement	SO1636
Pontllogel	Pontllogel			Settlement	SJ0315
Pontneddfechan	Pontneddfechan			Settlement	SN9007
Pontrobert	Pontrobert			Settlement	SJ1012
Pontsenni	Sennybridge			Settlement	SN9228
Pwllgloyw	Pwllgloyw			Settlement	SO0333
Refail	Refail			Settlement	SJ1900
Rhaeadr Gwy	Rhayader			Settlement	SN9768
Rhiwlas	Rhiwlas			Settlement	SJ1932
Rhiwlen	Rhiwlen			Settlement	SO1349
Rhos-goch	Rhos-goch			Settlement	SO1847
Rhosybrithdir	Rhosybrithdir		Rhos y-brithdir	Settlement	SJ1322
Rhos-y-meirch	Rhos-y-meirch			Settlement	SO2769
Rhosypentref	Rhosypentref			Settlement	SN9582
Rhydlydan	Rhydlydan			Settlement	SO0593
Rhydycroesau	Rhydycroesau			Settlement	SJ2430
Saint Harmon	Saint Harmon		St Harmon	Settlement	SN9872
Saith Maen	Saith Maen			Man-made feature	SN9460
Sarn	Sarn			Settlement	SO2090
Sarnau	Sarnau			Settlement	SJ2315
Sarnau	Sarnau			Settlement	SO0232
Sarn-wen	Sarn-wen			Settlement	SJ2718
Sgethrog	Sgethrog			Settlement	SO1025
Snead	Snead			Settlement	SO3192
Soar	Soar			Settlement	SN9732
Stepaside	Stepaside			Settlement	SO0889
Tafolwern	Tafolwern			Settlement	SH8902
Talachddu	Talachddu			Settlement	SO0833
Talerddig	Talerddig			Settlement	SH9300
Talgarth	Talgarth			Settlement	SO1533
Tal-y-bont	Buttington			Settlement	SJ2408
Tal-y-bont ar Wysg	Talybont-on-Usk			Settlement	SO1122
Tal-y-llyn	Tal-y-llyn			Settlement	SO1027
Tal-y-wern	Tal-y-wern			Settlement	SH8200
Thorn	Thorn			Settlement	SO2763
Tirabad	Tirabad			Settlement	SN8741
Tirymynach	Tirymynach			Area	SH9301
Tirymynach	Tirymynach			Settlement	SJ2612
Trallong	Trallong			Settlement	SN9629
Y Trallwng	Welshpool			Settlement	SJ2207
Trannon	Trannon			Area	SN9095
Treberfedd	Middletown			Settlement	SJ3012
Trecastell	Trecastell			Settlement	SN8829
Tredomen	Tredomen			Settlement	SO1231
Tredwstan	Tredwstan			Settlement	SO1332
Trefaldwyn	Montgomery			Settlement	SO2296
Trefeca	Trefeca			Settlement	SO1432
Trefeglwys	Trefeglwys			Settlement	SN9790
Trefeitha	Trefeitha			Settlement	SO1031
Trefnannau	Trefnannau			Settlement	SJ2015
Trefyclo	Knighton			Settlement	SO2872
Tre-goed	Tregoyd			Settlement	SO1937
Tregynon	Tregynon			Settlement	SO0998
Trelystan	Trelystan			Settlement	SJ2603
Treowen	Treowen			Settlement	SO1191
Tre'r-llai	Leighton			Settlement	SJ2405
Tretŵr	Tretower			Settlement	SO1821
Trewern	Trewern			Settlement	SJ2811
Troedrhiwdalar	Troedrhiwdalar			Settlement	SN9553
Tŷ-crwyn	Tŷ-crwyn			Settlement	SJ1018
Tylwch	Tylwch			Settlement	SN9680
Ucheldre	Ucheldre			Area	SO1398
Uwch-y-coed	Uwch-y-coed			Area	SN8294
Walton	Walton			Settlement	SO2559
Walton Green	Walton Green			Settlement	SO2659
Waun	Waun			Settlement	SJ2319
Waun-fach	Waun-fach			Settlement	SJ2017
Winllan	Winllan			Settlement	SJ2121
Womaston	Womaston			Settlement	SO2660
Ynys Isaf	Ynys Isaf			Settlement	SN7911
Yr Ystog	Churchstoke		Church Stoke	Settlement	SO2794
Ystradfellte	Ystradfellte			Settlement	SN9213
Ystradgynlais	Ystradgynlais			Settlement	SN7810
