= Heartsease (disambiguation) =

Heartsease or viola tricolor, is a common European wild flower.

Heartsease may refer to:

- Heartsease, Knighton, a small settlement in east Powys, Wales
- Heartsease, Llanddewi Ystradenni, a small settlement in central Powys, Wales
- Heartsease Estate, Norwich, a housing estate located in Norwich, Norfolk
- Heartsease (Hillsborough, North Carolina), a historic home
- Heartsease (film), a 1919 American silent drama film
- Heartsease or The Brother's Wife, an 1854 novel by Charlotte Mary Yonge
- Heartsease, a 1969 novel by Peter Dickinson, part of "The Changes" trilogy
- HMS Heartsease
- Heart's Ease (album), an album by Shirley Collins
