= Knighton railway station =

Railway station in Shropshire, England

Knighton Welsh: Trefyclawdd
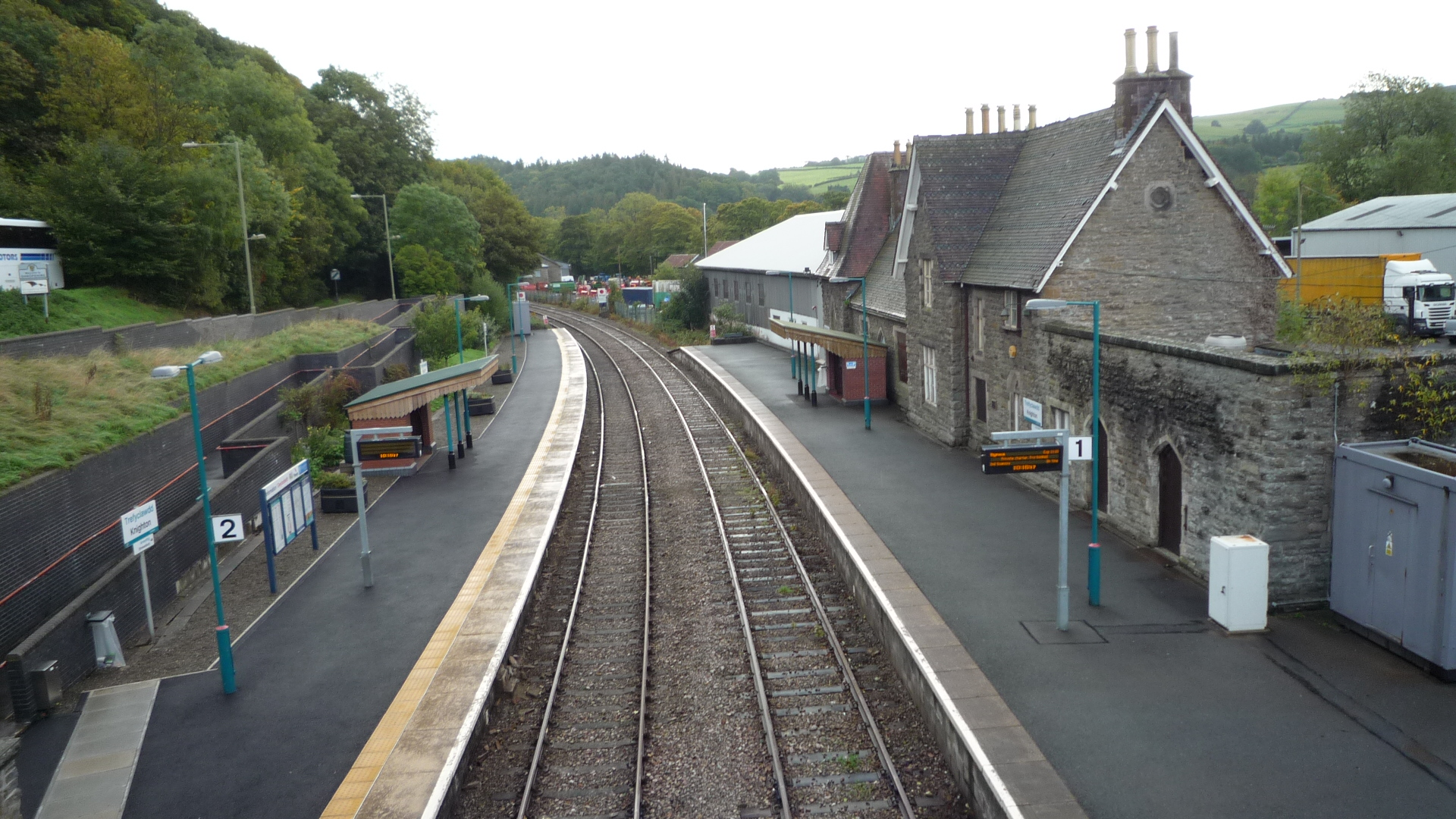

General information
- Location: Knighton, Shropshire Council; England
- Coordinates: 52.345°N 3.042°W
- Grid reference: SO291723
- Manager: Transport for Wales
- Platforms: 2

Other information
- Station code: KNI
- Classification: DfT category F1

Key dates
- 1861: Knighton Railway station opened
- 1865: Present station opened

Passengers
- 2021/22: ▲9,652
- 2022/23: ▲13,582
- 2023/24: ▲17,682
- 2024/25: ▲19,208
- 2025/26: ▲23,178
Location
Notes
- Passenger statistics from the Office of Rail and Road

Knighton railway station serves the border market town of Knighton in Powys, Wales, although the station itself is located in Shropshire, England (the border is immediately adjacent to the south side of the station and runs through the car park). It lies 32 1/2 miles (52.3 km) south west of Shrewsbury (by railway line) on the Heart of Wales Line.

The railway station is located below street level at Station Road beside the River Teme and about 1/2 mile (0.8 km) from the centre of the town. All trains serving the station are operated by Transport for Wales, who also manage the station.

== History ==
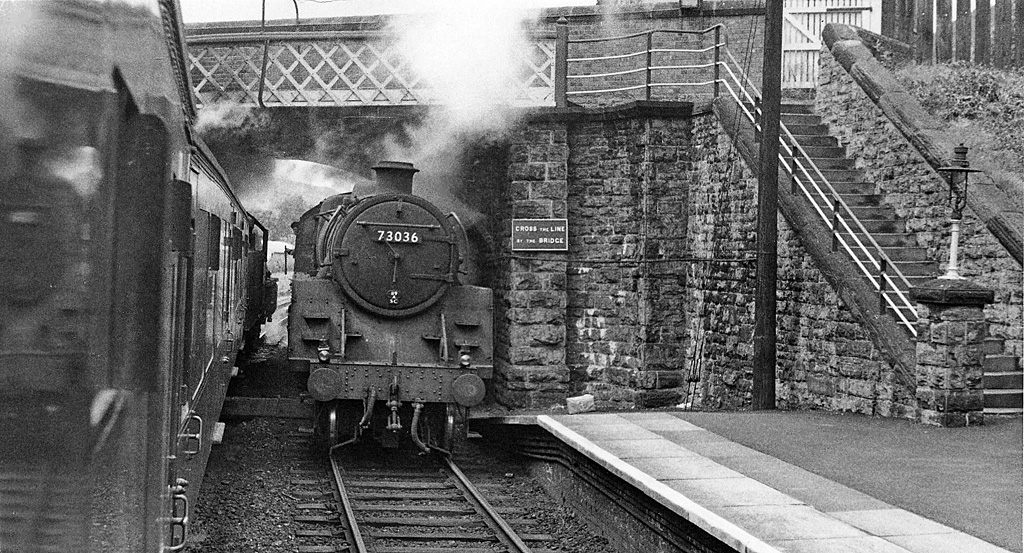
Trains meet at Knighton Station in 1962

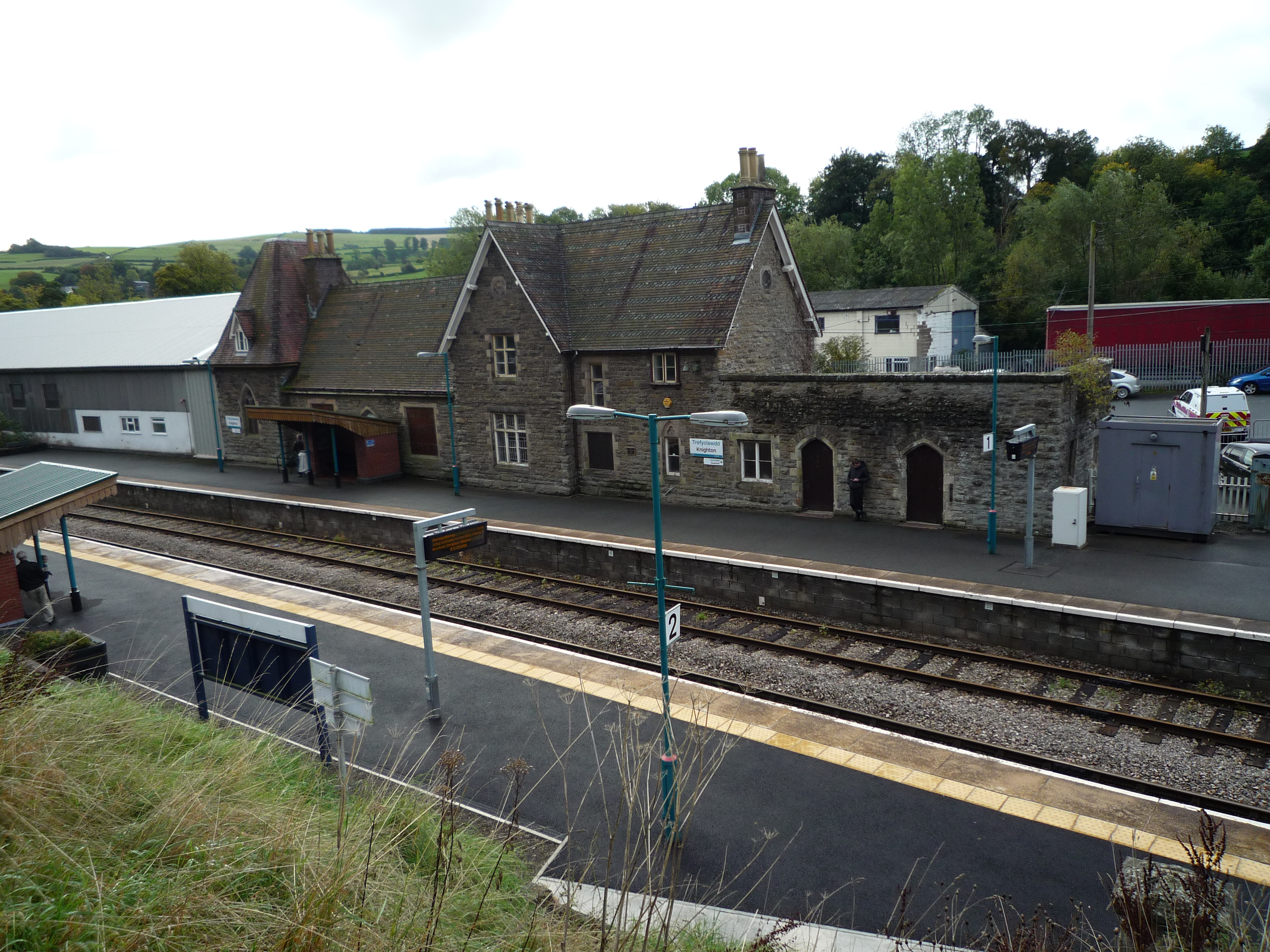
The refurbished station in 2018

The station was built in 1865, although the Knighton Railway route from Craven Arms had reached here four years previously. The present station dates from the opening of the Central Wales Railway to Llandrindod Wells. From here the line begins to climb as it heads west into Wales (on gradients that reach 1 in 60 in places), eventually reaching a summit near Llangynllo some 980 feet (300 m) above sea level.

In 2004 the station was partially refurbished, with visual display units installed to display train departure times and enhanced disabled access on the northbound platform. The station building still stands, but is not used for railway purposes. Tickets must be bought on the train (as the station is unstaffed), whilst there are waiting shelters provided on each side and a customer help point situated on platform 1.

There are two platforms at the station today, although from 1965 until 1990, only a single line and platform (the current southbound one) was used. The 30 miles (48 km) long block section between Craven Arms and Llandrindod Wells was considered to be a capacity bottleneck (even on such a lightly used line) however and following the modernisation of the route signalling in 1986, an additional passing loop was installed here to provide extra capacity, with the disused second platform being refurbished and returned to use by British Rail. The northbound loop (and platform) was out of action for more than two years but was put back into use by Network Rail in September 2010 following the replacement of the old automatic points (which were obsolete) with new electrically worked ones.

== Proposed Knighton to Presteigne railway ==
The plans for a proposed Knighton to Presteigne Railway were deposited on 30 November 1865.

== Services ==
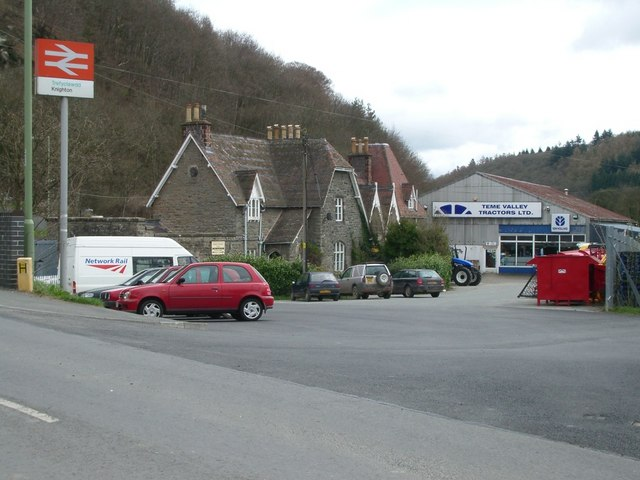
View from the road; the England-Wales border runs through the car park

There are five trains a day to Swansea from Monday to Saturday, plus another early morning one as far as Llandrindod on weekdays only. Northbound, there are six trains to Shrewsbury on weekdays and five on Saturdays. Two services each way call on Sundays.

Preceding station	National Rail	Following station
Knucklas	Transport for Wales; Heart of Wales Line	Bucknell
