= Knucklas railway station =

Railway station in Powys, Wales

Knucklas Welsh: Cnwclas
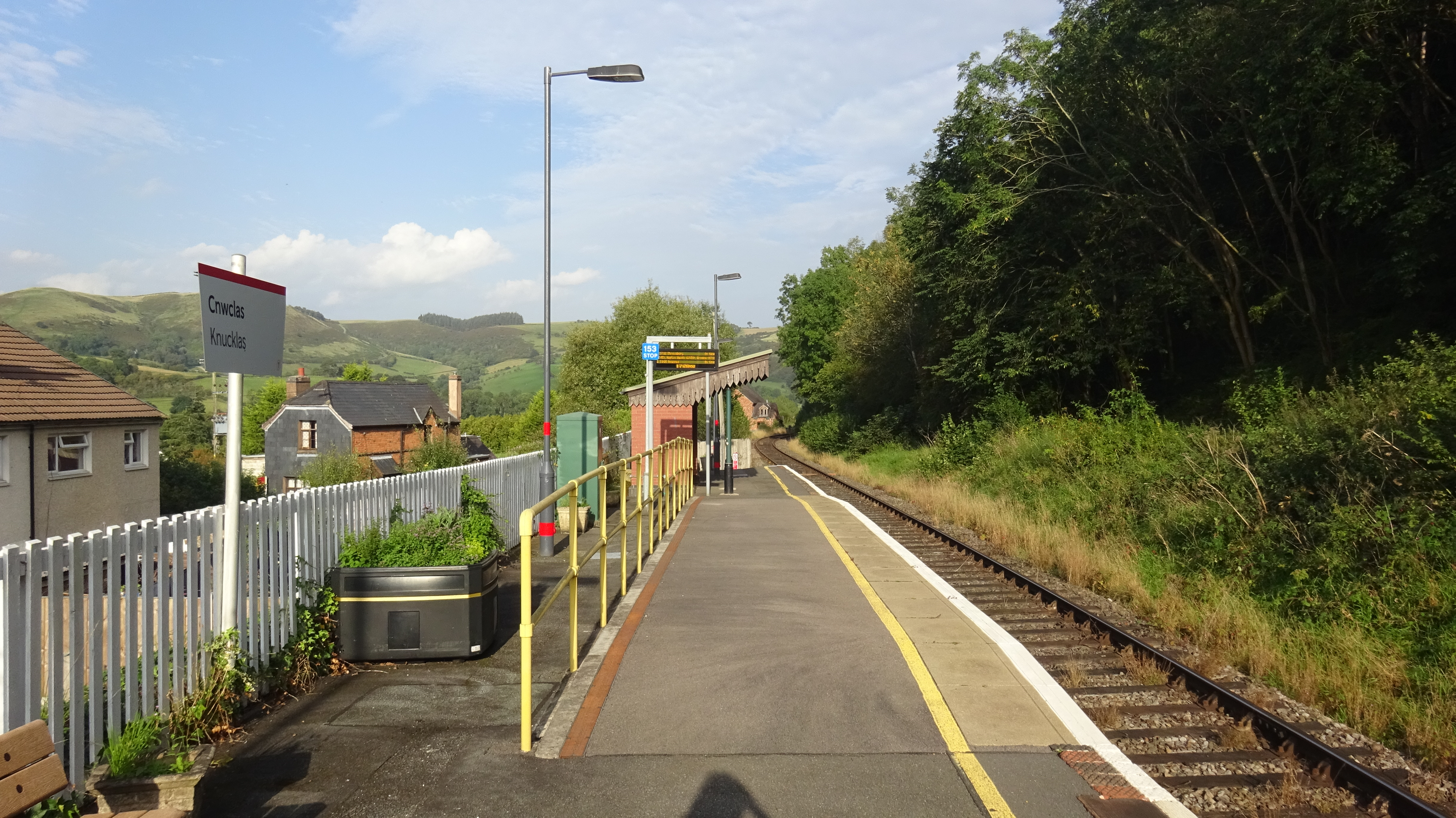

General information
- Location: Knucklas, Powys; Wales
- Coordinates: 52.360°N 3.097°W
- Grid reference: SO254740
- Manager: Transport for Wales
- Platforms: 1

Other information
- Station code: KNU
- Classification: DfT category F2

History
- Opened: 1865

Passengers
- 2021/22: ▲2,114
- 2022/23: ▲2,634
- 2023/24: ▲3,050
- 2024/25: ▲4,156
- 2025/26: ▲4,448
Location
Notes
- Passenger statistics from the Office of Rail and Road

Knucklas railway station serves the village of Knucklas, Powys, Wales, 34 3/4 miles (55.9 km) south west of Shrewsbury.

The station is located on a steep hillside overlooking the village and operates as a request stop. Passengers wishing to board are required to signal to the driver, while those intending to alight must notify the train staff.

After departing from the station in the westerly direction, trains pass over the 190 yd (173 m) long Knucklas viaduct. This is one of the major structures on the route, its 13 stone arches carrying the line at a maximum height of 75 feet (23 m) across the Heyope valley and Knucklas village. The route then climbs sharply from east to west for the next 4 miles (6.4 km) on a ruling gradient of 1 in 60, en route to the summit of the line just to the south of Llangynllo Tunnel.

All trains serving the station are operated by Transport for Wales.

== Facilities ==
The station is unstaffed and has no remaining permanent buildings aside from a brick and timber waiting shelter. Other amenities offered include CIS screen, customer help point, public telephone and timetable poster board. Step-free access is available from the car park and entry road from the adjoining residential estate, though the access ramp is quite steep.

== Services ==
There are five trains a day to Swansea southbound and six to Shrewsbury northbound from Monday to Friday (five on Saturdays), along with two services each way on Sundays.

Preceding station	National Rail	Following station
Llangynllo	Transport for Wales; Heart of Wales Line	Knighton
