= Charles Ashton (historian) =

Welsh literary historian and bibliophile

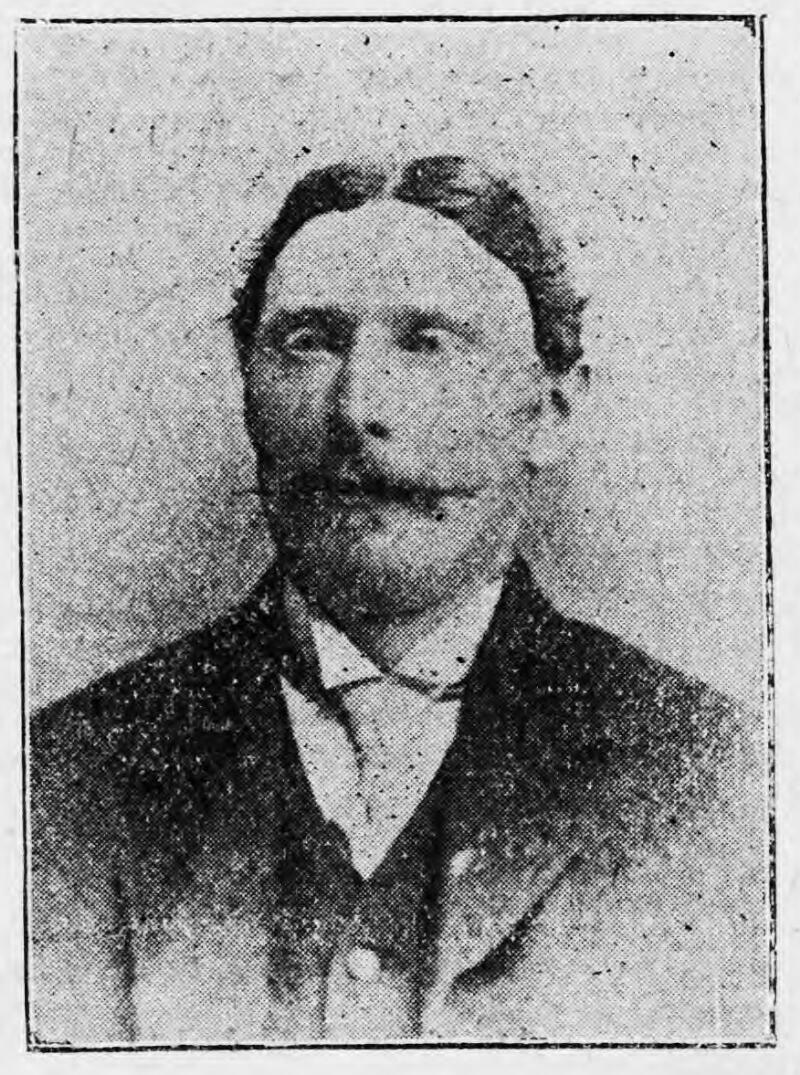
Charles Ashton

Charles Ashton (c. 1848 – 13 October 1899) was a Welsh literary historian and bibliophile, born in Llawr-y-glyn, Montgomeryshire (Powys).

He was a professional police officer, but he is primarily remembered for a thorough survey of 17th to 19th century Welsh literature which he published in 1893. In 1899, he attacked his own wife with a razor and then killed himself in an apparent attempt at murder-suicide.

== Historical work ==
A police officer by profession, Ashton is chiefly remembered for his pioneering and thorough survey of 17th to 19th century Welsh literature, Hanes Llenyddiaeth Gymreig o 1651 hyd 1850, published in 1893. He also published a history of Dinas Mawddwy in 1892.

== Attack on his wife and suicide ==
Ashton committed suicide after attacking his wife with a razor in 1899.

== Works ==
- Bywyd ac Amserau yr Esgob Morgan (1891)
- Gweithiau Iolo Goch (1896)
- Hanes Llenyddiaeth Gymreig 1650-1850 (1893)
- Llyfryddiaeth y 19eg Ganrif (1908)
