= Abergwydol =

Coordinates: 52.60667°N 3.780000°W

- Location within Powys
- Community: Cadfarch
- Principal area: Powys
- Preserved county: Powys
- Country: Wales
- Sovereign state: United Kingdom
- Post town: Machynlleth
- Postcode district: SY20
- Dialling code: 01650
- Police: Dyfed-Powys
- Fire: Mid and West Wales
- Ambulance: Welsh
- UK Parliament: Montgomeryshire and Glyndŵr
- Senedd Cymru – Welsh Parliament: Montgomeryshire

Abergwydol (Welsh pronunciation) is a village in the community of Cadfarch, in the principal area of Powys, Wales located on the A489 road between Cemmaes Road and Penegoes.
