= Aneurin Jones =

Welsh painter (1930–2017)

- Born: 1930; Cwm Wysg
- Died: 25 September 2017 (aged 87)
- Education: Swansea College of Art
- Known for: Painter
- Awards: Rotary Award

Aneurin M. Jones (1930 – 25 September 2017) was a Welsh painter.

== Life and work ==
Jones was born in Cwm Wysg on the Brecknockshire/Carmarthenshire border to a farmer's family. He studied Fine Art at Swansea College of Art from 1950 to 1955. He then worked as a teacher at Ysgol y Preseli, Crymych (becoming Head of Art) until 1986.

In 1978 Jones received a Rotary Award for outstanding service to Art. He exhibited regularly at the National Eisteddfod of Wales and won the main art prize there in 1981.

Jones paintings often dwell on the old ways of life in the Wales countryside, sometimes making sketches at farm sales (where unwanted farm equipment ius sold off). He compared his life to that of a farmer, saying "An artist ploughs their own furrow; painting is very personal in terms of the pattern, the shape and the mood it creates." In 2013 a Jones painting of Welsh cobs was presented to Charles, Prince of Wales at the Royal Welsh Show.

His paintings are in the public collections of the National Library of Wales, Ceredigion Museum and MOMA Wales as well as collections overseas.

His son, Meirion Jones, is a well-known painter too.
