= Aberbechan =

Coordinates: 52.532°N 03.266°W

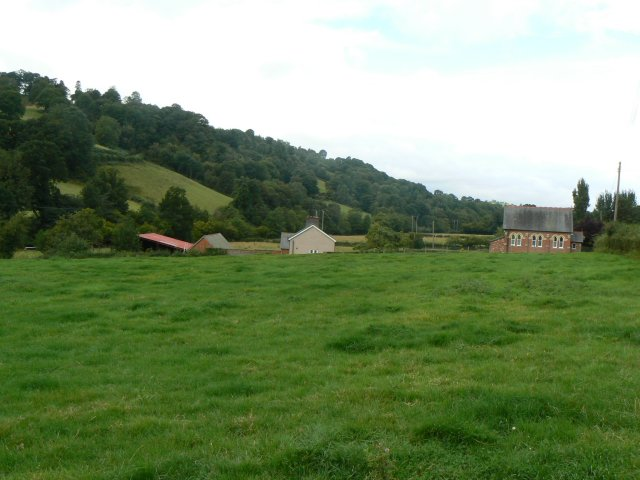
- Aberbechan Presbyterian Church The red brick building to the right in this view.

- Location within Powys
- OS grid reference: SO1394
- Principal area: Powys
- Preserved county: Powys
- Country: Wales
- Sovereign state: United Kingdom
- Post town: NEWTOWN
- Dialling code: 01686
- Police: Dyfed-Powys
- Fire: Mid and West Wales
- Ambulance: Welsh
- UK Parliament: Montgomeryshire and Glyndŵr

Aberbechan was formerly a township in the parish of Llanllwchaearn in the historic county of Montgomeryshire. The township of Aberbechan was transferred to Bettws Cedewain and more recently moved, together with the township of Dolforwyn, into the community of Abermule and Llandyssil in Powys, Wales.

There is a chapel. The former township is also the home of Aberbechan Hall.

== See also ==
- Aberbechan Hall
