= Llanbister Road railway station =

Railway station in Powys, Wales

Llanbister Road
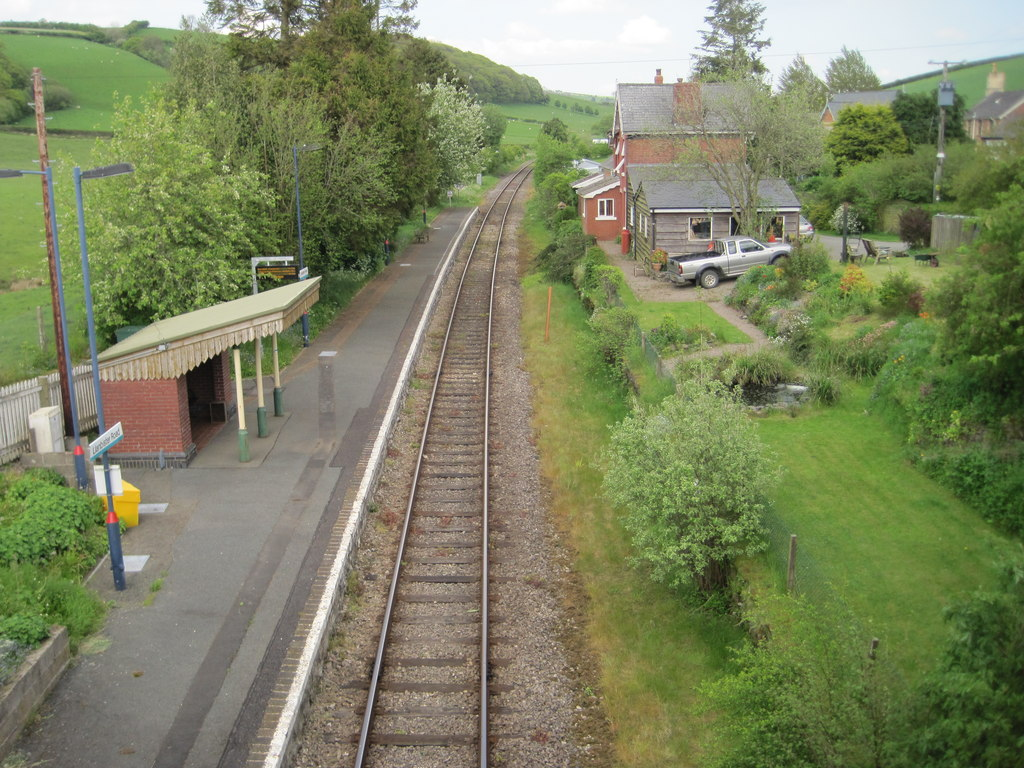

General information
- Location: Llanbister Road, Powys; Wales
- Coordinates: 52.336°N 3.213°W
- Grid reference: SO174716
- Manager: Transport for Wales
- Platforms: 1

Other information
- Station code: LLT
- Classification: DfT category F2

Key dates
- 1 December 1868: Opened to the public

Passengers
- 2021/22: ▲514
- 2022/23: ▲592
- 2023/24: ▲1,214
- 2024/25: ▼990
- 2025/26: ▲1,004
Location
Notes
- Passenger statistics from the Office of Rail and Road

Llanbister Road railway station is a countryside railway station about 5 miles (8 km) from the village of Llanbister, Powys, Wales. The station is 21 miles 55 chains (34.9 km) from Craven Arms South Junction, on the Heart of Wales Line between Llangynllo and Dolau. The unstaffed station is located at street level adjacent to the bridge carrying a minor road. All trains serving the station are operated by Transport for Wales.

== History ==
Although the station was built and in use a couple of years beforehand, it was opened to the public fully from 1 December 1868.

The station was originally built for operational reasons, being the location where the line switched between single and double track. The former signal box has since been demolished.

== Facilities ==
As with most others on the route, it has been fitted with a digital CIS display and customer help point in addition to the standard timetable poster board and waiting shelter. Part of the platform has been raised to allow travellers to board and alight from trains without the need for portable stairs, but no level access is available from the main entrance.

The former station building still survives opposite the remaining active platform, though it is now a private residence.

== Passenger volume ==
As with other remote stations on the line (including neighbouring Llangynllo), it is among the least used stations in Wales.

Passenger volume at Llanbister Road
	2004–05	2005–06	2006–07	2007–08	2008–09	2009–10	2010–11	2011–12	2012–13	2013–14	2014–15	2015–16	2016–17	2017–18	2018–19	2019–20	2020–21	2021–22	2022–23	2023–24	2024–25
Entries and exits	852	1,323	770	1,245	1,566	1,668	1,172	1,554	1,596	1,390	1,242	978	860	992	930	1,134	20	514	592	1,214	990

The statistics cover twelve month periods that start in April.

== Services ==
There are five trains a day in each direction (towards Shrewsbury eastbound and Llanelli westbound) from Monday to Saturday (plus an additional service to Shrewsbury on Mon-Fri only), and two services on Sundays. This is a request stop, whereby passengers have to signal to the driver to board or alight from the train.

Preceding station	National Rail	Following station
Dolau	Transport for Wales; Heart of Wales Line	Llangynllo

== Community rail ==
The station, along with all others on the line, is promoted by the Heart of Wales Community Rail Partnership.

== Bibliography ==
- Caton, Peter (2018). Remote Stations. Leicestershire: Matador. ISBN 978-1-78901-408-2.
- Organ, John (2008). Mitchell, Vic (ed.). Craven Arms to Llandeilo. West Sussex: Middleton Press. figs. 38-41. ISBN 9781906008352. OCLC 648080889.
- Quick, Michael (2023). Railway Passenger Stations in Great Britain: A Chronology (PDF) (5th ed.). London: Railway and Canal Historical Society.
