= Whitton, Powys =

Village and community in Powys, Wales

Whitton: Welsh: Llanddewi-yn-Hwytyn or Hwytyn
- Location within Powys
- Population: 348 (2011)
- OS grid reference: SO25856767
- Principal area: Powys
- Preserved county: Powys
- Country: Wales
- Sovereign state: United Kingdom
- Post town: KNIGHTON
- Postcode district: LD7
- Post town: PRESTEIGNE
- Postcode district: LD8
- Police: Dyfed-Powys
- Fire: Mid and West Wales
- Ambulance: Welsh
- UK Parliament: Brecon, Radnor and Cwm Tawe
- Senedd Cymru – Welsh Parliament: Brecon and Radnorshire
- List of places UK Wales Powys 52.3068°N 3.0909°W Community map: Map of the community

Whitton (Welsh: Llanddewi-yn-Hwytyn; standardised: Hwytyn) is a village and a community in Radnorshire, Powys, Wales. It is located on the B4356 road 4 miles (6 km) south of Knighton. Hamlets in the community include Rhos-y-meirch and Pilleth.

The community's population in 2011 was 348.

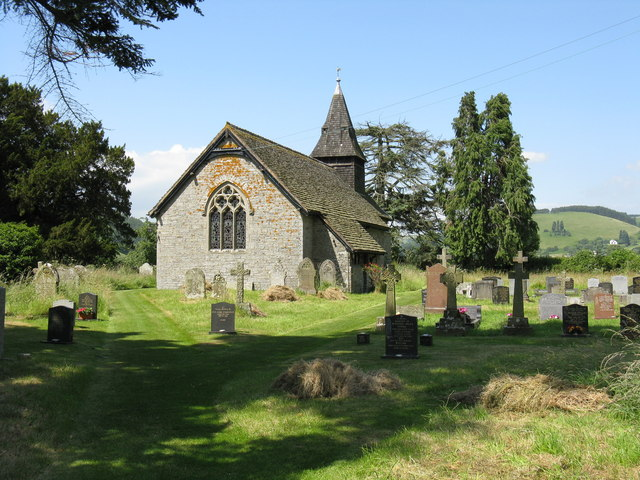
St Mary's church

St Mary's church is a grade II* listed building.

The community is part of the Llangunllo with Norton electoral ward for elections to Powys County Council.
