= Dolau railway station =

Railway station in Powys, Wales

Dolau
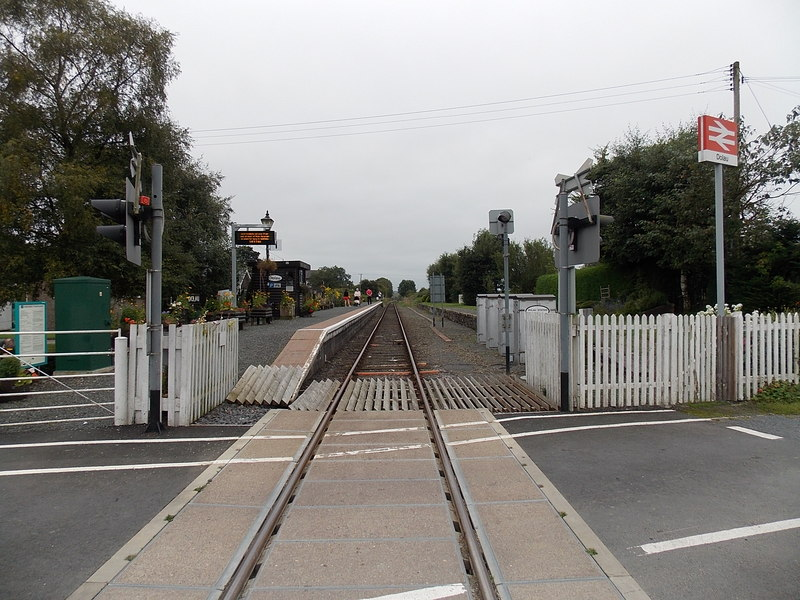

General information
- Location: Dolau, Powys; Wales
- Coordinates: 52.295°N 3.264°W
- Grid reference: SO139670
- Manager: Transport for Wales
- Platforms: 1

Other information
- Station code: DOL
- Classification: DfT category F2

History
- Opened: 1865

Passengers
- 2021/22: ▲380
- 2022/23: ▲680
- 2023/24: ▲828
- 2024/25: ▼818
- 2025/26: ▲918
Location
Notes
- Passenger statistics from the Office of Rail and Road

Dolau railway station is an unstaffed railway station with one platform serving the small village of Dolau in Powys, mid Wales. It is located on the Heart of Wales Line.

Passenger services are operated by Transport for Wales. It is a request stop for southbound trains only - those heading towards Shrewsbury have to stop here so that the train crew can activate the controls for the adjacent half barrier level crossing.

== History ==
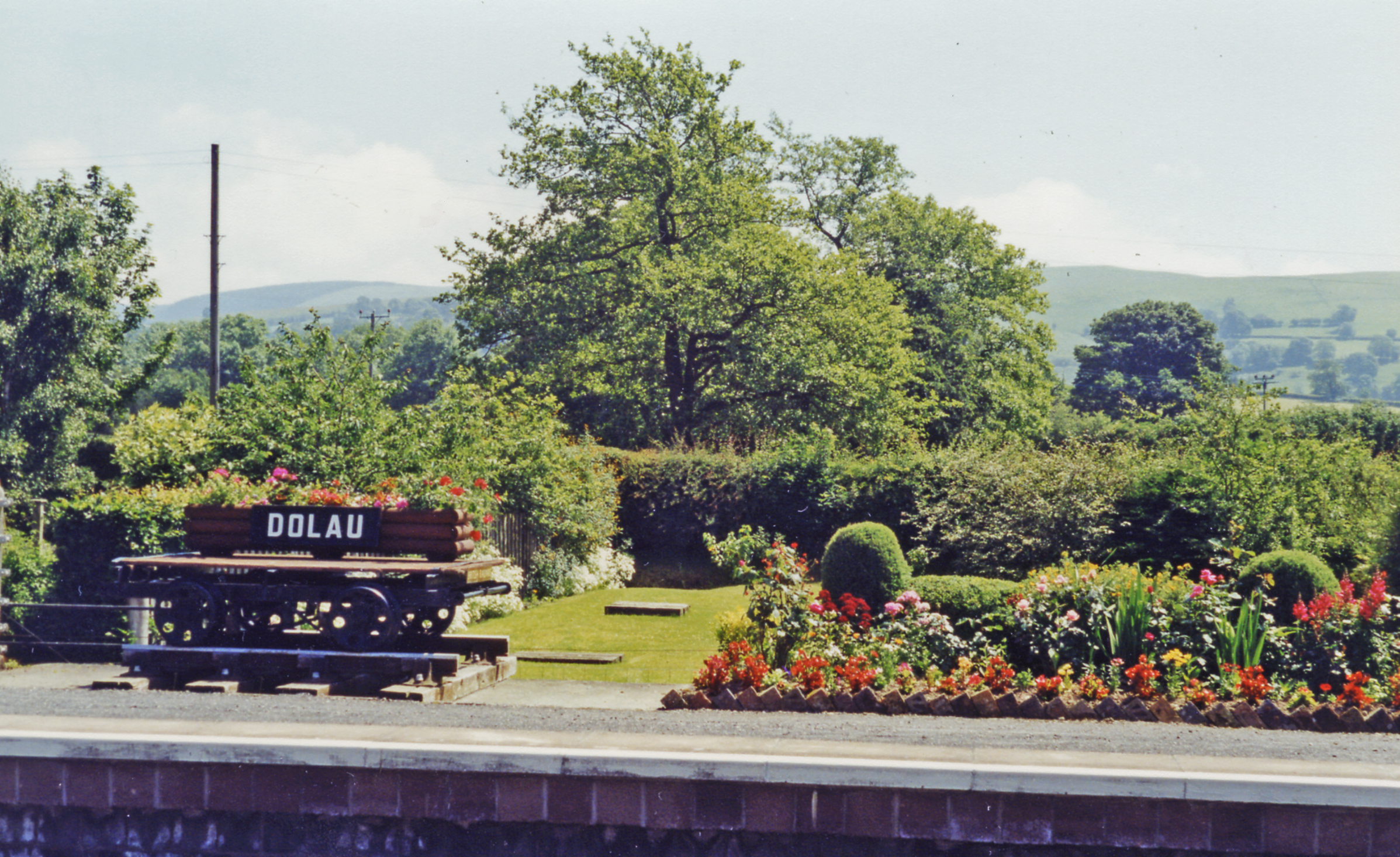
The station garden in 1997

The station is tended to by the Dolau Station Action Group, who has decorated the platform with plants, flowers, a wooden waiting shelter and clock. The shelter houses a guestbook as well as the awards the station has received.

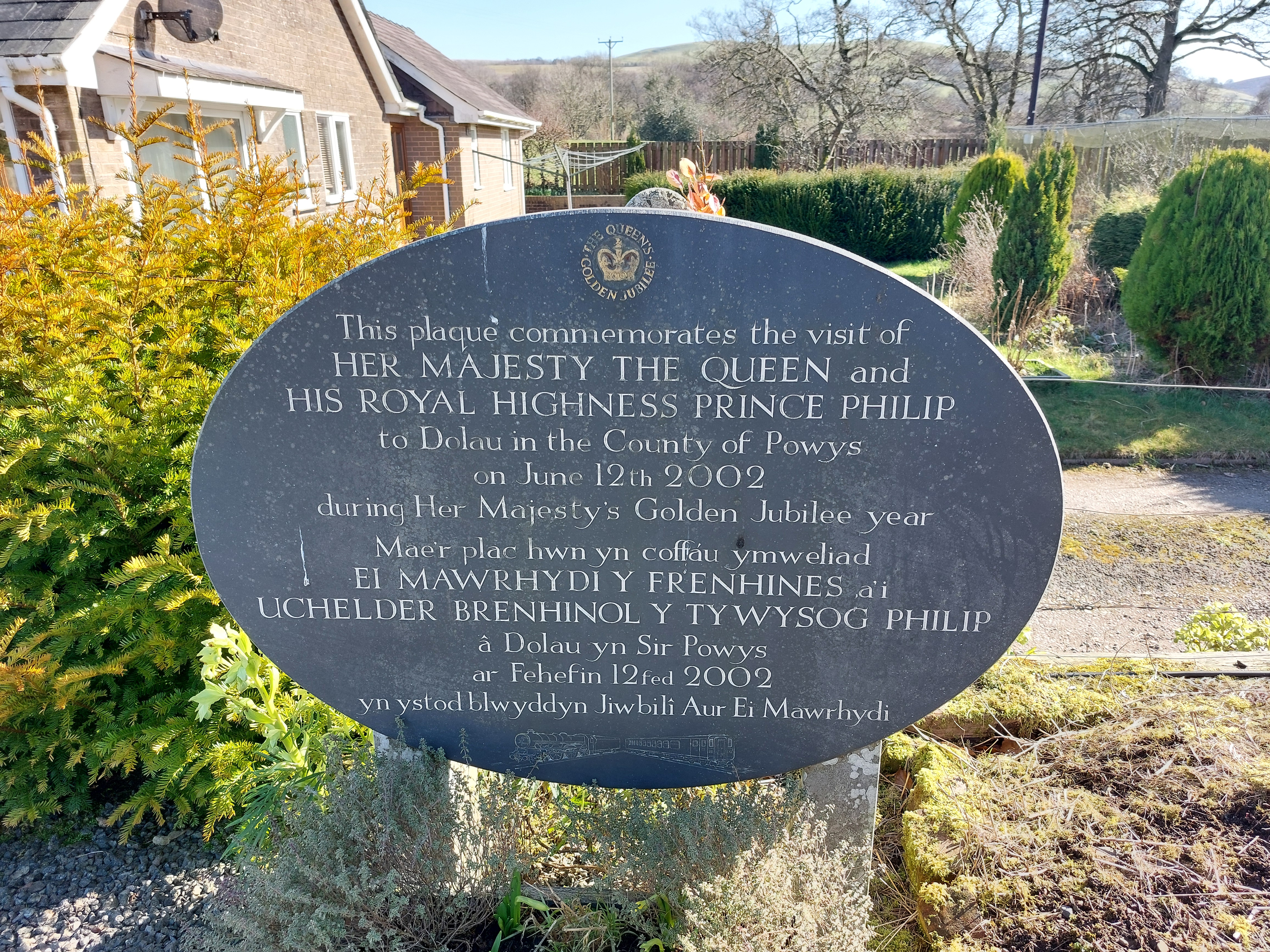
Commemorative plaque unveiled in 2002

Queen Elizabeth II unveiled a plaque at the station in 2002 commemorating her visit during the Golden Jubilee visit to Wales.

Formerly known as Dolau Halt, the suffix was dropped in 1969.

== Facilities ==
Like most other stations on the route, it has been fitted with a digital information screen and customer help point to provide train running details. It also has a bicycle rack and payphone.

== Services ==
It is served by five trains each direction Monday to Saturday (plus a sixth northbound service on weekdays only) and two trains each way on Sundays.

Preceding station	National Rail	Following station
Pen-y-Bont	Transport for Wales; Heart of Wales Line	Llanbister Road
