= Cadfarch =

Community in Powys, Wales

- Population: 855 (2011)
  - Cardiff: 109 mi (175 km)
- Community: Cadfarch
- Principal area: Powys
- Preserved county: Powys
- Country: Wales
- Sovereign state: United Kingdom
- Post town: Machynlleth
- Postcode district: SY20
- Dialling code: 01650
- Police: Dyfed-Powys
- Fire: Mid and West Wales
- Ambulance: Welsh
- UK Parliament: Montgomeryshire and Glyndŵr
- Senedd Cymru – Welsh Parliament: Montgomeryshire
- Website: Cadfarch Community Council
- List of places UK Wales Powys 52.561°N 3.89932°W Map of the community

Cadfarch is a community a few miles to the south and southeast of Machynlleth in Powys (previously Montgomeryshire) in Wales. The community's western and southern border is with the neighbouring county of Ceredigion, while the northwest corner touches Gwynedd.

The community includes the villages and settlements of Penegoes, Forge, Derwenlas and Abergwydol. also Aberhosan and Melinbyrhedyn. In 2011 the community had a population of 855 with 538 of them Welsh speakers. It has the highest Welsh identity in Montgomeryshire, with 66% having some form of Welsh identity.

"Cadfarch" is also the name of a 6th-century Welsh saint and the church at Penegoes is dedicated to him.

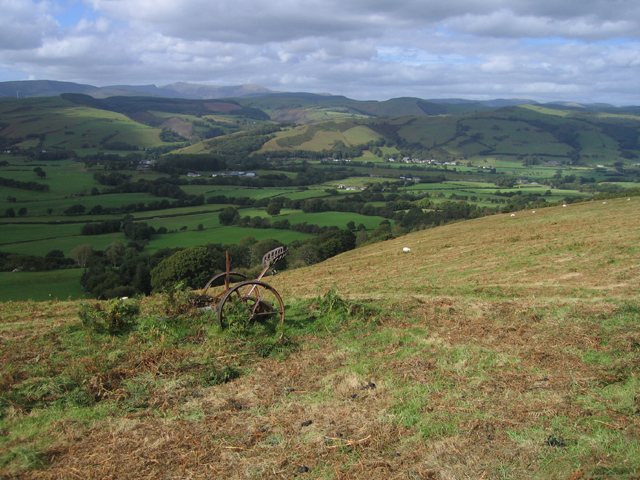
The Dyfi valley
