= Buddugre Castle =

Motte and bailey castle in Powys, Wales

Coordinates: 52.3175°N 3.3208°W

Buddugre Castle (sometimes referred to as Tomen Bedd-Ugre, Tomen Bedd Turc and Bedd-y-gre) was a motte and bailey defensive fortification overlooking the River Ithon, located in the community of Llanddewi Ystradenny, in Radnorshire (modern-day Powys), Wales. It is believed to have been built as a defensive measure in the medieval period, during the 12th century, as a timber castle.

== History ==
Owain, King of Gwynedd is credited with building the castle in Budugre in 1149 as a defense measure for the vale of Clwyd. This brought Owain close to conflict with Madog ap Maredudd, the ruler of Powys who was opposed to any encroachment of his powers. It is also said that it could have been built by Cadwallon, set high on top of a hill instead of in a valley akin to Norman castles of this period.

== Features ==
The castle structures on the mound located at the southern extremity of a ridge that faces south. The slopes of the ridge are towards west and south and on its east towards the Ithon Valley but are long gone, but the land still clearly bears the marks of a ditched motte. The motte has a diameter of 34 metres (112 ft) and raises to a height of 6 metres (20 ft), with an oval embankment and ditched bailey; the ditch measuring 1 metre (3 ft 3 in). The ditched bailey measures 38 by 56 metres (125 ft × 184 ft). There are indications of a rectangular range surrounding the motte which measures 26 by 10 metres (85 ft × 33 ft) in an eastern direction. The top of the mound is flat, over which it is conjectured that a structure made either of timber or stone had existed as a defensive measure. Also seen close to the mound are "crop marks" which could have been a court, the llys. Y The ditch that surrounds the motte has two 2 causeways over it running from the south and south-west. There is entry to the bailey from the south. A hut platform inside the bailey facing the south-west causeway over the ditch is made of earth and measures about 12 by 5 metres (39 ft × 16 ft).
