= Aberbechan Hall =

- Location in Montgomeryshire
- 52.539041°N 3.269552°W
- Location: Newtown and Llanllwchaiarn, Montgomeryshire, Wales

History
- Built: 16th Century
- Built for: Blayney family
- Demolished: 1870

Site notes
- Architectural style: Timber framed Jettied house

Aberbechan Hall was a timber framed mansion in the township of Aberbechan within the parish of Llanllwchaearn in the historic county of Montgomeryshire. The township of Aberbechan was transferred to Bettws Cedewain and more recently moved, with the township of Dolforwyn, into the community of Abermule with Llandyssil. The Hall was originally built by the Blayney family, passing to the Price and Lloyd families, before becoming the property of Sir Gervais Clifton. In 1810 it was sold to David Pugh of Llanerchydol near Welshpool. The Hall was demolished in 1870 and replaced by the present Hall.

== History of the Hall ==
This was a house that had been built by the senior branch of the Blayney family, but Rhys ap Morris (Blayney) became High Sheriff of Montgomeryshire in 1565, the family name changed to Price (ap Rhys). The house descended to Sir John Price, who swapped sides in the Civil War and became the Parliamentary Commander of Montgomery Castle. The Hall then passed to his son Sir Richard Price. The house passed to the Lloyd family, but in 1766, the heiress Frances Lloyd married Sir Gervais Clifton. This was probably a case of an Englishmen prowling for Welsh heiresses. Sir Gervais Clifton 6th.Baronet was a leading Nottinghamshire landowner and is likely to have been an absentee landlord. The house and its estates were later sold in 1810 to David Pugh, a fabulously wealthy London Tea dealer, who was to build the castellated, Gothic Revival house at Llanerchydol Hall, on the outskirts of Welshpool.

=== Visit of Thomas Pennant ===
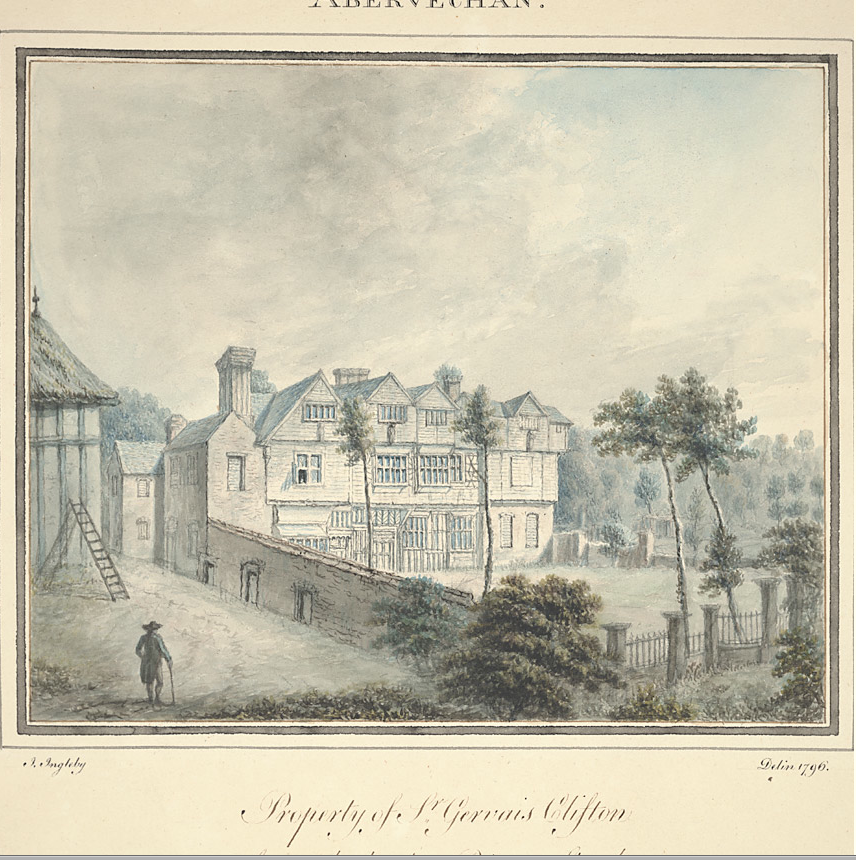
Aberbechan Hall 1796

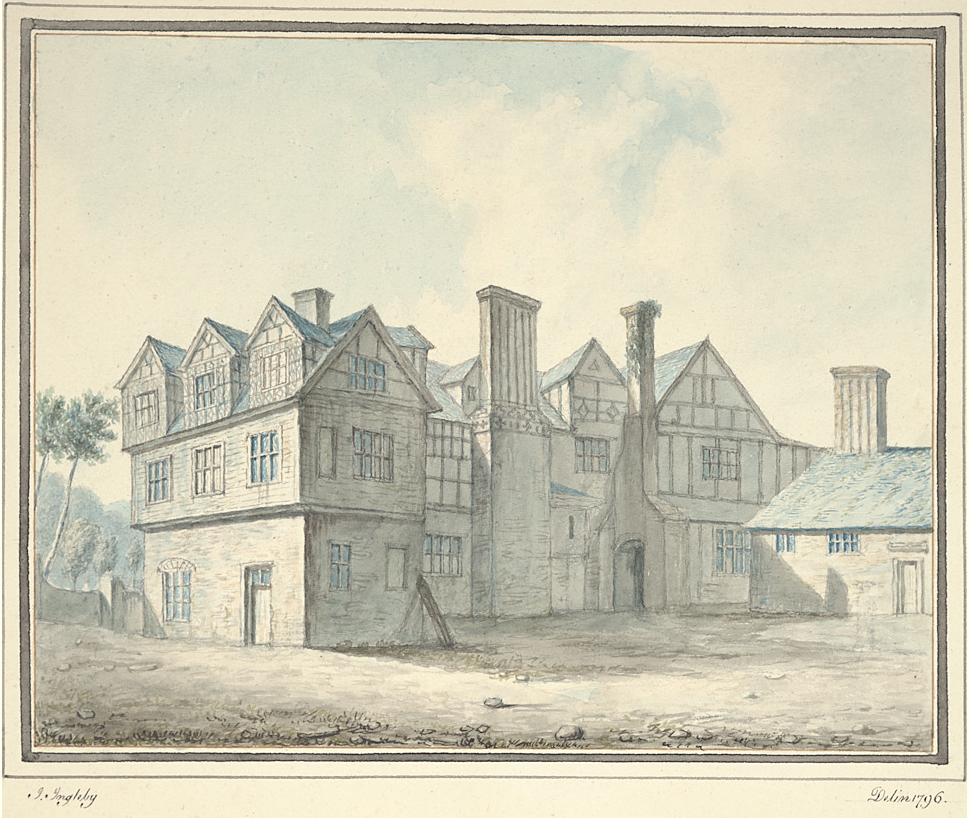
Aberbechan Hall 1796

Not far from Dolforwyn is Abervechan, an old house; which, after being owned by the Blaineys, the Prices, and the Lloyds, is now possesd by Sir Gervase Clifton, Baronet, by virtue of his marriage with the heiress of the place, daughter of Richard, Lloyd, Esq.

— Thomas Pennant: A Tour in Wales. Bridge Books reprint, Wrexham, Vol 2, 372
1990

In 1786, Thomas Pennant, who was staying with Arthur Blayney at Gregynog and they passed Aberbechan when visiting Dolforwyn Castle. Pennant in 1796 commissioned John Ingleby to produce two watercolours of Aberbechan Hall, which presumably he intended to use an illustration in a future edition of the Tour in Wales. These watercolours, which are now in the collections of the National Library of Wales, would appear to be the only surviving depictions of the Hall, which must have been an impressive timber-framed building. The Hall, as shown in Ingleby's watercolours is likely to have been built in the earlier years of the 17th century or perhaps slightly earlier.

The Hall must have been one of the grandest in the county, and appears to bear much in common with the Herberts’ house at Lymore on the outskirts of Montgomery. Both houses were built in a combination of brick and timber-framing and both have series of triangular roof gables with windows set in them. More striking is the way in which Aberbechan Hall is jettied out on each floor. The brick chimneys are square sectioned, in contrast to the star sectioned chimney stacks seen on earlier timber-framed houses of the area.

== Literature ==
- Humphreys M The Crisis of Community: Montgomeryshire 1680-1815, University of Wales Press, Cardiff, 1996, pg 103
