= Llanddewi Ystradenni =

Community in Powys, Wales

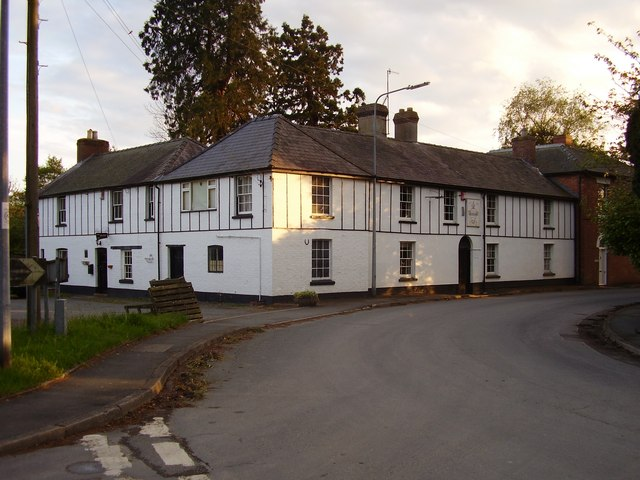
- The Walsh public house

- Location within Powys
- Population: 310 (2011 census)
- Community: Llanddewi Ystradenny
- Principal area: Powys
- Country: Wales
- Sovereign state: United Kingdom
- Police: Dyfed-Powys
- Fire: Mid and West Wales
- Ambulance: Welsh
- List of places UK Wales Powys 52°18′0″N 3°18′0″W Community map: Map of the community

Llanddewi Ystradenni, also spelled Llanddewi Ystradenny, is a village and community in Radnorshire, Powys, Wales. The population of the Community at the 2011 census was 310.

Centred on the village of Llanddewi, it also includes the hamlet of Heartsease.

The motte and bailey fortification of Buddugre Castle, overlooking the Afon Ithon, is also within the community.
