= Cwmwysg =

Hamlet in the county of Powys, Wales

Coordinates: 51°56′29″N 3°40′20″W

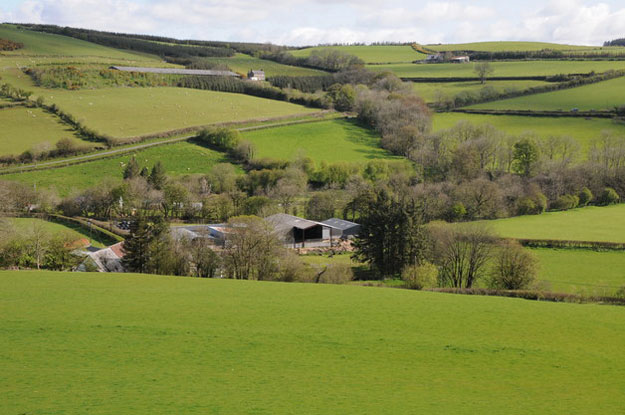
Cwmwysg viewed from the south

Cwmwysg (Welsh for "Usk valley") is a small rural village southwest of Trecastle in the valley of the Usk river, Powys, Wales.

It includes the Saron Independent Chapel, originally built in 1822 and rebuilt in 1856. The humpback stone river bridge over the Usk is Grade II listed.

The Welsh painter Aneurin Jones (1930–2017) was born in Cwmwysg.
