= Dolau =

Village in Powys, Wales

Dolau (Welsh pronunciation) is a small village in Powys, Mid Wales. It is situated in the community of Llanfihangel Rhydithon on the edge of Radnor Forest, in the historic county of Radnorshire. In the 2011 Census the population Llanfihangel Rhydithon totalled 228 residents.

The village lies on the Heart of Wales Railway Line that runs from Shrewsbury to Swansea. It is served by Dolau railway station, which features a wooden waiting shelter with a clock outside. Queen Elizabeth II unveiled a plaque at the station on 12 June 2002 commemorating her visit during the Golden Jubilee visit to Wales. The station is cared for by an enthusiastic group of volunteers known as Dolau Station Action Group and over the years has won numerous awards for its floral displays, including the best kept unstaffed station in the UK and Ireland. These awards are hung up in the station shelter.

The village school is Llanfihangel Rhydithon (Dolau) County Primary School. The village has a modern community hall which is the home for a number of active groups including Dolau Young Farmers, Dolau Youth Club, Dolau Playgroup, Dolau Mixtures Choir, Dolau Short Mat Bowls Club and Dolau WI.
