= Aberhosan =

Village in Powys, Wales

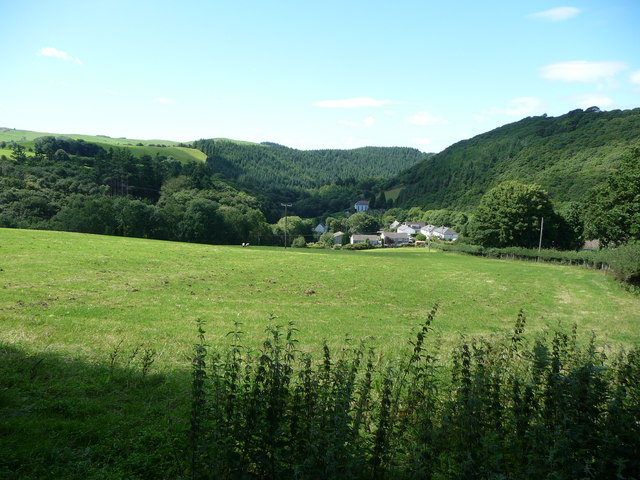
- Viewed from near Ty-gwyn farm

- Location within Powys
- OS grid reference: SN811973
- Community: Cadfarch
- Principal area: Powys
- Preserved county: Powys
- Country: Wales
- Sovereign state: United Kingdom
- Post town: MACHYNLLETH
- Postcode district: SY20
- Dialling code: 01654
- Police: Dyfed-Powys
- Fire: Mid and West Wales
- Ambulance: Welsh
- UK Parliament: Montgomeryshire and Glyndŵr
- Senedd Cymru – Welsh Parliament: Montgomeryshire

Aberhosan (Welsh pronunciation) is a village in the community of Cadfarch, Powys, located between the town of Machynlleth and village of Dylife. It is in the historic county of Montgomeryshire.

== History ==
The village school closed before 1971, and is now the village hall. The village has a chapel but its shop has closed.

=== Wynford Vaughan-Thomas ===
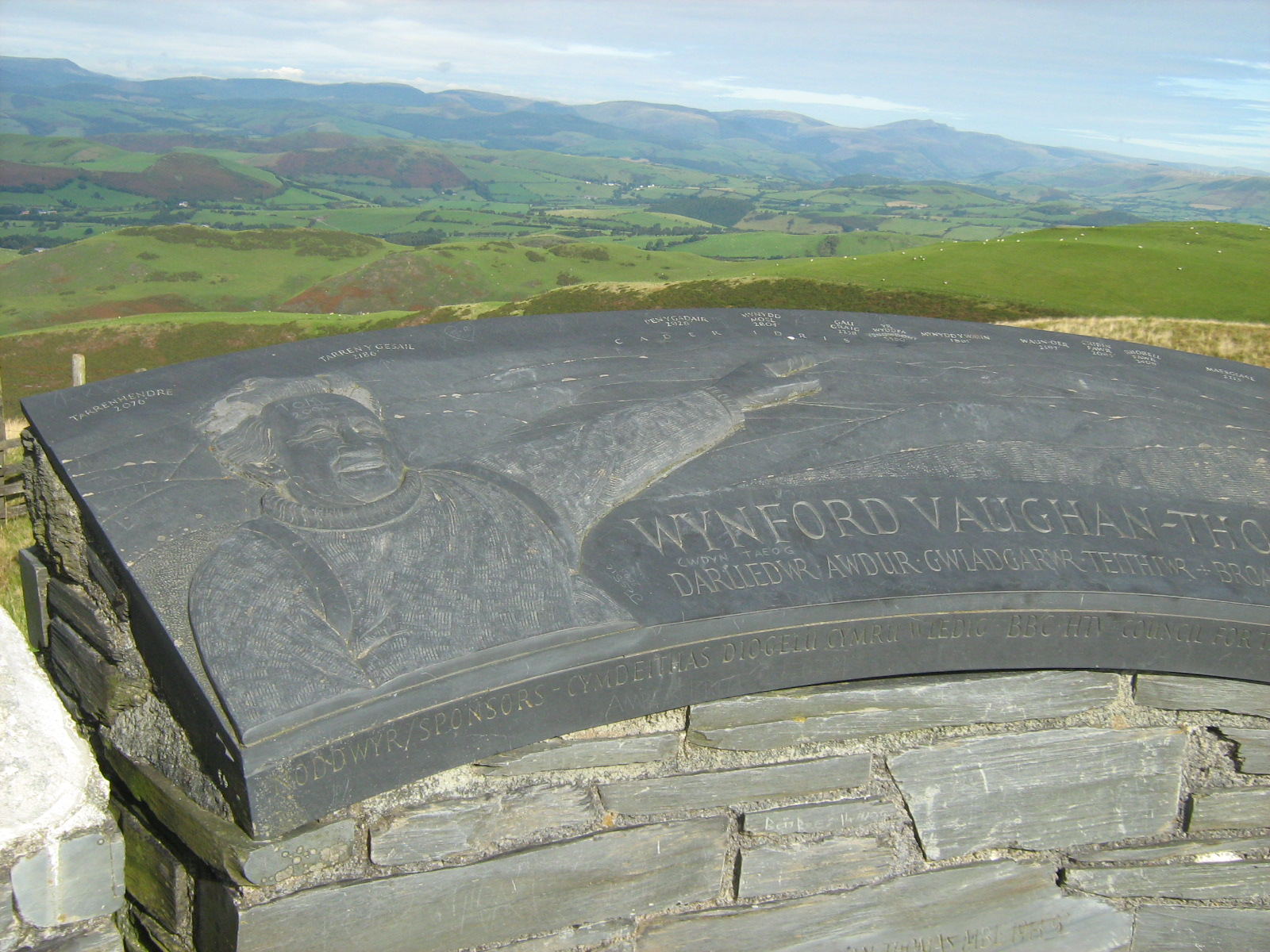
Memorial toposcope, Wynford Vaughan-Thomas pointing towards Snowdon

In 1990 a memorial was unveiled at the Cadair viewpoint (at 52.5489°N 3.7183°W) to the broadcaster and writer Wynford Vaughan-Thomas. It is a toposcope, looking out over the rolling hills and mountains, with a depiction of Vaughan-Thomas pointing towards Snowdon, Wales' highest peak, which is just visible on a clear day.

=== Internet issues ===
In September 2020 the BBC reported that the village had had serious issues with its broadband internet connectivity for the previous 18 months. BT Openreach engineers investigated the problem using a spectrum analyser and found that the issue was caused by a resident who was using an old television. After the TV was disposed of the issues ended.
