= Knucklas =

Coordinates: 52.361°N 3.1°W

Knucklas: Welsh: Cnwclas
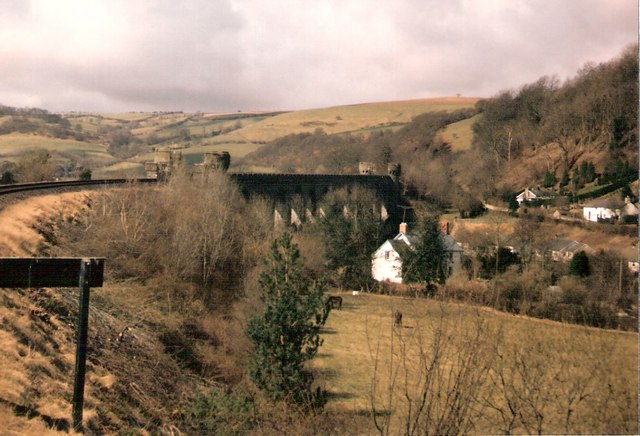
- Knucklas Viaduct, on the Heart of Wales Line, and the village of Knucklas beneath

- Location within Powys
- Population: 220
- OS grid reference: SO251742
- Community: Beguildy
- Principal area: Powys
- Preserved county: Powys
- Country: Wales
- Sovereign state: United Kingdom
- Post town: Knighton
- Postcode district: LD7
- Dialling code: 01547
- Police: Dyfed-Powys
- Fire: Mid and West Wales
- Ambulance: Welsh
- UK Parliament: Ceredigion Preseli
- Senedd Cymru – Welsh Parliament: Brecon & Radnorshire

Knucklas (Welsh: Cnwclas, meaning "green hillock") is a village in the community of Beguildy, in Powys, Wales, previously Radnorshire. It lies in the upper valley of the River Teme, just off the B4355 road and is served by Knucklas railway station on the Heart of Wales Line. It is approximately 2 miles (3.2 km) from the market town of Knighton.

== Notable landmarks ==
=== The Castle Mound ===
A protected ancient monument in the care of Knucklas Castle Community Land Project and listed by Cadw, it is the site of a castle believed to have been built by the Mortimers in about 1220–25. It consisted of a square stone keep with four round towers, sited on top of a steep hill. There is some evidence that there may have been further outer walls. It was captured by a Welsh army in 1262, which destroyed the defences.

Below the castle lies the battlefield of the Battle of Beguildy thought to have been fought between the Welsh and the Mortimer family of Norman Marcher Lords in 1146. The castle was attacked and destroyed by the forces of Owain Glyndŵr in 1402 during his rebellion. Whilst there is a romantic story associating the castle location with the marriage of Guinevere and King Arthur, this probably developed from an earlier story, which suggested that a marriage took place between Gwenhwyfar, the daughter of Ogrfan Gawr (also called 'Gogrfan Gawr "the Giant" of Castell y Cnwclas' – Knucklas Castle), and Arthur the warrior – there being no reference to Arthur as a king in the early Welsh texts.

=== The Viaduct ===
The spectacular 13-arch span was completed by the Central Wales Railway in 1865 and recorded in an engraving from the Illustrated London News.

=== Heyope ===
Three Bronze Age torcs were found here and declared treasure in 1991. They are now housed in the National Museum, Cardiff.

The parish church of St David was built in 1882, on the site of a medieval church. The font dates from the 15th century.

The longest-burning tyre fire in British history occurred in Heyope, lasting 13 years from 1989 to 2001.

=== Further reading ===
- Noble, F. (1955): "The Bronze Age gold torcs from Heyope". Transactions of the Radnorshire Society, 25, pp. 34–38.

== Notable people ==
- Vavasor Powell (1617–1670), Nonconformist Puritan preacher, evangelist, church leader and writer, who was imprisoned for his role in a plot to depose King Charles II.
- Malcolm Page (born 1947), former footballer with 350 club caps and 28 for Wales
