= HMS Heartsease =

Two ships of the Royal Navy have borne the name HMS Heartsease, after the common name for the wildflower Viola tricolor:

- English ship Heartsease (1652) was a 36-gun ship captured in 1652 and sold in 1656.
- HMS Heartsease (K15) was a Flower-class corvette, originally to have been named HMS Pansy. She was launched in 1940, transferred to the United States Navy in 1942 as USS Courage and returned in 1945. She was sold into civilian service in 1946 and was lost in 1958.
