= Llangynllo railway station =

Railway station in Powys, Wales

Llangynllo
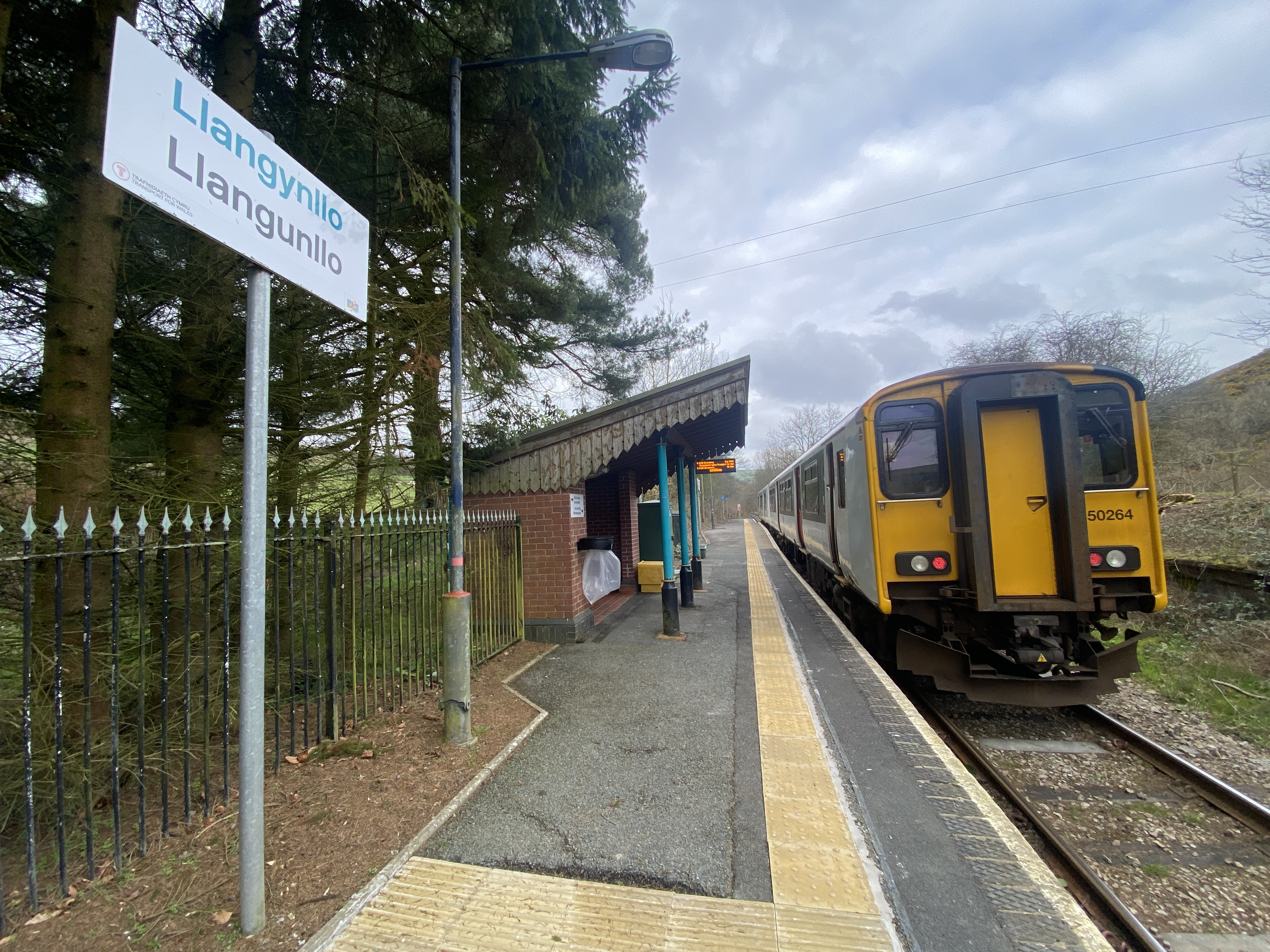

General information
- Location: Llangunllo, Powys; Wales
- Coordinates: 52°21′00″N 3°9′42″W
- Grid reference: SO209730
- Manager: Transport for Wales
- Platforms: 1

Other information
- Station code: LGO
- Classification: DfT category F2

History
- Opened: 1860s

Passengers
- 2021/22: ▲396
- 2022/23: ▲684
- 2023/24: ▲780
- 2024/25: ▼752
- 2025/26: ▼734
Location
Notes
- Passenger statistics from the Office of Rail and Road

Llangynllo railway station is a countryside railway station in Powys about 5 miles west of Knighton, on the Heart of Wales Line. The station is located 1.4 miles north of Llangunllo village (also known as Llangynllo), at road level beside one house and two cottages on a minor rural road off the B4356 road. It is between Llanbister Road and Knucklas, 18 miles 57 chains (30.1 km) from Craven Arms South Junction.

The highest point on the line (about 980 ft (299 m) above sea level) is a short distance to the north of the station, near to the southern portal of the 647 yd (592 m) long Llangynllo tunnel.

== History ==
The station opened in the mid-1860s, originally as 'Llangunllo', which was altered to its current spelling from 12 May 1980. Between September 1965 and May 1969, the station used the suffix 'Halt'. The former station house and railway cottage remain in situ, now in private use. The former second platform remains visible, although overgrown.

== Facilities ==
The station is unstaffed and has no ticketing provision, so all tickets must be purchased before travel or on the train. It has been fitted with a Customer Information display, payphone and customer help point in addition to the standard timetable poster board and waiting shelter. The platform is low, which has caused access issues for passengers in the past (a set of wooden steps was required to join or alight from modern stock) but an easy access ramp has since been fitted to help passengers when joining or leaving trains.

== Passenger volume ==
The station is among the least used stations in Wales; in the 2015/16 period, it was the third-least used, and in the 2016/17 period it was the second-least used. Most users of the station are walkers; due to the hill up to the station, residents may prefer to walk to neighbouring Llanbister Road.

Passenger volume at Llangynllo
	2004–05	2005–06	2006–07	2007–08	2008–09	2009–10	2010–11	2011–12	2012–13	2013–14	2014–15	2015–16	2016–17	2017–18	2018–19	2019–20	2020–21	2021–22	2022–23	2023–24	2024–25
Entries and exits	872	746	902	1,404	918	966	1,032	1,046	958	806	810	958	720	806	774	800	20	396	684	780	752

The statistics cover twelve month periods that start in April.

== Services ==
All trains serving the station are operated by Transport for Wales. There are five trains per day in each direction from Monday to Saturday and a sixth morning service to Shrewsbury for commuters on weekdays; two services call on Sundays. This is a request stop, where passengers have to signal to the driver to board or alight from the train.

Preceding station	National Rail	Following station
Llanbister Road	Transport for Wales; Heart of Wales Line	Knucklas

== Community rail ==
The station, along with all others on the line, is promoted by the Heart of Wales Community Rail Partnership.

== Bibliography ==
- Caton, Peter (2018). Remote Stations. Leicestershire: Matador. ISBN 978-1-78901-408-2.
- Organ, John (2008). Mitchell, Vic (ed.). Craven Arms to Llandeilo. West Sussex: Middleton Press. figs. 35-37. ISBN 9781906008352. OCLC 648080889.
- Quick, Michael (2023). Railway Passenger Stations in Great Britain: A Chronology (PDF) (5th ed.). London: Railway and Canal Historical Society.
