= Pengenffordd =

Village in Powys, Wales

Coordinates: 51.963°N 3.206°W

Pengenffordd: Welsh: Pengefnffordd
- Location within Powys
- OS grid reference: SO1730
  - Cardiff: 33 mi (53 km)
  - London: 135 mi (217 km)
- Community: Talgarth
- Principal area: Powys
- Country: Wales
- Sovereign state: United Kingdom
- Post town: BRECON
- Postcode district: LD3
- Dialling code: 01874
- Police: Dyfed-Powys
- Fire: Mid and West Wales
- Ambulance: Welsh
- UK Parliament: Brecon, Radnor and Cwm Tawe
- Senedd Cymru – Welsh Parliament: Brecon and Radnorshire

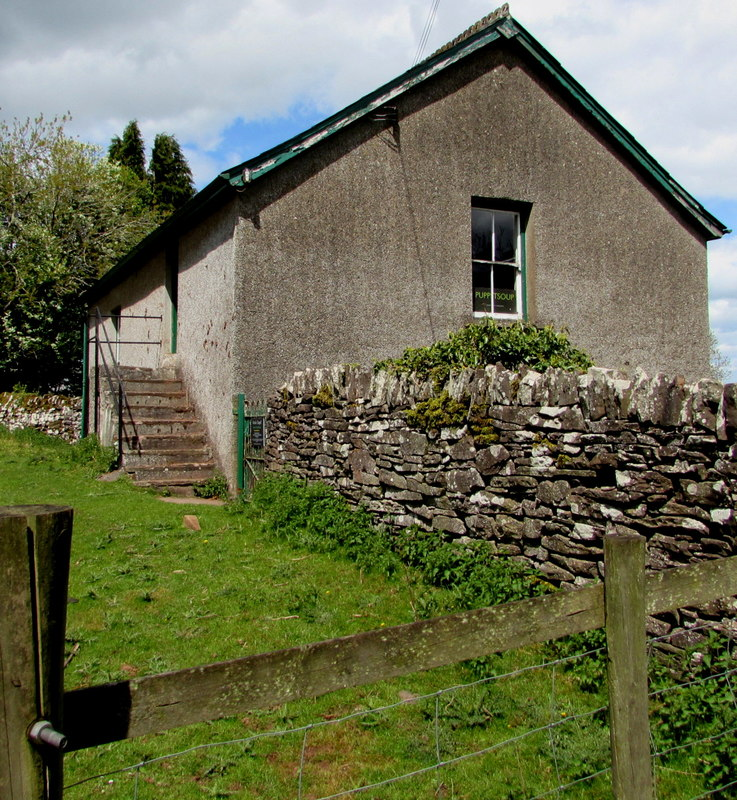
Steps up to rear of PuppetSoup, Pengenffordd, Powys

Pengenffordd is a hamlet located in the community of Talgarth, in the Brecknockshire area of south Powys. It is 33 miles (53 km) from Cardiff and 135 miles (217 km) from London.

The village is located approximately 8 miles (13 km) east of Brecon, on the slopes of the Black Mountains. It lies on the A479 road, between Talgarth to the north and Tretower to the south. The pub here is called the Dinas Castle Inn and is the starting point of the Dragon's Back walk. There is ample parking for a small fee.

== Politics ==
Pengenffordd is represented in the Senedd by James Evans of the Conservative Party and in the UK Parliament by David Chadwick of the Liberal Democrats.
