= Forge, Powys =

Coordinates: 52.58365°N 3.82699°W

Forge: Welsh: Y Bont-faen
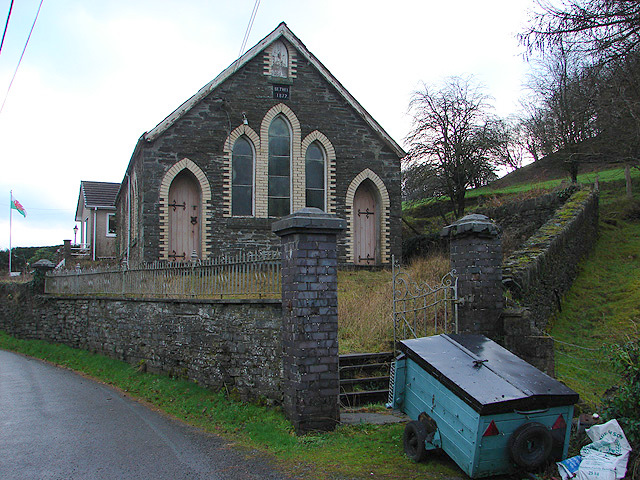
- Chapel at Forge

- Location within Powys
- OS grid reference: SN763999
- Community: Cadfarch
- Principal area: Powys
- Preserved county: Powys
- Country: Wales
- Sovereign state: United Kingdom
- Post town: MACHYNLLETH
- Postcode district: SY20
- Dialling code: 01654
- Police: Dyfed-Powys
- Fire: Mid and West Wales
- Ambulance: Welsh
- UK Parliament: Montgomeryshire and Glyndŵr

Forge (Welsh: Y Bont-faen) is a village in the county of Powys, Wales near to Machynlleth. It lies on the southern Afon Dulas on the mountain road to Dylife and Llanidloes.

It is in the community of Cadfarch.
