= Penegoes =

Coordinates: 52.5924°N 3.8079°W

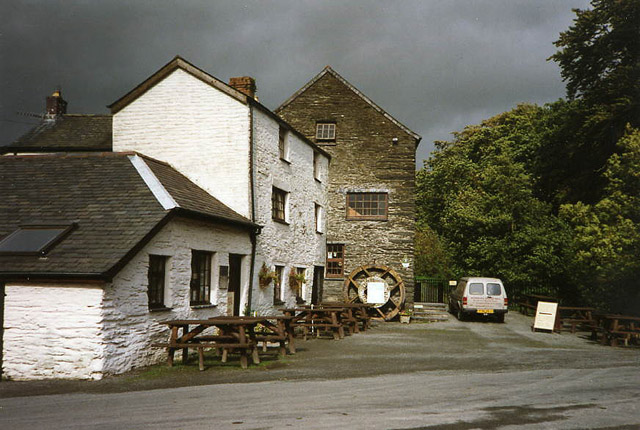
- Water mill in Penegoes

- Location within Powys
- Principal area: Powys
- Preserved county: Powys
- Country: Wales
- Sovereign state: United Kingdom
- Post town: Machynlleth
- Postcode district: SY20
- Dialling code: 01650
- Police: Dyfed-Powys
- Fire: Mid and West Wales
- Ambulance: Welsh
- UK Parliament: Montgomeryshire and Glyndŵr
- Senedd Cymru – Welsh Parliament: Montgomeryshire

Penegoes (Welsh pronunciation) is a village in Powys, Wales, between Cemmaes Road and Machynlleth, on the A489 road, and the primary settlement of the community of Cadfarch. Until 1987 Penegoes was a community itself.

The Afon Crewi, one of several streams feeding into Afon Dulas, itself a tributary of the Afon Dyfi, has created a fairly broad and flat valley. Penegoes church is on the level northernside of the valley with the ground sloping down gently to the stream. The church represents the focus of what is now a dispersed settlement. Only a single habitation, Llwyn, adjoins it but others lie off the main road at regular intervals to west and east.

The Welsh dedication of the church and the form of the oval churchyard suggests that it is of early medieval origin. St Cadfarch was reputedly a 6th-century saint and a disciple of St Illtyd.

The churchyard adopts an irregular form but has been extended at its west end where the original curvilinear course can still be detected as a scarp bank amidst the tightly packed graves. Two adjacent wells on the opposite side of the road to the church are reputed to have had curative properties, as reported by the Royal Commission at the beginning of the 20th century: Ffynnon Penegoes and Ffynnon Gadfarch. The rectory and its outbuildings are dated to the late 18th or early 19th century and have a Grade II listing. Reputedly they are on the site of an earlier rectory where the landscape painter, Richard Wilson RA (1714–1782), was born. Llawr-Penegoes, 250m east of the church.

== Plas Dolguog ==
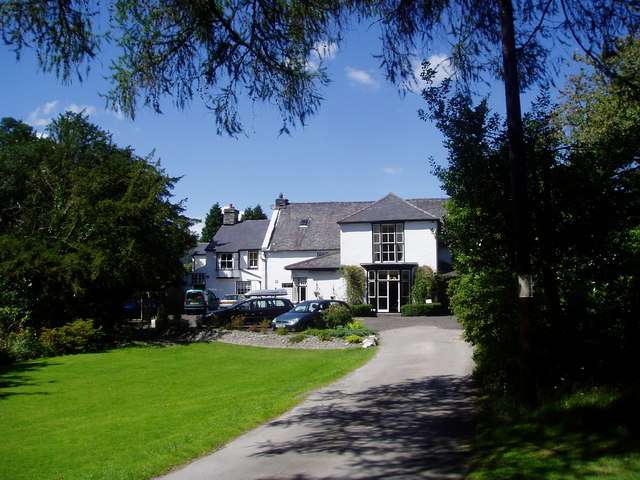
Plas Dolguog Hotel

Plas Dolguog, an early 17th-century manor house, with Victorian extensions, now a hotel. The house was built in 1632 for the Herbert family. It is now a country house hotel.
