= Heartsease, Llanddewi Ystradenni =

Coordinates: 52.3175°N 3.2703°W

Heartsease
- Location within Powys
- Population: <100
- OS grid reference: SO134696
- Principal area: Powys
- Preserved county: Powys
- Country: Wales
- Sovereign state: United Kingdom
- Post town: Llandrindod Wells
- Postcode district: LD1
- Dialling code: 01597
- Police: Dyfed-Powys
- Fire: Mid and West Wales
- Ambulance: Welsh
- UK Parliament: Brecon, Radnor and Cwm Tawe

Heartsease is a small settlement or hamlet in the parish and community of Llanddewi Ystradenni in Powys, Wales. It should not be confused with Heartsease near Knighton.

It lies in the historic county of Radnorshire and was formerly part of the cantref of Maelienydd.

Heartsease has a chapel with a cemetery belonging to the Presbyterian Church of Wales.
