= Llangunllo =

Village in Powys, Wales

- Village and community
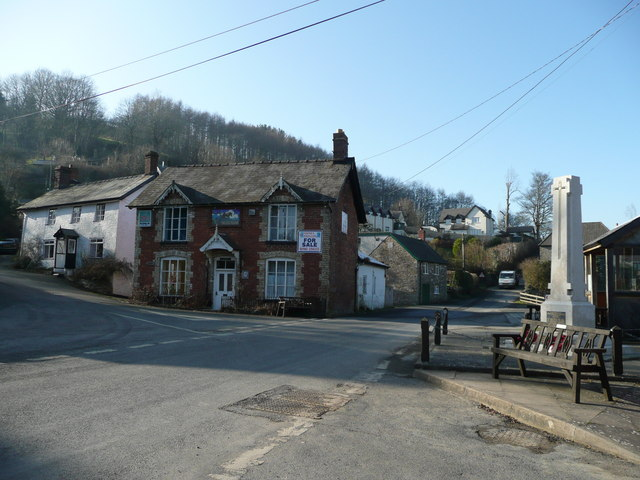
- Village centre

- Location within Powys
- Population: 369 (2011)
- OS grid reference: SO211713
- Community: Llangunllo
- Principal area: Powys
- Preserved county: Powys
- Country: Wales
- Sovereign state: United Kingdom
- Post town: Knighton
- Postcode district: LD7
- Dialling code: 01547
- Police: Dyfed-Powys
- Fire: Mid and West Wales
- Ambulance: Welsh
- UK Parliament: Brecon, Radnor and Cwm Tawe
- Senedd Cymru – Welsh Parliament: Brecon & Radnorshire
- List of places UK Wales Powys 52.3346°N 3.1585°W Community map: Map of the community

Llangunllo (sometimes Llangynllo; Welsh pronunciation) is a village and community in central Powys (formerly in Radnorshire), Wales, located about 5 miles west of Knighton. It is named after St Cynllo. The population of the community at the 2011 census was 369.

It is served by Llangynllo railway station.

== Governance ==
Llangunllo & Bleddfa Community Council represents residents' interests. It comprises seven community councillors elected from Llangunllo and Bleddfa villages.

An electoral ward in the same name exists, which also includes neighbouring communities. This ward had a population of 1,255 at the 2011 Census.

Images by Percy Benzie Abery

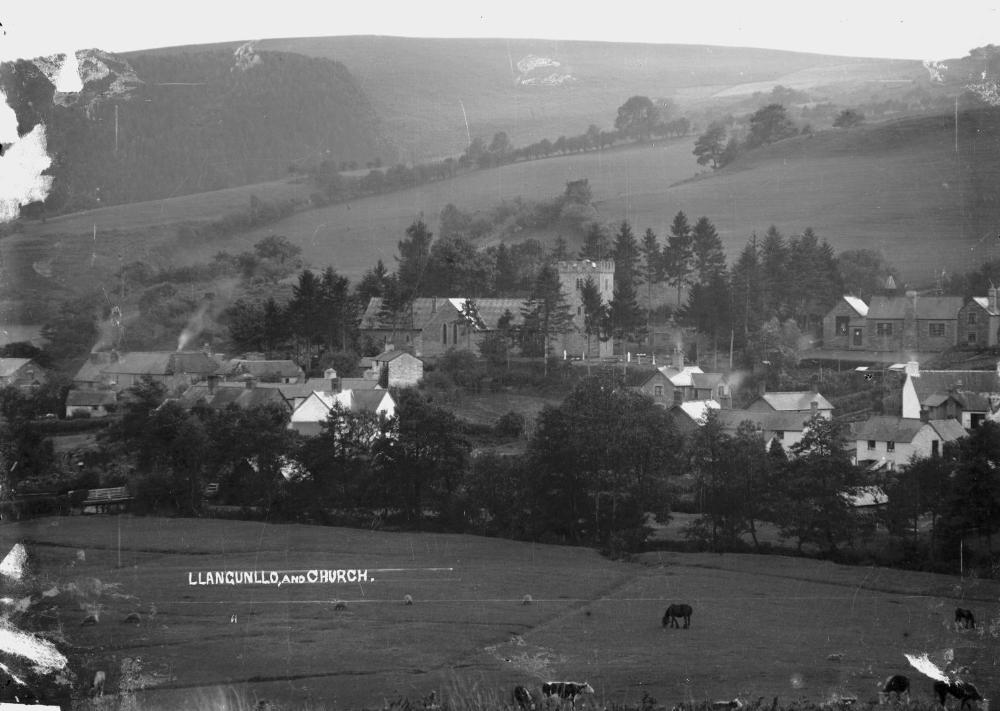
Village and church

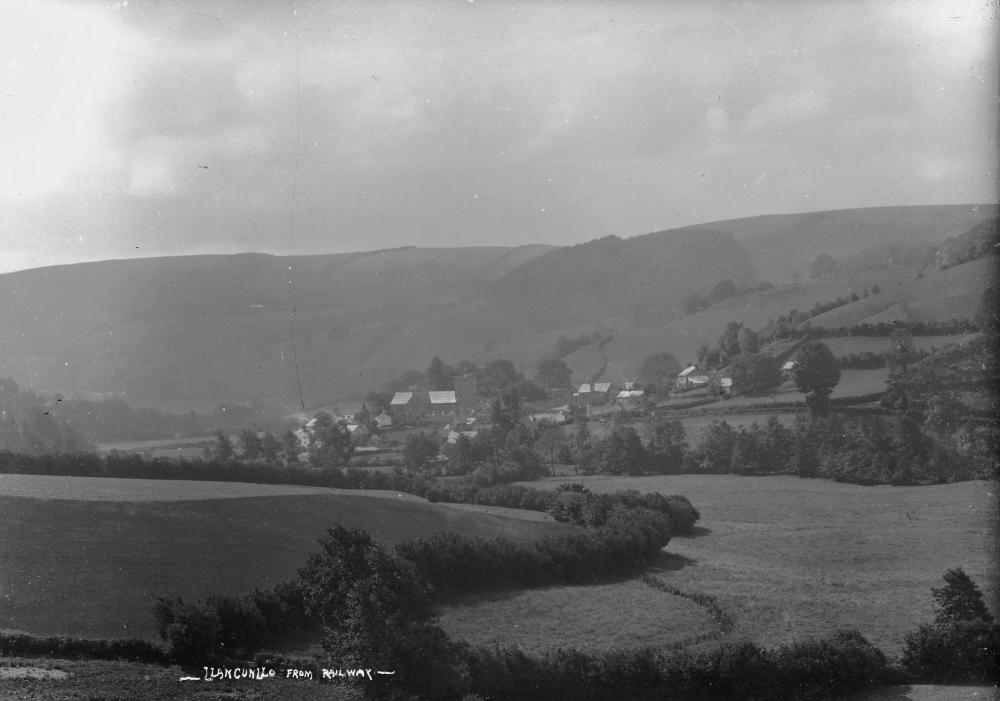
Llangynllo from railway

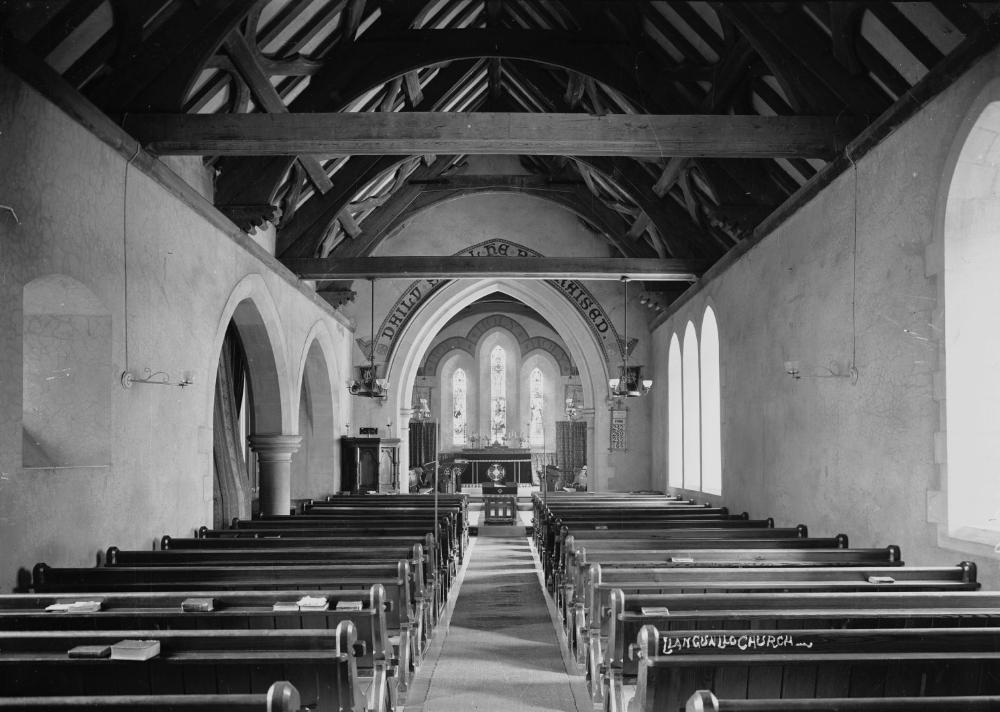
Church

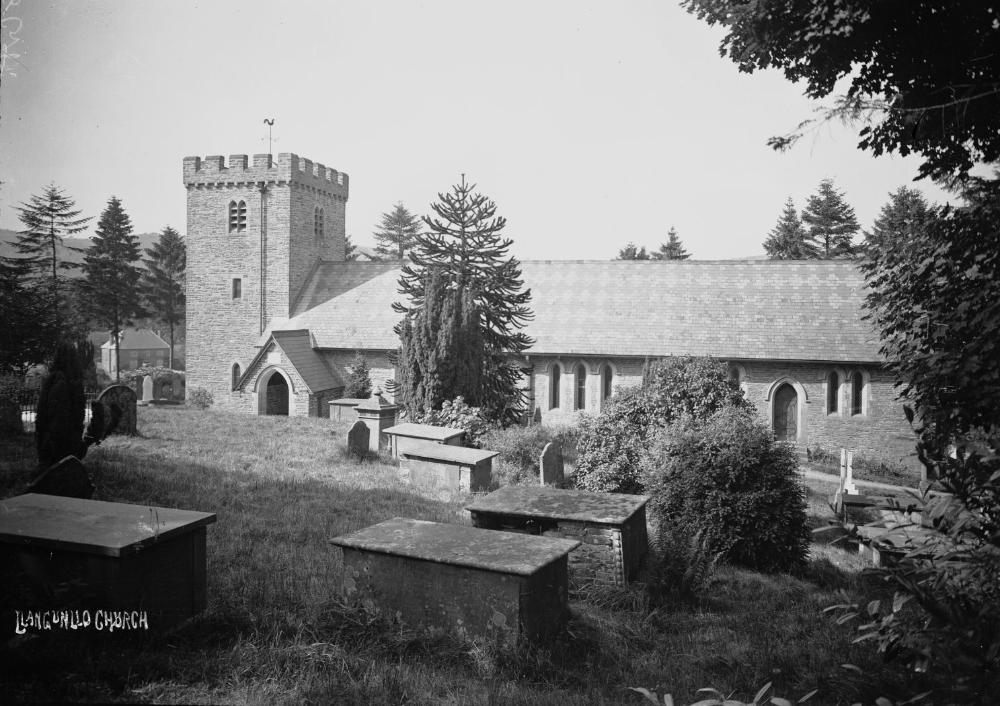
Church

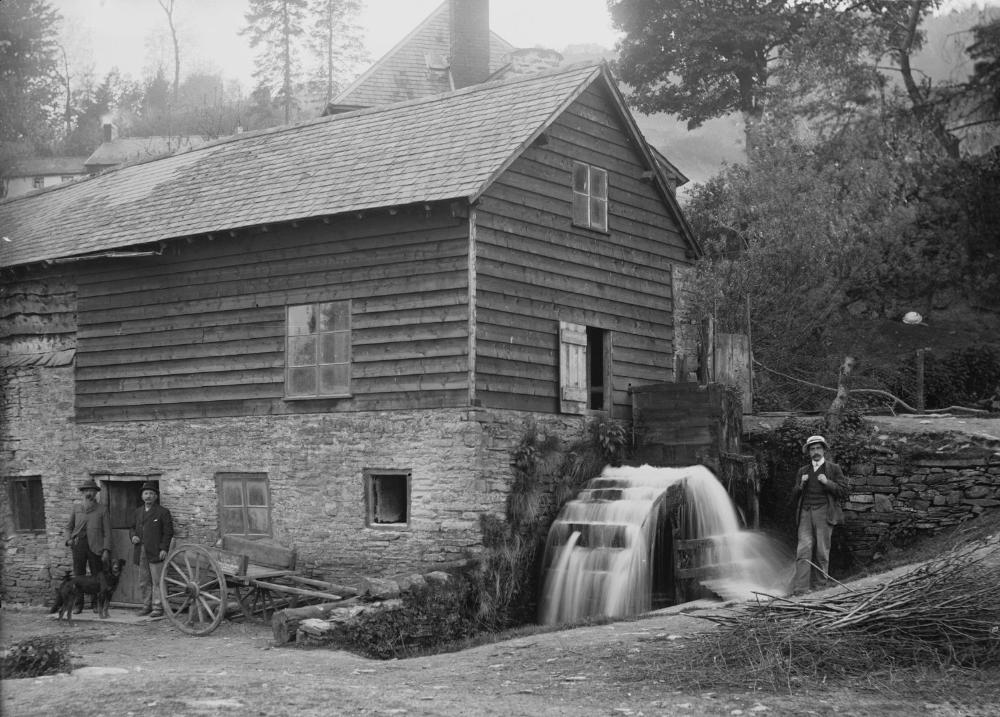
Mill
