= Llawryglyn =

Village in the county of Powys, Wales

Coordinates: 52.5085°N 3.5753°W

Llawr y Glyn (or Llawryglyn) is a hamlet in Powys, Wales. It lies about 10 miles west of the town of Newtown, in the historic county of Montgomeryshire. It has changed very little over the passage of time, as it is primarily an agricultural community.
