= Elias Owen (priest) =

Welsh cleric and antiquarian

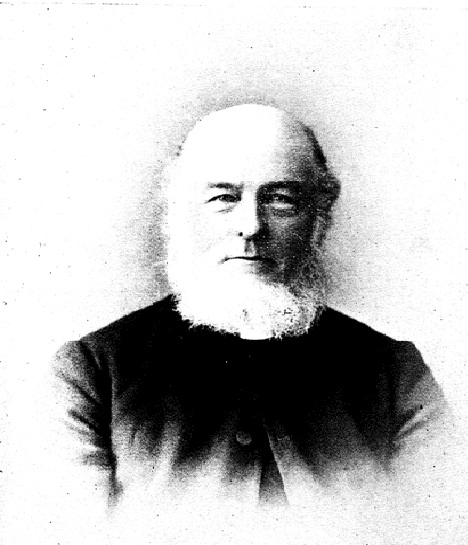
- Rev. Elias Owen (1833–1899)
- Born: 2 December 1833; Montgomeryshire, Wales
- Died: 19 May 1899 (aged 65); Llanyblodwel, England
- Education: Culham College; Trinity College, Dublin
- Spouse: Margaret Pierce (m. 1858)
- Children: 13, including William and Elias
- Relatives: Morgan Morgan-Owen (nephew); Hugh Morgan-Owen (nephew)

Rev. Elias Owen MA, F.S.A. (2 December 1833 – 19 May 1899) was a Welsh cleric and antiquarian whose works include The Old Stone Crosses of the Vale of Clwyd, 1886 and Welsh Folk-Lore, 1896.

== Family ==
Owen was born in Montgomeryshire, probably in the village of Llandysilio, the third child and eldest son of James Owen (ca.1806–1886) and Susannah Morgan (1805–1868). His father was a farmer and one of the first 12 constables in the Montgomeryshire Constabulary. James Owen was the father of at least 15 children, nine by his first wife, Susannah, and five by his second wife, Mary Morris (ca.1848–ca.1921).

Elias Owen married Margaret Pierce (1839–fl.1901) on 2 August 1858 at St. David's Church, the Welsh chapel in Brownlow Hill, Liverpool; she was the daughter of Eleanor and William Pierce, a quarryman. They had 13 children:

- Edwin James Owen (1859–1928), who became the vicar at Brithdir, near Dolgelly, Merionethshire.
- William Pierce Owen (1860–1937), who played international football for Wales, making 12 appearances and scoring six goals. He later became a solicitor in Aberystwyth.
- Elias Owen (1863–1888), who was the Welsh goalkeeper for three matches in 1884. He took his own life, aged 25.
- Thomas Edward Owen (1865–1932), who became the vicar at Aberdaron, Caernarvonshire and then Blaenau Ffestiniog, Merionethshire.
- Mary Owen (1866–NK), who emigrated to Australia or New Zealand.
- Susan Ellen Owen (1868–1940), who married William Greengrass who became headmaster at a school in Shoreditch, London.
- Margaret Ellen Owen (1870–1924), who married John James Jones who became curate at Pwllheli and then at St. Mary's, Bangor, Caernarvonshire.
- Lizzie Owen (1872–NK), who married Edward Wilde, a farmer of Westbury, Shropshire.
- Myfanwy Owen (1877–1967), who married Albert Moss, a Cunard ship's steward.
- Gwen Lily Owen (1879–1969), who married David Williams, a merchant who later operated a bus and coach company in Bethesda, Caernarvonshire.
- Sarah Louisa Owen (1881–1975), who married Arthur Harris, who was employed by the electricity board in Coventry.
- Enid Owen (1882–NK), about whom little is known.
- John Lowry Morgan Owen (1884–NK), who emigrated to Chile as a missionary.

== Education ==
Places associated with Elias Owen

By the time he was six years old, the Owen family had settled in Llanidloes, about 35 miles south-west of Llandysilio. He attended the National School at Llanidloes, becoming a pupil-teacher; his occupation was given as such in the 1851 census, when he was aged 17 and living with his parents at Club Buildings, Lower Green, Llanidloes. He won a scholarship to the Oxford Diocesan Training College for Schoolmasters at Culham, about eight miles south of Oxford, from where he qualified with first-class honours.

In October 1868, he enrolled at Trinity College, Dublin, graduating with a BA in June 1871 and being awarded an MA in the spring of 1878. At this time, students were not required to attend lectures at the college and needed only to sit the end of term examinations; such students became known as "steamboat men". Owen is said to have "carried off many prizes, more especially in divinity".

== Teaching career ==
Owen's only teaching appointment was as headmaster of the National School at Llanllechid, near Bangor.

Owen lived at Llanllechid from the mid-1850s until 1871; during this time, he first developed his interest in antiquarian research. Together with the local vicar, John Evans, he explored the local mountains and mapped a Roman encampment on Moel Faban, on the lower slopes of Foel-fras. He subsequently created a map of the whole parish which was published in 1866 in the North Wales Chronicle and later, in a more elaborate form, in Archaeologia Cambrensis. His explorations and maps were referred to in an article by Col. Augustus Lane Fox published in the 1870 Journal of the Ethnological Society. In 2005, researchers from the nearby Moelyci Environmental Centre made use of Owen's map during investigations into local hill-fort sites.

== Clerical career ==
Owen was ordained as a deacon by the Bishop of Bangor in 1871, and in 1872 he was ordained as a priest. From 1871 until 1875, he was curate at St. Gwynnog's church, Llanwnnog, near Caersws. Also resident in Caersws at this time was the poet John Ceiriog Hughes, who had been stationmaster at Llanidloes between 1865 and 1870 before, in 1871, becoming station-master at Caersws and superintendent of the newly opened line from Caersws to the Van lead mines. Hughes was buried in St. Gwynnog graveyard in 1887.

In 1875, Owen was appointed to the curacy of Holy Trinity Church, Oswestry, for a year before being appointed Diocesan Inspector of Schools for St. Asaph. While serving as an inspector, he lived in Llanfwrog near Ruthin, Denbighshire. From 1881 he was vicar of St. Michael's church at nearby Efenechtyd but continued to be an inspector, before giving up both roles in 1892 when he became vicar of Llanyblodwel, in Shropshire.

On resigning his post as Diocesan Inspector, the local clergy and school managers presented him with an illuminated address, which had a photograph of St. Asaph cathedral at the head, a view of the parish church at Efenechtyd at the foot, and Owen's portrait in the margin. The teachers and parents also presented him with an address. According to The North Wales Chronicle:

Both addresses pay a touching tribute to the sincerity with which Mr. Owen carried out his work, and speak of the esteem in which he was held. . . Mr. Owen as an antiquary and author enjoyed an extensive and well-deserved reputation.

At Llanyblodwel, Owen became vicar at the church of St. Michael the Archangel, which had been rebuilt in 1855 to designs by its then-vicar, Rev. John Parker. Owen oversaw the addition of half an acre to the churchyard on land donated by the Earl of Bradford. He also enlarged the school at Porth-y-waen by converting the schoolmaster's house into an extra classroom.

== Welsh Folk-Lore ==
During his years as a school inspector, Owen travelled throughout the diocese visiting and inspecting schools. As explained in the preface to Welsh Folk-Lore:

It was his custom, after the labour of school inspection was over, to ask the clergy with whom he was staying to accompany him to the most aged inhabitants of their parish. This they willingly did, and often in the dark winter evenings, lantern in hand, they sallied forth on their journey, and in this way a rich deposit of traditions and superstitions was struck and rescued from oblivion.

In this way he collected a vast amount of material which he was able to supplement with material supplied by his brother Elijah, who was a vicar in Anglesey, and several other churchmen. This material was assembled by Owen and formed the basis of an essay he presented to the 1887 Welsh National Eisteddfod, held in London. The essay won a prize of a silver medal and £20. The essay was later revised and published under the title Welsh Folk-Lore. A Collection of the Folk-Tales and Legends of North Wales in 1896. The cost of the publication was funded by nearly 200 subscribers.

The book opens with a long description of The Origin of the Fairies or "Y Tylwyth Teg", explaining that the name means "the Fair Tribe", who were "spoken of as a people, and not as myths or goblins, and . . . are said to be a fair or handsome race." (p. 3)

Among the other stories recounted in the collection are those of:

- Y Fuwch Frech ("The Speckled Cow") which was said to give milk to "any one. . . in want of milk" until a witch milked the cow dry. The cow then left, plunging into a lake together with her two children. (p. 130)
- Gwrach y Rhibyn ("Hag of the Mist") who was supposed to reside in the dripping fog, but was seldom, if ever seen. It was believed that her shriek foretold misfortune, if not death, to the hearer. (p. 142)
- Angelystor ("Recording Angel") an ancient and malign spirit who inhabited the church yard of Llangernyw. Every year, at Halloween its voice could be heard foretelling the names of parishioners who were to die the following year. One Halloween, a local man, Siôn Ap Rhobert, challenged the existence of the spirit only to hear his own name called out. He died within the year. (p. 171)
- The "wicked Ghost" which haunted the rectory at Llandegla and was eventually exorcised by a man named Griffiths from Graianrhyd. The spirit was said to have been buried in a box under a large stone in the River Alyn close to Llandegla's bridge. (p. 199)

== Other activities ==
Owen was a member of the Powysland Club, serving on its committee for some time. He was joint-editor and a regular contributor to the society's journal, The Montgomeryshire Collections between 1871 and 1899. The club had been founded in 1867 as a society of antiquarians from the Welshpool area.

In 1886, he published his major single volume work, The Old Stone Crosses of the Vale of Clwyd. In the preface, Owen explained the background to his works:

Wales teems with folklore of great variety and interest, and in the grave of the aged, as one after the other leave us, is buried for ever some tale of by-gone days, which we wish had been retained. The writer hopes that he has rescued a few of these tales from oblivion.

Owen also edited The Works of the Rev. Griffith Edwards published in 1895. Edwards (also known as "Gutyn Padarn") was a fellow graduate of Trinity College, Dublin who became curate at Minera, Denbighshire and then rector of Llangadfan, Montgomeryshire. His literary works included poetry in Welsh and English and numerous articles in periodicals.

He was also elected a Fellow of the Society of Antiquaries of London.

== Death ==
Owen died on 19 May 1899, aged 65; he was at work in his smoking room at Llanyblodwel on The Holy Wells of North Wales when he collapsed; by the time a doctor had arrived, he had died without regaining consciousness. At the inquest, the cause of death was found to be a cerebral haemorrhage, or "apoplexy", probably a stroke.

Owen is commemorated in the church of St. Michael the Archangel at Llanyblodwel with a stained glass window of the Good Shepherd and St Michael; underneath the window is a brass plaque with the inscription:

To the glory of God and in memory of Elias Owen MA, FSA, vicar of this parish 1892–98, Diocesan Inspector of Schools 1876–1892, author of The Old Stone Crosses of the Vale of Clwyd and Welsh Folk Lore &c. This window and tablet are dedicated by his many friends in this diocese.

His gravestone bears the inscription: "We all do fade as a leaf".(Isaiah 64:6)
