= Elias Owen =

Elias Owen may refer to:

- Elias Owen (footballer) (1863–1888), Welsh amateur footballer
- Elias Owen (priest) (1833–1899), Welsh cleric and antiquarian
- Elias K. Owen (1834–1877), United States Navy officer
