= Stephen W. Williams =

Architect and civil engineer (1837–1899)

Stephen William Williams
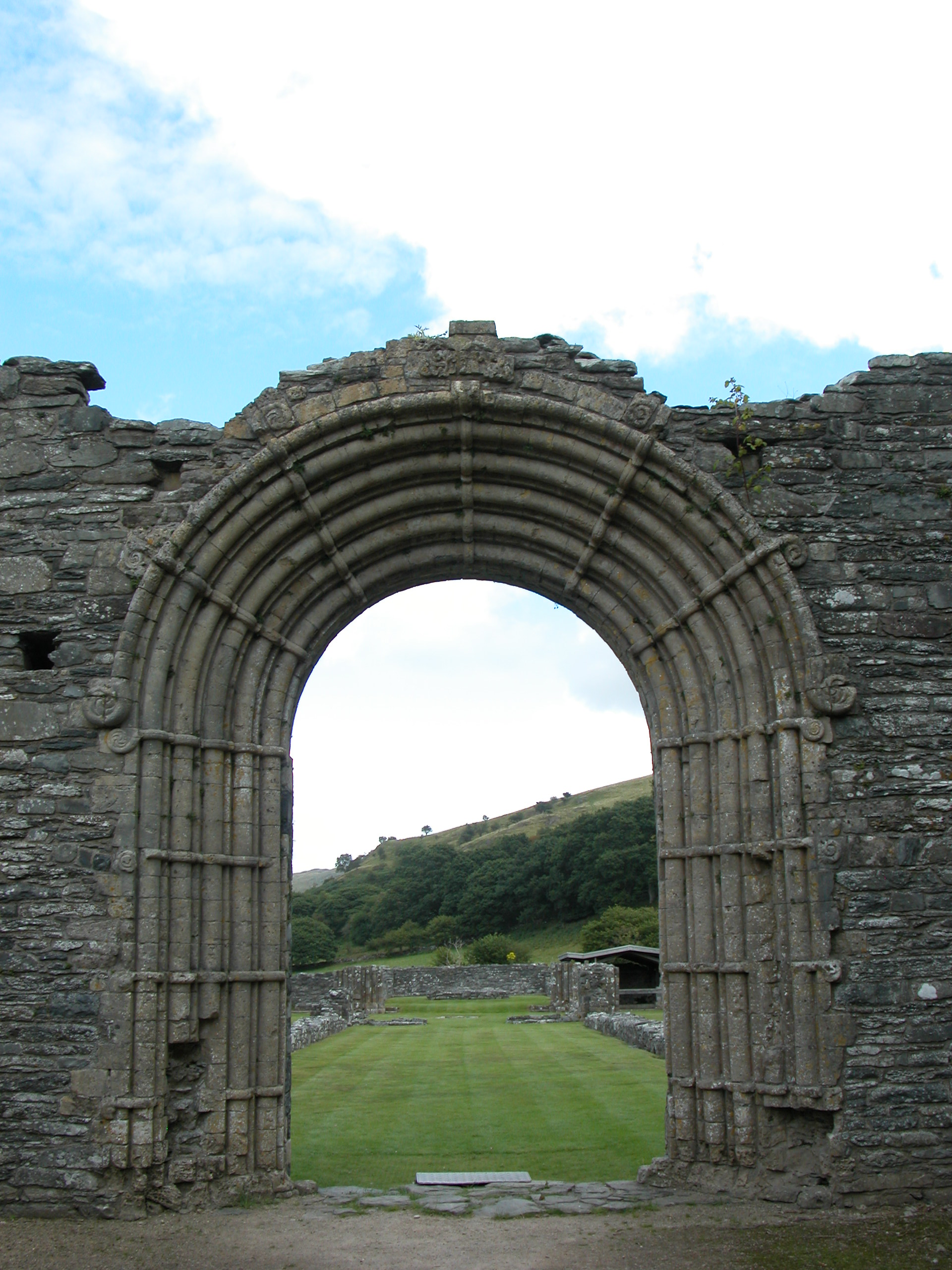
- The Norman Arch at Strata Florida
- Born: 1837; Mellington, Montgomeryshire
- Died: 11 December 1899 (aged 61–62); Sandown, Isle of Wight
- Education: Stoke on Trent School of Art and Government School of Mines
- Occupation: Architect
- Buildings: Buckland Hall, Brecknockshire.
- Projects: The laying out of Llandrindod Wells. The Elam Valley Estates acquisition for the Birmingham Water Company.

Stephen William Williams (1837–1899) was a civil engineer and architect who worked mainly in Radnorshire and Brecknockshire, Wales. He was county surveyor of Radnorshire from 1864 to 1899. He had offices at Rhayader and lived at Penralley House, Rhayader, He became a noted authority on the archaeology of the Cistercian Monasteries in Wales and undertook excavations at Strata Florida Abbey in Ceredigion, Abbey Cwm Hir in Radnorshire and Strata Marcella near Welshpool in Montgomeryshire. He was appointed High Sheriff of Radnorshire in 1899.

== Career ==
He was originally articled in 1852 to Samuel Bate of Trent Vale from November 1852 for five years. He was then employed as an engineer by a Mr Atkinson who was a sub-contractor to Benjamin Piercy and between 1858 and 1861 he was an engineer on the Vale of Clwyd Railway. He also worked as an assistant engineer on the Oswestry and Newtown Railway. It is suggested by Scourfield that Williams may have been responsible for the design of Welshpool railway station, which was completed in 1862.

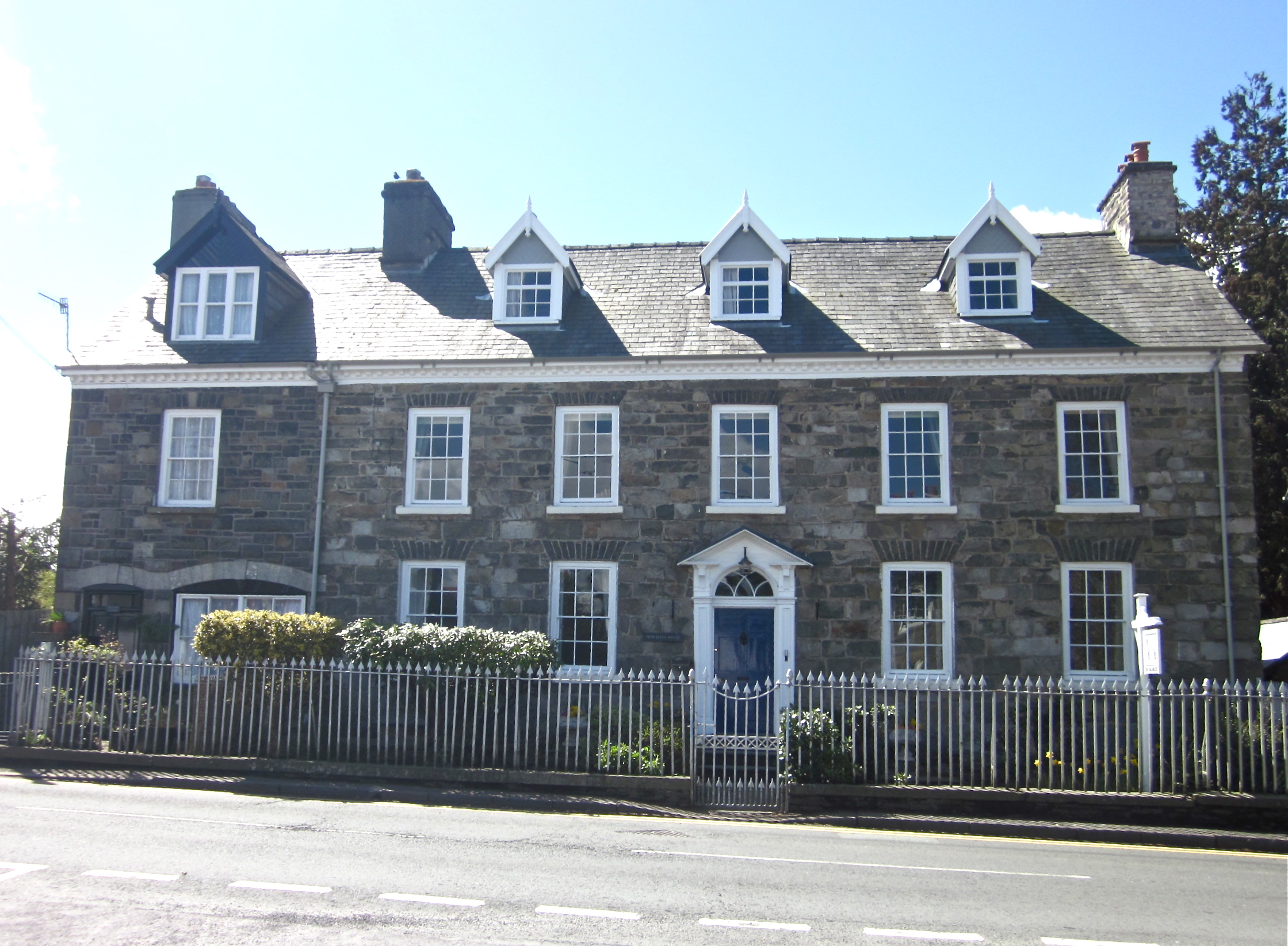
Penrally House, South Street, Rhayader, home of S W Williams

In March 1861 he set up his own architectural practice in Rhayader. At this period he continued to undertake railway survey work in Wales and in parts of England In 1864 he was appointed county surveyor for Radnorshire. He was elected a FRIBA in 1886 and a Fellow of the Society of Antiquaries of London (FSA) in 1890. He became company secretary and Surveyor for the Llandrindod Estate and Building Company. He was a man of wide interests and joined the 1st Herefordshire Rifle Volunteers in 1878. He set up the Rhayader Company of the Volunteers, with the rank of Captain and eventually he became Lieutenant Colonel in command of the entire battalion. In 1899 (the year of his death) he was the High Sheriff of Radnorshire.

== Land surveying and civil engineering ==
Williams supplemented his salary of £100 a year as Radnorshire county surveyor by undertaking work as a land surveyor and estate agent. This included work on enclosure awards. One of the largest awards was the '’Swydd Neithon'’, which enclosed the Llandrindod and Cefnllys commons and made available the land on which the new town of Llandrindod Wells was to be built. The contacts he made led to further work as a surveyor and agent with local estates. He surveyed the Gogerddan and Rhydoldog estates and was the agent for the Llysdinam estate where Francis Kilvert was a regular guest.

== The Elan Valley Reservoirs ==
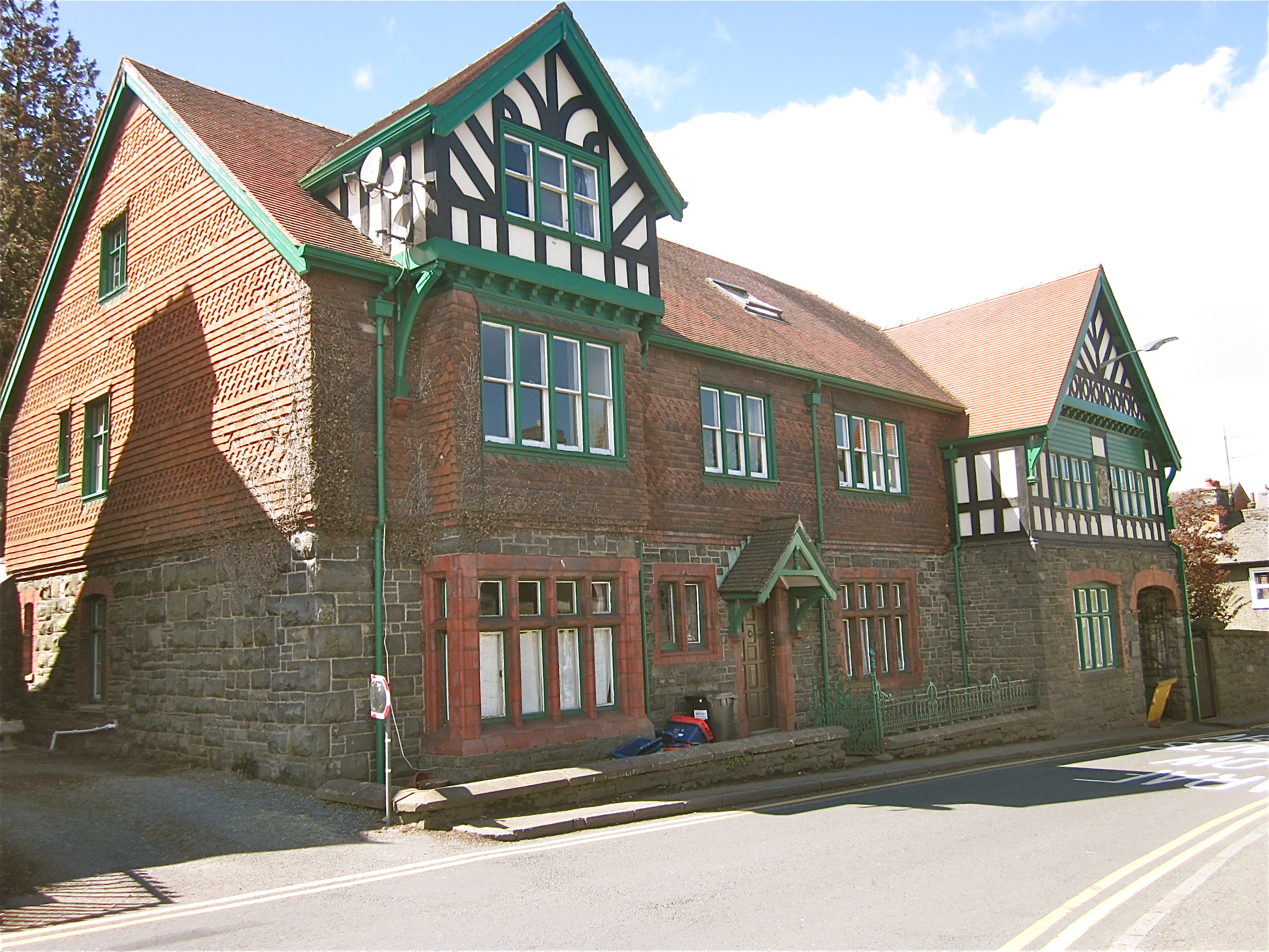
Bryniargo House, Rhayader 1893. Built as offices for the Elan Valley Reservoir project

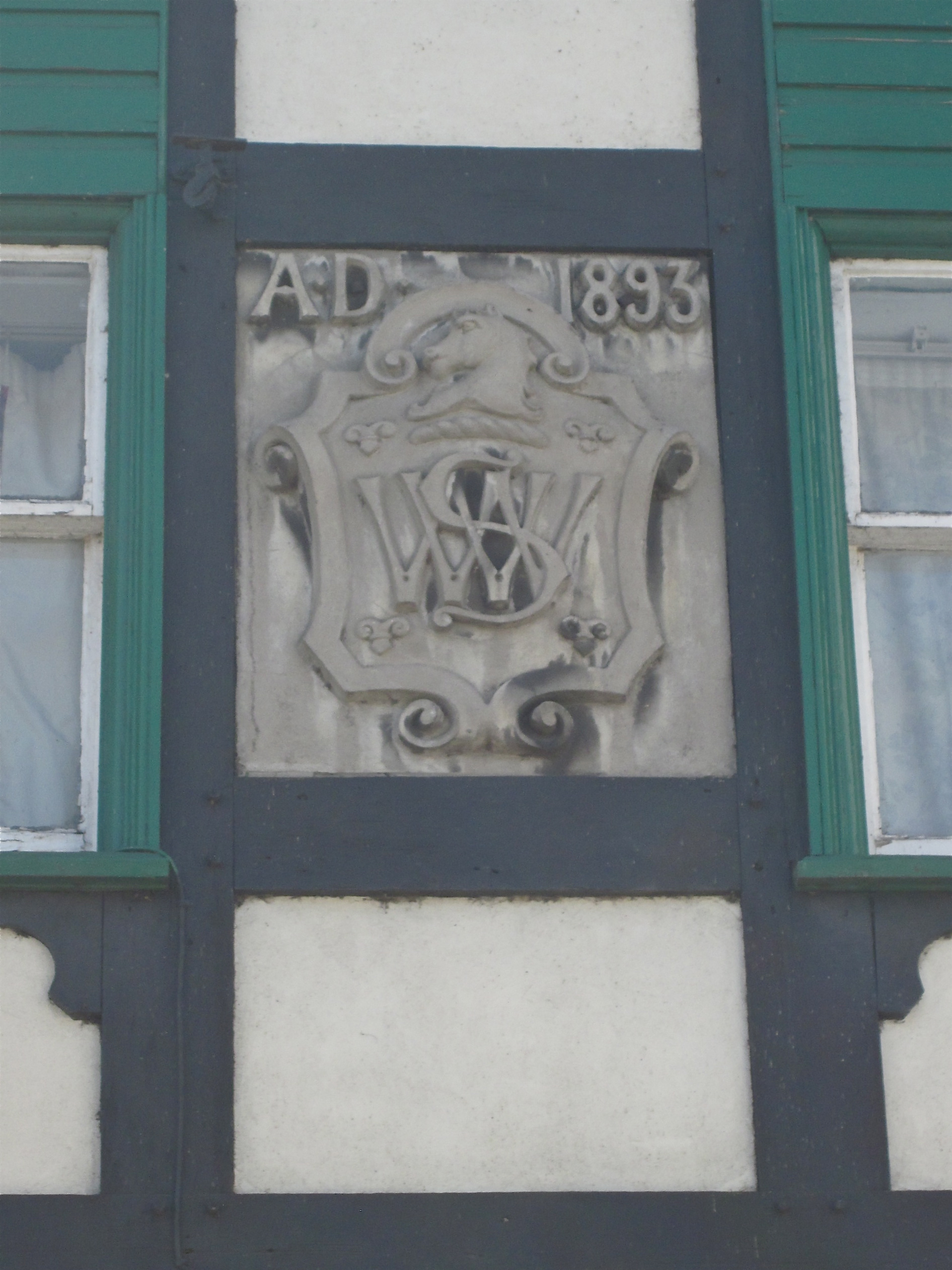
Bryniargo House, Rhayader.with Stephen Williams initials.

In 1892 the Birmingham Corporation Water Act was passed which gave the Birmingham City Council powers to compulsorily purchase land in the Elan Valley close to Rhayader, for the construction of dams for a water supply for the city. Birmingham Corporation had appointed the engineer, James Mansergh, to oversee the project but he needed someone to plan and build the workers' village. In October 1892 Williams was requested to value various estates by the Birmingham Town Clerk and in May 1893 he was appointed Elan Valley Estate Agent by the City Council. This involved the management of 45,000 acres of land and he was also involved in the delicate negotiations over land leases, dealing fairly and discreetly with local tenants, many of whom lost their lands as a result of building the reservoirs. In these matters he was to work closely with James Mansergh, who referred to him as 'our ubiquitous friend'

== The Development of Llandrindod Wells ==
A major scheme in which Williams was involved was the planning and laying out of Llandrindod after the '’Swydd Neithon'’ was enclosed in 1862. The development and layout of the town then proceeded in two parts. Lands owned by Richard Green Price was surveyed and laid out by Williams around Rock park, while the Pump House Estate to the east was laid out by Thomas Nicholson. Apart from William's designs for shops and houses, his work also included;

- Town Hall, Temple Street
- Station Crescent Terrace
- Market Hall (later destroyed by fire)
- Hotel Commodore. Originally built as the Rectory for Archdeacon de Winton in 1882–4. Multi-gabled and tile hung. Converted to a hotel in 1896

== Interest in archaeology and the Cistercian Order ==
William's attended his first meeting of the Cambrian Archaeological Association at Welshpool in 1857 at the age of 20. He had fairly diverse interests which included Numismatics, arms and armour, the study of monumental effigies in churches and he contributed an article about Roman finds at Kenchester in Herefordshire. Shortly before his death in 1899, Williams, as High Sheriff of Radnorshire, was instrumental in holding a groundbreaking treasure trove proceedings on the hoard of late Iron Age or Roman gold bracelets and a ring that were found at Carreg Gwynion, Nantmel near Rhayader. The hoard was declared treasure trove and is now in the collections of the British Museum, but Williams at the time made a plea for the foundation of a National Museum for Wales., which could house such discoveries in future. It was the Cistercian Abbeys of Wales that were to become his main interest and he has been described as the 'father of Cistercian archaeology in Wales' To assist him with his Excavations he employed his architectural assistant, Telfer Smith as clerk of Works and Worthington George Smith to act as an architectural draughtsman. Worthington Smith was both a distinguished botanical illustrator and a leading Palaeolithic archaeologist.

=== Strata Florida ===
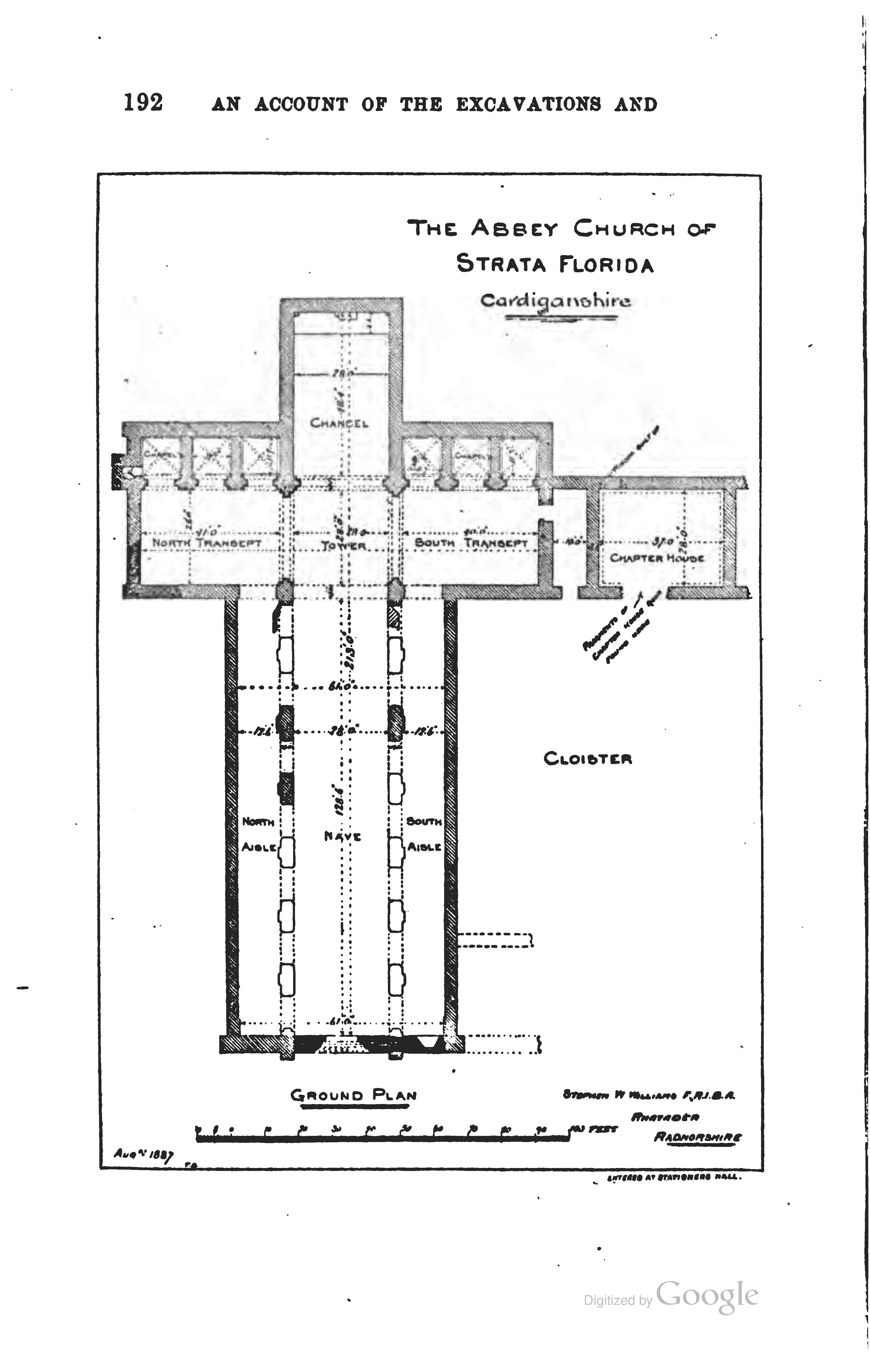
The Cistercian Abbey of Strata Florida-Plan of Abbey Church

Encouraged by the Cambrian Archaeological Association, Williams conducted two seasons of clearance and digging in 1887 and 1888, with a short season of excavation in 1890. The Cambrian Archaeological Society had taken Strata Florida Abbey into guardianship and wished to display it for the public. William's plans were the first accurate survey of the Abbey and in 1889 he published The Cistercian Abbey of Strata Florida: Its History, and an Account of the Recent Excavations Made on Its Site.. This was a history of the Abbey and description of the excavation, which set new standards for a publication about the Cistercians.

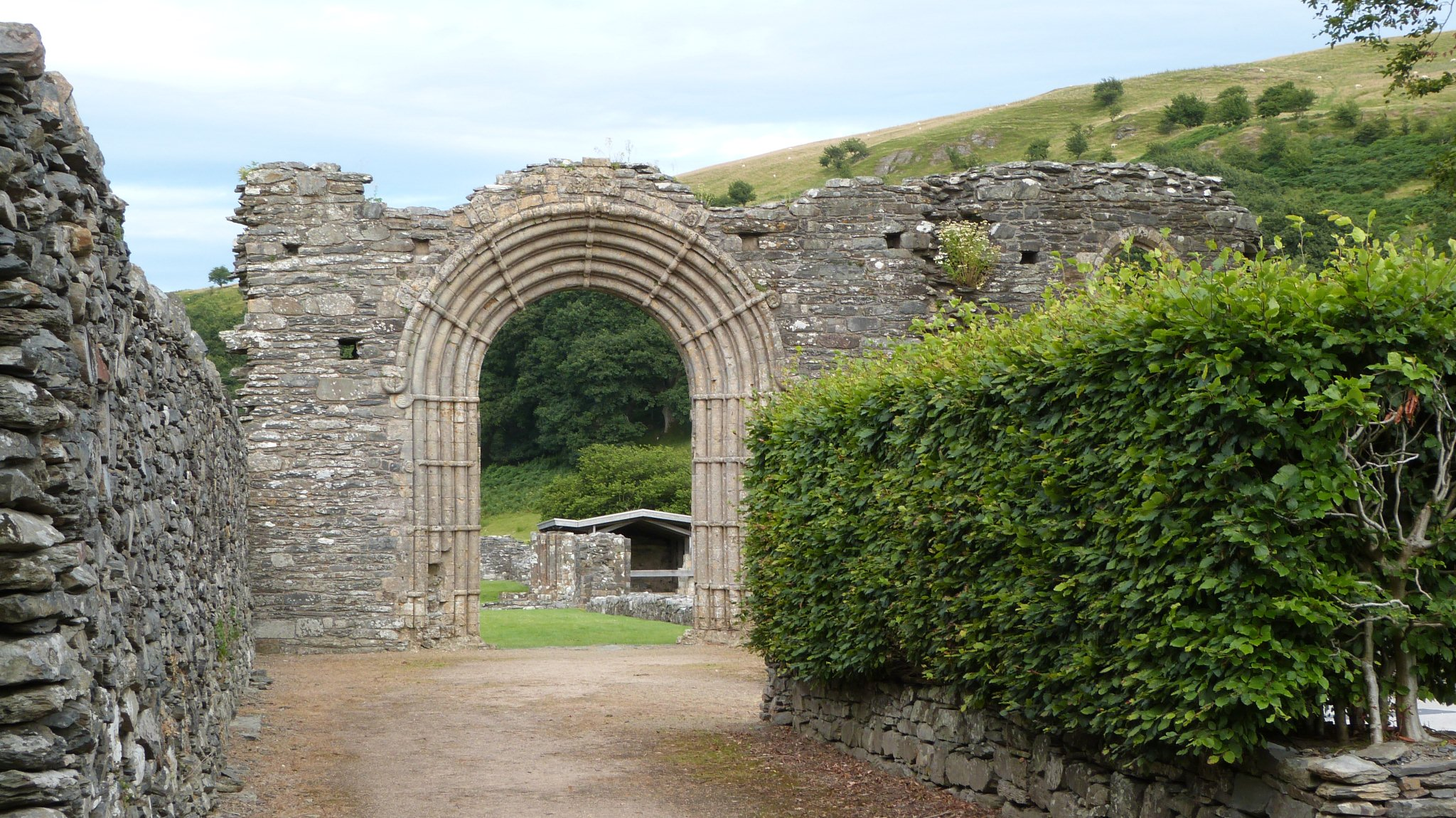
Strata Florida Abbey

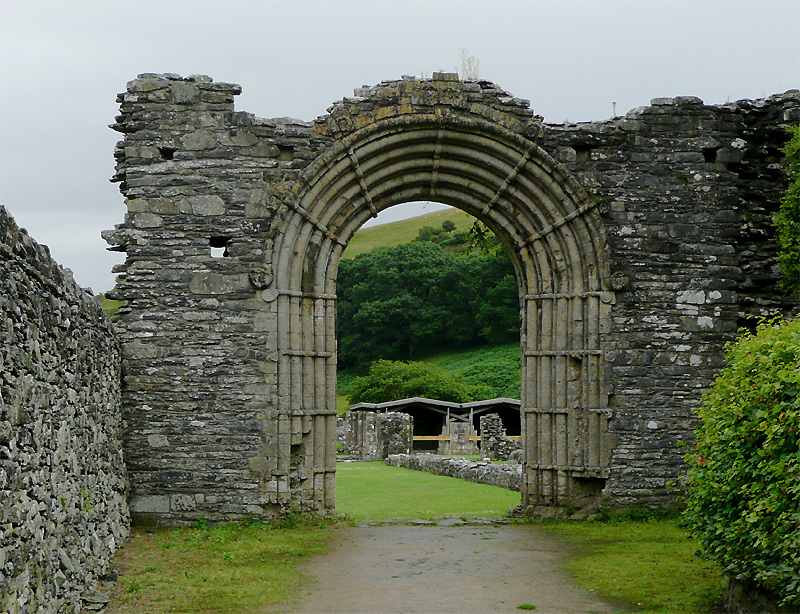
The west doorway to Strata Florida Abbey, Ceredigion

=== Abbey Cwmhir, Radnorshire ===
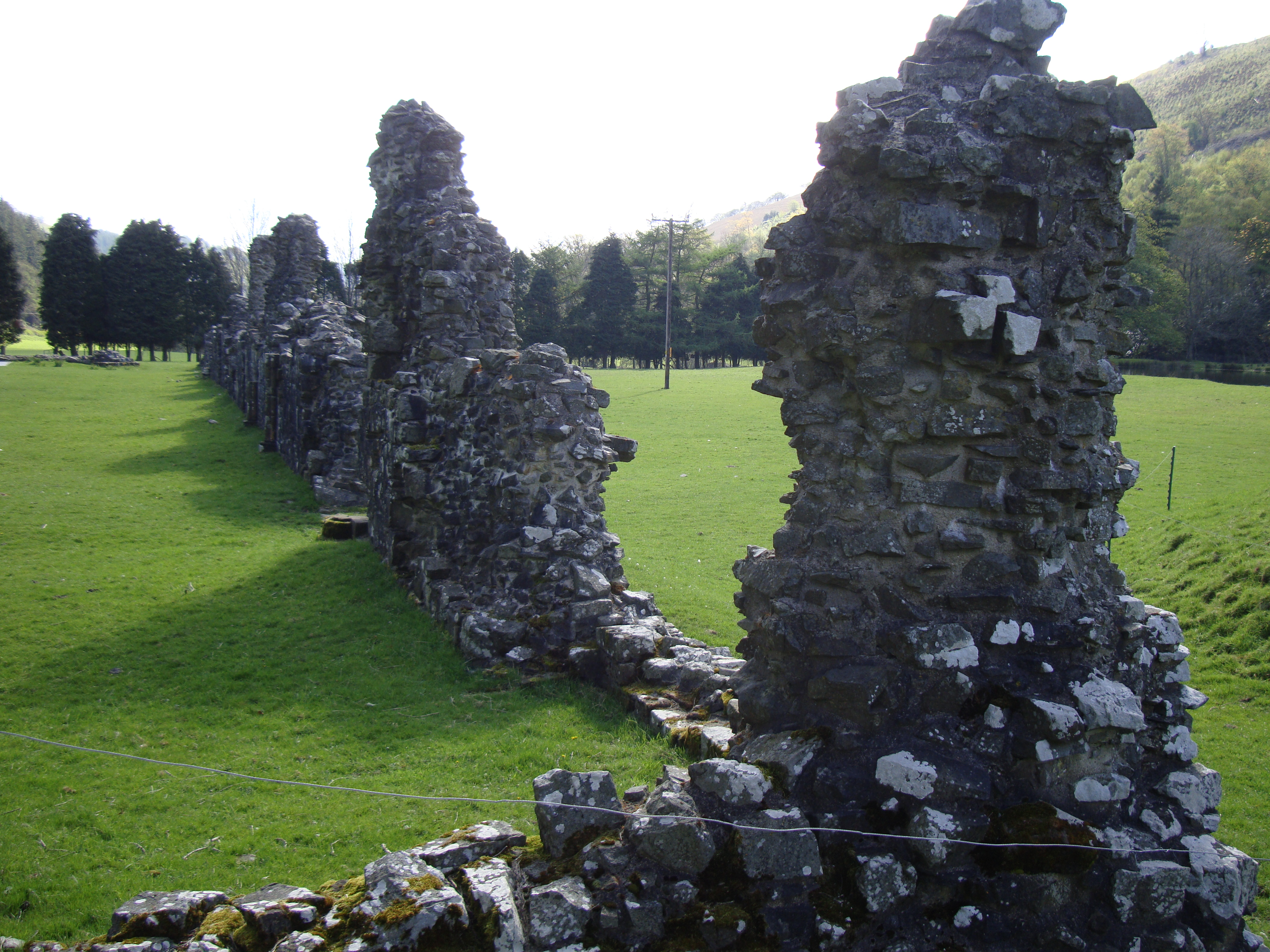
CwmhirAbbey

Williams published a history of this Cistercian Abbey in 1890 following the discovery of carved capitals while gardening by Mrs Philips, the owner of the Abbey. This led to a more detailed excavation of the nave the Abbey church, sponsored by the Society of Cymmrodorion in 1890, who were hoping to uncover the burial place of Llywelyn ap Gruffudd, Prince of Wales 1258–82.

=== Strata Marcella ===
Excavations carried out for the Powysland Club in 1890 and managed to recover much of the plan of the church of the Cistercian Abbey. The finds from the excavations are now in the Powysland Museum in Welshpool

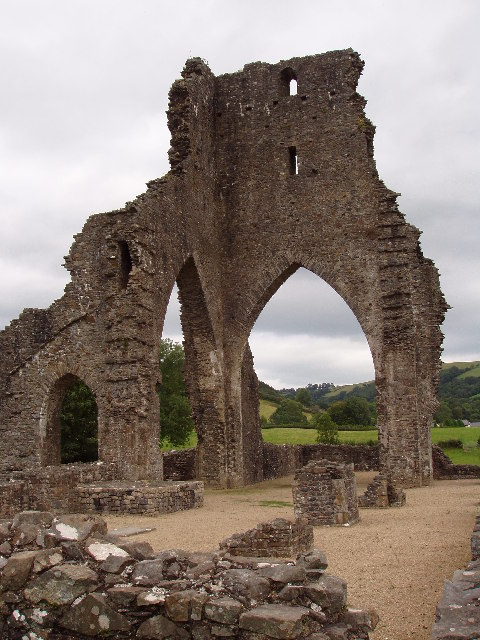
Abaty Talyllychau – geograph.org.uk – 119629

=== Talley Abbey ===
Talley Abbey in Carmarthenshire was a Premonstratensian Abbey founded around 1185 by Rhys ap Gruffydd. Williams was invited by Sir James William Drummond to arrange an exploratory excavation in 1892. This led to a local committee being formed and excavations continued until 1894 on the site.

== Architectural works by Stephen Williams include ==
=== Churches ===
All in Brecknockshire and Radnorshire

- Aberedw Medieval church repaired by Williams in 1888, who added the S doorway and belfry lights.
- Llandegley, Radnorshire. Williams added a chancel in 1874–6.
- Llandewi Ystradenni, Radnorshire. Restored 1889–90.
- Llanfihangel Rhydithon, Repairs by Williams1891.
- Llanfigan, Brecknockshire. Church restored 1888–92.
- Llanafan Fawr, Brecknockshire. Church re-built 1887-8
- Llanhamlach, Brecknockshire. 1886–8. Williams added a new porch and re-ordered the interior.
- Llanbadarn Fawr, Radnorshire. Re-built 1878–9.
- Llanbadarn Fynydd, Radnorshire. Restored 1894-5
- Llansantffraed, Brecknockshire. 1884–5.
- Llanyre. Radnorshire. St Llyr. Rebuilt 1885–7.
- Rhayader St Clement. Re-built by Williams in 1887 with rock dressed masonry.
- Nantgwyllt, Radnorshire. Church built in 1898– 1900, to replace the church flooded by the Caban Coch reservoir in the Elan valley
- Newbridge-on-Wye1883, Radnorshire. Built in 1883 and largely sponsored by the Venables family of Llysdinam.

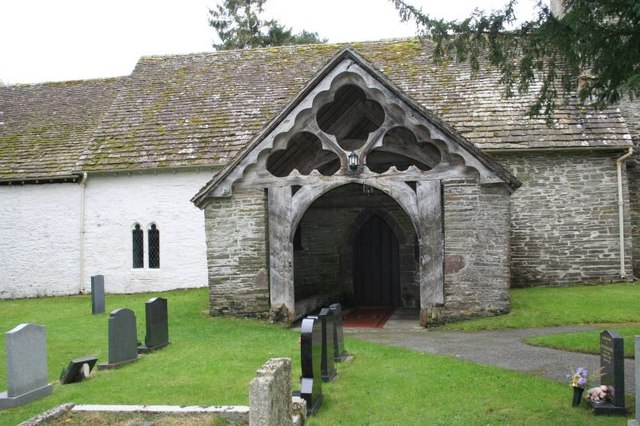
Aberedw Church porch - Repaired 1888

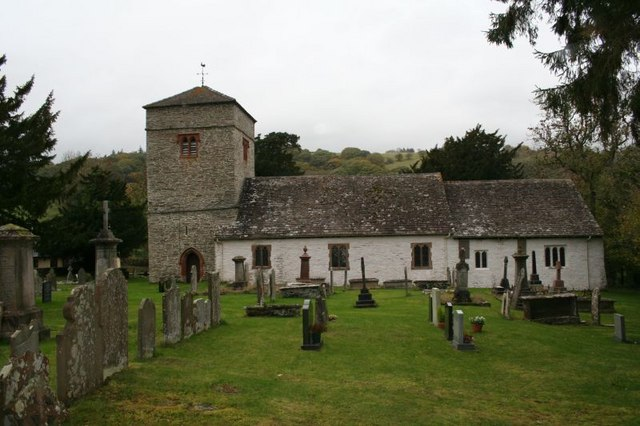
St Cewydd's Church, Aberedw - Repaired 1888

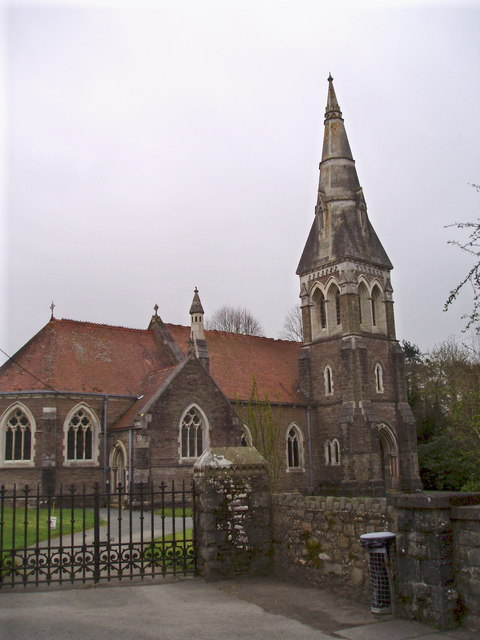
All Saints Church, Newbridge on Wye

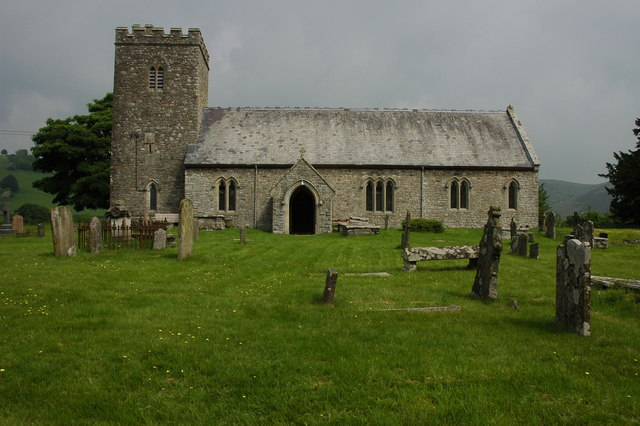
Llanafan-fawr Church Partly re-built 1878-9

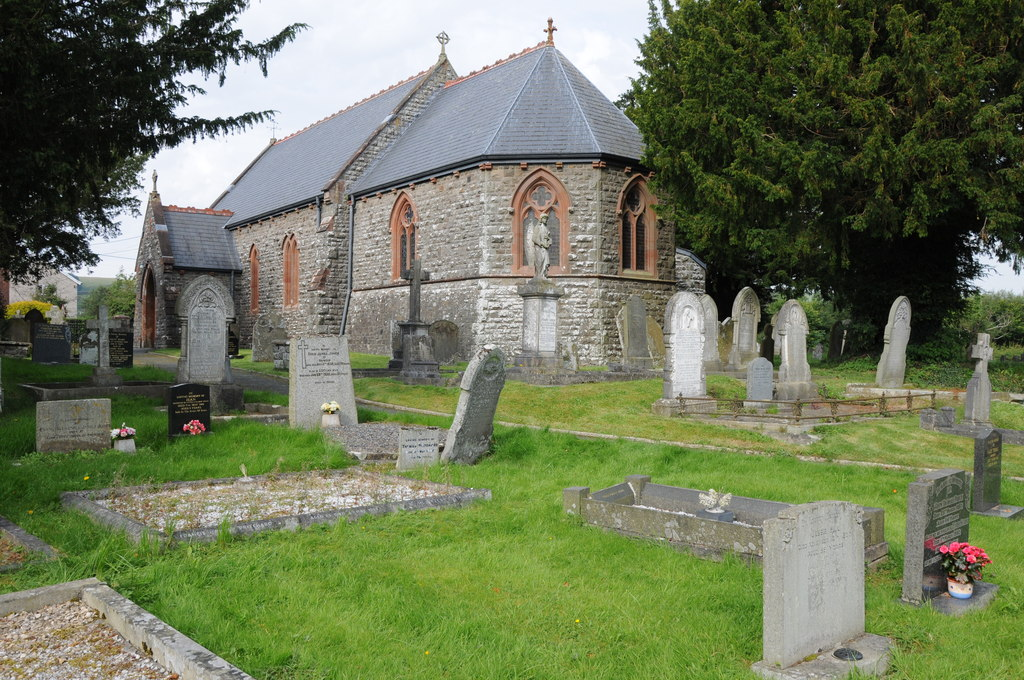
Llanyre church

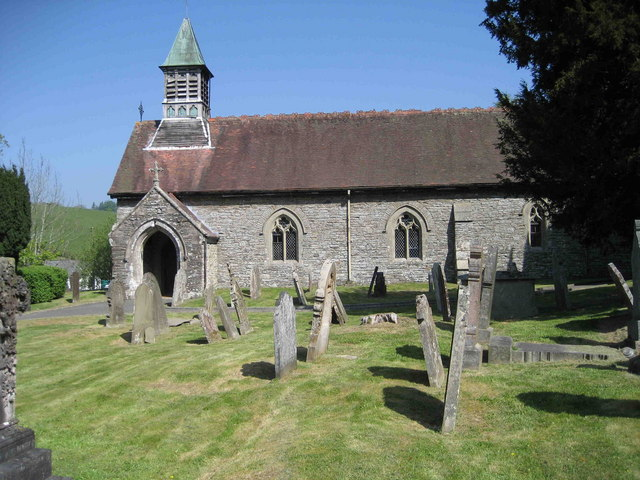
Eglwys Llanbadarn Fynydd

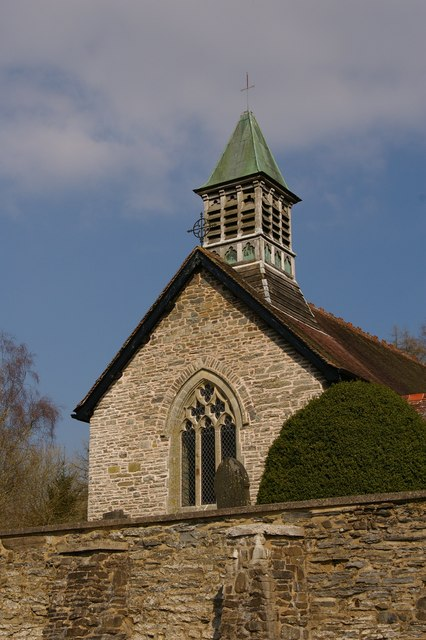
St Padarn's Church, Llanbadarn Fynydd. Re-built belltower, presumably by Williams.

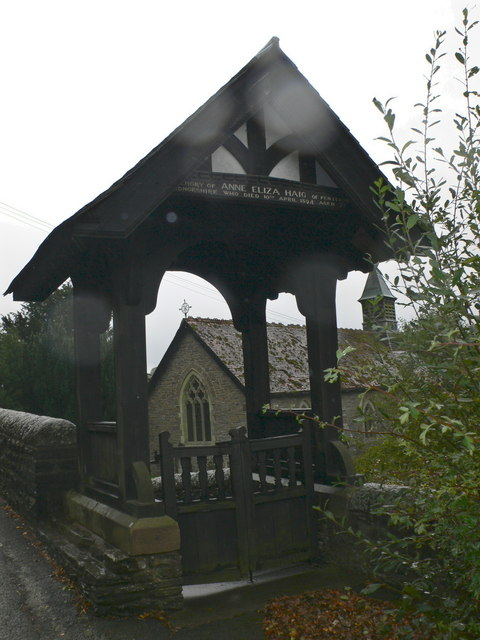
Llanbadarn Fynydd. Lych Gate 1894, presumably by Williams

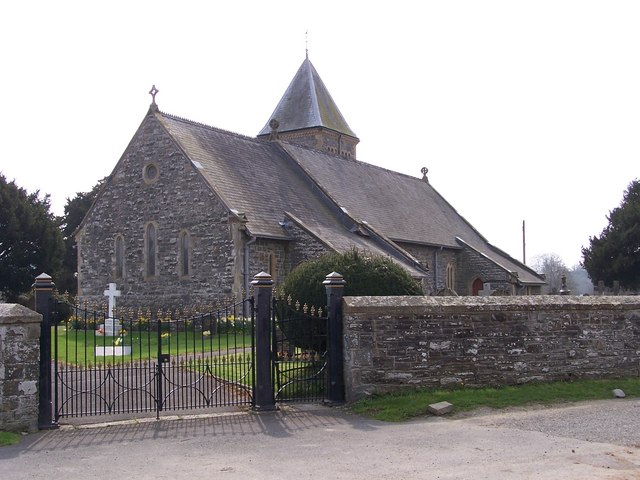
St Padarn Church, Llanbadarn Fawr (near Llandrindod Wells) - Rebuilt 1878-9

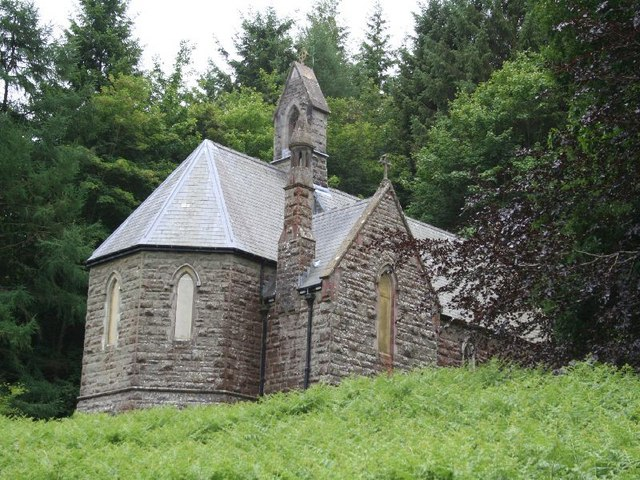
Nantgwyllt Church

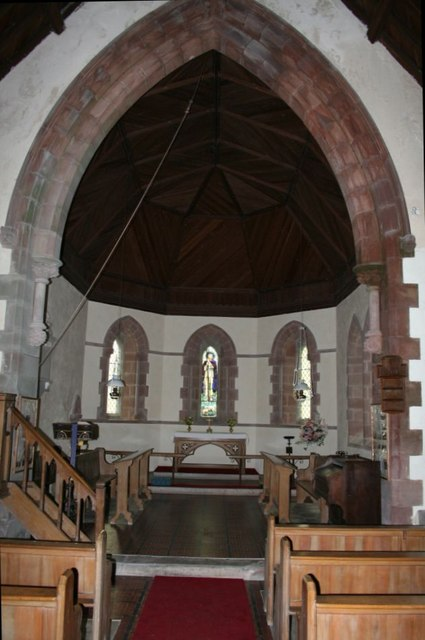
t Nantgwyllt Church. Arch in the church -

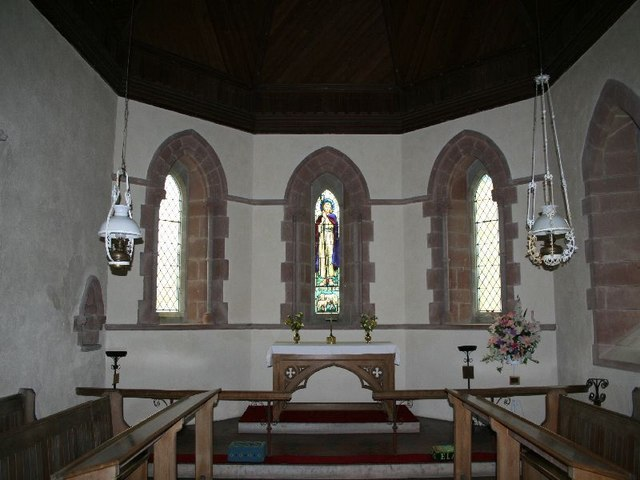
Nantgwyllt Church. Chancel

=== Public Buildings ===
- New Radnor Town Hall. Yellow brick. Enlarged1887.
- Militia Stores, Presteigne
- Presteigne Gaol- Re-modeling
- Rhayader Workhouse. Now Brynarvon County Hotel, Radnorshire. 1877. Three storied range with eight bays; rock faced with the windows trimmed in yellow brick.
- Rhayader Royal Lion Hotel. Alterations by Williams in 1894–6.
- Rhayader Police Station. 1865. Attributed to both Stephen Williams and to T Nicholson

=== Schools ===
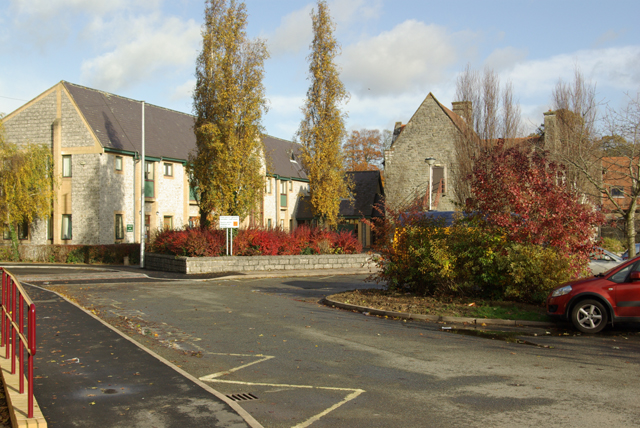
High School Builth- New block with William's old school on right

- Christ College, Brecon. A Boarding House of 1889.
- Builth Intermediate School (now High School), North Street, Brecknockshire. Tudor style of 1899.
- Llanwrtyd Wells, former school, Brecknockshire.1867/79. Long stone faced gabled range with Gothic windows and polychrome brick surrounds.
- Trefeglwys School, Montgomeryshire

=== Houses ===
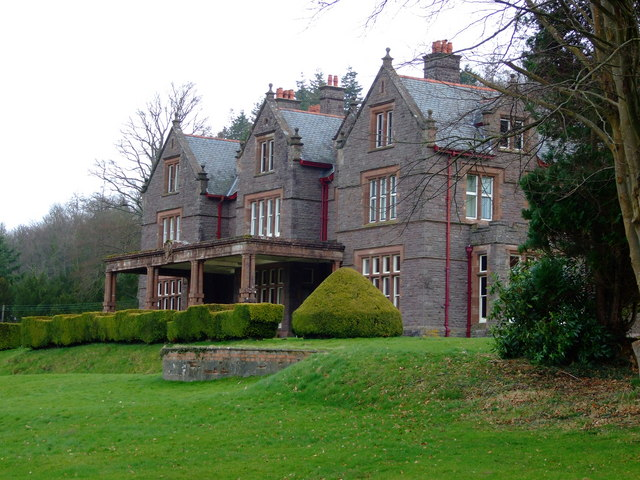
Buckland Hall, Bwlch, the West Front

- Brynmoel. Abbey Cwmhir, Radnorshire. Former vicarage by Williams 1892. Red brick, four bays with hipped roof and tall chimney stacks.
- Bryniago House, South Street, Rhayader. 1893. Built by Williams as his offices for the Elan Valley Reservoir scheme. Ground floor of rock faced rubble, with tile hanging above and a big timbered dormer.
- Penralley House, South Street, Rhayader. William's own house. An 18th century house which he extended in 1876.
- Cefnfaes Hall, Rhayader. Re-modeled by Williams c. 1875.
- Rhydoldog, Rhayader. Re-modeled by Williams in 1884.
- Brynwern Hall, Llanfihangel Bryn Paban, Brecknockshire. 1886. Built for Clifton Mogg. Neo-Elizabethan
- Buckland Hall, Bwlch, Brecknockshire. 1896–8. Re-built 1896 after a fire. Sandstone with orange ashlar dressings.
- Doldowlod, Llanwrthwl, Radnorshire. Williams provided plans in 1881 for a new carriageway and conservatory.
- Llysdinam Hall. Brecknockshire. For the Venables Family. Originally built in 1829, but extended by Williams in 1871.
- Glanbrydan Park. Carmarthenshire. Re-modeled and enlarged for the Richardson family 1885–86. Williams also built the coach house and stables.

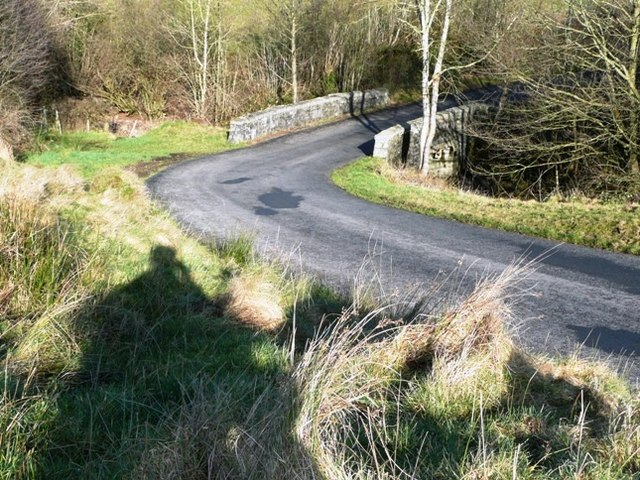
Bridge over Nant Gwenddwr at Erwood

- Llwynbarried Hall, Nantmel, Radnorshire. Remodelled and much enlarged in 1886–89. Originally a 16th-century house. Bargeboarded gables and some tile hanging. Neo-Jacobean staircase.

=== Bridges ===
As County Surveyor Williams was responsible for at least six bridges. These include

- Erwood
- Newbridge-on-Wye1885, Radnorshire. The older cast iron toll bridge with lattice girders. Made at 'W Thomas Railway Works' in Llanidloes. Credits on cast plaque to W Clifton-Mogg and S. W. Williams, engineer

== Publications by S W Williams ==
- "The Cistercian Abbey of Strata Florida: Its History, and an Account of the Recent Excavations Made on Its Site." Whiting & Co., 1889, London
- (with Jones M C), “Excavations on the ste of Strata Marcella Abbey”,’‘Montgomeryshire Collections’‘, Vol 25,,1891.
- “The Cistererian Abbey of Cwmhir, Radnorshire”, Montgomeryshire Collections, Vol 24, 1890, 395–416.
- “The Cistererian Abbey of Cwmhir, Radnorshire”, Transactions of the Hon. Society of Cymmrodorion, 1894–5.
- “The Abbey of Cwmhir, Radnorshire”, ‘‘Archaeologia Cambrensis’’, 1897, 150–2
- “The Cistererian Abbey of Cwmhir, Radnorshire”, Transactions of the Hon. Society of Cymmrodorion, 1894–5.
- “Excavations at Talley Abbey”, ‘‘Archaeologia Cambrensis’’, 1897, 229–247.

== Literature ==
- Antonia Brodie (ed) ‘’Directory of British Architects, 1834–1914’’: 2 Vols, British Architectural Library, Royal Institute of British Architects, 2001
- R W D Fenn and J B Sinclair ‘‘Our Ubiquitous Friend” (The work of Stephen Williams),”Transactions of the Radnorshire Society” Vol 59,1989.
- R Scourfield and R Haslam "The Buildings of Wales: Powys; Montgomeryshire, Radnorshire and Breconshire" Yale University Press 2013.
- Williams, David Henry (1992). “ An Appreciation of Stephen William Williams, Montgomeryshire Collections, Vol 80, 55–94
- Williams, David Henry (1995).”The Exploration and Excavation of Cistercian Sites in Wales”, Archaeologia Cambrensis, Vol 144, 1–25
- Williams, David Henry (2001). The Welsh Cistercians: written to commemorate the centenary of the death of Stephen William Williams (1837–1899) (The father of Cistercian archaeology in Wales). Gracewing Publishing. p. 145. ISBN 978-0-85244-354-5.
