= St Michael the Archangel, Llanyblodwel =

Church in Shropshire, England

Coordinates: 52.7982°N 3.1296°W

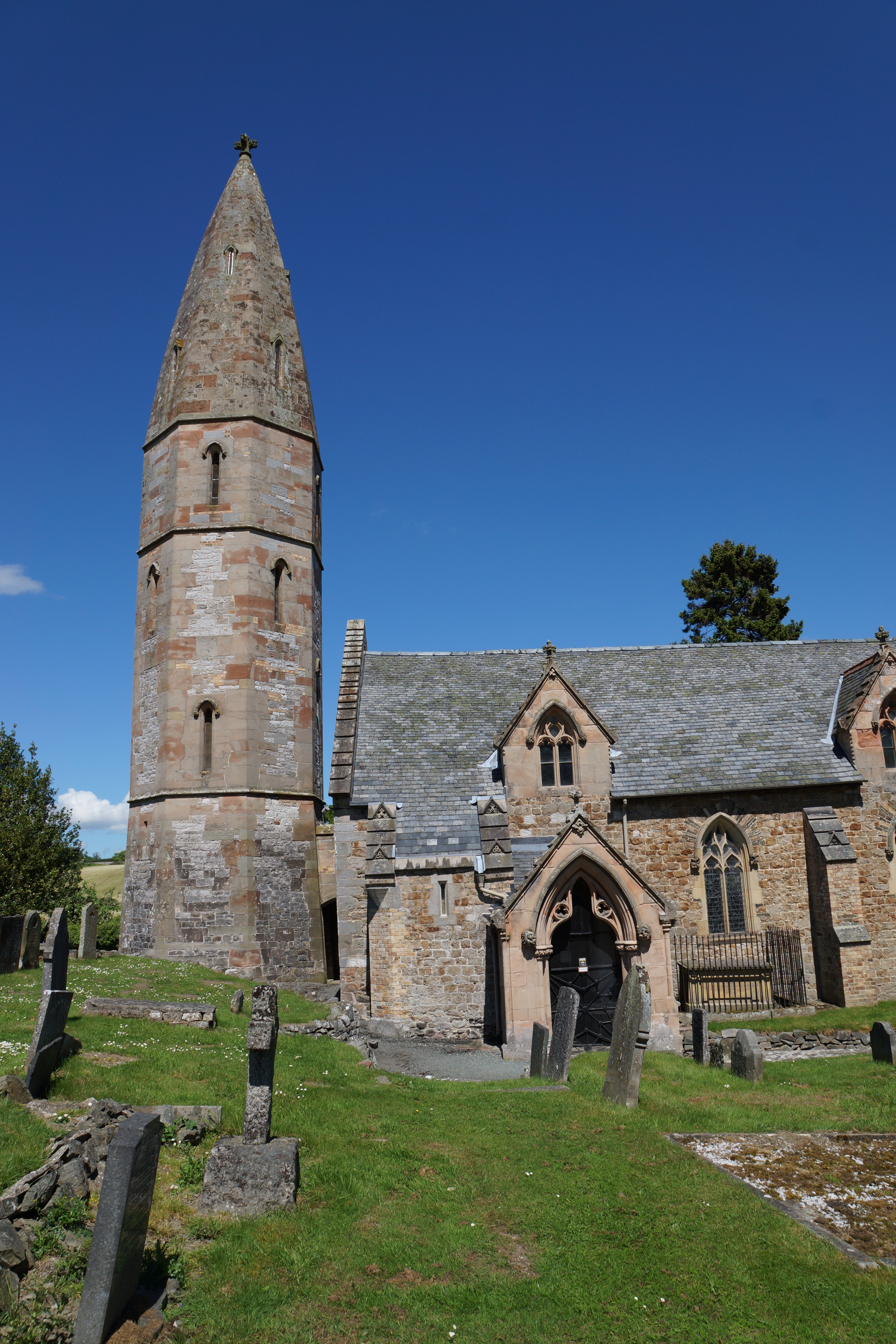
St Michael the Archangel

St Michael the Archangel is a Grade I listed church in Llanyblodwel, in Shropshire, England. It has a spire of unusual shape and was designed in 1847–1856 by the vicar, John Parker.

== John Parker ==
The Grade I listed church was designed and rebuilt from a medieval church in stages between 1847 and 1853 by the vicar, John Parker (vicar 1845–60). He designed the porches, ceilings, windows and reredos. The idiosyncratic almost detached steeple was designed and added 1855-6 by the same vicar, who also designed and built the two nearby listed buildings comprising the school house and schoolmaster's house (at one time used as the post office).

== Interior ==
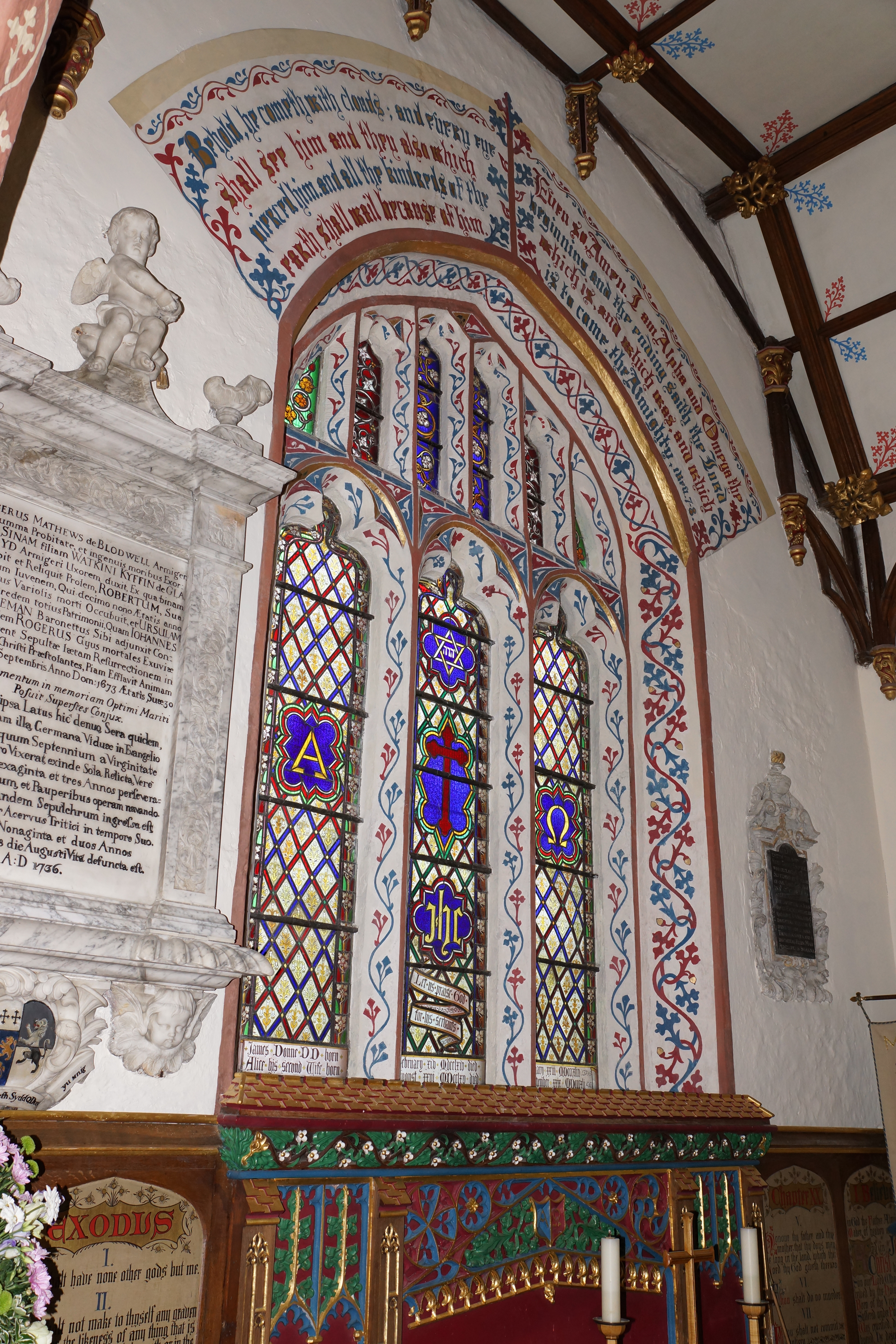
Interior including east window

The 15th century rood screen is carved with vines and animals. Parker covered the walls with large scripture quotations. A double-decker pulpit was installed.

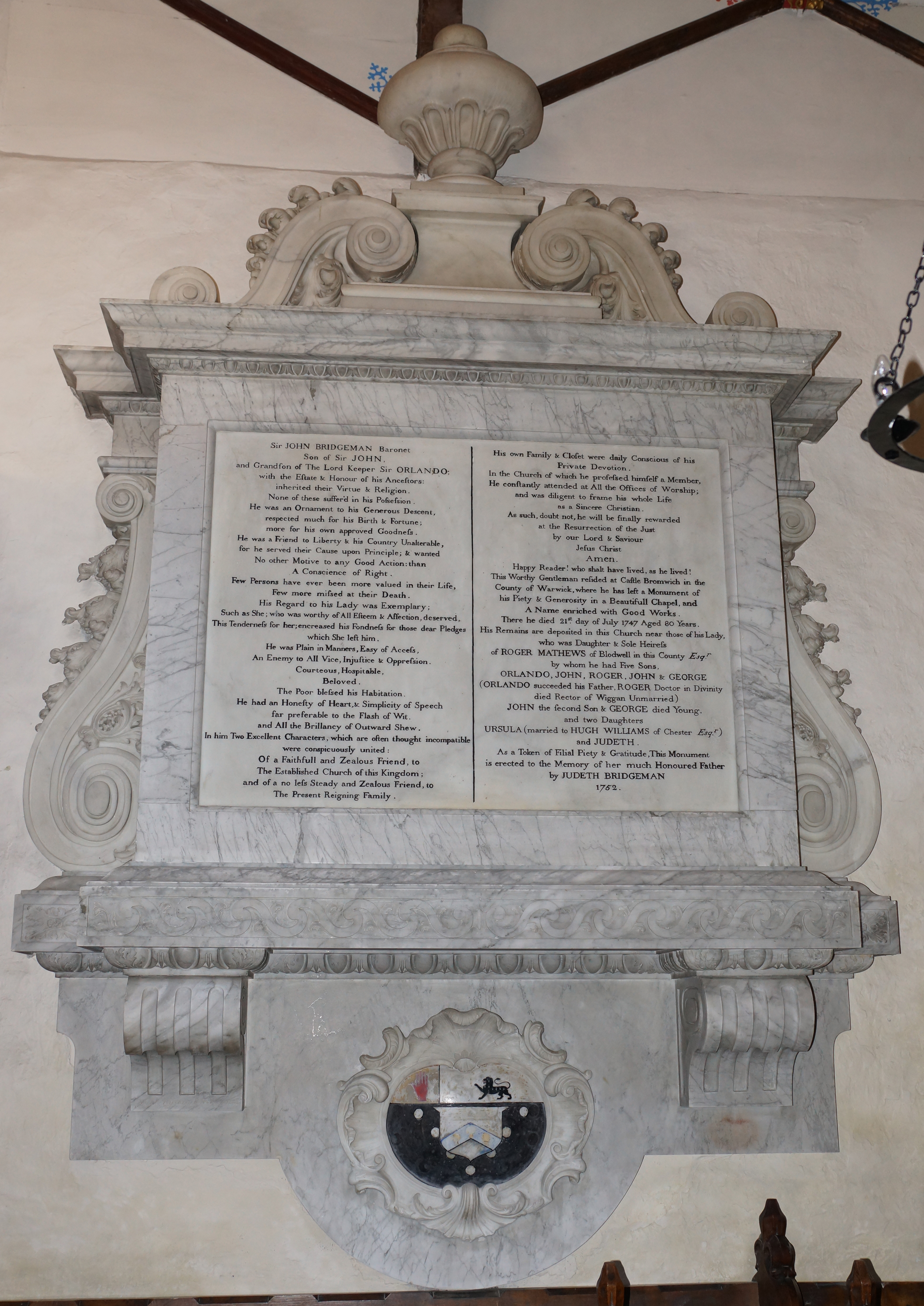
Funeral monument to Sir John Bridgeman, 3rd Baronet

The church contains a memorial to Elias Owen (1833–1899), the Welsh antiquarian and author of "Welsh Folklore", published in 1887, who was incumbent at the church from 1892 until his death, and a number of monuments to the Tanat and Bridgeman families. There is also a First World War memorial in the form of a stained glass window, depicting a soldier presenting his sword to Christ, by William Pearce Ltd of Birmingham, with an associated brass plaque below.

== South porch ==
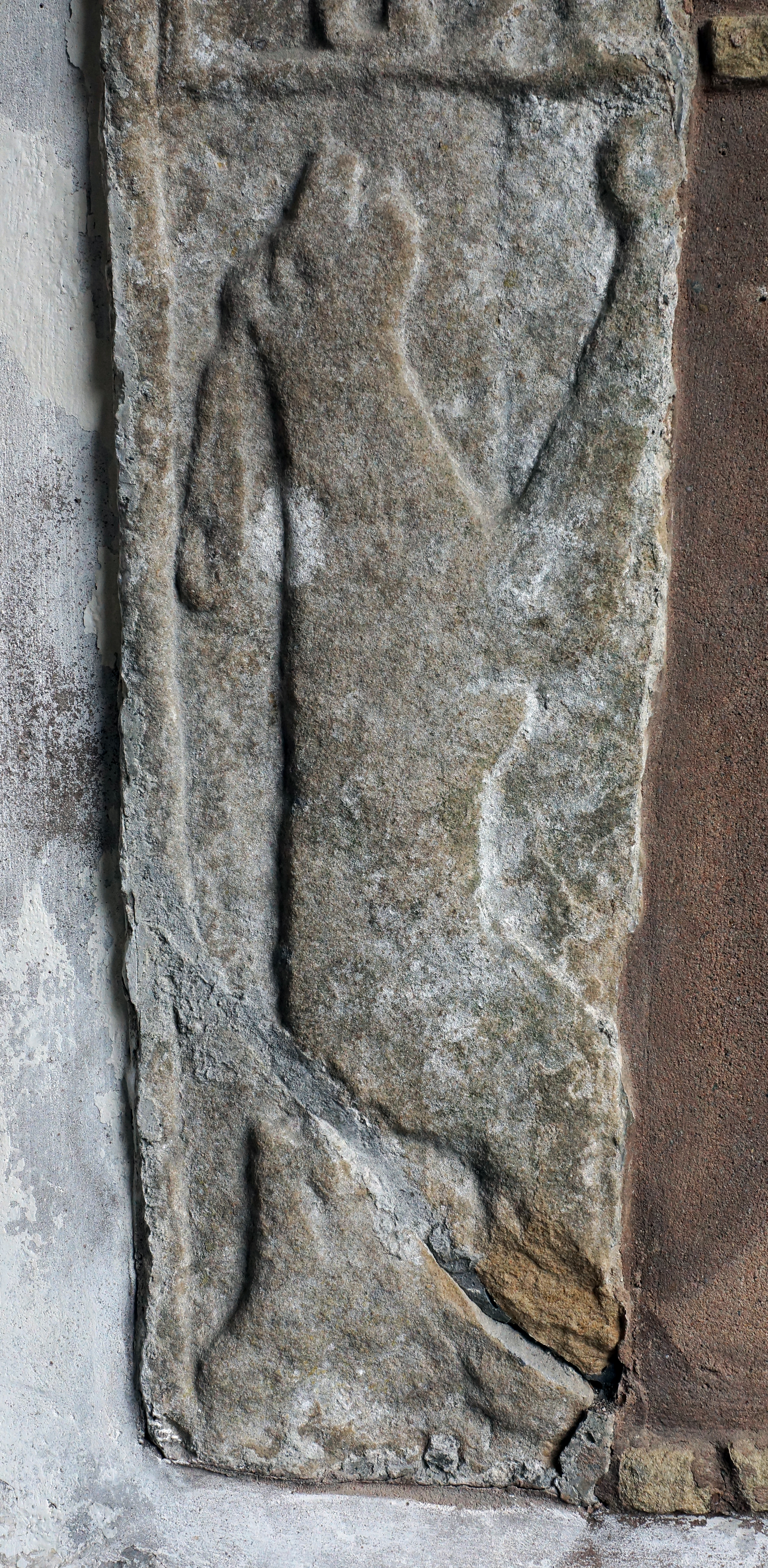
Hare on reconstructed gravestone in porch

Two fragments of a 14th-century grave stone are attached to the inner wall of the porch depicting a coursing hare and Lombardic lettering possibly relating to the legend of Melangell, which some antiquaries have tried to connect with the hare iconography seen at Pennant Melangell, which once received the tithes of the township of Bryn.

== Steeple ==
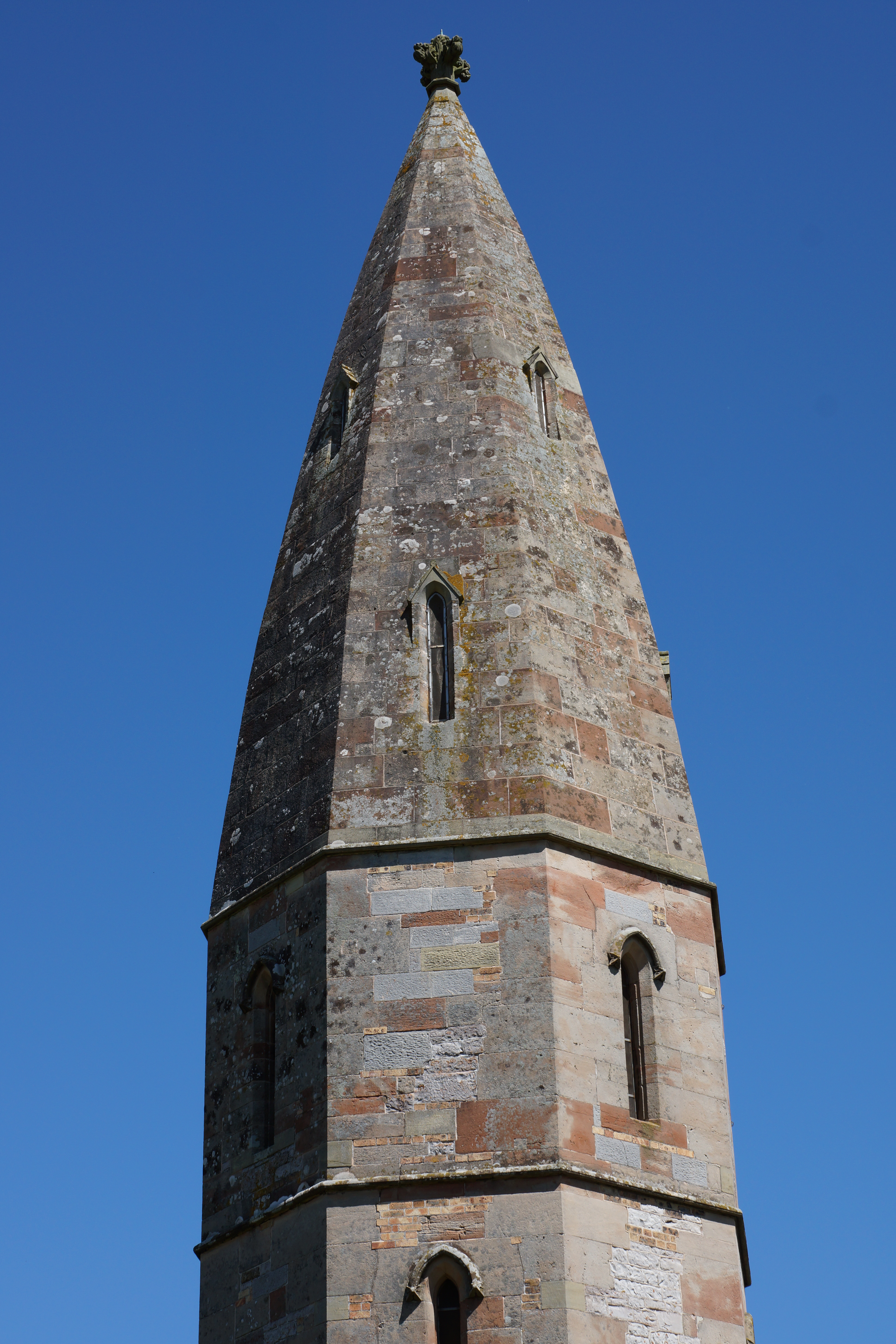
The unusual domical spire

The steeple was built after and slightly apart from the church and linked to it by, effectively, a corridor. It is of octagonal cross section with a spire of curved circular arc outline to the apex – a domical vault – a shape that Parker was convinced would be stronger than the usual hollow spire construction where the thickness of the straight sides diminishes towards the apex. The height is 104 ft (tower 57 ft and spire 47 ft). The radius of the arc forming the curved spire is 247 ft. The tower was apparently modelled on that of Freiburg Minster in Germany.

== Later Victorian obliteration ==
Later in the Victorian period Parker's decorations were obliterated with wall wash and the double-decker pulpit removed.

== Restoration ==
In 1960 the late Victorian restoration was partly reversed, revealing some of the old decoration and restoring much of the rest.

== Churchyard ==
The churchyard contains the war graves of three British soldiers of World War I. In addition to the former vicars John Parker and Elias Owen, the Victorian composer and conductor Henry David Leslie (1822-1896) is also buried in the churchyard.

== See also ==
- Grade I listed churches in Shropshire
- Listed buildings in Llanyblodwel
