= Listed buildings in Llanyblodwel =

Llanyblodwel is a civil parish in Shropshire, England. It contains 49 listed buildings that are recorded in the National Heritage List for England. Of these, one is listed at Grade I, the highest of the three grades, one is at Grade II*, the middle grade, and the others are at Grade II, the lowest grade. The parish contains the village of Llanyblodwel and smaller settlements, and is otherwise rural. Most of the listed buildings are houses, farmhouses and farm buildings, many of which are timber framed and date from the 14th to the 17th century. The other listed buildings include a church, memorials, coffins and a sundial in the churchyard, a public house, a country house and associated structures, a former toll house, nine groups of lime kilns, a smelt flue chimney, two bridges, a pump, and a war memorial.

== Key ==
Grade	Criteria
I	Buildings of exceptional interest, sometimes considered to be internationally important
II*	Particularly important buildings of more than special interest
II	Buildings of national importance and special interest

== Buildings ==
Name and location	Photograph	Date	Notes	Grade
Erw Bant and outbuilding 52.79883°N 3.12926°W	—	Late 14th or 15th century	The cottage is timber framed with cruck construction, and was rebuilt in brick with a dentilled eaves cornice in the 18th and 19th centuries. It has a stone plinth, a slate roof, one storey and an attic, two bays, and a rear lean-to. The windows are casements, and there are two eaves dormers with hipped roofs. The outbuilding, attached to the right at the front, dates from the 18th century, and is timber framed with red brick infill on a limestone plinth and has a tile roof.	II
Stone coffin 52.79824°N 3.12973°W	—	14th or 15th century (probable)	The coffin is attached to the north wall of the tower of St Michael's Church. It is in limestone, and consists of a dug-out stone coffin with position for head and shoulders at one end.	II
Stone coffin 52.79820°N 3.12979°W	—	14th or 15th century (probable)	The coffin is attached to the west wall of the tower of St Michael's Church. It is in limestone, and consists of a dug-out stone coffin with position for head and shoulders at one end.	II
Horse Shoe Inn and barn 52.79780°N 3.12615°W		Late 15th to early 16th century (probable)	The farmhouse, later a public house, and the barn attached to the left are timber framed with brick infill on a stone plinth and with slate roofs. The public house has two storeys, and three bays, a later two-bay cross-wing, and a further extension on the right. The windows are casements, there is a lean-to porch, and a mounting block attached to the cross-wing. The barn dates from the 17th century, with weatherboarding, and a limestone extension on the left. It contains casement windows and a doorway.	II
Bank Farmhouse and barn 52.80808°N 3.13142°W	—	Early to mid 16th century	The farmhouse, later a private house, and the former threshing barn, have been altered. The house is in roughcast timber framing with weatherboarding at the rear and some brick, on a limestone plinth, and with a slate roof. There is one storey and an attic, two bays, and a stone lean-to on the left. The windows are casements, and there are two gabled eaves dormers. The barn is timber framed with weatherboarding, on a limestone plinth, and with a slate roof, and it contains three doorways. Inside the house is an inglenook fireplace.	II
Garth-fach; 52.80510°N 3.14804°W	—	Early 17th century	A former farmhouse, it is timber framed with red brick infill on a limestone plinth, and has a slate roof. There is one storey and an attic, a two-bay house with a two-bay byre to the right, and a lean-to further to the right with a corrugated iron roof. The windows are casements, and there is a gabled eaves dormer.	II
Llan Farmhouse; 52.79757°N 3.12628°W	—	Early 17th century	The farmhouse, later a private house, has been altered and extended. It is timber framed with brick infill on a limestone plinth, and has a slate roof. There are two storeys and an attic, and two bays. The windows are casements, and there is a gabled porch.	II
Tyn-y-coed; 52.79070°N 3.13117°W	—	Early 17th century	The former farmhouse has been altered. It is mainly timber framed with red brick and rendered infill on a limestone plinth, the left gable end is in red brick, and the roof is slated. There are two storeys and an attic, two bays, and a single-storey rear extension in stone and brick. In the centre is a lean-to porch, and the windows are casements.	II
Brynfedwyn; 52.79109°N 3.13635°W	—	Early to mid 17th century	A farmhouse, then a private house, it was later altered. The early part is timber framed with rendered infill, the later parts are in brick and limestone and the roof is slated. There is one storey and an attic, three or four bays, and an outshut at the rear. Most of the windows are casements, and inside the house is an inglenook fireplace.	II
Farm building, Blodwel Hall; 52.79785°N 3.09654°W	—	Mid 17th century (probable)	The farm building contains a vehicle entrance arch. It is in limestone with some timber framing, and has a slate roof. There are two levels. In the upper level is a loft door approached by external steps, and to the right is the vehicle entrance with a wooden lintel. The windows are mullioned, and there are two datestones.	II
The Cottage and outbuilding 52.79793°N 3.12641°W	—	Mid to late 17th century	The cottage is in limestone and brick, the outbuilding to the left is partly timber framed, and the roof is slated. The cottage has one storey and an attic, two bays, and lean-tos at the rear. It contains casement windows, two gabled eaves dormers, and has a gabled porch. The outbuilding contains windows and has an inserted garage door.	II
Barn east of Cefn Farmhouse; 52.80939°N 3.11656°W	—	Late 17th century	The barn was extended in the early 18th century. The original part is timber framed and clad in corrugated iron, on a stone plinth, the extension is in red brick, and the roof is slated. The original part has three bays, and is open to the roof. The extension consists of a cowhouse and a hayloft. In the cowhouse is a segmental-headed doorway, and elsewhere are fixed windows and another door.	II
Barn southeast of Garth Issa; 52.80351°N 3.14533°W	—	Late 17th century (probable)	The barn is timber framed with weatherboarding on a limestone plinth, partly rebuilt in yellow engineering brick, and with a slate roof. There are stable doors on the front and rear.	II
Barn southwest of Tyn-y-coed; 52.79051°N 3.13131°W	—	Late 17th century	The barn is timber framed with weatherboarding, the right gable end is in limestone, and the roof is in corrugated iron. There are two doorways and a gabled eaves dormer.	II
Barn, cart shelter and granary northwest of Tyn-y-coed; 52.79071°N 3.13141°W	—	Late 17th century	The right bay was added later. The building is timber framed with weatherboarding on a stone plinth, the left gable end and the right bay are in limestone with dressings in red and yellow brick, and the roof is in corrugated iron. The openings include doorways, fixed windows and eaves hatches.	II
Blodwel Hall and wall 52.79757°N 3.09685°W	—	1707	A country house that was remodelled in the 19th century, it is in red brick on a chamfered plinth, with a moulded band, corner pilasters, and a dentilled eaves cornice. There are three storeys, and a T-shaped plan consisting of a three-bay front and a rear wing. On the front is a gabled porch, a doorway with a rectangular fanlight, and a datestone. The windows are sashes, some of them horizontally-sliding. Attached to the house is a garden wall, partly in red brick and partly in limestone, incorporating an outbuilding with a slate roof.	II
Llanyblodwel Bridge; 52.79818°N 3.12617°W		1710	The bridge, which was repaired in 1886, carries a road over the Afon Tanat. It is in sandstone, and has a central four-centred arch flanked by a segmental arch on each side. There are two triangular cutwaters that rise to form pedestrian refuges, a low parapet with cast iron railings, and abutments. On the bridge is an inscribed cast iron plaque. The bridge is also a Scheduled Monument.	II
Sundial; 52.79802°N 3.12957°W		1712	The sundial is in the churchyard of St Michael's Church. It is in limestone, and consists of a vase-shaped baluster with a moulded plinth and capital, and it stands on two circular steps. The plate and gnomon are missing.	II
Matthews memorial 52.79825°N 3.12936°W	—	c. 1715	The memorial is attached to the east wall of St Michael's Church, and is to the memory of Edward Matthews. It is in limestone, and consists of a plain tablet with a moulded plinth, pilastered corner piers, gadrooned capping, and pyramidal finials flanking a moulded finial surmounted by an armorial device.	II
Summer house, Blodwel Hall; 52.79791°N 3.09761°W	—	1718	The summer house in the garden of the hall is in red brick with rusticated sandstone at the front, rusticated corner piers at the rear, and it has a slate roof with coped verges. There is a square plan and one storey, with a moulded eaves cornice, a pedimented gable and finials. The pediment contains an elaborate carving with garlands and armorial devices. In the centre is a moulded round-headed arch with pilasters and a carved keystone. There is also a segmental-headed doorway and an infilled window.	II*
Pen-y-bont; 52.80671°N 3.16672°W	—	1718	The bridge carries the B4396 road over the River Cynlaith, and here forms the boundary between England and Wales. It is in limestone and consists of a single segmental arch. The bridge has projecting keystones, rusticated voussoirs, a string course, and parapets ending in rectangular corner piers.	II
Table tomb 52.79817°N 3.12926°W	—	Early 18th century {probable)	The table tomb is in the churchyard of St Michael's Church. It is in limestone, and has a moulded top ledger supported on carved ends with square balusters in the centre. On the east end is a carving of skull and crossbones.	II
Tanat House and outbuildings 52.79845°N 3.12907°W		Mid to late 18th century	The house is in limestone with red brick dressings and has an open-well hipped slate roof. There are two storeys and an attic, and five bays. In the centre is a Doric porch with an entablature, above the door is a rectangular fanlight, and the windows are sashes. Attached to the rear on the left are outbuildings forming an L-shaped plan around a courtyard. They are in sandstone with a slate roof, and have one storey. They contain casement windows and doorways.	II
Glan-yr-afon Hall and walls 52.80901°N 3.14576°W	—	c. 1790	A small country house in red brick on a rendered stone plinth, with stone dressings, and a hipped slate roof surmounted by a glass cupola. There are two storeys and a semi-basement, and sides of three bays. The central doorway has Composite columns and a moulded entablature, and the windows are sashes. On the garden front is a full-height bow window with a cast iron balcony. There are attached red brick walls with stone coping.	II
Stable block south of Huntsman's Lodge; 52.80944°N 3.14785°W	—	c. 1800	The stable block is in limestone, the front is in red brick with a dentil eaves cornice, and it has a double-span hipped slate roof. There are two storeys and a front of five bays, the middle bay pedimented. In the ground floor are vehicle arches, segmental-headed stable doors, and a central doorway with a segmental head. The windows are casements, there are two eaves hatches, and one window contains Gothic Y-tracery.	II
Woodlands House; 52.80052°N 3.13424°W	—	c. 1800	A house that was extended and converted by Rev, John Parker between 1845 and 1857 into a vicarage, and has since become a private house. It is built in brick with stone dressings and has a slate roof with shaped gables. There are two storeys and a cellar, with a main block and a service wing. The doorway has a Tudor arched head, the windows in the main block are sash windows, and there are mullioned windows in the service wing. A garden wall runs from the south of the house, and contains an arched and inscribed archway.	II
Garth Issa; 52.80376°N 3.14580°W	—	Late 18th or early 19th century	A farmhouse, probably incorporating earlier material, it is in limestone, with dressings and a rear wing in red brick, and it has a slate roof. There are two storeys and an L-shaped plan, consisting of a three-bay range and a rear wing. The windows in the main range are sashes, and in the wing is a casement window. The doorway is approached by steps, and above it is a segmental hood.	II
Gate House; 52.80433°N 3.10142°W		Early 19th century	Originally a toll house. later a private house, it is in limestone with a slate roof. The central bay is canted and has two storeys and a gabled porch. To the left is a single-storey wing and to the right is a wing with two storeys. The windows are casements.	II
Gate piers and gates, Glan-yr-afon Hall; 52.80798°N 3.14238°W	—	Early 19th century (probable)	There are two pairs of gate piers flanking the drive to the hall. They have a square section, and are in cast iron with openwork and urn finials. Between the outer piers are railings, and between the inner piers are gates, both in wrought iron.	II
Hamer memorial 52.79812°N 3.12955°W	—	Early 19th century	The memorial is in the churchyard of St Michael's Church, and is to the memory of Mary Hamer. It is a chest tomb in limestone and has a rectangular plan. The tomb has a moulded plinth and capping, pilastered corner piers, a chamfered top ledger, and a moulded inscription panel on the south site. It is in an enclosure with cast iron railings on a stone plinth.	II
Limekilns at NGR SJ 2631 2385; 52.80731°N 3.09439°W	—	Early 19th century	The limekilns are in limestone, and have a buttressed revetment wall, and eight segmental-headed kilns that are open at the top, with ovens in yellow brick at the rear.	II
Limekilns at NGR SJ 2663 2385; 52.80730°N 3.08999°W	—	Early 19th century (probable)	The limekilns are in limestone, and have a segmental arch at the front and two brick ovens at the rear.	II
Limekilns at NGR SJ 2668 2388; 52.80754°N 3.08926°W	—	Early 19th century (probable)	The limekilns are in limestone. There is a high revetment wall with buttresss, and four segmental-headed kilns, the right kiln containing engineering brick. The kilns are open at the top, the three to the right are linked by a tunnel, and there are brick ovens at the rear.	II
Limekilns at NGR SJ 2682 2396; 52.80826°N 3.08728°W	—	Early 19th century (probable)	The limekilns are in limestone, and consist of two segmental arches linked by a segmental-arched tunnel.	II
Limekilns at NGR SJ 2698 2412; 52.80959°N 3.08488°W	—	Early 19th century (probable)	The limekilns are in limestone yellow brick heads to the arches. They consist of a high revetment wall and three segmental-arched kilns.	II
Limekilns at NGR SJ 2706 2412; 52.81022°N 3.08328°W	—	Early 19th century	The limekilns are in limestone. There is a high revetment wall and three segmental-headed kilns.	II
Limekilns at NGR SJ 2717 2411; 52.80964°N 3.08197°W	—	Early 19th century (probable)	The limekilns are in limestone. There is a high revetment wall and three segmental-headed kilns, and a lower revetment wall.	II
Limekilns at NGR SJ 2735 2421; 52.81021°N 3.07967°W	—	Early 19th century (probable)	The limekilns are in limestone, and consist of two segmental arches.	II
Limekilns at NGR SJ 2771 2441; 52.81255°N 3.07427°W	—	Early 19th century (probable)	The limekilns are in limestone with red brick in the arches. There is a high revetment wall and three segmental-headed kilns that are open to the top.	II
Bridge at NGR SJ 24844 24449; 52.81231°N 3.11648°W		1844	The bridge, which was designed by Edward Haycock, carries a road over a stream. It is in sandstone and consists of a single round-headed arch. The bridge has a raised keystone, voussoirs, an impost band, a flat string course, and a parapet.	II
St Michael's Church; 52.79823°N 3.12952°W		1847–53	The church was designed by Rev, John Parker, and the steeple was added in 1855–56. It is in limestone and gritstone, incorporating material from a medieval church, rendered on the north side, and has a slate roof. The steeple also contains some sandstone and brick. The church consists of a nave and a chancel in one cell, a north aisle, north and south porches, and a detached west steeple linked to the church by a vestibule. The steeple has an octagonal plan, it contains lancet windows with hood moulds, lucarnes in the spire, and a floriated cross on the top. In the body of the church are two gabled eaves dormers, and the south doorway is Norman in style.	I
Llanyblodwel Post Office; 52.79893°N 3.12513°W		1856–57	Originally a schoolmaster's house, later a post office, it was designed by Rev, John Parker in Gothic style. The building is in sandstone and has hipped slate roofs with stone finials. There are two storeys and a front of two gabled bays, the left containing a porch. Both floors contain rectangular chamfered windows, in the upper floor are paired lancets with quatrefoils, and in the ground floor are mullioned windows.	II
The Old School; 52.79888°N 3.12484°W	—	1856–57	The school, later a private house, was designed by Rev, John Parker in Gothic style. It is in sandstone and has a slate roof with stepped coped verges. Originally it had one storey, another storey has been inserted, there are buttresses and a decorated cornice. On the front is a two-light mullioned window, to the right an external chimney shaft, a four-light mullioned window with a double gable above, a narrow chamfered window, and a gabled porch with an inscription. At the west end is a window with Gothic tracery, an oval window with blind Gothic tracery, and above is a turret with a helm roof and a finial. The east end contains a stepped triple lancet window and an inserted rectangular window above.	II
Gate piers, gates and walls, The Old School and Llanyblodwel Post Office; 52.79903°N 3.12491°W	—	1856–57	The gate piers, gates and wall were designed by Rev, John Parker. The gate piers and walls are in sandstone, and the walls have embattled coping; they enclose the grounds of the two buildings and there is a section between them. The gates are in wrought iron.	II
Parker memorial 52.79829°N 3.12981°W	—	c. 1860	The memorial is in the churchyard of St Michael's Church, and is to the memory of Rev, John Parker. It is a pedestal tomb in limestone, and is in Gothic style. The tomb has a square base with corner piers, a top with a moulded string course, gables on each face, and on the top is an enriched Celtic cross.	II
Hamer memorial 52.79830°N 3.13006°W	—	c. 1864	The memorial is in the churchyard of St Michael's Church, and is to the memory of members of the Hamer family. It is an octagonal pedestal tomb in limestone, and is in Gothic style. The tomb has a stepped plinth, a traceried gable on the top of each face, between which are columns with floriated capitals and moulded bases, and with a steeple-like projection on the top. It is surrounded by four stone posts linked by cast iron chains.	II
Pump south of Brynfedwyn; 52.79104°N 3.13631°W	—	Mid to late 19th century	The pump is in cast iron. It has a plain ringed shaft, a fluted top with a domed cap and a pointed finial, a decorated spout and a slightly curved handle.	II
Smelt flue chimney 52.81026°N 3.08374°W	—	Late 19th century	The chimney is in red engineering brick, it has a square plan, and tapers to the top. The chimney has a stepped plinth and moulded capping. To the south are a segmental furnace arch and the remains of a brick-lined flue.	II
Morton War Memorial; 52.81440°N 3.05345°W	—	1920	The war memorial is in the churchyard of the Church of St Philip and St James. It is in Cornish granite, and consists of a square obelisk on a tapering plinth on a two-stepped base. On the plinth are inscriptions and the names of those lost in the two World Wars. The memorial is surrounded by chippings and a low kerb.	II
