= Dafydd ap Maredudd ap Tudur =

15th-century Welsh poet

Dafydd ap Maredudd ap Tudur was a Welsh poet in the later 15th century.

Tudur's works include religious poems, and eulogies of Dafydd ab Owain (abbot of Strata Marcella), Dafydd Deuddwr, Hywel Colunwy, and Watcyn ap Tomas ap Rhoser.
