= Llanyblodwel and Pant =

Coordinates: 52.799°N 3.127°W

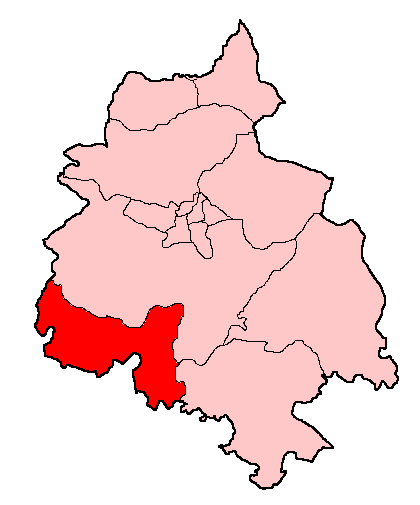
- Shown within Oswestry
- Population: 2,317 (2001)
- District: Oswestry
- Ceremonial county: Shropshire
- Region: West Midlands
- Country: England
- Sovereign state: United Kingdom

Llanyblodwel and Pant was a ward in the county of Shropshire.

== Abolition ==
With the re-organisation of local government in Shropshire in 2009 (i.e. the abolition of the borough of Oswestry and the creation of a unitary Shropshire Council) the ward was abolished and now forms part of a wider Llanymynech electoral division.

== Geography ==
The ward covered the villages of Pant, Llynclys, Porth-y-waen and Llanyblodwel, as well as half of Nantmawr and the English half of Llanymynech, and contained the two parishes of Llanyblodwel and Llanymynech and Pant. Despite being in England, almost without exception the villages and other settlements are named in Welsh, a vestige of the area's history as part of neighbouring Wales.

The terrain varies from flat farming land at an elevation of roughly 60 metres (200 ft) to the east of Llanymynech in the south, to rugged hills in the west reaching an elevation of roughly 310 metres (1,020 ft) to the north of Bryn.
