= Llanyblodwel =

Village in Shropshire, England

Coordinates: 52.798°N 3.126°W

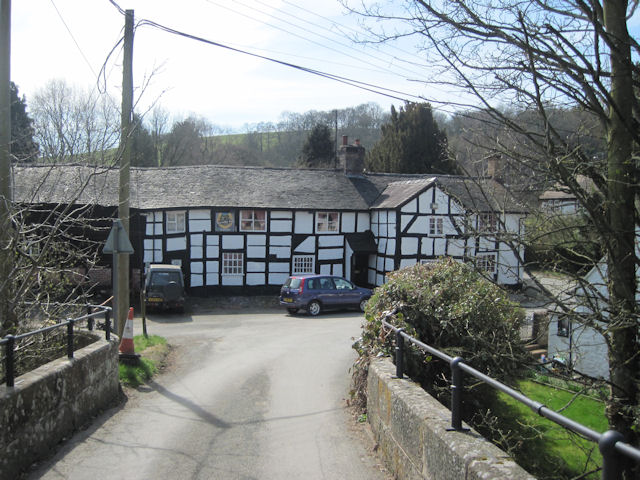
- The Horseshoe Inn and bridge across the Tanat, Llanyblodwel

- Location within Shropshire
- Population: 767 (2011)
- OS grid reference: SJ240229
- Civil parish: Llanyblodwel
- Unitary authority: Shropshire
- Ceremonial county: Shropshire
- Region: West Midlands
- Country: England
- Sovereign state: United Kingdom
- Post town: OSWESTRY
- Postcode district: SY10
- Dialling code: 01691
- Police: West Mercia
- Fire: Shropshire
- Ambulance: West Midlands
- UK Parliament: North Shropshire

Llanyblodwel is a village and civil parish in Shropshire, England; the spelling "Llanyblodwell" was commonly used in the past, and the village was sometimes simply referred to as "Blodwel". The population of the civil parish at the 2011 census was 767. It lies 7 miles (11 km) west of the nearest town, Oswestry, in the valley of the River Tanat. Simon Jenkins, in his guide to English churches says of Llanyblodwel that "the Welsh Marches are seldom so lovely as where the River Tanat crosses the border through the steep wooded valleys west of Oswestry."

The parish had a population of 817 at the time of the 2001 census. It was formerly in the Llanyblodwel and Pant ward of the borough of Oswestry. The village is located in a scenic rural area, with attractive views of the Welsh hills across the border. There were formerly several limestone quarries around Llanyblodwel, and limited quarrying still takes place.

== Etymology, history ==
Llan is a common term in Welsh toponymy, signifying an enclosure of holy land in Celtic Christianity. Therefore, Llanyblodwel may mean something like "the Llan at Blodwel", with a tributary of the Tanat being formerly known as the "Blodwell".

The church itself may have Norman origins. The parish, on which the boundaries of the current civil parish were based, included the townships of Blodwell, Abertanat, Bryn, Moreton, and Llynclys.

There was historically a strong Welsh cultural and linguistic influence in the area. In a lecture given in 1878, the geographer E G Ravenstein noted that of 2,469 inhabitants of the parishes of Selattyn and Llanyblodwel, 900 spoke Welsh. It was, however, declining at this time: "in Llanyblodwell Welsh preponderates [but] the children of Welsh parents are often unable to speak Welsh. The Welsh service in the parish church has been discontinued since 1875, owing to a paucity of attendance".

== Architecture ==
In the centre of the village is a listed narrow stone bridge over the Tanat, built in 1710.

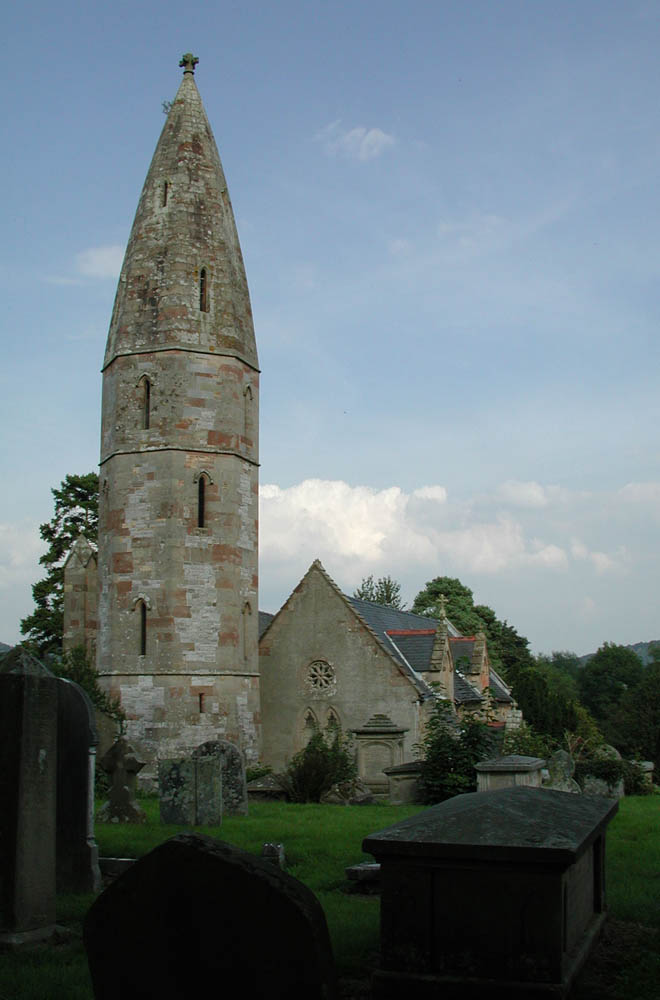
St Michael the Archangel church

The grade I listed parish church of St Michael the Archangel was heavily rebuilt in the mid 19th century to designs by its then-vicar, the Rev. John Parker. The design has been referred to in the Pevsner Architectural Guides as "bizarre", but "unforgettable", particularly the tower, which was apparently modelled on that of Freiburg Minster. On the other hand, Jenkins describes the church as having been built "for strength on a difficult site" and acknowledging that this was in no sense a scholarly work but "...hobby architecture, a Gothic Portmeirion." The interior is even more unconventional, with many texts and stencilled patterns. There is a 14th-century monumental slab in the south porch carved with a coursing hare, which some antiquaries have tried to connect with the hare iconography seen at Pennant Melangell, which once received the tithes of the township of Bryn. The church contains a memorial to Elias Owen (1833–1899), the Welsh antiquarian and author of "Welsh Folklore", published in 1887, who was incumbent at the church from 1892 until his death. There are also a number of monuments to the Tanat and Bridgeman families in the church.

Llanyblodwel's timber-framed pub, the Horse Shoe Inn, is of late-mediaeval date and like several other buildings in the village is grade II listed.

There was once a substantial manor house, the seat of the Tanat family, near to the village at Blodwell Hall. In the 15th century it had been the home of their ancestor, Gwerful ferch Madog, known as Gwerful Hael ("Gwerful the Bountiful") for her generosity and often mentioned in Welsh poetry of the time. Sir John Bridgeman, who had married Ursula Matthews, the heiress of the Tanat estate, constructed a new house on the site in around 1700, along with formal gardens. The site of the house is now occupied by a dairy farm, but an entrance gateway and a stone-built summerhouse dated 1718 still survive.

== Railways ==
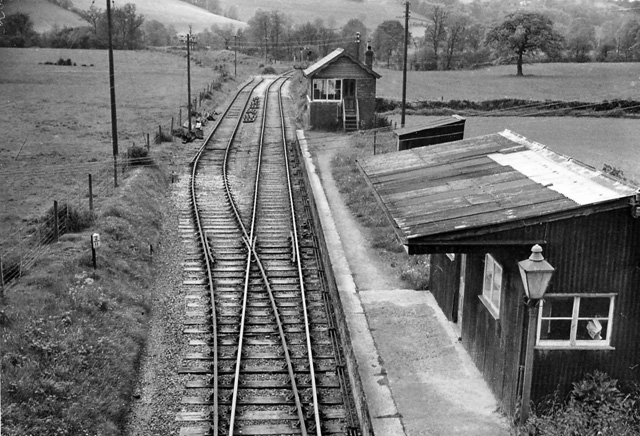
Blodwell Junction Station in 1962

Despite its remote rural location, the village was once served by a railway station (Llanyblodwell Halt) on the Tanat Valley Railway, and the Potteries, Shrewsbury and North Wales Railway also ran through the area, serving Blodwell Junction station 1-mile (1.6 km) east of the village. Part of the line was still used for quarry trains until 1988, and sections are currently in the process of being restored as a heritage railway.

The Cambrian Heritage Railway based in Oswestry applied for a Transport & Works Act Order for transfer of NR's residual rights to itself and this was granted on 28 February 2017. This permits the CHR to reopen the route from Gobowen to Blodwel Quarry subject to level crossings of the A5 and A483 being replaced by a tunnel and overbridge respectively.

== Notable residents ==
- John Parker (1798-1860), cleric and artist, was vicar of Llanyblodwel from 1844 to his death.
- Elias Owen (1833-1899), cleric and antiquarian, vicar of Llanyblodwel from 1892.
- John Biffen, Baron Biffen (1930-2007), Conservative politician, lived latterly in Llanyblodwell during his time as MP for North Shropshire.

== See also ==
- Listed buildings in Llanyblodwel
