= William Pierce Owen =

Welsh footballer

William Owen
Personal information
- Full name: William Pierce Owen
- Date of birth: 20 November 1860
- Place of birth: Wales
- Date of death: 13 December 1937 (aged 77)
- Position: Winger

Senior career*
Years	Team	Apps	(Gls)
?–1880–1884–?	Ruthin Town		

International career
1880–1884	Wales	12	(6)
- * Club domestic league appearances and goals

William Pierce Owen (20 November 1860 – 13 December 1937) was a Welsh professional footballer who played as a midfielder (winger, sometimes wing half) for Ruthin Town. He made a total of twelve appearances for Wales.

== Personal life ==
William was the second son of Rev. Elias Owen and older brother of the younger Elias Owen, who also played for Wales. After his playing career, William became a solicitor in Aberystwyth.

== Club career ==
Owen played with Ruthin Town, one of the leading teams in North Wales at that time. He was part of the Ruthin team that lost the final of the 1880 Welsh Cup against Druids.

== International appearances ==
Owen made his senior debut on 15 March 1880 and was part of the first Welsh team that achieved an international victory (0–1 against England in 1881). He scored six times in twelve appearances for Wales in official international matches, as follows:

Date	Venue	Opponent	Result (Note: Wales score first)	Goals	Competition
15 March 1880	Racecourse Ground, Wrexham	England	2–3	0	Friendly
27 March 1880	1st Hampden Park, Glasgow	Scotland	1–5	0	Friendly
26 February 1881	Alexandra Meadows, Blackburn	England	1–0	0	Friendly
14 March 1881	Racecourse Ground, Wrexham	Scotland	1–5	0	Friendly
25 February 1882	Racecourse Ground, Wrexham	Ireland	7–1	2	Friendly
13 March 1882	Racecourse Ground, Wrexham	England	5–3	2	Friendly
25 March 1882	1st Hampden Park, Glasgow	Scotland	0–5	0	Friendly
3 February 1883	Kennington Oval, London	England	0–5	0	Friendly
13 March 1883	Racecourse Ground, Wrexham	Scotland	0–3	0	Friendly
9 February 1884	Racecourse Ground, Wrexham	Ireland	6–0	2	British Home Championship
17 March 1884	Racecourse Ground, Wrexham	England	0–4	0	British Home Championship
29 March 1884	Cathkin Park, Glasgow	Scotland	1–4	0	British Home Championship

== Honours ==
Ruthin Town

- Welsh Cup finalist: 1880
