= Strata Marcella =

Medieval Welsh monastery

Strata Marcella Abbey
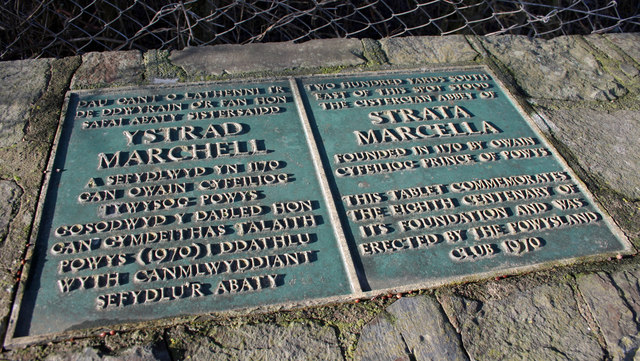
- Commemoration of eighth century of Abbey's foundation

- Strata Marcella Abbey shown within Wales

Religion
- Affiliation: Catholicism, Cistercians
- Ecclesiastical or organisational status: Ruin. Abbey dissolved 1536, stone sold to build local churches.
- Year consecrated: 1170

Location
- Location: Near Welshpool, Powys, Wales
- Coordinates: 52.686119°N 3.109249°W

Architecture
- Type: Monastery
- Style: Cistercian

Specifications
- Length: 273 ft (83 m)
- Width: 96 ft (29 m)

The Abbey of Strata Marcella (Welsh: Abaty Ystrad Marchell) was a medieval Cistercian monastery situated at Ystrad Marchell (Strata Marcella being the Latinised form of the Welsh name) on the west bank of the River Severn near Welshpool, Powys, Wales.

== Founding ==
The abbey lay within the diocese of St Asaph, and the abbey church was dedicated to the Virgin Mary. It was founded in 1170 by Owain Cyfeiliog Prince of Powys, as a daughter house of the Abbey at Whitland. Within two years the Abbey had moved a short distance to the present site but excavations have found no evidence of any early structures before construction in stone started in 1190 so it is likely the earliest buildings were simple wooden structures. Building work continued until the early 13th century, by which time Strata Marcella had become the largest Cistercian Abbey in Wales. Its nave was 200 feet long. It was monks from Strata Marcella who went to the Vale of Llangollen in 1200 to found the Abbey of Valle Crucis.

== Welsh Independence ==
Gerald of Wales tells of an abbot Enoc (c. 1190, possibly the founding abbot), who was guilty of misconduct with a nun and abandoned the habit. When advanced in years, Prince Owain retired to the monastery and took the habit of the Cistercian monks. On his death, in 1197, he was buried in the grounds of the abbey. His son Gwenwynwyn (ob. 1216) took over lordship of the abbey and increased its endowments; 45 charters, many from the Wynnstay Estate Archives, survive in the National Library of Wales and elsewhere recording such benefactions to the Abbey, and it became a religious house of wealth and importance. Owain's son Gruffyd ap Gwenwynwyn, lord of Powys, entered a monastery when he was close to death about 1260, but recovered during his stay; it is thought that this abbey was Strata Marcella, which was near his seat at Pool.

Strata Marcella was one of a number of Cistercian abbeys founded by Welsh princes which were independent of the Norman-founded abbeys in England. As such they tended to support the Welsh princes in their struggles against King Edward I of England and the Marcher Lords. Because of this the Abbey suffered much damage during the Welsh wars of independence, and by the fourteenth century was in a state of poverty. In 1332, the local feudal lord, John de Cherleton, accused the abbot and monks of working against English rule in Wales; he evicted all the Welsh monks, sending them to English houses, and replacing them with English monks from Buildwas Abbey in Shropshire.

== Owain Glyndŵr ==
During the Owain Glyndŵr rising at the beginning of the 15th century the buildings were heavily damaged and the monastery never completely recovered.

== The Dissolution ==
The abbey was finally closed in 1536 at the dissolution of the monasteries in England and Wales, when its income was valued at no more than £64 a year. At that time there were only four monks at the abbey and Edward Grey, the third Baron Grey of Powis, had already purchased the site and had removed everything of value. The stone from the buildings was sold and used to build several local churches, including a capital in the church of All Saints at Buttington. Today the only visible remains are a few courses of stones from the church and cloister in a meadow beside the infant River Severn.

== Excavations ==
The site was excavated in 1890 by Stephen W. Williams for the Powysland Club. The church had an overall length of 273 feet, with an aisled nave 201 feet long, transepts were 96 feet long with a short rectangular chancel, and a 30 ft square tower at the crossing. The long period of building was from c. 1190 till the early C14. There were buttresses, including clasping buttresses at the west end. The red sandstone columns of the ten-bay nave had the Early English pattern of shafts clustered on piers. Transitional and stiff-leaf capitals of great beauty reflect the sculptural developments between c. 1190 and c. 1210. Much of this space was occupied by two monks' choirs. It seems that the elaborate doorway to one of these may have been the original west doorway. Pier stones with 14th century wavy mouldings were found on the site of the tower. The cloister on the south was not excavated. Finds, including 13th century tiles and stone fragments, are in the Powysland Museum, Welshpool.

Recently, the site of Strata Marcella has been resurveyed by Clwyd-Powys Archaeological Trust and this has modified some of Stephen Williams' findings.

== Literature ==
- Silvester, R. J., Hankinson, R., Owen, W. and Jones, N. (2011) Medieval and Early Post-Medieval Monastic and Ecclesiastical Sites in East and North-East Wales:The Scheduling Enhancement Programme. Clwyd-Powys Archaeological Trust Report No 1090.
- Scourfield R. and Haslam R. (2013) The Buildings of Wales: Powys; Montgomeryshire, Radnorshire and Breconshire, Yale University Press.
- Thomas C. G. (ed), (1997) The charters of the Abbey of Ystrad Marchell. Aberystwyth : The National Library of Wales.
- Williams, D. H. (1992). An Appreciation of Stephen William Williams, Montgomeryshire Collections, Vol 80, 55–94
- Williams, D. H.(1995).The Exploration and Excavation of Cistercian Sites in Wales, Archaeologia Cambrensis, Vol 144, 1–25
- Williams, D. H. (2001). The Welsh Cistercians: written to commemorate the centenary of the death of Stephen William Williams (1837–1899), (The father of Cistercian archaeology in Wales). Gracewing Publishing. . ISBN 978-0-85244-354-5.
- Williams S. (1891), (with Jones M C), Excavations on the site of Strata Marcella Abbey, Montgomeryshire Collections, Vol 25.
