= Elias Owen (footballer) =

Welsh footballer

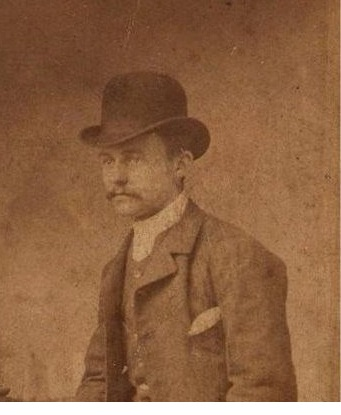

Personal information
- Date of birth: 1st qtr 1863
- Place of birth: Llanllechid, Wales
- Date of death: 20 September 1888
- Place of death: Efenechtyd, Wales
- Position: Goalkeeper

Senior career*
Years	Team	Apps	(Gls)
1880–1885	Ruthin School		

International career
1884	Wales	3	(0)
- * Club domestic league appearances and goals

Elias Owen (1863 – 20 September 1888) was a Welsh amateur footballer who made three appearances as a goalkeeper for the Wales national team in 1884. He killed himself while depressed over the outcome of his college final examinations.

== Family and education ==
Owen was born in the first quarter of 1863 at Llanllechid, near Bangor where his father, also Elias, was headmaster of the National School. Elias Jr. was one of 13 children of the marriage between Elias Sr. (1833–1899) and Margaret Pierce (1839–fl.1901). Later in life, Elias Sr. was a schools inspector and an eminent antiquarian.

Elias's elder brother, William Pierce Owen, also played for Wales, as did his cousins, Morgan and Hugh Morgan-Owen.

Owen attended Ruthin Grammar School between 1880 and 1885 before going up to Lampeter College, where he studied theology.

In 1886, he married Zillah Parry (1861–1907), who was the daughter of Thomas, a farm bailiff, and Elizabeth Parry. The couple lived with his parents in the rectory at Efenechtyd, a few miles south of Ruthin, Denbighshire and had two children, William Parry Owen, born on 18 May 1887 and Eva Margaret Owen, born at Bontuchel, a village about two miles west of Ruthin, on 24 June 1888.

== Football career ==
At Ruthin School, Owen played football, initially as a half-back before becoming a goalkeeper in 1882. Regular custodian was unavailable for a match between Denbighshire and Liverpool F.A.; Owen was selected and took the opportunity to impress the selectors from the Football Association of Wales who called him up for Wales's first match in the inaugural British Home Championship against Ireland.

His international debut came at Wrexham's Racecourse Ground on 9 February 1884; Wales ran out comfortable victors with a score of 6–0 with two goals each from Owen's brother William and Edward Shaw.

Owen retained his place for the next match six weeks later against England. The Welsh team "had few answers to the skilful England forwards" who won the match 4–0, including two goals from William Bromley-Davenport. Despite the defeat by the English, Owen was praised for "acquitting himself admirably . . . in important contests it will be a difficult matter to entrust the important task of defending goal to a more competent player".

Owen's final international appearance came against Scotland on 29 March 1884. The Scottish team were weakened by the absence of players from Queen's Park who were playing in the FA Cup Final in London on the same day. The Scottish team were considered to be "about the weakest combination ever chosen to represent Scotland in an international fixture". Although the scores were level 1–1 at half-time, the Scots ran in three goals in the second half, including two from John Kay, the only Queen's Park player in the Scottish side, and the match ended in a 4–1 victory for the Scots.

By the next round of international matches a year later, Owen had been dropped from the selectors' plans, with Robert Mills-Roberts being preferred.

=== International appearances ===
Owen made three appearances for Wales as follows:

Date	Venue	Opponent	Result	Goals	Competition
9 February 1884	Racecourse Ground, Wrexham	Ireland	6–0	0	British Home Championship
17 March 1884	Racecourse Ground, Wrexham	England	0–4	0	British Home Championship
29 March 1884	Cathkin Park, Glasgow	Scotland	1–4	0	British Home Championship

Win	Draw	Loss

== Death ==
In September 1888, Owen returned from Lampeter College to the family home at Efenechtyd. Official sources say that he was depressed over the results of his final examinations, although family sources claim that he was depressed because his wife was having an affair. On the evening of 19 September, he returned home late to the rectory where he was admitted by his sister, Mary. Some time after midnight, Owen went out into the churchyard where next morning he was discovered by Mary and another sister, Maggie, hanging from a pair of reins attached to a yew tree. Although he was still breathing when he was cut down from the tree, he died shortly afterwards. At the coroner's inquest, the jury found that "the deceased committed suicide during temporary insanity" brought on by "great depression of spirits".

Following the death of her husband, Zillah moved away and became a "charwoman" in Manchester before moving to London where she remarried. Following the death of her second husband in 1898, she ended up in the workhouse in Fulham Road, Chelsea where she died in 1907.

Following the suicide of his father and the disappearance of his mother, William was brought up by other members of the Owen family. In 1922, he and his wife emigrated to Western Australia where they settled on a farm south of Fremantle. On Christmas Day 1937, William was killed when he was gored by a boar.

Eva was sent to live with family friends, Robert and Maria Jones, at Llanfwrog before "entering service" at Llanbedr Hall (home of the Calvert family), near Ruthin. Llanbedr Hall later became a tuberculosis sanatorium where Eva worked as a nursemaid. In 1914, she married Maurice Robert Jones; the couple had seven children. Maurice died at Wrexham in 1946 and Eva in 1972.
