= Montgomeryshire Collections =

Montgomeryshire Collections (Welsh: Casgliadau Maldwyn) is the annual journal of the Powysland Club, containing scholarly articles on archaeological and historical topics relating to Powys, book reviews, and society notes. It was first published under the title Collections Historical & Archaeological relating to Montgomeryshire, 1868 (vol. 1) – 1942 (vol. 47); it then changed its name to Montgomeryshire Collections: relating to Montgomeryshire and its borders, 1943 (vol. 48) – present.

The journal has been digitised by the Welsh Journals Online project at the National Library of Wales.
