= Moelyci Environmental Centre =

Moelyci Environmental Centre (Welsh: Canolfan Amgylcheddol Moelyci) is a community project based near the village of Tregarth, in the county of Gwynedd in north-west Wales.

== The Centre ==
Moelyci Environmental Centre is run as an industrial and provident society (IPS). The aim of which is to establish an environmental centre devoted to local community regeneration, the promotion of co-operative community activities and to local community education. Moelyci Farm comprises 92 acres (370,000 m^{2}) of in-bye land with a farmhouse and several substantial outbuildings. To the south of the farm is a further 38 acres (150,000 m^{2}) of ffridd and 217 acres (0.88 km^{2}) of heather moorland.

The Centre aims to run economically viable projects related to waste management, organic farming, recreation and other ecologically focused activities. There is a particular emphasis placed upon social inclusion, involving and employing the disadvantaged and people with disabilities.
