= Mellington =

Mellington is a surname. Notable people with the surname include:

- Anthony Mellington (born 1974), Australian rules footballer
- Josh Mellington (born 1992), Australian rules footballer
