= Hugh Morgan-Owen =

Welsh footballer

Personal information
- Date of birth: 1882
- Place of birth: St Asaph, Flintshire, Wales
- Date of death: 6 March 1953 (aged 70–71)
- Place of death: Repton, Derbyshire, England

International career
Years	Team	Apps	(Gls)
1900–1907	Wales	5	(2)

Hugh John Morgan-Owen (1882 – 6 March 1953) was a Welsh international footballer.

Morgan-Owen was born at St Asaph, Flintshire, son of Timothy Morgan-Owen, and educated at Shrewsbury School and Oxford University, where he was a football Blue against Cambridge University. Later he played in London for the Corinthians.

Morgan-Owen was part of the Wales national football team between 1900 and 1907, playing 5 matches and scoring 2 goals. He played his first match on 26 March 1900 against England and his last match on 4 March 1907 against Scotland.

Morgan-Owen also played cricket at county level for Montgomeryshire and, in 1904, for Shropshire on one occasion when he made 23 runs and took two wickets.

His brother Morgan Morgan-Owen was also a Welsh international footballer.
