= Powysland Club =

Historical society for Montgomeryshire

- Founded: 1867
- Location: Welshpool
- Region served: Powys
- Key people: John Herbert, 8th Earl of Powis, president
- Website: https://www.powyslandclub.co.uk

The Powysland Club is a historical society for the county of Montgomeryshire, Wales. It was founded in 1867. Among the society's members was Elias Owen, the antiquarian who served as a committee member and published articles in the club's journal, The Montgomeryshire Collections between 1871 and 1899. Members of the club founded the first Powysland Museum in 1874. Welshpool Town Council took over the museum in 1930.

It holds several annual educational lectures and excursions to sites of historical interest. The club also publishes an annual journal, Montgomeryshire Collections. It also maintains a library, which is open to the general public, in Welshpool.
