= John Parker (cleric) =

Welsh cleric and artist (1798–1860)

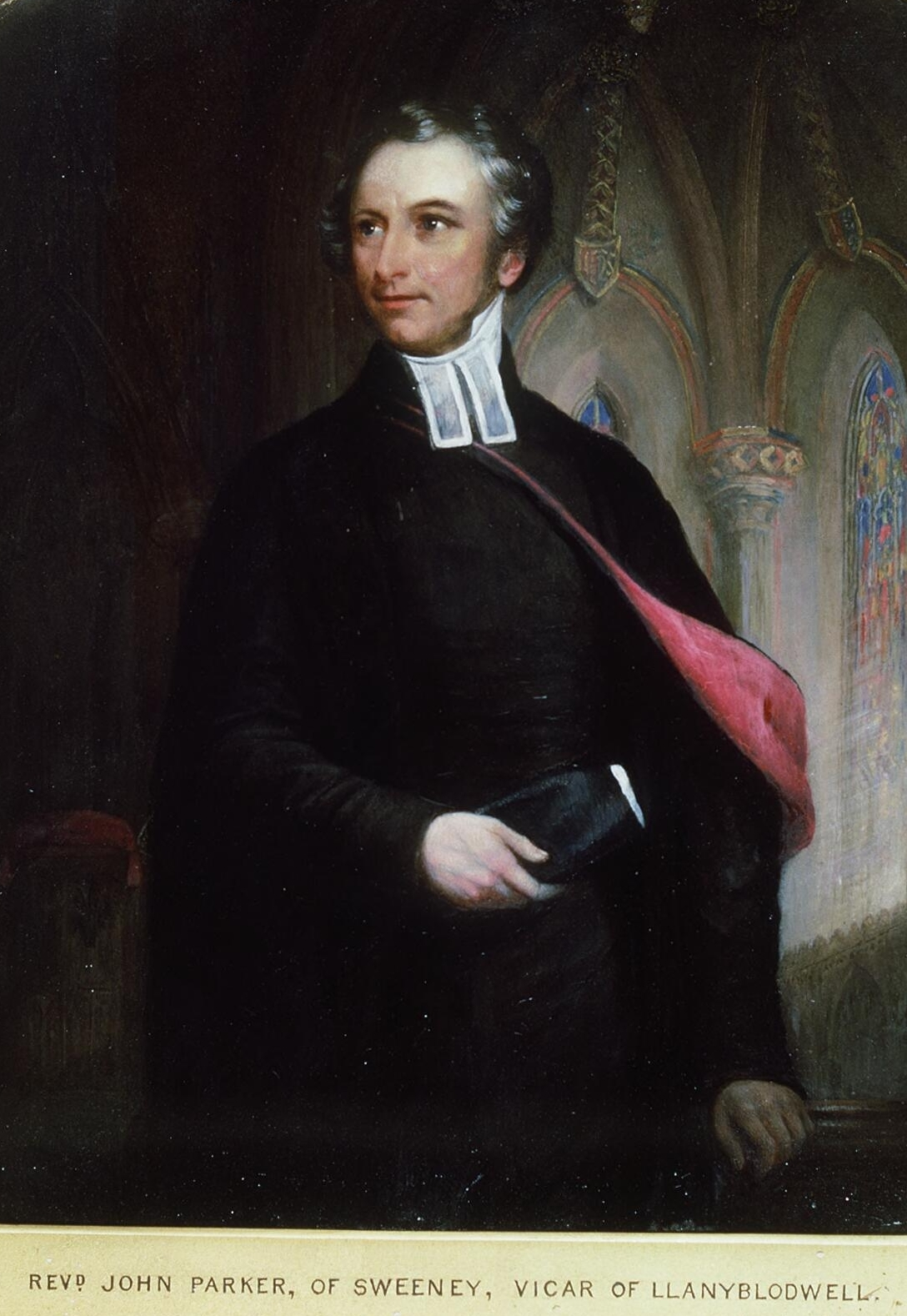
- Born: 3 October 1798
- Died: 31 August 1860 (aged 61)
- Occupations: cleric and artist
- Known for: St Michael the Archangel, Llanyblodwel, church design.
- Notable work: Poem "The Passengers: Containing, the Celtic Annals."

John Parker (3 October 1798 – 31 August 1860) was a Welsh cleric and artist.

== Biography ==
He was second son of Thomas Netherton Parker and his wife Sarah Browne of Sweeney Hall, Oswestry, Shropshire, and was educated at Eton College and Oriel College, Oxford (B.A. 1820, M.A. 1825). Author of poem "The Passengers: Containing, the Celtic Annals.", published 1831. He served successively as a Church of England priest, as curate of Moreton near Oswestry in Shropshire, briefly as rector of Llanmerewig, Montgomeryshire, and from 1844 to his death as vicar of Llanyblodwel in Shropshire.

== St Michael the Archangel, Llanyblodwel ==
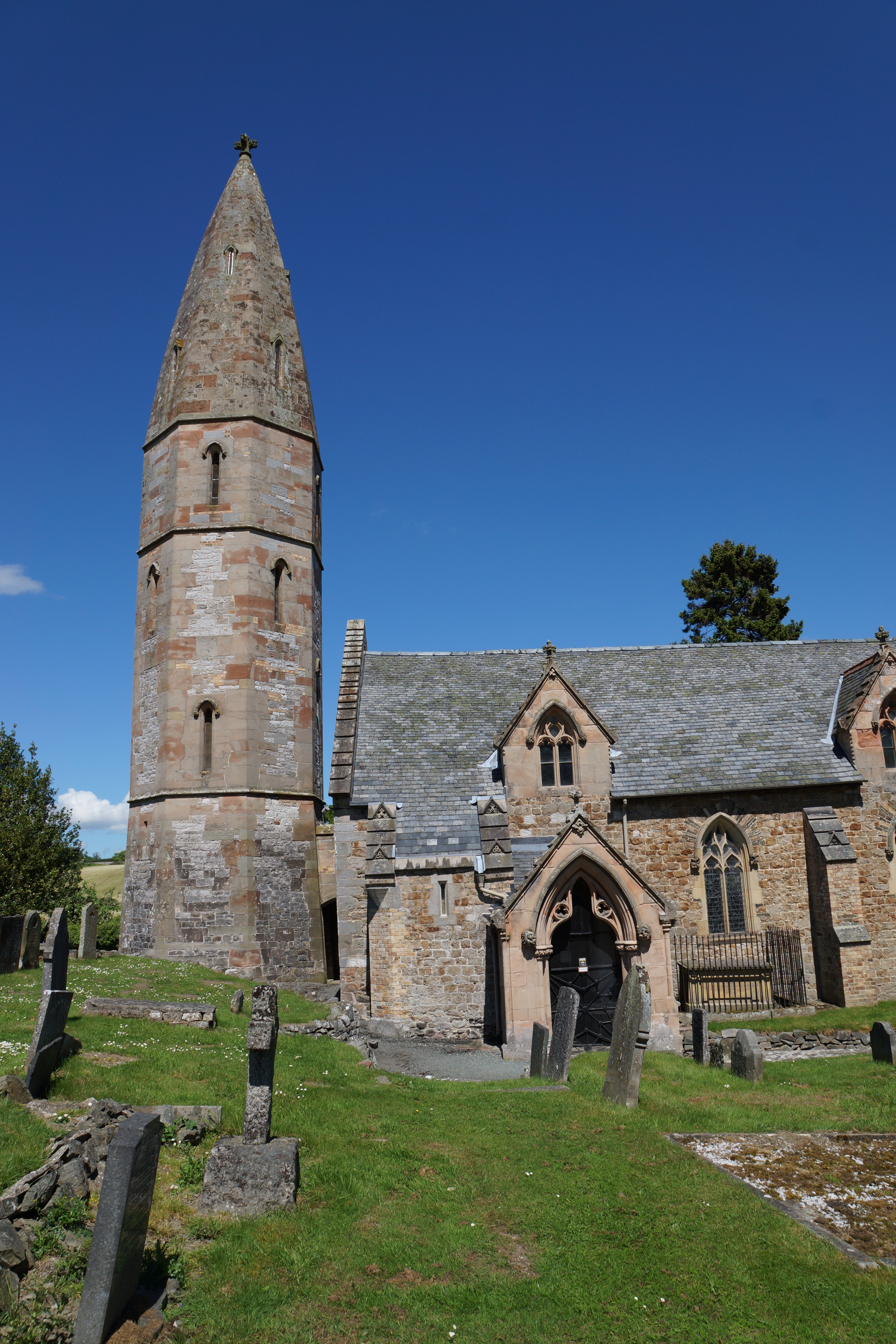
St Michael the Archangel

St Michael the Archangel is a Grade I listed church located in Llanyblodwel in Shropshire, England near England–Wales border. It has a spire of unusual shape and was designed in 1847–1856 by Parker during his time as its vicar. St Michael the Archangel was designed and rebuilt from a medieval church in stages between 1847 and 1853. He designed the porches, ceilings, windows and reredos. The idiosyncratic almost detached steeple was designed and added 1855-6 by the same vicar, who also designed and built the two nearby listed buildings comprising the school house and schoolmaster's house (at one time used as the post office). The design has been referred to in the Pevsner Architectural Guides as "bizarre", but "unforgettable", particularly the tower, which was apparently modelled on that of Freiburg Minster. The interior is even more unconventional, with many texts and stencilled patterns.

John Parker was buried in Llanyblodwel churchyard.

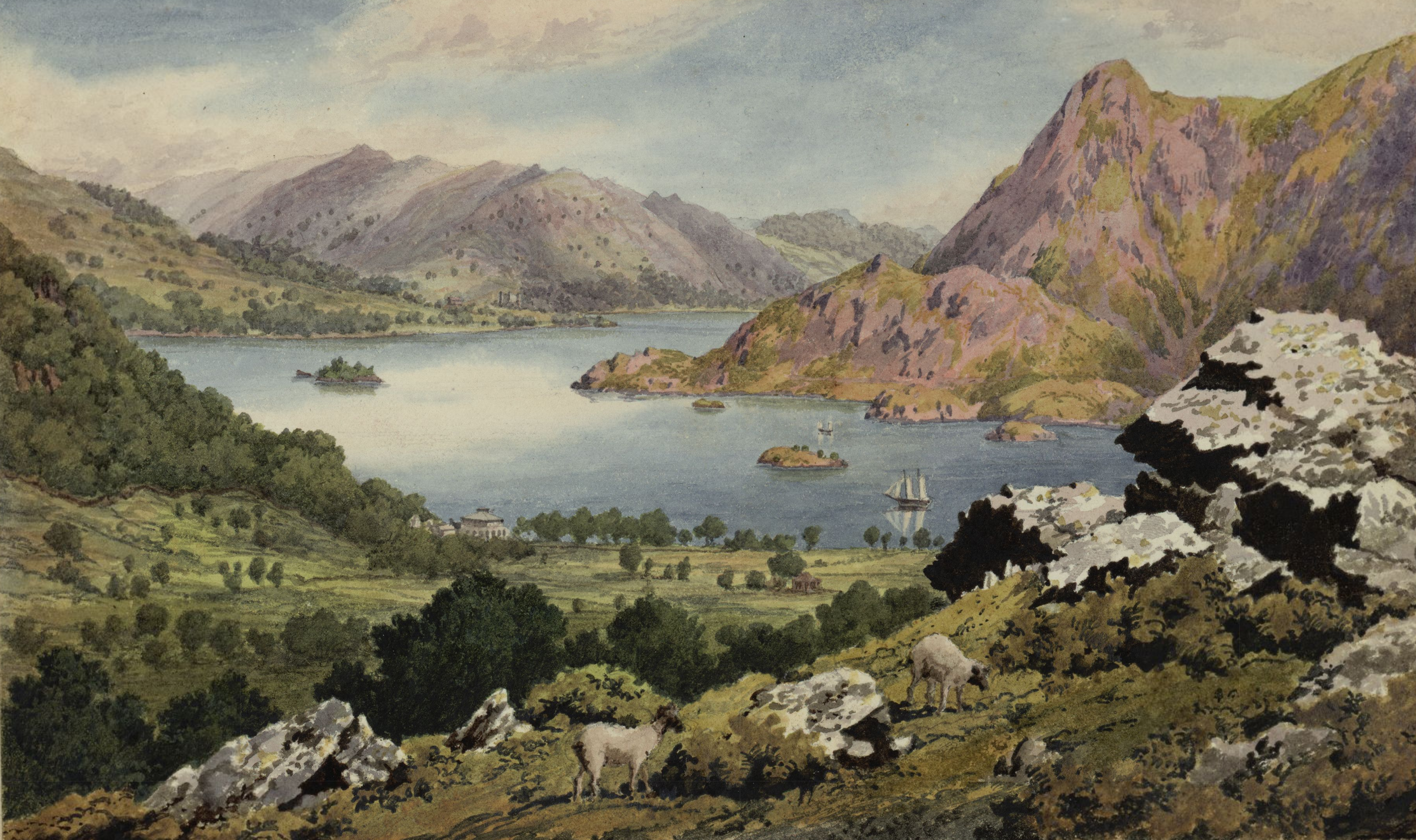
Ullswater painted by John Parker 1825
