= List of hillforts in Wales =

This is a list of hillforts in Wales.

== Anglesey ==
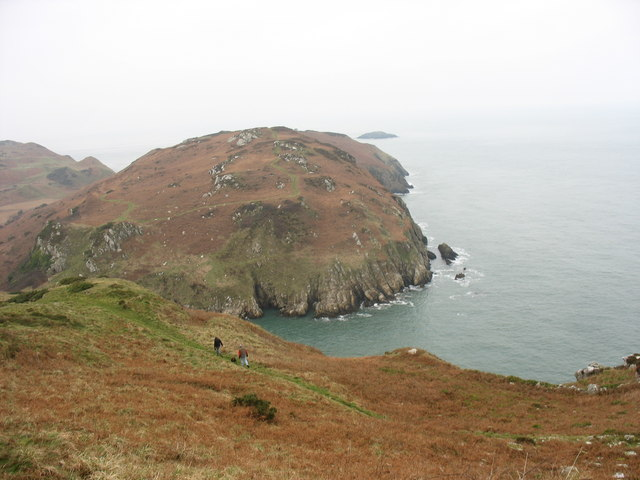
Dinas Gynfor

- Din Sylwy (Bwrdd Arthur) (53.3108°N 4.1229°W), contour fort
- Caer Idris Hillfort (53.1874°N 4.2546°W), promontory fort
- Caer y Twr (53.3141°N 4.6742°W), partial contour fort
- Dinas Gynfor (53.4274°N 4.4236°W), promontory fort
- Dinas Porth Ruffydd (53.2819°N 4.6673°W), promontory fort
- Mynydd Llwydiarth (53.2832°N 4.1949°W), promontory fort
- Parciau hill fort (53.3374°N 4.2627°W), promontory fort
- Tan-y-graig, Llanffinan (53.2684°N 4.2439°W), contour fort
- Twyn-y-Parc (53.1568°N 4.4414°W), promontory fort
- Y Werthyr hillfort (53.2758°N 4.4391°W), marsh fort
- Y Werthyr, Llanddeusant (53.3303°N 4.4594°W), contour fort
- Ynys-y-Fydlyn (53.3949°N 4.5705°W), promontory fort

== Bridgend County Borough ==
- Cae Summerhouse Camp (51.4894°N 3.6375°W), partial contour fort
- Chapel Hill Camp, Merthyr Mawr House (51.4906°N 3.6018°W), contour fort
- Coed-y-Mwstwr (51.5179°N 3.5242°W), contour fort
- Cwm Llwyd (51.5565°N 3.5178°W), partial contour fort
- Mynydd Twmpathyddaer (51.5103°N 3.6722°W), contour fort
- Mynydd y Gaer (51.5544°N 3.482°W), partial contour fort
- Pen y Castell, Kenfig Hill (51.5312°N 3.6704°W), contour fort
- Y Bwlwarcau (51.5839°N 3.6771°W), multiple enclosure hillfort
- Y Bwlwarcau, Eastern Enclosure (51.5851°N 3.6589°W), hillslope fort

== Caerphilly County Borough ==
- Ruperra hill fort (51.5738°N 3.1226°W), contour fort
- Mynydd Twmbarlwm (51.627654°N 3.093715°W), contour fort, motte and bailey castle Cadw ref MM044

== Carmarthenshire ==
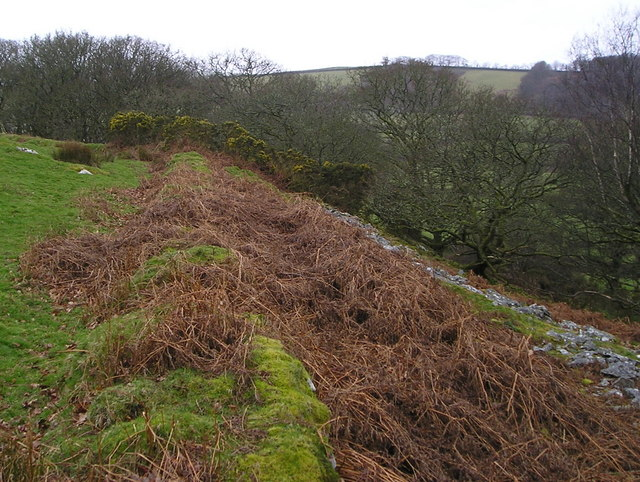
Caer Gwrtheyrn

- Allt Abercothi (51.8668°N 4.1708°W), promontory fort
- Allt Clog-y-fran (51.8094°N 4.5508°W), promontory fort
- Allt y Ferin (51.8884°N 4.1491°W), promontory fort
- Allt-y-Cnap (51.8438°N 4.3313°W), partial contour fort
- Banc y Rhyfel (51.9184°N 4.1231°W), partial contour fort
- Blaen-maes, Pencarreg (52.0868°N 4.1287°W), contour fort
- Cae Castell, Llangathen (51.9066°N 4.0444°W), promontory fort
- Cae'r Castell, Llanarthney (51.8571°N 4.1627°W), promontory fort
- Caer Blaen Minog (51.9951°N 4.3861°W), promontory fort
- Caerau Clungwyn (51.8871°N 4.3103°W), promontory fort
- Careg Llwyd (51.6953°N 4.2856°W), promontory fort
- Carnawllon-Fawr (51.7671°N 4.1918°W), promontory fort
- Carreg Cegyn (51.8915°N 3.9322°W), contour fort
- Castell Bron Niwl (51.8783°N 4.4722°W), hillslope fort
- Castell Elwyn (52.0728°N 4.0955°W), hillslope fort
- Castell Gorwyn (51.9074°N 4.4598°W), hillslope fort
- Castell Henfryn (52.027°N 4.3557°W), partial contour fort
- Castell Mawr, Llanwinio (51.9168°N 4.552°W), promontory fort
- Castell Mawr, Trelech-a'r-Bettws (51.92°N 4.5151°W), partial contour fort
- Castell Pant y Fen (52.0383°N 4.2443°W), level terrain fort
- Castell Pen-y-Coed (51.7861°N 4.5456°W), promontory fort
- Castell Pyr, Llanllwni (52.0372°N 4.2339°W), promontory fort
- Castell y Waun (51.8348°N 4.4484°W), contour fort
- Castell-y-Gaer, Newchurch (51.8497°N 4.4054°W), contour fort
- Castell, Pencader (52.0038°N 4.2614°W), promontory fort
- Castle Lloyd Camp (51.7552°N 4.5495°W), promontory fort
- Cefn Crug (52.0046°N 3.77°W), promontory fort
- Cefn Gaer (51.9769°N 3.8953°W), contour fort
- Cefnbenydd (51.9773°N 3.87°W), contour fort
- Cencoed (51.7045°N 4.204°W), promontory fort
- Cilcrug (51.8921°N 4.3702°W), partial contour fort
- Clog-y-Fran (51.8137°N 4.5455°W), partial contour fort
- Court Wood (51.6955°N 4.2817°W), contour fort
- Coygan Camp (51.7546°N 4.4873°W), contour fort
- Craig Gwrtheyrn (52.0386°N 4.2858°W), hillfort
- Croes Arthur (51.91°N 4.2315°W), level terrain fort
- Cwm-Felin Boeth (51.8411°N 4.6305°W), partial contour fort
- Dan Lan y Castell (51.8244°N 4.3753°W), contour fort
- Danycerrig (51.9053°N 4.2894°W), contour fort
- Dinas Fawr, Llangeler (52.0228°N 4.4132°W), hillslope fort
- Dinefwr Castle (51.8768°N 4.0175°W), contour fort
- Dryslwyn Castle (51.8632°N 4.1007°W), contour fort
- Gaer Fawr, Manordeilo (51.938°N 3.9904°W), contour fort
- Gelli Diogyn (51.8623°N 4.6176°W), partial contour fort
- Gilman Point and Napps Circle (51.7392°N 4.5676°W), promontory fort
- Glan-y-Mor Fort, Laugharne (51.7736°N 4.4563°W), hillslope fort
- Grongaer, Llangathen (51.8747°N 4.0734°W), contour fort
- Hafod Camp (51.8729°N 4.5899°W), promontory fort
- Llansteffan Castle (51.7655°N 4.3908°W), promontory fort
- Llwyndu Camp (51.9031°N 3.9215°W), contour fort
- Maes Ifan (51.9457°N 4.0758°W), promontory fort
- Maes y Castell (51.9331°N 3.992°W), partial contour fort
- Mandinam (51.9369°N 3.8369°W), contour fort
- Merlin's Hill (51.8707°N 4.246°W), contour fort
- Moat Farm Camp (51.7241°N 4.264°W), promontory fort
- Parc Cynog Farm (51.7596°N 4.5305°W), level terrain fort
- Parc y Gaer, Carmarthen (51.8758°N 4.3054°W), hillslope fort
- Parc-Castell, Llangeler (52.0025°N 4.3088°W), promontory fort
- Parc-y-Gaer, Abergwili (51.9025°N 4.22198°W), promontory fort
- Parc-y-Gaer, Colston (51.7637°N 4.5246°W), promontory fort
- Pen y Gaer Fawr, Penlan (51.8589°N 4.5282°W), contour fort
- Pen y Gaer, Llanybydder (52.0695°N 4.155°W), contour fort
- Pen y Gaer, Sarnau (51.862°N 4.4557°W), promontory fort
- Pen-y-Gaer, Abernant (51.8827°N 4.3901°W), promontory fort
- Pen-y-Gaer, Meidrim (51.8462°N 4.4594°W), partial contour fort
- Pen-y-Gar, Llanpumsaint (51.9243°N 4.3368°W), promontory fort
- Pen-y-Garn (51.8513°N 4.0684°W), partial contour fort
- Pencaerau-bach (51.8858°N 4.4384°W), promontory fort
- Pencastell, Llanwinio (51.9317°N 4.5365°W), promontory fort
- Sugar Loaf (52.0711°N 3.7014°W), contour fort
- Tal-y-Fan, Llandeilofawr (51.9179°N 3.9728°W), hillslope fort
- Top Castle (51.739°N 4.6162°W), partial contour fort
- Waun-y-Castell (51.854°N 4.0057°W), contour fort
- Woodreefe Castle (51.7459°N 4.6314°W), promontory fort
- Y Fan (51.9655°N 3.9303°W), contour fort
- Y Gaer Fach (51.9013°N 3.9119°W), contour fort
- Y Gaer Wen (52.0024°N 4.3391°W), contour fort
- Y Gaer, Pencarreg (52.0785°N 4.0598°W), contour fort
- Y Garn Goch (51.902°N 3.9037°W), contour fort
- Yr Hen Castell, Llanfihangel-ar-arth (52.0452°N 4.3042°W), partial contour fort

== Ceredigion ==
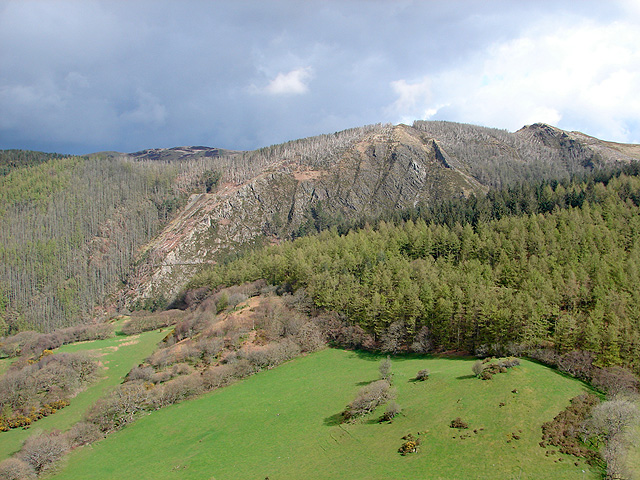
Esgair Nantyrarian

- Alltfadog South (52.4165°N 3.975°W), contour fort
- Bronfre-ganol (52.2058°N 4.2097°W), contour fort
- Bryn Maen Caerau, Cellan (52.1157°N 4.0504°W), marsh fort
- Caer Allt-goch (52.4763°N 4.0023°W), contour fort
- Caer Argoed (52.3197°N 4.0321°W), partial contour fort
- Caer Cadwgan, Cellan (52.1125°N 4.0132°W), contour fort
- Caer Lletty-llwyd (52.4753°N 3.9877°W), partial contour fort
- Caer Llifry (52.1866°N 4.173°W), contour fort
- Caer Pwll-Glas (52.4607°N 4.0125°W), partial contour fort
- Caerau, Henllan (52.0359°N 4.3954°W), promontory fort
- Capel Bangor Camp (52.4084°N 3.9743°W), contour fort
- Castell Allt-goch (52.1314°N 4.0562°W), hillfort
- Castell Bach, Cwm Tydi (52.1967°N 4.4003°W), promontory fort
- Castell Bach, Llanrhystyd (52.29871°N 4.1449°W), contour fort
- Castell Bach, Penbryn (52.154°N 4.4826°W), promontory fort
- Castell Blaen-Igau (52.129°N 4.4242°W), promontory fort
- Castell Bwa-drain Camp (52.398°N 3.893°W), contour fort
- Castell Cadwaladr (52.305°N 4.125°W), contour fort
- Castell Crugiau (52.1494°N 4.4073°W), contour fort
- Castell Cwmere (52.1687°N 4.1463°W), promontory fort
- Castell Disgwylfa (52.3453°N 3.9282°W), contour fort
- Castell Flemish hillfort (52.2505°N 3.97281°W), contour fort
- Castell Goetre (52.1392°N 4.0426°W), contour fort
- Castell Goginan Fach (52.419°N 3.9204°W), promontory fort
- Castell Grogwynion (52.3356°N 3.8782°W), partial contour fort
- Castell Gwynionydd (52.0544°N 4.3001°W), partial contour fort
- Castell Mawr (52.2965°N 4.1458°W), contour fort
- Castell Moeddyn (52.145°N 4.2157°W), contour fort
- Castell Moeddyn Fach (52.1399°N 4.2299°W), promontory fort
- Castell Nadolig (52.1257°N 4.4868°W), contour fort
- Castell Nantperchellan (52.0582°N 4.6661°W), promontory fort
- Castell Olwen (52.1233°N 4.0755°W), contour fort
- Castell Perthi-mawr (52.2093°N 4.1553°W), multiple enclosure hillfort
- Castell Rhyfel (52.2224°N 3.8577°W), contour fort
- Castell Tregaron (52.2241°N 3.9238°W), promontory fort
- Castell-Careg-Wen (52.357°N 3.9275°W), promontory fort
- Cefn Blewog Camp (52.3348°N 3.9137°W), partial contour fort
- Clyn-yr-Ynys (52.1252°N 4.6738°W), hillslope fort
- Cnwc y Bugail (52.3483°N 3.9285°W), contour fort
- Coed Allt-fedw Camp (52.338°N 3.9673°W), contour fort
- Coed Ty'n-y-Cwm (52.34615°N 3.92322°W), partial contour fort
- Coed-Parc Gaer (52.1433°N 4.0641°W), hillslope fort
- Cribyn Clotas (52.142°N 4.1404°W), hillfort
- Cribyn Gaer (52.1361°N 4.1638°W), contour fort
- Crug-y-balog (52.0806°N 4.4213°W), contour fort
- Crugllwyn Camp (52.1046°N 4.6268°W), promontory fort
- Cwm Castell (52.1758°N 4.2398°W), contour fort
- Dinas Cerdin (52.0975°N 4.358°W), contour fort
- Dinas, Melindwr (52.4333°N 3.851°W), contour fort
- Esgair Nant-yr-arian (52.4171°N 3.8982°W), promontory fort
- Foel y Mwnt (52.1371°N 4.6418°W), promontory fort
- Gaer Fawr (52.3284°N 3.9844°W), contour fort
- Gaer Lwyd (52.1437°N 4.4838°W), partial contour fort
- Gaer Pwntan (52.116°N 4.4965°W), contour fort
- Gaer Rhydlydan (52.1484°N 4.296°W), contour fort
- Gaer Wen, Pen-y-graig (52.0987°N 4.3427°W), promontory fort
- Gaer-Wen, Llangranog (52.1801°N 4.4202°W), partial contour fort
- Gaer, Brongwyn (52.0572°N 4.4941°W), contour fort
- Gaer, Llandygwydd (52.06°N 4.5602°W), level terrain fort
- Gilfach-Hafel Camp (52.3097°N 4.115°W), contour fort
- Graig y Gwbert (52.1195°N 4.691°W), promontory fort
- Hen Gaer, Bow Street (52.4403°N 4.0127°W), contour fort
- Llangranog (52.1576°N 4.4705°W), promontory fort
- Lletty-evan-hen (52.4455°N 3.9297°W), hillfort
- Mynachlog-Uchaf (52.1446°N 4.3282°W), hillslope fort
- New Cross Camp (52.3749°N 4.0162°W), contour fort
- Old Warren Hill (52.3889°N 4.0363°W), promontory fort
- Pant y Bula (52.0719°N 4.4577°W), promontory fort
- Pen Clawdd-mawr (52.177°N 4.1147°W), promontory fort
- Pen Coed-foel Camp (52.061°N 4.299°W), contour fort
- Pen Dinas (52.403°N 4.0825°W), contour fort
- Pen Dinas, Elerch (52.4712°N 3.9489°W), contour fort
- Pen-y-Bannau (52.2855°N 3.846°W), partial contour fort
- Pen-y-Darren (52.429°N 3.9447°W), contour fort
- Pen-y-Felin Wynt Hillfort (52.3867°N 3.9389°W), promontory fort
- Pen-y-Frwydd Llwyd Camp, Craig Ystradmeurig (52.3019°N 3.8943°W), contour fort
- Pen-y-Gaer, Llanbadarn (52.2288°N 3.9928°W), contour fort
- Pen-y-Gaer, Nantcwnlle (52.2048°N 4.0832°W), partial contour fort
- Pendinas Lochtyn (52.1662°N 4.4641°W), contour fort
- Penrhyn Coch Camp (52.4376°N 3.9753°W), partial contour fort
- Tan-y-ffordd (52.4005°N 3.923°W), partial contour fort
- Tre-Coll (52.2416°N 3.9913°W), promontory fort
- Trwyn Crou (52.1738°N 4.4405°W), promontory fort
- Y Gaer, Caron-uwch-clawdd (52.2802°N 3.8751°W), contour fort
- Y Gaer, Ciliau Aeron (52.2044°N 4.1972°W), hillslope fort
- Ynys Lochtyn (52.1708°N 4.4668°W), promontory fort

== City and County of Cardiff ==
- Caerau Hillfort (51.46811°N 3.24612°W), contour fort
- Castle Field Camp, Graig-llwyn (51.5494°N 3.1486°W), partial contour fort
- Llwynda'-ddu (51.5209°N 3.2861°W), contour fort
- Wenallt Camp (51.5373°N 3.2239°W), hillslope fort

== City and County of Swansea ==
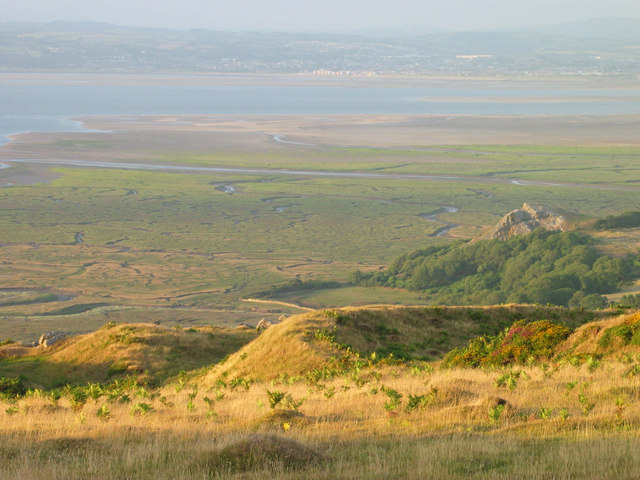
The Bulwark

- Berry Wood (51.5742°N 4.2058°W), hillslope fort
- Bishopston Valley Camp (51.5709°N 4.0659°W), promontory fort
- Burry Holms (51.6094°N 4.3135°W), promontory fort
- Carn Nicholas (51.6322°N 3.9151°W), hillslope fort
- Cilifor Top (51.6098°N 4.1594°W), contour fort
- Crawley Rocks, Nicholston Burrows (51.571°N 4.1387°W), promontory fort
- Deborah's Hole Camp (51.5545°N 4.2633°W), promontory fort
- Fforestnewydd (51.6961°N 3.9745°W), level terrain fort
- Graig Fawr, Pontardulais (51.7433°N 4.0027°W), contour fort
- Gron Gaer (51.6329°N 4.096°W), partial contour fort
- Harding's Down West Camp (51.59399°N 4.2615°W), contour fort
- Harding's Down, East Camp (51.5929°N 4.2577°W), partial contour fort
- Harding's Down, North Camp (51.5945°N 4.25854°W), hillslope fort
- Hen Gastell, Pen-Clawdd (51.6422°N 4.0906°W), hillslope fort
- High Pennard (51.5603°N 4.0674°W), promontory fort
- Horse Cliff Camp (51.5515°N 4.2586°W), promontory fort
- Lewes Castle Promontory Fort, Rhossili (51.5625°N 4.2888°W), promontory fort
- Llanddewi, Port Eynon (51.5767°N 4.2298°W), level terrain fort
- Llwynheiernin (51.6356°N 3.9176°W), hillslope fort
- Maiden Castle, Oxwich (51.5485°N 4.1515°W), promontory fort
- Old Castle Promontory Fort, Rhossili (51.5684°N 4.2966°W), promontory fort
- Pen-y-gaer, Pen-clawdd (51.6394°N 4.1163°W), partial contour fort
- Redley Cliff Camp (51.5692°N 4.0387°W), promontory fort
- Reynoldston Camp (51.5876°N 4.1905°W), hillslope fort
- Stembridge Hillfort (51.6011°N 4.2108°W), promontory fort
- The Bulwark, Llanmadoc Hill (51.612°N 4.2499°W), hillslope fort
- Thurba Head (51.5603°N 4.2783°W), promontory fort
- Tor-Gro (51.6197°N 4.2245°W), level terrain fort
- Willoxton Cwm (51.583°N 4.0959°W), hillslope fort
- Worm's Head (51.564°N 4.3193°W), promontory fort
- Yellow Top, Paviland (51.5509°N 4.2555°W), promontory fort

== Conwy County Borough ==
- Braich-y-Ddinas (53.2587°N 3.9488°W), partial contour fort
- Bryn Euryn (53.3021°N 3.7544°W), partial contour fort
- Bryngaer Dinas (53.2456°N 3.9493°W), contour fort
- Caer Bach (53.2389°N 3.8831°W), partial contour fort
- Caer Caradog (53.0186°N 3.5395°W), partial contour fort
- Caer Ddunod (53.0559°N 3.5157°W), partial contour fort
- Castell Caer Seion (53.2826°N 3.8617°W), contour fort
- Cerrig-y-ddinas, Llangelynin (53.2479°N 3.8686°W), partial contour fort
- Dinas Allt Wen, Dwygyfylchi (53.2781°N 3.8829°W), contour fort
- Dinorben (53.2682°N 3.5488°W), contour fort
- Erw Goch Camp (53.2431°N 3.7717°W), level terrain fort
- Mynydd y Gaer (53.2332°N 3.5404°W), contour fort
- Pen y corddyn Mawr (53.2734°N 3.6285°W), partial contour fort
- Pen y Dinas (53.3296°N 3.8348°W), promontory fort
- Pen y Gaer (53.206°N 3.873°W), contour fort
- Pen-y-Castell, Maenan (53.1819°N 3.8076°W), hillslope fort
- Tan-y-Gopa (53.2768°N 3.5971°W), contour fort

== Denbighshire ==
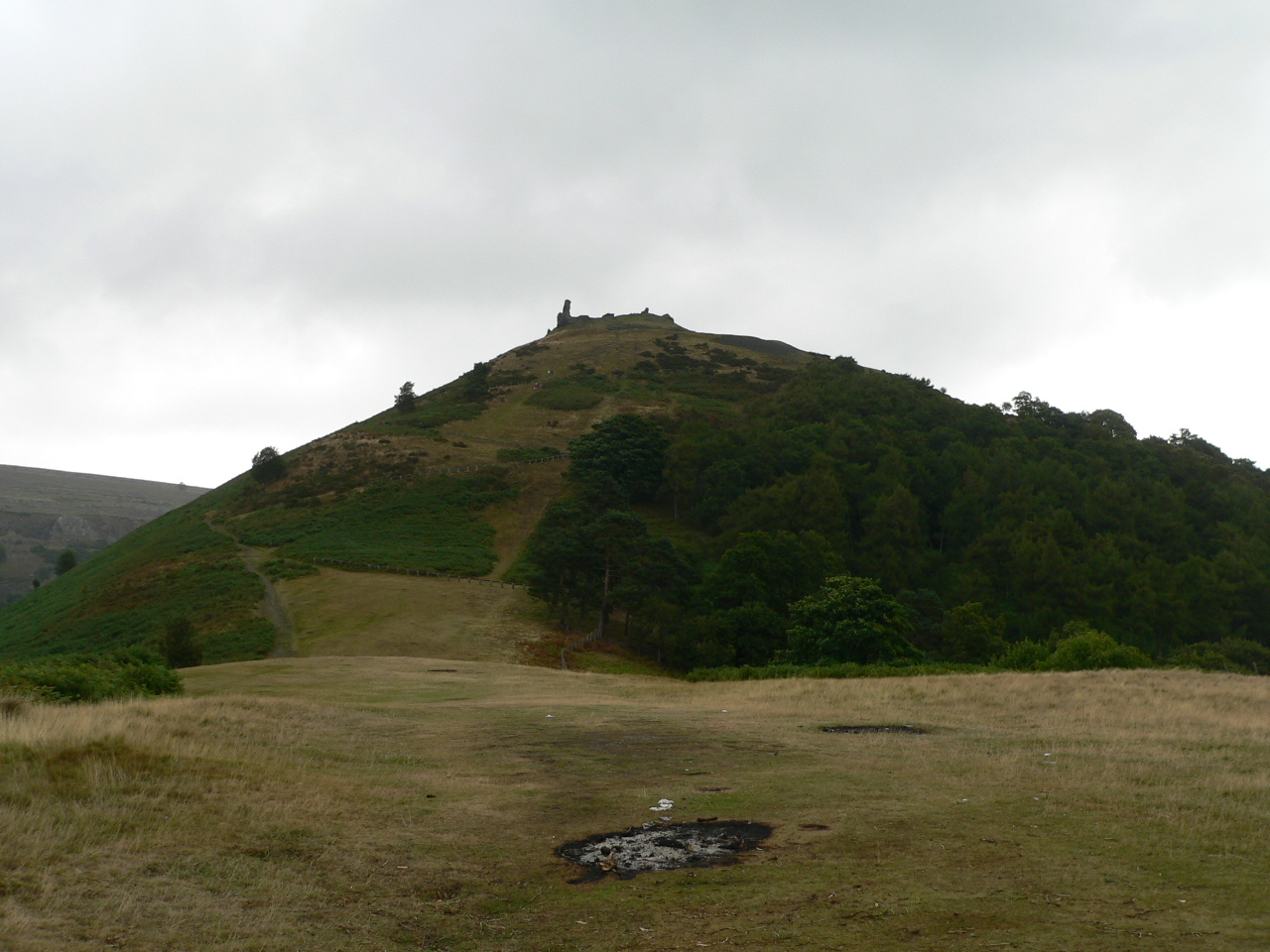
Castell Dinas Bran

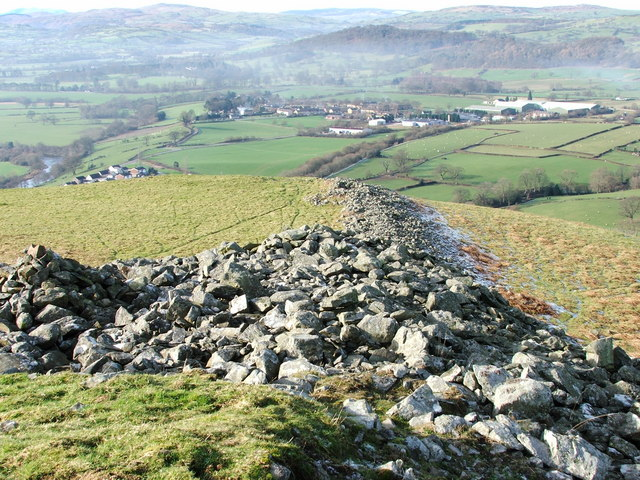
Caer Drewyn

- Bedd-y-Cawr, St Asaph (53.2365°N 3.4798°W), promontory fort
- Caer Drewyn (52.9892°N 3.3601°W), partial contour fort
- Castell Dinas Bran (52.9794°N 3.1587°W), contour fort
- Craig Adwy Wynt (53.0793°N 3.3129°W), partial contour fort
- Craig yr Ychain (52.9179°N 3.4523°W), partial contour fort
- Dinas Melin-y-Wig (53.0312°N 3.4193°W), contour fort
- Foel Fenlli (53.1314°N 3.2523°W), partial contour fort
- Gwernheylod Banks (52.9838°N 2.9416°W), promontory fort
- Moel Fodig (53.0007°N 3.3482°W), contour fort
- Moel Hiraddug (53.2947°N 3.407°W), contour fort
- Moel y Gaer, Bodfari (53.2265°N 3.3568°W), partial contour fort
- Moel y Gaer, Llanbedr (53.146°N 3.2742°W), contour fort
- Moel y Gaer, Llantysilio (53.0081°N 3.2428°W), contour fort
- Mynydd Rhyd ddu (53.0187°N 3.4104°W), contour fort
- Pen y Gaer, Efenechtyd (53.0832°N 3.3364°W), contour fort
- Pen y Gaer, Trefor (52.9764°N 3.1184°W), level terrain fort
- Penycloddiau (53.1987°N 3.3055°W), partial contour fort
- Pwll-y-Clai (53.1172°N 3.3753°W), contour fort
- Tan-y-Llan (53.0806°N 3.3703°W), hillslope fort
- Vivod (52.9755°N 3.2122°W), level terrain fort

== Flintshire ==
- Caer Estyn (53.1101°N 3.0262°W), contour fort
- Glol Camp (53.2929°N 3.3218°W), contour fort
- Moel Arthur (53.1845°N 3.2806°W), contour fort
- Moel Ffagnallt (53.22°N 3.2146°W), contour fort
- Moel y Gaer, Rhosesmor (53.2124°N 3.1826°W), contour fort

== Gwynedd ==
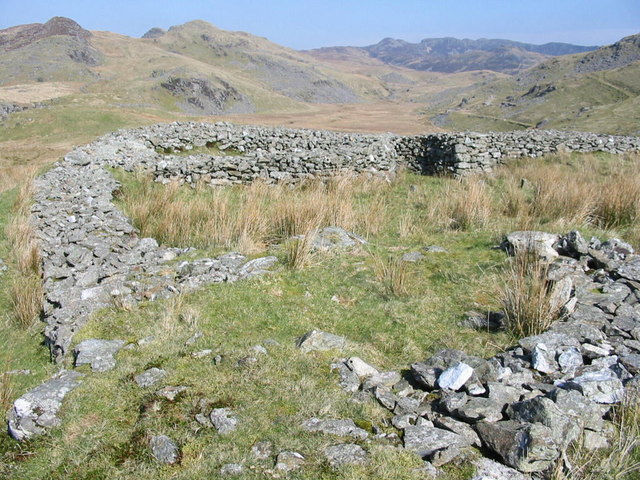
Bryn y Castell

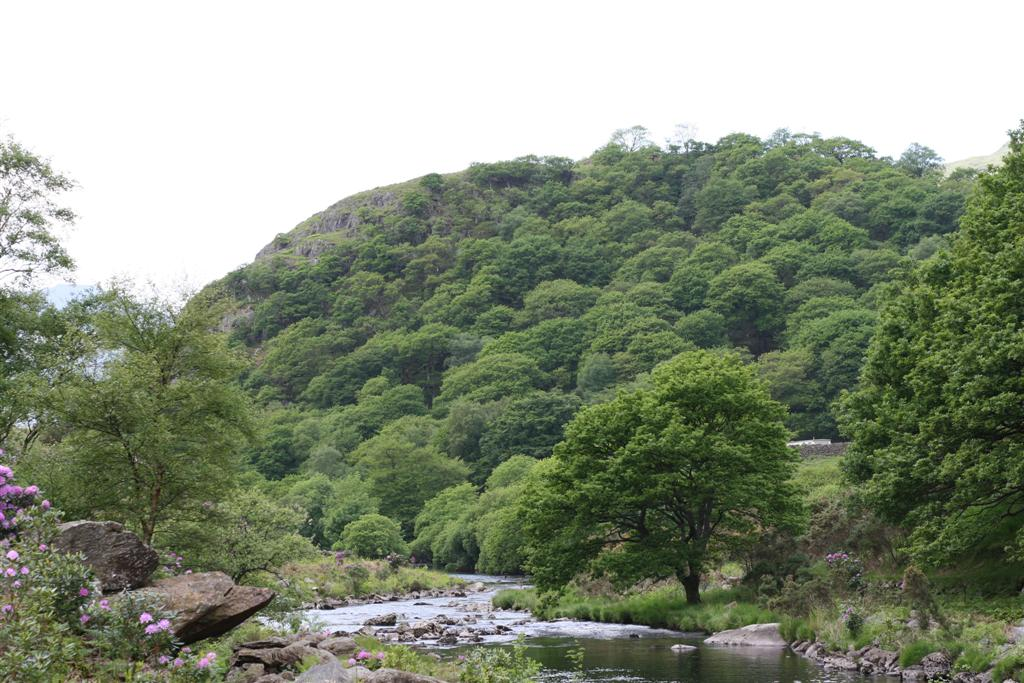
Dinas Emrys

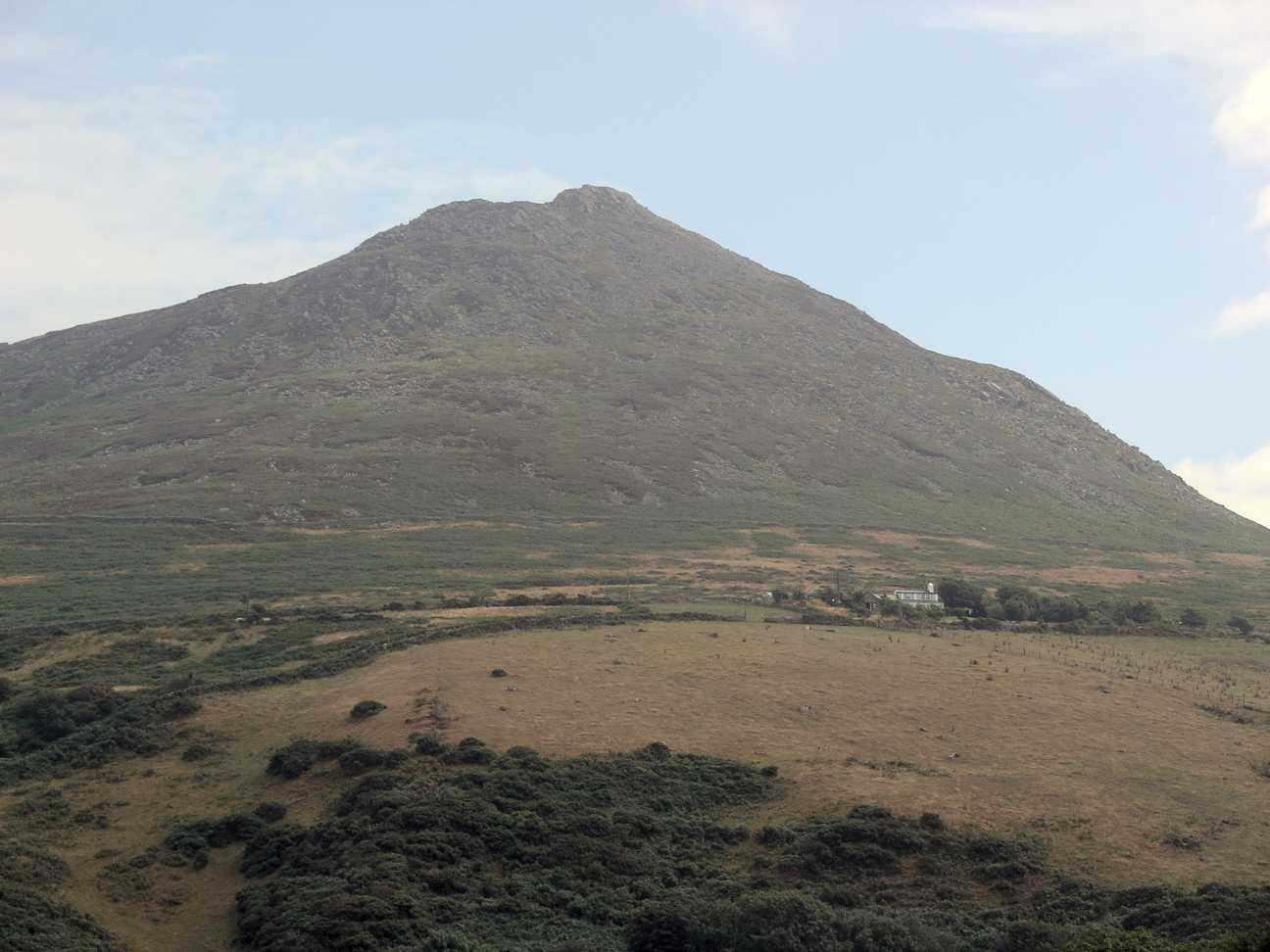
Garn Fadryn

- Bryn Castell, Uwch Mynydd (52.7645°N 4.0011°W), contour fort
- Bryn Rhydd (52.9183°N 4.582°W), partial contour fort
- Bryn-y-Castell (52.9689°N 3.8953°W), contour fort
- Bwlch Ffordd Isa (52.9306°N 4.3788°W), partial contour fort
- Bwlch, Llangelynin (52.6293°N 4.1143°W), partial contour fort
- Byrllysg fort (52.7962°N 4.0839°W), hillslope fort
- Caer Carreg-y-Fran, Cwm Glo (53.1419°N 4.1734°W), contour fort
- Caer Euni (52.9597°N 3.4893°W), partial contour fort
- Caer Pencraig, Ty'n y Caeau (53.1843°N 4.1065°W), contour fort
- Caer, Glascoed (53.1567°N 4.1737°W), contour fort
- Careg-y-Llam, Pistyll (52.9643°N 4.482°W), promontory fort
- Carn Fadryn castle and hillfort (52.88592°N 4.55615°W), contour fort
- Carn Pentyrch, Llangybi (52.9502°N 4.3467°W), contour fort
- Castell Caerau Camp, Gyrn Goch (52.9718°N 4.2218°W), contour fort
- Castell Mawr, Rhoslefain (52.6224°N 4.0986°W), partial contour fort
- Castell Odo, Aberdaron (52.8232°N 4.692°W), contour fort
- Castell Pared Mawr (52.7929°N 4.517°W), level terrain fort
- Castell-y-Gaer, Llangelynin (52.6606°N 4.0832°W), contour fort
- Castell, Llanengan (52.8108°N 4.5313°W), partial contour fort
- Cefn Ddwysarn Camp (52.9312°N 3.5383°W), partial contour fort
- Clogwyn Arllef (52.8372°N 4.0865°W), contour fort
- Conion (52.8232°N 4.6283°W), level terrain fort
- Craig y Castell I, Brithdir (52.724°N 3.9349°W), contour fort
- Craig y Castell II, Brithdir (52.7377°N 3.9383°W), contour fort
- Craig y Ddinas, Llanddwywe-is-y-Gaer (52.787°N 4.0414°W), contour fort
- Craig yr Aderyn (52.6419°N 4.0055°W), contour fort
- Craig-y-Dinas, Pontllyfni (53.0426°N 4.3162°W), contour fort
- Craig-y-Tyddyn Camp (52.9611°N 4.2263°W), partial contour fort
- Creigiau Gwineu (52.8155°N 4.6308°W), contour fort
- Dinas Camp, Y Felinheli (53.1807°N 4.2177°W), promontory fort
- Dinas Dinlle hillfort (53.0816°N 4.3347°W), contour fort
- Dinas Dinorwig (53.1651°N 4.1707°W), contour fort
- Dinas Emrys (53.0219°N 4.0789°W), contour fort
- Dinas Oleu (52.7219°N 4.049°W), contour fort
- Dinas, Beddgelert (53.0183°N 4.1006°W), contour fort
- Dinas, Ty-du (53.1166°N 4.1432°W), contour fort
- Ffridd Fechan Fort (52.7405°N 4.0526°W), hillslope fort
- Foel Caethle, Tywyn (52.568°N 4.0575°W), contour fort
- Garn Boduan (52.9245°N 4.5145°W), contour fort
- Garn Saethon (52.8741°N 4.5304°W), contour fort
- Llechlwyd Tonfanau, Tywyn (52.6074°N 4.1098°W), promontory fort
- Maes-y-Gaer Camp, Aber (53.2328°N 4.0037°W), contour fort
- Maesoglan Farm (52.9116°N 4.534°W), hillslope fort
- Moel Dinas, Garreg (52.9604°N 4.0475°W), contour fort
- Moel Faner (52.7667°N 3.8797°W), contour fort
- Moel Goedog Camp (52.8721°N 4.0612°W), partial contour fort
- Moel Offrwm (52.7719°N 3.8548°W), contour fort
- Moel Offrwm Lower Camp (52.7686°N 3.8573°W), hillfort
- Moel y Gest (52.9278°N 4.16°W), contour fort
- Mynydd Mynyllod (52.9471°N 3.4863°W), partial contour fort
- Mynydd Mynytho (52.8504°N 4.5239°W), partial contour fort
- Nant-y-Castell, Llanbedrog (52.8543°N 4.4941°W), contour fort
- Nantlle, Llanllyfni (53.0589°N 4.201°W), contour fort
- Pared y Cefn hir (52.717°N 3.9784°W), contour fort
- Pen Dinas Camp, Llandygai (53.191°N 4.0819°W), partial contour fort
- Pen y Dinas (52.7673°N 4.0669°W), partial contour fort
- Pen y Gaer, Cilfodan, Bethesda (53.1846°N 4.0544°W), contour fort
- Pen y Gaer, Llanaelhaearn (52.9838°N 4.3419°W), contour fort
- Pen-y-Bryn, Cymer (52.7577°N 3.8869°W), promontory fort
- Pen-y-Gaer Camp, Aberglaslyn (52.9904°N 4.1073°W), contour fort
- Pen-y-Gaer, Afon Soch (52.8247°N 4.5266°W), contour fort
- Pen-y-Gaer, Llanbedrog (52.8545°N 4.4913°W), promontory fort
- Pen-y-Garreg, Clynnog (53.0216°N 4.3469°W), partial contour fort
- Pier Camp, Bangor (53.2337°N 4.1277°W), contour fort
- Polish Home, Rhyd-y-Clafdy (52.8811°N 4.4817°W), contour fort
- Porth Oer (52.8376°N 4.722°W), promontory fort
- Tal-y-Gareg, Tonfanau Quarry, Towyn (52.6113°N 4.1073°W), contour fort
- Tre'r Ceiri (52.9747°N 4.4238°W), contour fort
- Trwyn Porth Dinllaen (52.944°N 4.5687°W), promontory fort
- Tyddyn Bychan, Rhyd y Clafdy (52.8829°N 4.4967°W), promontory fort
- Wyddgrug (52.9003°N 4.5497°W), contour fort
- Y Foel, Pontllynfi (53.0309°N 4.3123°W), contour fort
- Y Gaer, Ystum Gwadnaeth (52.7807°N 3.8193°W), contour fort
- Ynys For (52.9638°N 4.0869°W), partial contour fort

== Merthyr Tydfil County Borough ==
- Castell Morlais (51.7768°N 3.3789°W), contour fort

== Monmouthshire ==
- Blackfield Wood Camp (51.6878°N 2.6827°W), promontory fort
- Cae Camp (51.6398°N 2.9278°W), contour fort
- Caerau Camp, Ponthir (51.6357°N 2.9698°W), partial contour fort
- Coed y Bwnydd Camp (51.7563°N 2.9214°W), contour fort
- Gaer Fawr Camp, Llangwm (51.6853°N 2.8096°W), contour fort
- Gaer Hill Camp, Penterry (51.6779°N 2.7002°W), contour fort
- Gaer hill fort, Trellech (51.7303°N 2.7356°W), multiple enclosure hillfort
- Great House Camp (51.7261°N 2.8231°W), contour fort
- Llancayo Camp (51.7294°N 2.902°W), promontory fort
- Llanmelin Wood Camp and Llanmelin Outpost, Caerwent (51.6291°N 2.7794°W), contour fort
- Mitchel-troy enclosure (51.7924°N 2.7399°W), hillslope fort
- Pen Twyn, Llanfihangel Crucorney (51.9011°N 2.9874°W), contour fort
- Piercefield Great Camp (51.6604°N 2.6721°W), partial contour fort
- Piercefield Little Camp (51.6583°N 2.6772°W), level terrain fort
- Sudbrook Camp (51.5826°N 2.7154°W), promontory fort
- The Bulwarks, Chepstow (51.6312°N 2.6689°W), promontory fort
- The Larches Camp (51.6058°N 2.8202°W), contour fort
- Twyn y Gaer, Llanfihangel Crucorney (51.8916°N 3.0273°W), contour fort
- Ysgyryd (Skirrid) Fawr (51.859°N 2.9727°W), contour fort

== Neath Port Talbot County Borough ==
- Buarth y Gaer (51.6276°N 3.7849°W), contour fort
- Caer Blaen-y-cwm, Margam (51.579°N 3.6851°W), hillslope fort
- Carn Caca (51.6918°N 3.6914°W), partial contour fort
- Cefn yr Argoed (51.6331°N 3.6888°W), hillslope fort
- Craig Ty-Isaf (51.6254°N 3.7979°W), partial contour fort
- Gaer Fawr Lower Camp, Mynydd y Gaer (51.6331°N 3.785°W), partial contour fort
- Glyn-Neath (51.7492°N 3.6166°W), contour fort
- Half Moon Camp, Margam (51.5666°N 3.7332°W), contour fort
- Mynydd-y-Castell Camp, Margam (51.5653°N 3.7237°W), contour fort
- Pen y Castell, Cwmafan (51.6115°N 3.7509°W), contour fort
- Warren Hill, Briton Ferry (51.6315°N 3.8269°W), contour fort

== Newport ==
- Castell Prin (51.6272°N 2.854°W), contour fort
- Coed-y-Caerau enclosure complex (51.619°N 2.8995°W), contour fort
- Graig-y-Saeson (51.5701°N 3.0499°W), partial contour fort
- Lodge Wood Camp (51.6164°N 2.9792°W), contour fort
- Rhiwderin Camp (51.5836°N 3.0636°W), contour fort
- St Julian's Wood Camp, Christchurch (51.5969°N 2.9541°W), hillslope fort
- The Mount, Pen-y-Lan (51.5579°N 3.071°W), contour fort
- Tredegar Fort (51.5759°N 3.0267°W), contour fort
- Wilcrick Hill Camp (51.5859°N 2.8512°W), contour fort

== Pembrokeshire ==
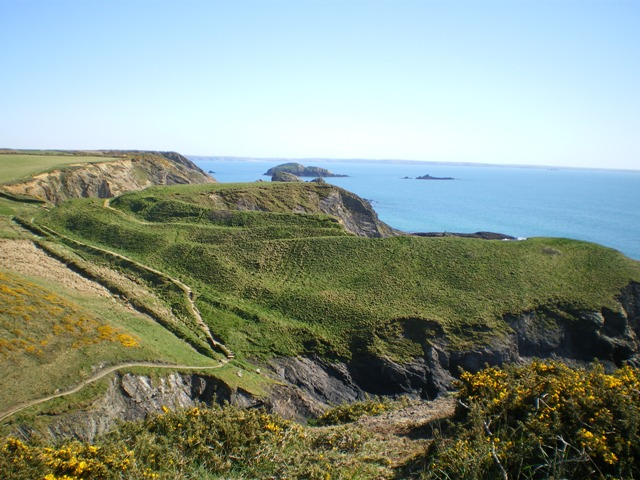
Porth y Rhaw

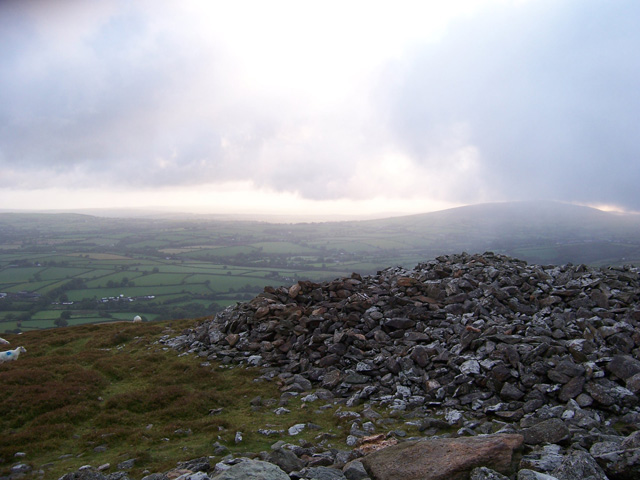
Foel Drygarn

- Allt Fawr (51.8994°N 4.7931°W), promontory fort
- Arnold's Hill (51.8027°N 4.885°W), partial contour fort
- Berry Hill (52.0204°N 4.816°W), promontory fort
- Berry Slade (51.6301°N 5.0602°W), promontory fort
- Black Point Rath (51.7952°N 5.105°W), promontory fort
- Blaen Gywddno (51.7793°N 4.6807°W), promontory fort
- Borough Head (51.771°N 5.1354°W), promontory fort
- Bowett Wood Camp (51.6681°N 4.935°W), promontory fort
- Brawdy Castle (51.8732°N 5.1061°W), promontory fort
- Broadmoor Rath (51.7682°N 5.1653°W), promontory fort
- Buckspool Down Camp (51.6023°N 4.9553°W), promontory fort
- Bulliber Camp (51.6293°N 5.0316°W), partial contour fort
- Bush Inn Camp, Robeston Wathen (51.8053°N 4.7916°W), promontory fort
- Caer Aber Pwll, Caerau (51.9311°N 5.2184°W), promontory fort
- Caerau Gaer, Llandewi Velfrey (51.8125°N 4.6999°W), partial contour fort
- Canaston Wood Camp (51.7927°N 4.7729°W), promontory fort
- Capeston Rath (51.7435°N 5.0901°W), promontory fort
- Carn Alw (51.9707°N 4.7112°W), partial contour fort
- Carn Ffoi (52.0055°N 4.8447°W), contour fort
- Carningli Hillfort (52°N 4.8227°W), partial contour fort
- Carreg Golchfa (51.9747°N 5.084°W), promontory fort
- Castell Caerwen (51.9705°N 4.8877°W), promontory fort
- Castell Coch, Penmorfa (51.9702°N 5.0989°W), promontory fort
- Castell Coch, Tremynydd (51.9272°N 5.2368°W), promontory fort
- Castell Coch, Trevine (51.9607°N 5.145°W), promontory fort
- Castell Cynon (51.975°N 4.8365°W), promontory fort
- Castell Felinganol (52.0482°N 4.679°W), promontory fort
- Castell Forlan (51.905°N 4.775°W), promontory fort
- Castell Gilfach Gam (51.9715°N 4.4888°W), promontory fort
- Castell Gwyn II (51.8613°N 4.7515°W), promontory fort
- Castell Gwyn, Llandissilio (51.8621°N 4.746°W), multiple enclosure hillfort
- Castell Gwyndy (51.823°N 4.6755°W), promontory fort
- Castell Heinif (51.8742°N 5.3082°W), promontory fort
- Castell Hendre Wen (51.9628°N 5.0278°W), partial contour fort
- Castell Henllys (52.0178°N 4.7453°W), partial contour fort
- Castell Llwyd, Meline (52.0049°N 4.751°W), promontory fort
- Castell Mael, Puncheston (51.9306°N 4.8963°W), promontory fort
- Castell Mawr Hillfort (52.0064°N 4.7424°W), contour fort
- Castell Meherin East (51.7738°N 4.6867°W), contour fort
- Castell Meherin West (51.774°N 4.6883°W), partial contour fort
- Castell Nanhyfer, Nevern (52.0267°N 4.7969°W), promontory fort
- Castell Pant-y-Phillip (51.9625°N 4.9806°W), contour fort
- Castell Pen-yr-Allt, Llantood (52.0461°N 4.6877°W), promontory fort
- Castell Pengegin (51.9734°N 4.8564°W), promontory fort
- Castell Penpleidiau (51.8696°N 5.251°W), promontory fort
- Castell Rhyd-y-Brwyn (51.866°N 4.8093°W), partial contour fort
- Castell Tre Ruffydd (52.0697°N 4.7727°W), promontory fort
- Castell Trefach, Nevern (52.0325°N 4.7905°W), promontory fort
- Castell-y-Fuwch (51.9255°N 4.8744°W), hillslope fort
- Castle Head, St. Brides (51.7559°N 5.1923°W), promontory fort
- Castle Lake Camp (51.78°N 4.8694°W), promontory fort
- Castlemartin Castle (51.6457°N 5.0147°W), contour fort
- Castles Bay (51.6735°N 5.1179°W), promontory fort
- Clawdd y Milwyr (51.903°N 5.312°W), promontory fort
- Clegyr Boia (51.8785°N 5.2885°W), contour fort
- Crocksydam Camp (51.61°N 4.9825°W), promontory fort
- Crowhill Rath (51.8172°N 4.9752°W), promontory fort
- Cwm Gloyn Camp (Eastern enclosure). (52.023°N 4.765°W), promontory fort
- Cwm Gloyn II (West enclosure) (52.023°N 4.7664°W), promontory fort
- Cwm-Pen-y-Benglog (52.0021°N 4.7421°W), promontory fort
- Dale Point (51.7032°N 5.1546°W), promontory fort
- Denant (51.7775°N 5.0132°W), promontory fort
- Dinas Fach, Solva (51.8621°N 5.1592°W), promontory fort
- Dinas Island Castle (East) (52.0245°N 4.8969°W), partial contour fort
- Dinas Mawr, Llanwnda, Pen-caer (52.0064°N 5.0782°W), promontory fort
- Faenor Gaer (51.82°N 4.7665°W), partial contour fort
- Ffynone Wood (52.0165°N 4.5591°W), promontory fort
- Fishpond Camp (51.6157°N 4.9315°W), promontory fort
- Flimston Bay Camp, Castlemartin (51.6126°N 4.991°W), promontory fort
- Foel Drygarn (51.9703°N 4.6833°W), contour fort
- Freshwater East Camp (51.6485°N 4.8586°W), promontory fort
- Gaer Cwmffryd (52.0367°N 4.6837°W), promontory fort
- Garn Fawr (52.008°N 5.0676°W), contour fort
- Garn Fechan, Llanwnda (52.009°N 5.0605°W), contour fort
- Glandwr Isaf Camp (52.0692°N 4.7361°W), promontory fort
- Great Castle Head, Dale (51.7066°N 5.1865°W), promontory fort
- Great Castle Head, St Ishmael's (51.7116°N 5.116°W), promontory fort
- Great Treffgarne Rocks Camp (51.8867°N 4.9705°W), contour fort
- Greenala Camp (51.6325°N 4.8818°W), promontory fort
- Gribin Promontory Fort, Solva (51.8703°N 5.194°W), contour fort
- Gribin Ridge Fort, Solva (51.8731°N 5.1881°W), partial contour fort
- Hazel Grove Camp South (51.8726°N 4.9582°W), promontory fort
- Holgan (51.829°N 4.7972°W), promontory fort
- Howney Stone Rath (51.7711°N 5.1609°W), promontory fort
- Keeston Castle (51.8353°N 5.0519°W), partial contour fort
- Lambeeth (51.6735°N 4.9849°W), promontory fort
- Lamborough Camp (51.8421°N 4.8639°W), promontory fort
- Linney Head Camp, Castlemartin (51.6204°N 5.0517°W), promontory fort
- Little Aber Pwll, Caerau (51.932°N 5.2162°W), promontory fort
- Little Castle Head, St Ishmael's (51.7161°N 5.1071°W), promontory fort
- Little Castle Point, Dale (51.6905°N 5.1872°W), promontory fort
- Llanddewi Gaer (51.8124°N 4.6932°W), promontory fort
- Marloes Sound Rath (51.7259°N 5.2319°W), level terrain fort
- Martin's Haven (51.6882°N 5.009°W), promontory fort
- Merrion Camp (51.6391°N 4.9783°W), partial contour fort
- Molleston Back Camp (51.7826°N 4.7741°W), hillslope fort
- Mullock Bridge West (51.7303°N 5.1787°W), promontory fort
- Old Castle Camp, Manorbier (51.6359°N 4.7821°W), promontory fort
- Old Castle, Milford (51.7095°N 5.0236°W), promontory fort
- Pant-y-Cadno (51.8703°N 4.7428°W), contour fort
- Parc Castell, Castlebythe (51.9349°N 4.8844°W), promontory fort
- Parc Castell, Pont Cwm-bach (51.9903°N 4.9991°W), promontory fort
- Pen-Castell, St Dogmael's (52.0795°N 4.7589°W), promontory fort
- Penrhyn Erw-goch (52.01145°N 4.9279°W), promontory fort
- Poll Carn (51.8814°N 4.9766°W), partial contour fort
- Porth Y Bwch (51.8658°N 5.1792°W), promontory fort
- Porth y Rhaw Camp (51.8723°N 5.2176°W), promontory fort
- Porth-Egr (51.9453°N 5.2011°W), promontory fort
- Posty Draw, Bletherston (51.8744°N 4.7989°W), promontory fort
- Quoit's Wood (51.6696°N 4.9378°W), promontory fort
- Romans Castle (51.7543°N 5.051°W), partial contour fort
- Rudbaxton Rath (51.8319°N 4.9254°W), contour fort
- Skomar Camp, Lydstep (51.6443°N 4.7691°W), promontory fort
- Solva (51.8745°N 5.185°W), partial contour fort
- South Castle, Skomer (51.7331°N 5.2801°W), promontory fort
- South Hook Camp (51.7146°N 5.0903°W), promontory fort
- St Lawrence Camp (51.9096°N 5.0077°W), promontory fort
- Stackpole (51.6245°N 4.9002°W), promontory fort
- Stackpole, Cheriton (51.6326°N 4.9104°W), contour fort
- Sunnyside (51.8072°N 4.7861°W), contour fort
- Syke Rath (51.7506°N 5.0839°W), promontory fort
- Thornton Rath (51.7305°N 5.0351°W), promontory fort
- Tower Point, St. Brides (51.7523°N 5.203°W), promontory fort
- Trwyn-y-Castell (51.9382°N 5.2107°W), promontory fort
- Tyganol Fort, Nevern (51.9964°N 4.7822°W), promontory fort
- Walwyn's Castle (51.7579°N 5.0838°W), promontory fort
- Warman's Hill (51.6285°N 5.0256°W), hillslope fort
- West Angle Bay (51.6895°N 5.1108°W), promontory fort
- West Pennar Rath (51.6879°N 4.9908°W), partial contour fort
- West Pickard Camp (51.6673°N 5.0923°W), promontory fort
- West Popton Camp (51.69381°N 5.0298°W), promontory fort
- Wooltack Point (51.7355°N 5.2484°W), promontory fort
- Y Castell, Bridell (52.0293°N 4.67°W), promontory fort
- Y Gaer, Bridell (52.0509°N 4.6674°W), promontory fort
- Y-Castell, Henre Ruffydd, Solva (51.8843°N 5.1925°W), promontory fort
- Ynys-y-Castell, Abercastle (51.9621°N 5.129°W), promontory fort

== Powys ==
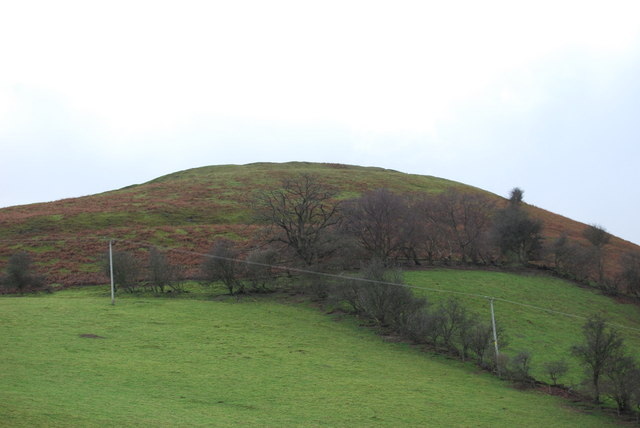
Llwyn Bryn Dinas

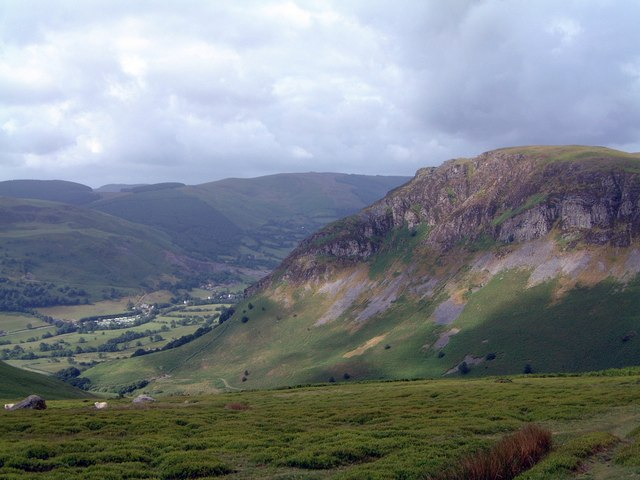
Craig Rhiwarth

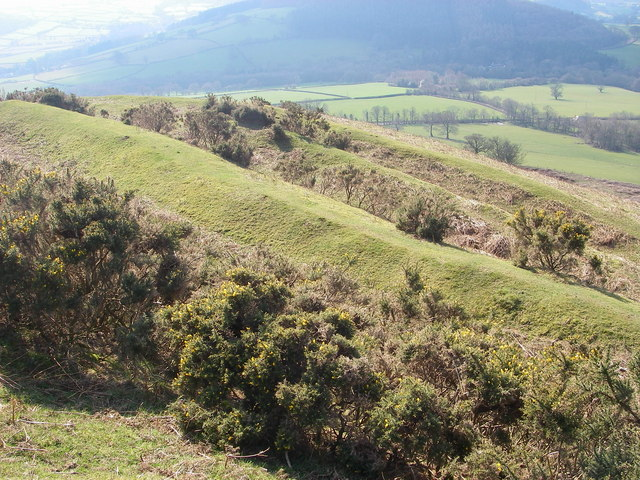
Pen-y-crug

- Aberllynfi Gaer (52.0308°N 3.2038°W), partial contour fort
- Afon Tarell (51.911°N 3.4654°W), promontory fort
- Allt yr Esgair (51.9108°N 3.2718°W), contour fort
- Bausley Hill (52.7243°N 3.0054°W), partial contour fort
- Beacon Ring (52.6449°N 3.0878°W), contour fort
- Black Bank (52.6611°N 3.0901°W), partial contour fort
- Breidden hillfort (52.7227°N 3.0442°W), contour fort
- Bryn Mawr (52.764°N 3.1113°W), contour fort
- Bryn-y-Saethau (52.6883°N 3.2998°W), contour fort
- Bryngwyn Wood Camp (52.7518°N 3.2109°W), contour fort
- Burfa Castle (52.2429°N 3.0499°W), contour fort
- Bwlch-y-Cibau (52.7477°N 3.2215°W), contour fort
- Caer Din (52.5009°N 3.072°W), contour fort
- Caer Einon (52.1677°N 3.3703°W), promontory fort
- Caer Fawr, Llanelwedd (52.1675°N 3.379°W), promontory fort
- Careg-wiber Bank (52.2261°N 3.3425°W), level terrain fort
- Castell Carno (52.5526°N 3.5515°W), partial contour fort
- Castell Dinas, Talgarth (51.9631°N 3.1965°W), contour fort
- Castell-y-Blaidd (52.4092°N 3.2881°W), contour fort
- Castell-y-Dail (52.4978°N 3.3356°W), partial contour fort
- Castle Bank, Glascwm (52.1954°N 3.3373°W), contour fort
- Castle Ring, Old Churchstoke (52.5468°N 3.0499°W), hillslope fort
- Castle Ring, Pen Offa (52.2657°N 3.0762°W), partial contour fort
- Cefn Carnedd (52.499°N 3.4492°W), contour fort
- Cefn Cyfronydd (52.6664°N 3.268°W), contour fort
- Cefn Llan (52.545°N 3.1726°W), contour fort
- Cefn-Du Camp (52.6757°N 3.258°W), partial contour fort
- Cefn-y-Castell (52.7134°N 3.0294°W), contour fort
- Cefn-y-Coed (52.5323°N 3.1758°W), hillslope fort
- Cefn-yr-Allt (52.6092°N 3.1925°W), partial contour fort
- Cefnllys Castle (52.2438°N 3.3354°W), contour fort
- Clawdd Wood (52.6889°N 3.2434°W), contour fort
- Coed Fennifach (51.9547°N 3.4363°W), contour fort
- Coed Mawr Gaer (52.4792°N 3.4507°W), contour fort
- Coed Pentwyn (51.8388°N 3.1717°W), partial contour fort
- Coed Swydd (52.2734°N 3.2665°W), hillslope fort
- Coed y Caerau (51.9066°N 3.3543°W), hillslope fort
- Coed-y-Gaer, Llanfihangel Cwmdu (51.9088°N 3.199°W), partial contour fort
- Corn y Fan (52.0079°N 3.4801°W), contour fort
- Craig Rhiwarth (52.8321°N 3.4052°W), contour fort
- Craig y Ddinas (51.76065°N 3.5735°W), promontory fort
- Cross Oak (51.9034°N 3.2943°W), contour fort
- Crowther's Camp (52.6939°N 3.1147°W), partial contour fort
- Crug Hywel (51.8792°N 3.1264°W), partial contour fort
- Cwm Aran (52.3223°N 3.2542°W), contour fort
- Cwm Berwyn (52.1841°N 3.3578°W), promontory fort
- Cwm Cefn-y-Gaer (52.3206°N 3.2905°W), partial contour fort
- Cwm Golog, Kerry (52.4847°N 3.2157°W), hillslope fort
- Dinas, Trefeglwys (52.4878°N 3.6135°W), partial contour fort
- Dol-y-Gaer (51.8237°N 3.3662°W), promontory fort
- Drostre Bank (51.9731°N 3.3095°W), partial contour fort
- Ffinant Isaf, Aberysgir (51.9767°N 3.4836°W), hillslope fort
- Ffridd Faldwyn, Montgomery (52.5647°N 3.1568°W), contour fort
- Ffridd Mathrafal (52.6934°N 3.305°W), contour fort
- Fron Goch (52.5973°N 3.7403°W), contour fort
- Fron Goth II (52.3431°N 3.1531°W), contour fort
- Fron Haul (52.5882°N 3.3917°W), promontory fort
- Fronderw Wood Camp (52.4919°N 3.2215°W), hillslope fort
- Gaer Fach, Merthyr Cynog (52.0193°N 3.4452°W), contour fort
- Gaer Fawr, Alltarnog (52.0319°N 3.429°W), contour fort
- Gaer Fawr, Guilsfield (52.7093°N 3.15°W), contour fort
- Gaer, Glascwm (52.1841°N 3.3392°W), contour fort
- Gallt-y-Gog (52.5946°N 3.844°W), contour fort
- Gardden Camp (52.6666°N 3.4305°W), contour fort
- Garth Hill enclosure, Nantmel (52.1446°N 3.3856°W), contour fort
- Garth, Nantmel (52.2951°N 3.4127°W), partial contour fort
- Gelli-nedd (51.8139°N 3.5718°W), partial contour fort
- Giant's Bank (52.522°N 3.2513°W), contour fort
- Glan Frogan (52.754°N 3.2069°W), contour fort
- Glog Hill Camp (52.3132°N 3.1272°W), partial contour fort
- Gogerddan Camp (52.6967°N 3.4913°W), contour fort
- Graig Fawr Camp, Hundred House (52.2171°N 3.2729°W), contour fort
- Great Cloddiau (52.5097°N 3.2409°W), partial contour fort
- Gwern Ddu Wood (52.6875°N 3.2723°W), hillslope fort
- Hillis Camp (51.9859°N 3.2916°W), contour fort
- Knucklas Castle (52.3635°N 3.1028°W), contour fort
- Lawn Farm (52.3837°N 3.17°W), partial contour fort
- Llandegley Rocks (East enclosure) (52.2483°N 3.2686°W), contour fort
- Llandegley Rocks (West enclosure) (52.2465°N 3.2738°W), contour fort
- Llanerch Farm enclosure (52.2201°N 3.2352°W), contour fort
- Llangenny Camp (51.8606°N 3.1222°W), contour fort
- Llanymynech Hill (52.7918°N 3.0917°W), contour fort
- Llethrau Camp (52.441°N 3.2641°W), hillslope fort
- Llwyn Bryn Dinas (52.8135°N 3.2294°W), hillfort
- Llwyn Celyn (52.0888°N 3.172°W), partial contour fort
- Llwyn Llwyd (52.03764°N 3.4599°W), hillslope fort
- Llys-y-Cawr (Giant's Hall) (52.7096°N 3.3865°W), partial contour fort
- Llysin Hill (52.3074°N 3.2221°W), contour fort
- Lower House Camp (52.623°N 3.2276°W), hillslope fort
- Lower Ucheldre Camp (52.5785°N 3.2695°W), contour fort
- Moel Bentyrch (52.6749°N 3.3986°W), contour fort
- Moel Dolwen Camp (52.6589°N 3.4962°W), contour fort
- Mynydd Llangorse (51.9419°N 3.2229°W), promontory fort
- Nant Tarthwynni East (51.8639°N 3.3256°W), hillslope fort
- Nant Tarthwynni West (51.8661°N 3.3236°W), hillslope fort
- New Pieces (52.7191°N 3.0413°W), partial contour fort
- Pant Mawr (52.6959°N 3.2281°W), contour fort
- Pant-y-ffridd (52.617°N 3.2455°W), promontory fort
- Pen Ffawyddog Gaer (51.8587°N 3.1692°W), hillslope fort
- Pen Rhiw Wen (52.0327°N 3.2732°W), partial contour fort
- Pen y Gaer, Dwyriw (52.591°N 3.3798°W), contour fort
- Pen y Gaer, Llanidloes (52.469°N 3.6084°W), partial contour fort
- Pen-Llys (52.7255°N 3.3263°W), partial contour fort
- Pen-y-Castell II (52.4805°N 3.5537°W), partial contour fort
- Pen-y-Castell, Kerry (52.479°N 3.2765°W), contour fort
- Pen-y-Clun (52.4746°N 3.5828°W), contour fort
- Pen-y-Coed (52.6538°N 3.274°W), hillslope fort
- Pen-y-crug (51.9632°N 3.4142°W), contour fort
- Pen-y-Foel (52.6448°N 3.2155°W), contour fort
- Pen-y-Gaer, Bettws-Cedewain (52.5697°N 3.2707°W), contour fort
- Pen-yr-allt (51.9854°N 3.2963°W), level terrain fort
- Pen'r-Allt, Llanidloes (52.4603°N 3.547°W), contour fort
- Pendre, Talgarth (51.9858°N 3.2306°W), promontory fort
- Penmyarth Camp (51.8787°N 3.2042°W), contour fort
- Pentre Camp, Llangyniew (52.6766°N 3.3068°W), contour fort
- Pentre Wood (52.5162°N 3.0604°W), contour fort
- Perwlwyn Coppice (52.7728°N 3.2607°W), partial contour fort
- Plas-y-Gaer (51.9119°N 3.4074°W), hillslope fort
- Pwll-y-Rhyd (51.8106°N 3.5764°W), hillslope fort
- Rhyd Uchaf II (51.8493°N 3.4714°W), promontory fort
- Roundton Hill (52.5481°N 3.0427°W), contour fort
- Sibwll Wood Camp (52.4976°N 3.2091°W), hillslope fort
- Slwch Tump (51.94619°N 3.3745°W), contour fort
- Soldier's Mount, Foel (52.7773°N 3.1662°W), contour fort
- Soldiers Ring, Broniarth Hill (52.6974°N 3.2426°W), contour fort
- Tan-y-Clawdd Camp (52.6626°N 3.2002°W), contour fort
- The Whimble (52.2562°N 3.166°W), contour fort
- Tinboeth Castle (52.3694°N 3.3371°W), contour fort
- Tre Durn Wood (52.0037°N 3.3027°W), partial contour fort
- Trefnanney Gaer (52.7315°N 3.1809°W), partial contour fort
- Twyn Llechfaen (51.9529°N 3.3369°W), contour fort
- Twyn-y-Gaer (51.9248°N 3.5682°W), contour fort
- Twyn-y-Gaer, Garthbrengy (52.0077°N 3.3788°W), contour fort
- Twyn-y-Gaer, Trallwng (51.9644°N 3.5011°W), partial contour fort
- Ty'n y Cwm Camp (52.4426°N 3.247°W), partial contour fort
- Tyle Clydach (51.8871°N 3.3129°W), hillslope fort
- Welfield Camp (52.165°N 3.411612°W), contour fort
- Wern Camp (52.1745°N 3.2259°W), contour fort
- Wyle Cop Camp, Caersws (52.54°N 3.4413°W), hillslope fort
- Y Gaer, Cefn Cloddiau (52.4996°N 3.5942°W), partial contour fort
- Y Gaer, Llandewi Ystradenni (52.3193°N 3.3004°W), multiple enclosure hillfort
- Y Gaer, Pen-pont (51.9417°N 3.4707°W), contour fort
- Y Golfa Camp (52.6534°N 3.2163°W), promontory fort
- Yr Allt, Llangedwyn (52.8086°N 3.1906°W), hillslope fort
- Ystrad Faelog Hillort (52.525°N 3.4916°W), promontory fort

== Rhondda Cynon Taf ==
- Caerau, Llantrisant (51.5397°N 3.3501°W), contour fort
- Craig-y-Dinas, Hirwaun (51.761°N 3.5735°W), promontory fort
- Gwersyll (51.7266°N 3.4102°W), contour fort
- Lle'r Gaer (51.5741°N 3.3721°W), contour fort
- Maendy Camp (51.6486°N 3.5086°W), contour fort

== Vale of Glamorgan ==
- Bonvilston Gaer (51.4638°N 3.3496°W), partial contour fort
- Caer Dynnaf (51.4581°N 3.4641°W), contour fort
- Castell Moel, Bonvilston (51.4521°N 3.3624°W), partial contour fort
- Castle Ditches, Llancarfan (51.4214°N 3.3546°W), partial contour fort
- Craig Tan-y-Lan (51.5052°N 3.502°W), promontory fort
- Cwm Bach, Wick (51.4314°N 3.586°W), promontory fort
- Dinas Powys hillfort (51.4375°N 3.2206°W), promontory fort
- Llanfythin Camp (51.4385°N 3.3613°W), promontory fort
- Llangian Wood Hillfort (51.4607°N 3.4096°W), hillslope fort
- Llantrithyd Camp (51.4494°N 3.3849°W), hillslope fort
- Mynydd Ruthin (51.5058°N 3.4842°W), hillslope fort
- Mynydd-y-Fforest (51.4953°N 3.4312°W), hillslope fort
- Nash Point Camp (51.4049°N 3.5609°W), promontory fort
- St Mary Hill Down (51.5009°N 3.4893°W), hillslope fort
- Sully Island (51.3957°N 3.1965°W), promontory fort
- The Bulwarks, Porthkerry (51.3887°N 3.3208°W), promontory fort
- Westwood Corner (51.3938°N 3.3066°W), promontory fort

== Wrexham County Borough ==
- Bryn Alun Camp (53.0761°N 2.9993°W), promontory fort
- Bryn-y-Gaer, Broughton (53.0722°N 3.0382°W), contour fort
- Cerrig Gwynion (52.8971°N 3.2622°W), partial contour fort
- Roft Promontory Fort (also known as The Rofft) (53.096°N 2.9599°W), promontory fort
- Y Gardden, Ruabon (52.9958°N 3.0488°W), contour fort

== See also ==
- List of hill forts in England
- List of hill forts in Scotland
- Scheduled Monuments in Wales
