= Caer y Twr =

Hillfort in Anglesey, Wales

Coordinates: 53°18′47.98″N 4°40′32.31″W

Caer y Twr (meaning 'fort of the pile/heap') is an Iron Age hillfort atop the summit of the Holyhead Mountain in Anglesey, Wales.

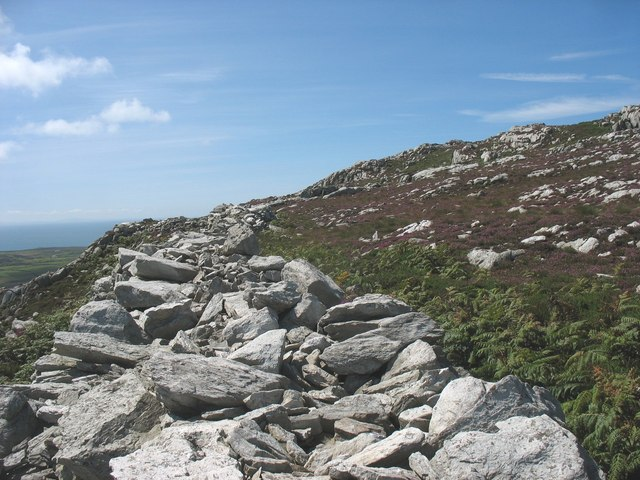
A view along the top of a section of the Caer y Twr hillfort.

The hillfort, which is situated among rocky outcrops, is ideally placed for defence and likely served as a watchtower and possibly as a signal tower. Some have speculated that it was built to alert a small fort in the modern town of Holyhead in the case of raiders coming in from the Irish Sea, while others have suggested that it may have been a lighthouse.

The hillfort is now mostly rubble, but its walls can still be made out, including a large stone rampart on the north and east sides which reaches 3 metres at points. The entrance to the fort was through a rocky gully. The footings of a tower were discovered when the site was excavated; its stones are believed to date from the 2nd to the 4th centuries.

Nestled below Caer y Twr is a group of several enclosed huts, named Cytiau Tŷ Mawr (the Holyhead Mountain Hut Circles), that also date from the 3rd to the 4th centuries, some of which still contain the accoutrements of life, such as hearths and shelves.

== See also ==
- List of hillforts in Wales
