= Slwch Tump =

Hillfort in Powys, Wales

- Pen Cevn-y-Gaer
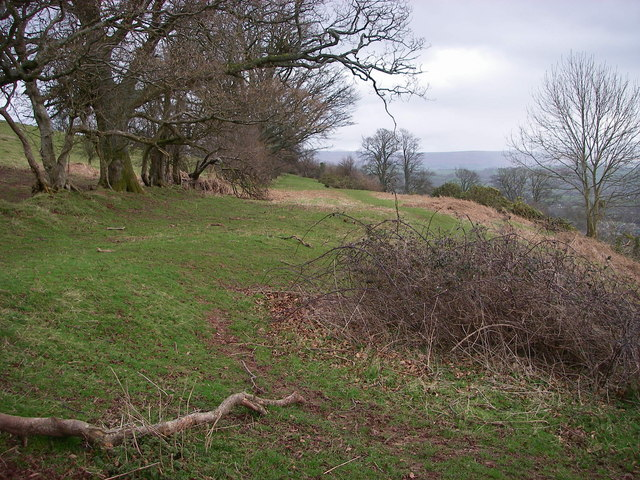
- This level bench in the hillside is the southern edge of Slwch Tump hillfort

- Slwch Tump in Powys, Wales
- 51.946059°N 3.37483°W
- Type: defended enclosure
- Periods: Iron Age

Site notes
- Length: 187 m (614 ft)
- Width: 242 m (794 ft)
- Public access: accessible by public right of way

Slwch Tump, also known as Slwch Camp and formerly known as Pen Cevn-y-Gaer, is an Iron Age hillfort close to Brecon in Powys, Wales.

== Site ==
The enclosure is located on a hill composed of sandstones of the St Maughans Formation with an elevation of 807 ft (246 m), about 0.8 miles (1.3 km) east of the confluence of the Rivers Usk and Honddu in the centre of Brecon. The hillfort can be accessed by a public footpath which joins Slwch Lane north of the site and loops around the rampart.

== Description ==
The hillfort is smaller than the one on nearby Pen-y-crug and is irregular but roughly rectangular in shape, measuring about 187 m by 242 m, with a single encircling rampart. Samuel Lewis described it in 1845 as "defended by a double fosse, which is in some places nearly destroyed". Its entrance is on the north-west side, towards Brecon.

Today its form is somewhat obscured by hedges and trees. Within the hillfort area there are remains of abandoned quarries for building stone.

== St Eluned ==
A small church stood for some time at Slwch Tump, marking the place where Saint Eluned was supposedly beheaded. Eluned was one of the daughters of the 5th-century King Brychan of Brycheiniog and, as a Christian, she refused a pagan prince's marriage proposal and fled from him. At Slwch Tump, the local lord permitted her to build herself a cell, where she lived until her spurned suitor found her. As she ran from him, he cut off her head with his sword. A spring of water appeared and her cell became a small church, which remained on the site, latterly in a ruinous state, until 1698. Before the Reformation, the spring was associated with healing and other miracles.

== See also ==
- List of hillforts in Wales
- List of tumps
