= Y Garn Goch =

Hill in Carmarthenshire, Wales

Coordinates: 51.902°N 3.905°W

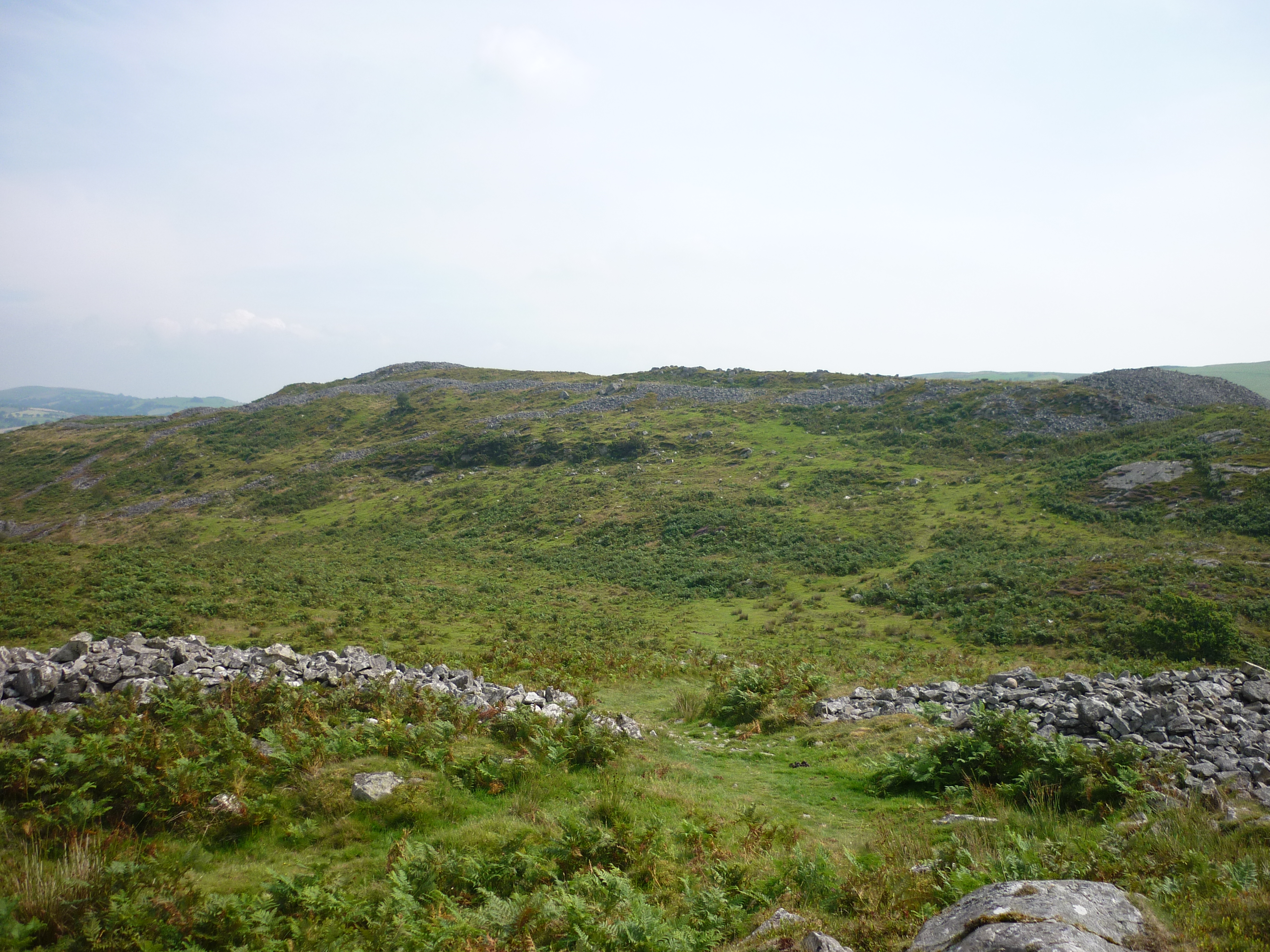
The remains of the larger Iron Age fort from within the remains of the smaller one.

Y Garn Goch is a hill in the Brecon Beacons National Park in the east of Carmarthenshire, Wales. The name means the 'red cairn'. It lies near the village of Bethlehem, three miles southwest of Llangadog and four miles east of Llandeilo on the southern side of the broad Towy Valley. It is also commonly known as either Garn Goch or Carn Goch. Current owners and land managers are the Bannau Brycheiniog National Park Authority.

== Geology ==
Y Garn Goch is formed from the coarse sandstones of the Ffairfach Grit Formation of the early Ordovician period. A northeast-southwest oriented anticline (the Garn Goch Anticline) which runs through Y Garn Goch can be seen to fold these rocks. The sandstones and mudstones of the Abergwilli (sic) and Llandeilo Flags formations form the lower slopes of the hill to north and south. A fault runs northeast-southwest through the saddle between the two tops and is considered a part of the Welsh Borderland Fault System.

The lower ground is mantled by glacial till, a legacy of the last ice age when the valley was filled by the Towy Valley glacier. The hill lies within Fforest Fawr Geopark designated in respect of the outstanding geological heritage of the region.

== Archaeology ==
The established view is that Y Garn Goch is notable for the two impressive Iron Age hillforts of Y Gaer Fawr, (English: the big fort) and Y Gaer Fach, (English: the little fort), together the largest in southern Wales.

== Access ==
The entire hill is registered common land and hence freely available to walkers as access land. It is approached by minor cul-de-sac roads from east and west and a public footpath runs north-south across it. The Beacons Way which starts at Llangadog passes through the nearby village of Bethlehem before running west-east over the hill en route for the Black Mountain (Welsh: Y Mynydd Du) and eventually Abergavenny.

== See also ==
- List of hillforts in Wales
