= Gaer Fawr, Llanilar =

Hillfort in Ceredigion, Wales

Coordinates: 52°19′48″N 3°58′48″W

Gaer Fawr is an Iron Age hill fort located near Llanilar, Ceredigion, Wales; the Ordnance Survey grid reference is SN648718.

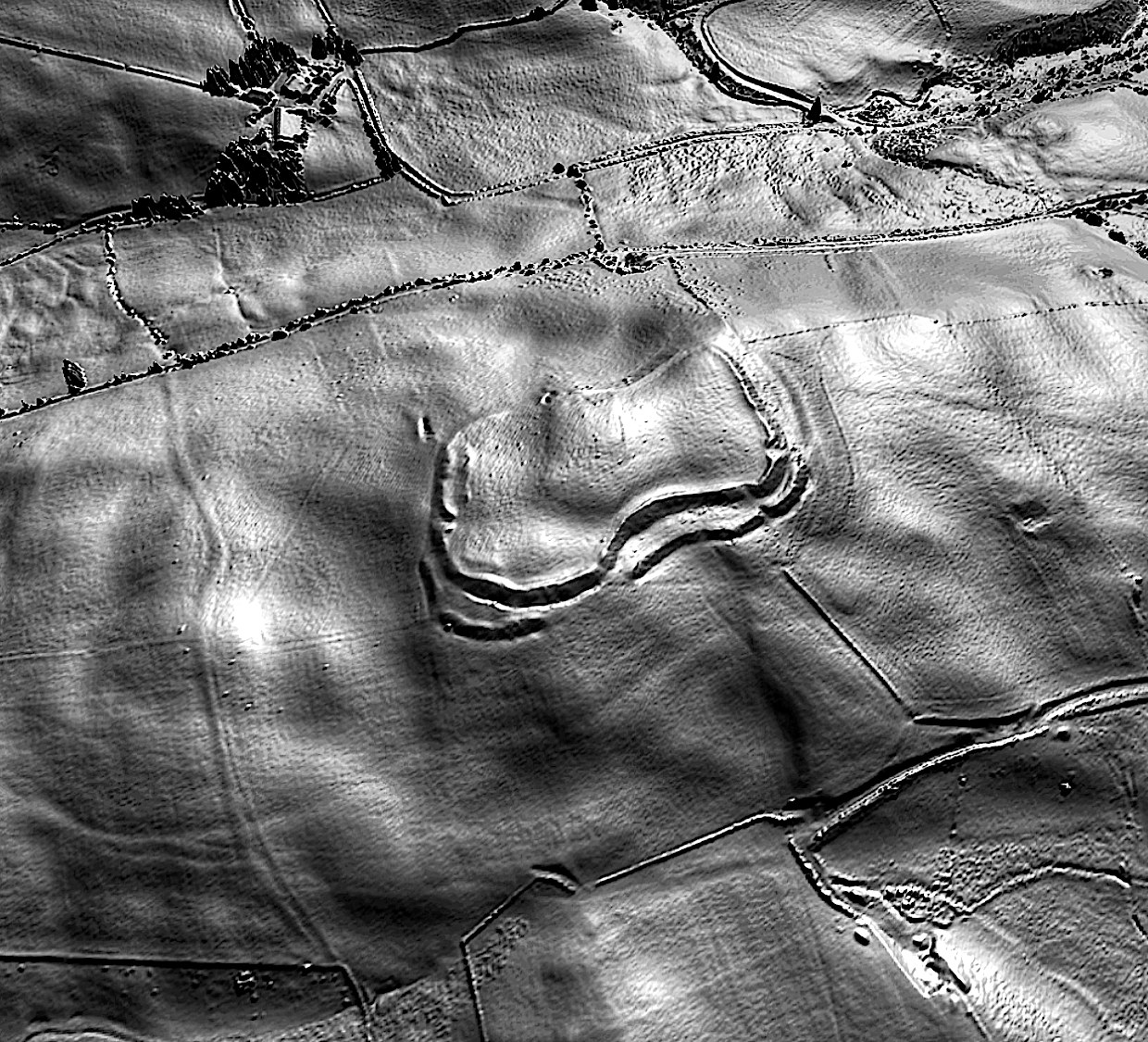
A lidar view of Gaer Fawr.

The fort is registered with Cadw under reference number CD050. There are approximately 300 of these forts on the Cadw list, although archaeologists note that there are about 570 of them in Wales.

== See also ==
- List of hill forts in Wales
- Stone circle
