= Bryn Eryr =

Building recreated at St Fagans National Museum of History, Cardiff, Wales

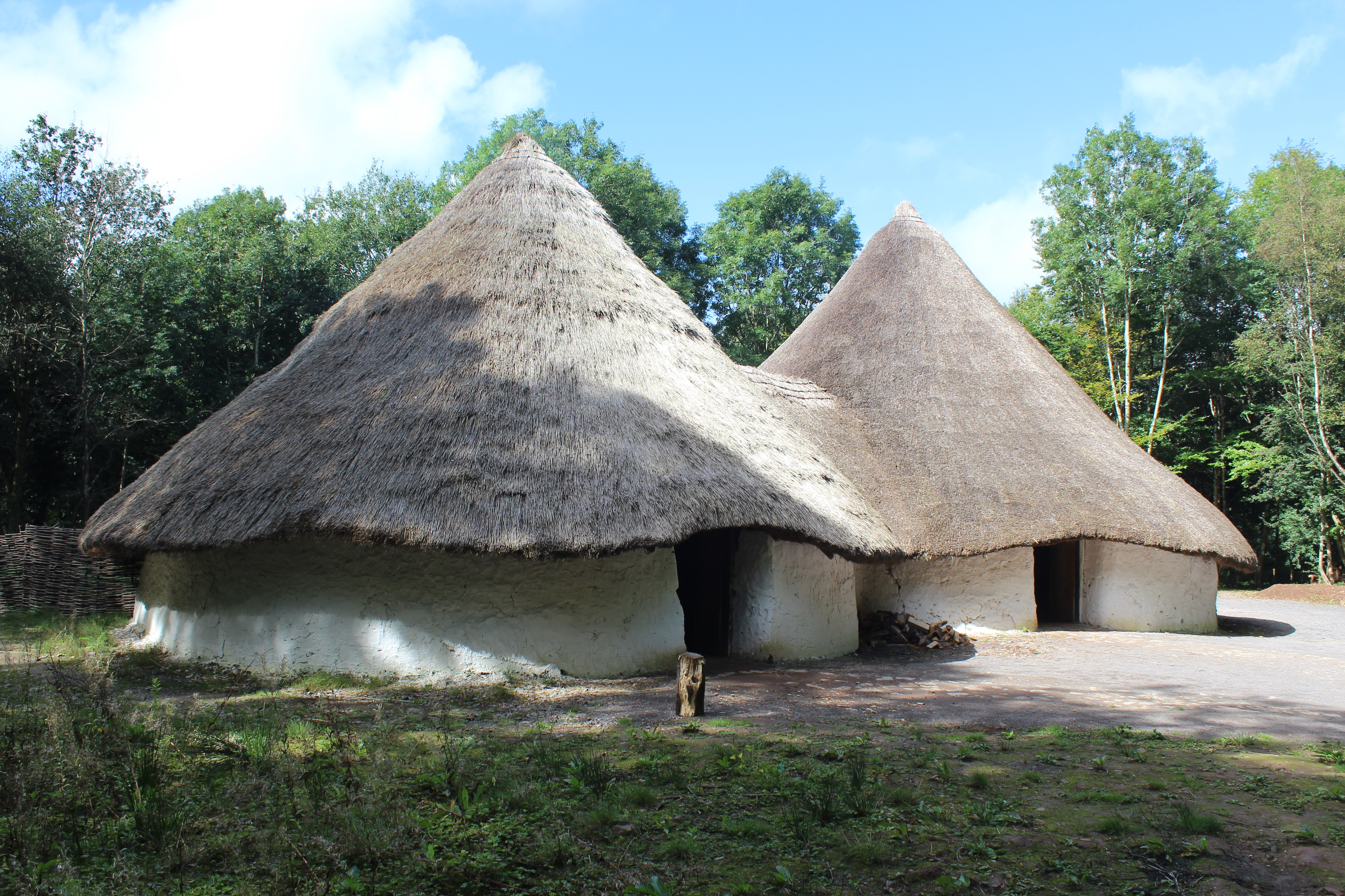
Bryn Eryr Farmstead reconstruction in the St Fagans National History Museum in 2016

Bryn Eryr is an archaeological site near Llansadwrn, Anglesey, Wales, where the remains of an Iron Age farmstead, consisting of three roundhouses, have been excavated. Excavations took place in the period between 1985 and 1987, and were carried out by the Gwynedd Archaeological Trust.

Two of the roundhouses have been reconstructed at the St Fagans National Museum of History in Cardiff. Reconstruction of the buildings began in 2015 and was carried out mainly by volunteers, including schoolchildren. It was part of a development financed by a £11.5 million grant from the UK's Heritage Lottery Fund. It was opened to the public in 2016.

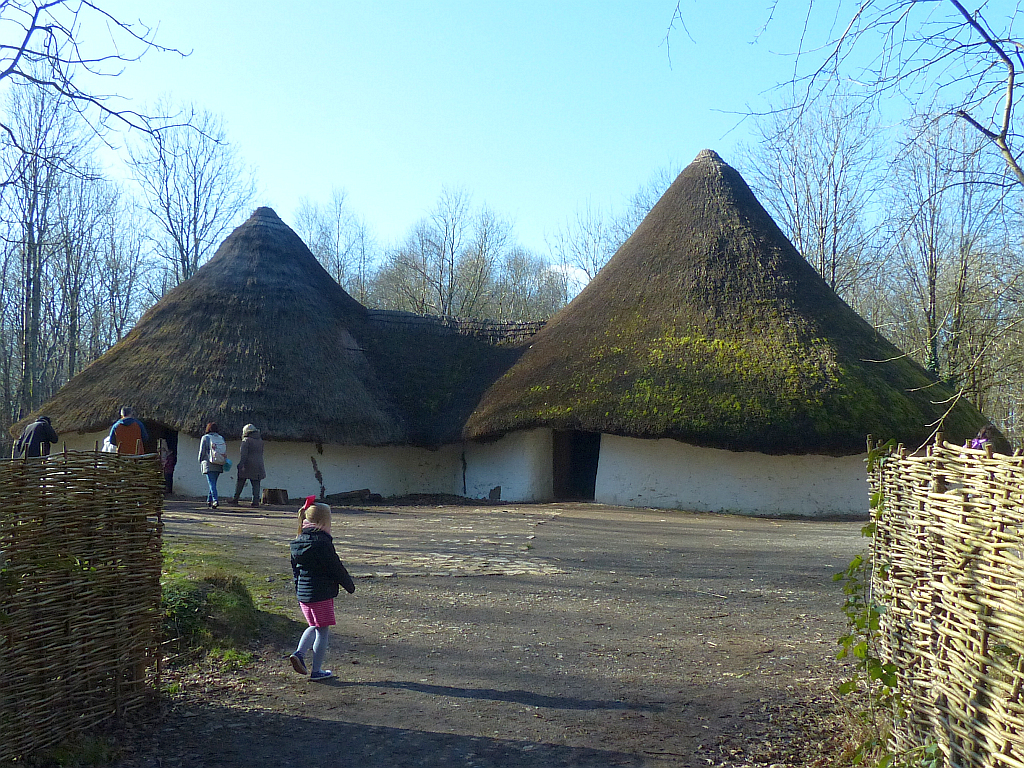
Bryn Eryr reconstruction

== See also ==
- Holyhead Mountain Hut Circles - the remains of a group of Iron Age huts near Trearddur on Holy Island, Anglesey
- Prehistoric Wales
