= Bethlehem, Carmarthenshire =

Village in Carmarthenshire, Wales

Coordinates: 51.91246°N 3.91321°W

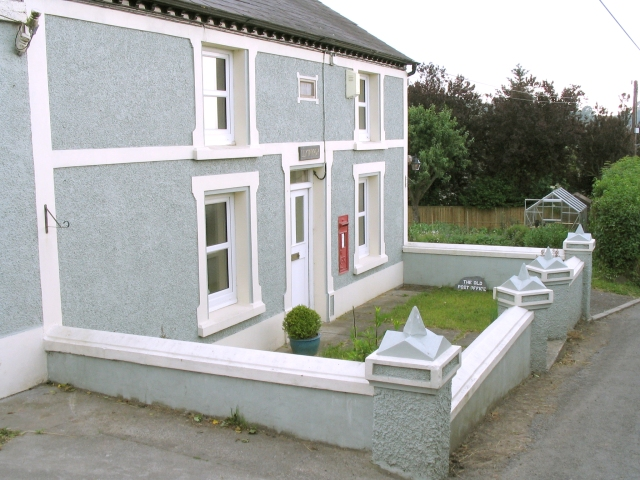
The former post office in Bethlehem in 2005

Bethlehem is a tiny farming village in the county of Carmarthenshire, Wales, lying in the Tywi Valley northeast of Llandeilo and southwest of Llangadog but on the opposite side of the river from the busy London to Haverfordwest road, the A40.

The centre of the village is approximately in front of the six houses opposite the village hall, with other houses, the Primary School, and a former Post Office scattered up and down the hill. The Nonconformist chapel after which the village was named is on a side road that follows the western edge of the Brecon Beacons.

== Location and history ==
Bethlehem is overlooked by Carn Goch, a significant Iron Age hillfort with great heaps of stones remaining from the original ramparts. Bethlehem is around six miles (10 km) from Dinefwr castle, capital of the pre-Norman Deheubarth kingdom and around six miles (10 km) from the important and majestic Carreg Cennen castle that arose later.

The alternative rock band Strangelove lived in a house just outside the village of Bethlehem through much of 1996 and wrote all of their third and final album there. Singer Patrick Duff composed a number of the songs while sitting on the stones on top of Carn Goch. He also became great friends with Bethlehem's post master at that time.

== Etymology ==
William Morgan translated the Bible into the Welsh language in 1588, and translated the Aramaic name for Christ's birthplace into the name we are familiar with. The village chapel was given the same name. Previously known as Dyffryn Ceidrich (valley of Ceidrich), the village came to be known by the name of the chapel, probably during the great Welsh Methodist revival in Wales of the 19th century.

== Events ==
Every year, the village hosts a traditional Christmas market. A major attraction is to post Christmas cards from the village to get a Bethlehem postmark, a practice that first gained national attention in about 1965.
