= Saint Eluned =

5c Welsh saint

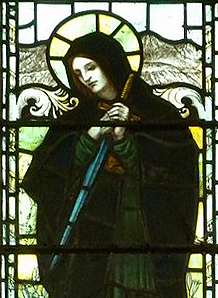
- Eluned at Brecon, Wales

Virgin and martyr
- Born: c. AD 468
- Died: 6th century
- Feast: 1 August

Saint Eluned (Welsh: Eiliwedd; Latin: Almedha or Elevetha), also known as Aled and by other names, was a 5th- or 6th-century virgin martyr from the area of modern Breconshire. George Phillips, writing for the Catholic Encyclopedia, calls her "the Luned of the Mabinogion and the Lynette of Tennyson's Gareth and Lynette."

== Legend ==
One of the many daughters of King Brychan of Brycheiniog in South Wales (a sub-Roman monarch who embraced the new faith of Christianity), Eluned became a Christian at a young age. She spurned the advances of a pagan prince and, like many women of her time, ran away to avoid being forced into the relationship. She travelled first to Llan Ddew where she was ousted by the locals, then to Llanfilo. Here again, she was ousted by the inhabitants, on the pretext of thievery. She then travelled to Llechfaen, where she was again thrown out of the community. She would not find peace until her arrival at Slwch Tump, where the local lord gave her protection. However, Eluned's pursuer found her. When she ran from him, he chased her down the hill and beheaded her. Her head rolled down the hill and hit a stone; as in the story of Saint Winefride, a healing spring burst from that spot.

There is a reference to Eluned in the work of William Worcester (c. 1415–1485). He refers to the saint's remains as being housed in the priory church at Usk, home to a community of Benedictine nuns founded sometime before 1135 by Richard de Clare.

== Veneration ==
When the Normans arrived in the 11th century, her well at Slwch was associated with healing and other miracles. Like many other such sites, the holy well and church of Eluned were destroyed in the Reformation. In his 1698 essay on the history of Brecknockshire, Welsh historian Hugh Thomas speaks of the chapel, in his time, as

"standing, though unroofed and useless; the people thereabouts call it St. Tayled [St. Aled]. It was situated on an eminence, about a mile to the eastward of Brecknock, and about half a mile from a farm-house, formerly the mansion and residence of the Aubreys, lords of the manor of Slwch, which lordship was bestowed upon Sir Reginald Awbrey by Bernard Newmarche, in the reign of William Rufus. Some small vestiges of this building may still be traced, and an aged yew tree, with a well at its foot, marks the site near which the chapel formerly stood."

Her feast day is 1 August, the same day a pagan harvest festival (Lughnasadh or Lammas) was celebrated.
