= Pen-y-crug =

Hill (331m) in Powys, Wales

Coordinates: 51.9627°N 3.4142°W

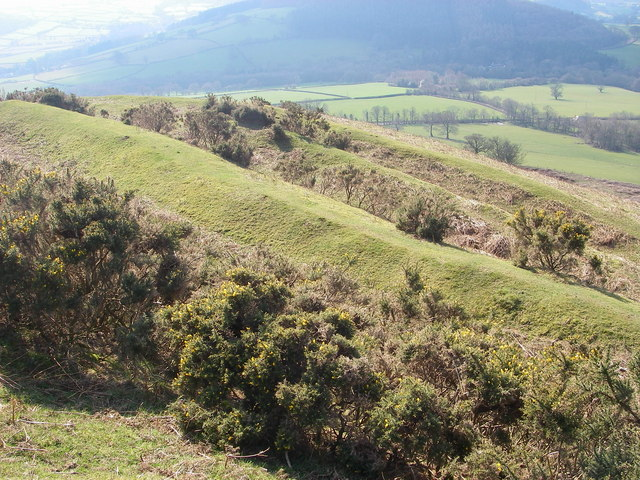
Ramparts of Pen-y-crug hill fort

Pen-y-crug is a hill in the Brecon Beacons National Park in the county of Powys, south Wales. It is commonly referred to locally as simply 'The Crug' (pronounced cree-g). The Welsh name signifies 'top of the mound'. It slopes are moderately gently on three sides; only to the west do they steepen somewhat. Its flat trig point adorned summit at 331m overlooks the valley of the River Usk to the south. To the southeast are panoramic views over Brecon whilst eastwards are the Black Mountains and south the Brecon Beacons.

== Geology ==
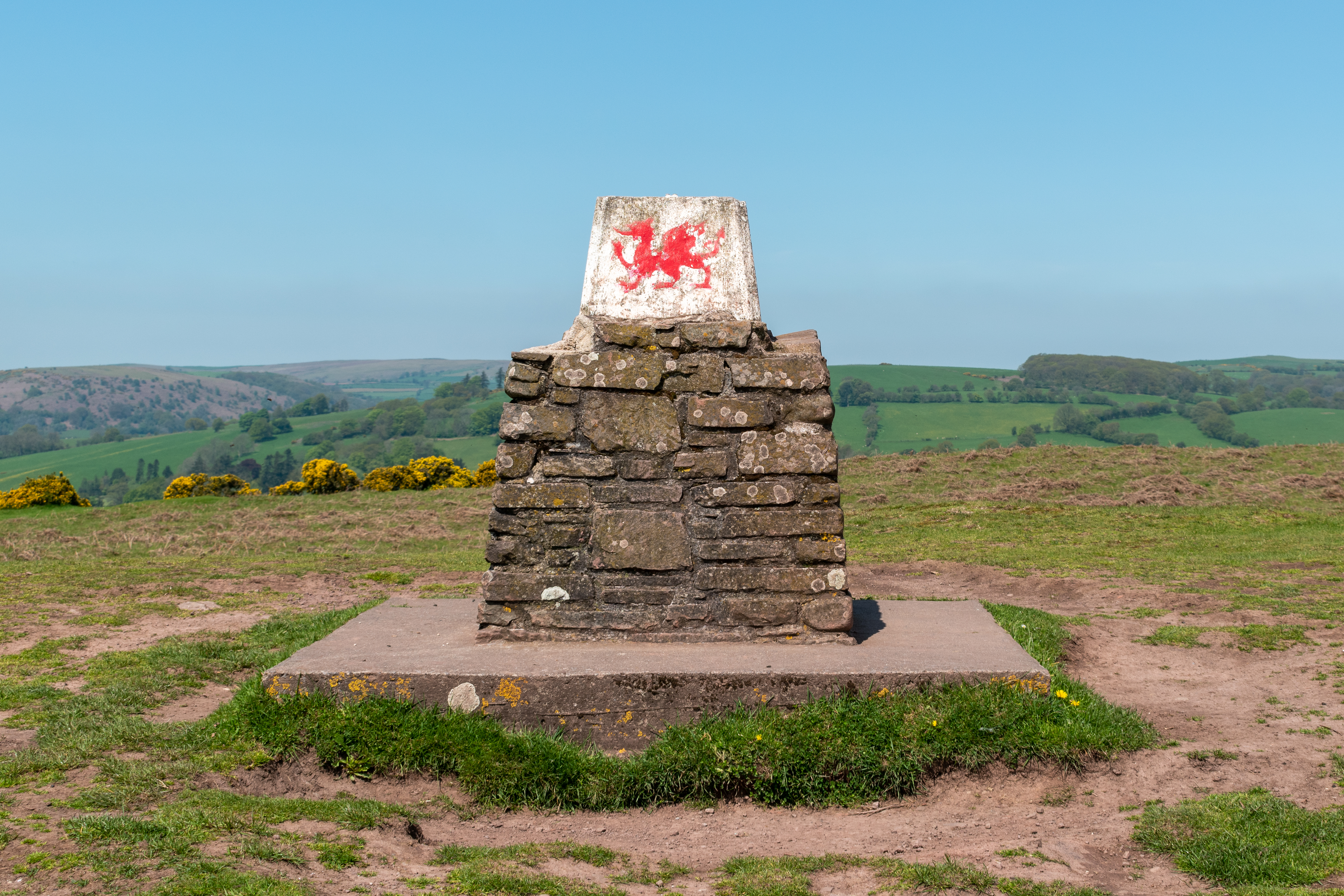
Trig point at the summit of Pen-y-crug

The hill is formed from sandstones and mudstones of the St. Maughans Formation of the Old Red Sandstone laid down during the Devonian period. The lower slopes are formed from mudstones and sandstones of the Raglan Mudstone Formation of late Silurian age. A number of small sandstone quarries, now disused, adorn the upper slopes. The hill probably stood out above the Usk Valley glacier ice at times during the ice age.

== Access ==
A bridleway runs northwestwards over the northern and eastern slopes of the hill from the B4520 road on the northern edge of Brecon giving access to walkers, horseriders and mountain-bikers. A public footpath also leads to the summit from the edge of Brecon via Maen-du Well. The upper slopes are open access for walkers. A small car park off the minor road to its north provides a convenient starting point for many walkers.

== Archaeology ==
LIDAR showing the Iron Age hillfort

The summit is crowned by an impressive Iron Age hillfort, one of several in the Usk Valley.

There are the remains of a brick and tile works dating from Victorian times on its southeastern flank.

== See also ==
- List of hillforts in Wales
