= Holyhead Mountain Hut Circles =

Iron age settlement on Holy island, Wales

Coordinates: 53.3054°N 4.6838°W

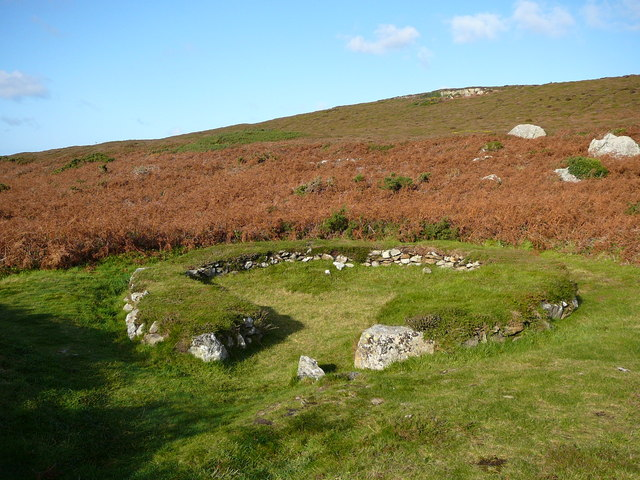
One of the circular huts

The Holyhead Mountain Hut Circles (Welsh: Tŷ Mawr, lit. 'big house'; or Cytiau'r Gwyddelod, 'Irishmen's huts') are the remains of a group of Celtic Iron Age huts near Trearddur on Holy Island, Anglesey, Wales. The site is under the care of Cadw and can be visited all year round. The construction of these huts is very similar to those at Din Lligwy, having thick stone walls.

== Hut group ==
The hut group is located on a level terrace that traverses the southwestern end of Holyhead Mountain. The precise age of the hut group is not clear. Much of the site is thought to date from the Iron Age but the settlement may have been in existence over an extended period of time from the Neolithic to the Dark Ages, with different buildings being in use at different times.

The Iron Age hut circles were excavated by William Owen Stanley of Penrhos, Anglesey (son of Baron Stanley of Alderley). Stanley wrote his findings in the 1869 academic journal edition of the Archaeologia Cambrensis. He published the findings on the Ty Mawr hut circles with help from Augustus Lane Fox from the 1862 and 1868 excavations. From the 50 buildings found, 20 survive today. The site was later in a state of guardianship as of 1911 and was cleared of its artifacts in 1912-1913 and was again excavated in 1978 and 1982. Originally believed to be of during the centuries of Roman occupation of Wales, there was coin hoard and Ancient Roman pottery found. However, through Radiocarbon dating the site was determined to be from c. 1,000 BC.

About twenty huts have been reconstructed; each would originally have had a conical roof, supported by poles set on top of a low wall, covered with turf or thatch. Some of the huts are homesteads; these are mostly circular and hearths, alcoves, and a stone trough have been identified. Others are oval and have a dividing wall, still others are entered by long passages, and some are small, and may have been used as storerooms or workshops. One building at the northeastern end of the terrace has a walled enclosure or paddock adjoining. Artifacts found at the site include a broken stone axe, flint arrowheads, and pottery fragments from the late Neolithic or early Bronze Age.

== Access ==
This is one of the best-preserved hut groups in Wales. The settlement is to the southeast of the South Stack Lighthouse, on the opposite side of the road from a small car park provided by the Royal Society for the Protection of Birds.

The Holyhead Mountain Hut Circles are under the care of Cadw; the site is open to the public, free of charge, throughout the year, except for 24, 25, and 26 December and New Year's Day. Access is by a stone stile over a wall.

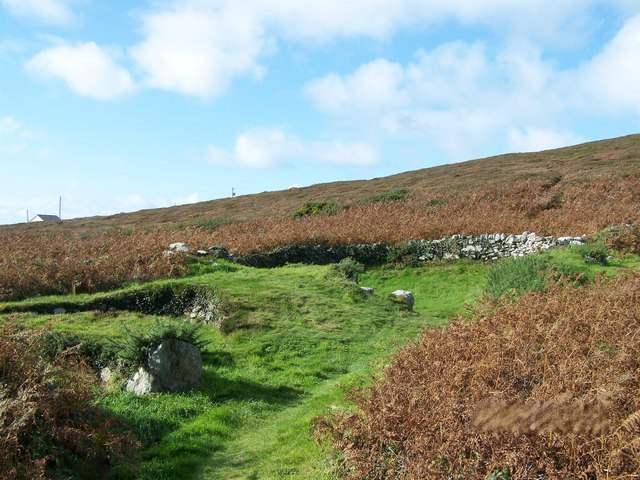
Long passage into one of the huts

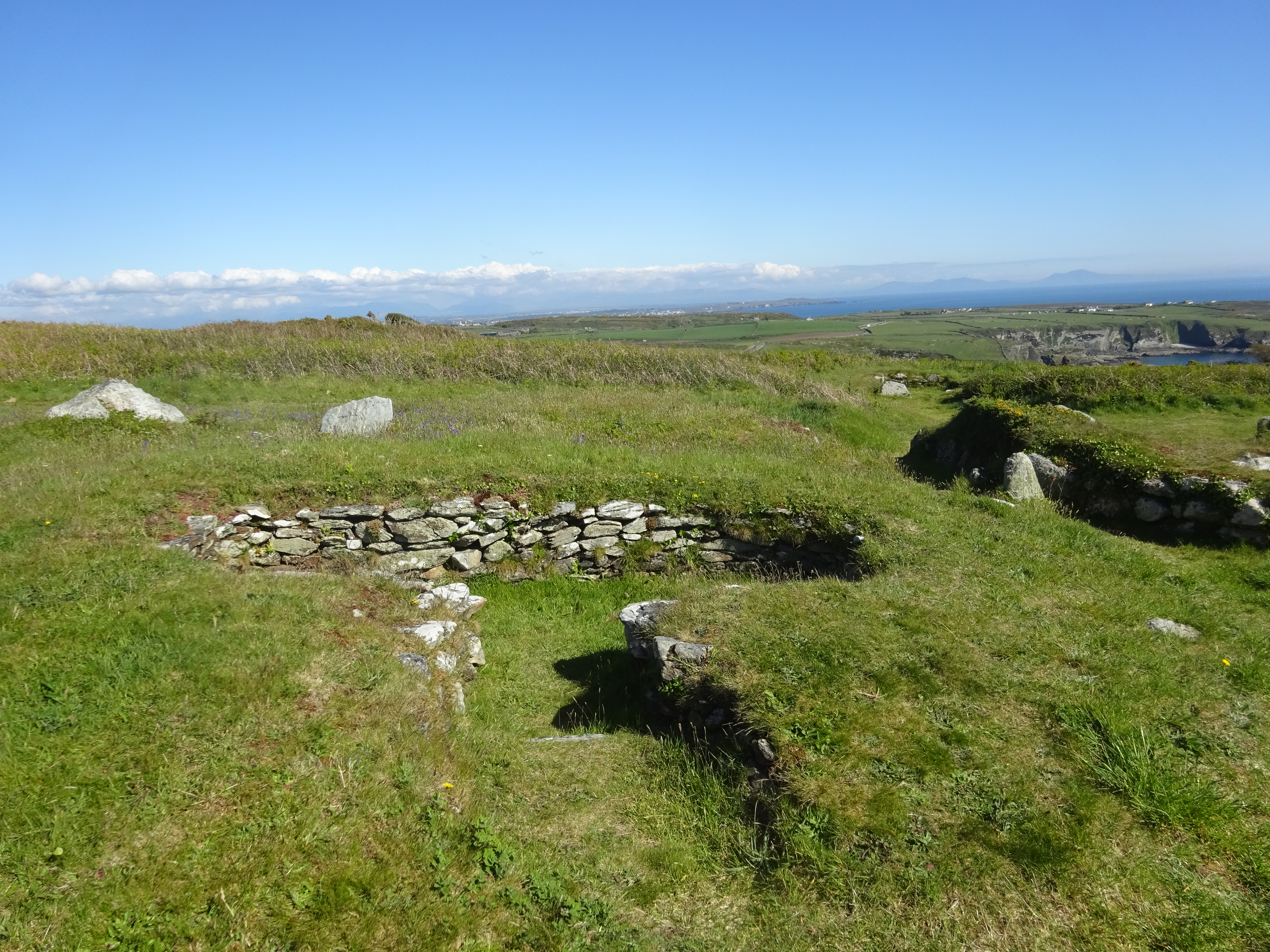
Similar passageway into a rectangular hut

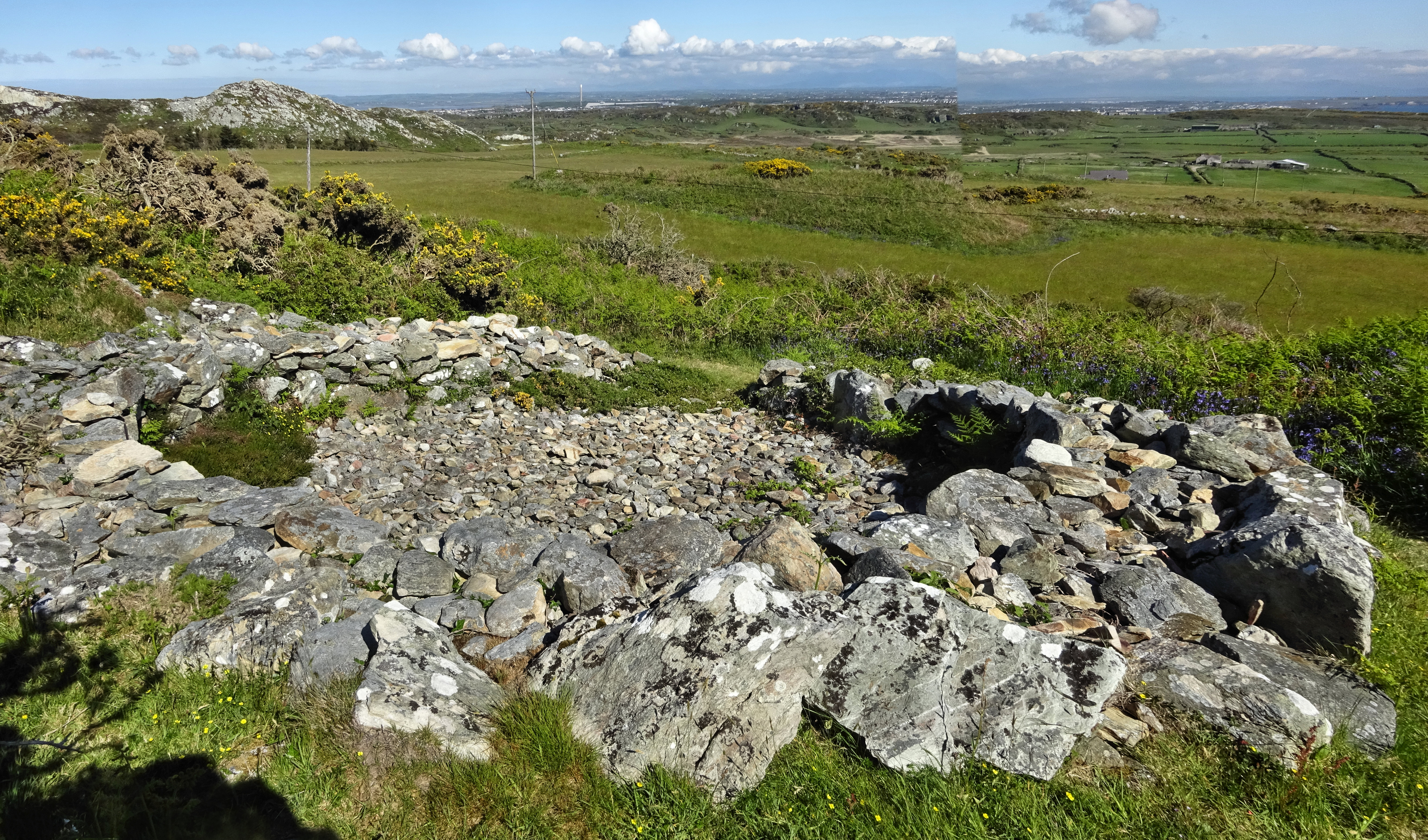
One of the highest huts, going up, onwards to Holyhead Mountain (Mynydd Twr)

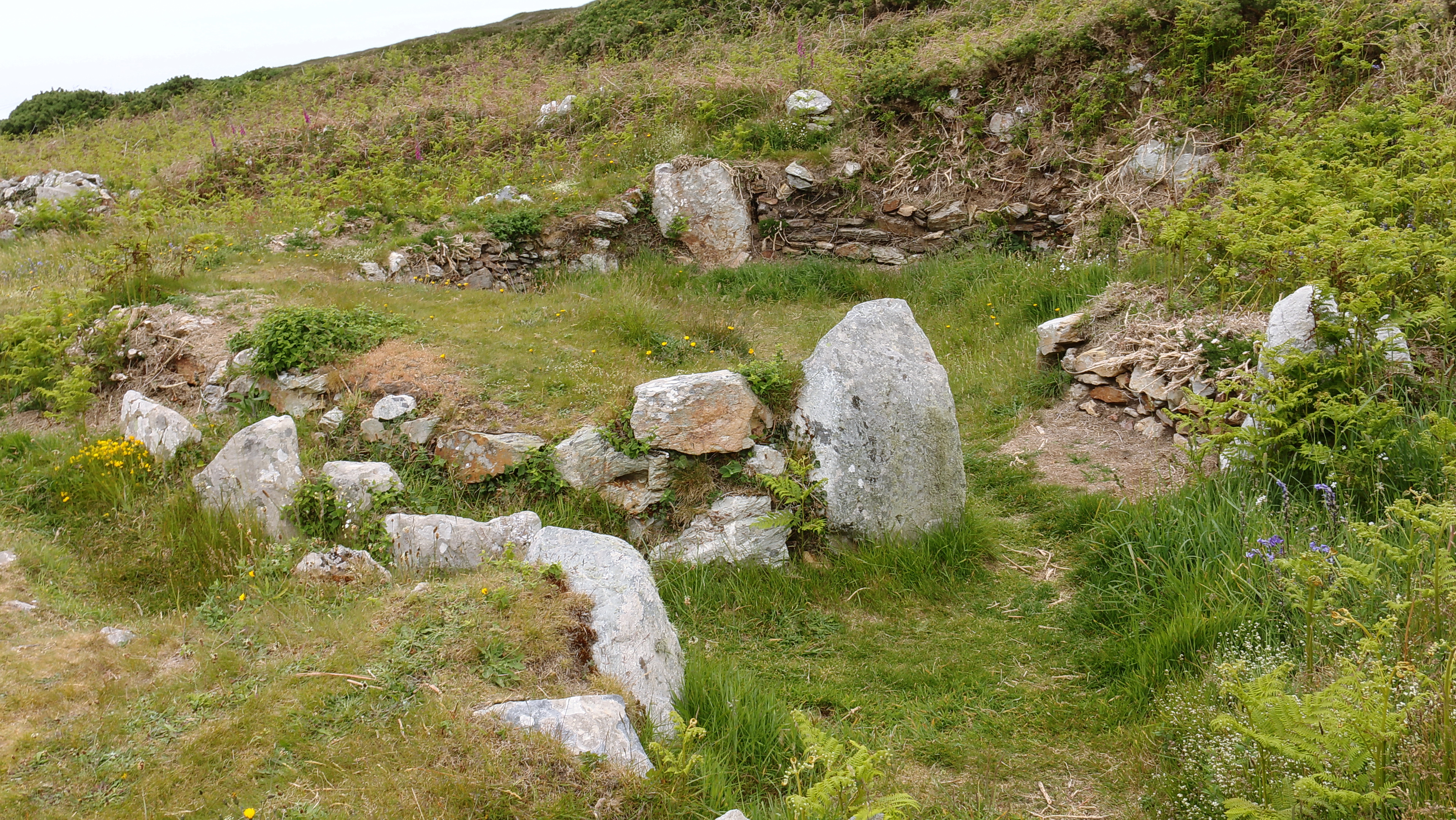
Large boulders can be found here and there

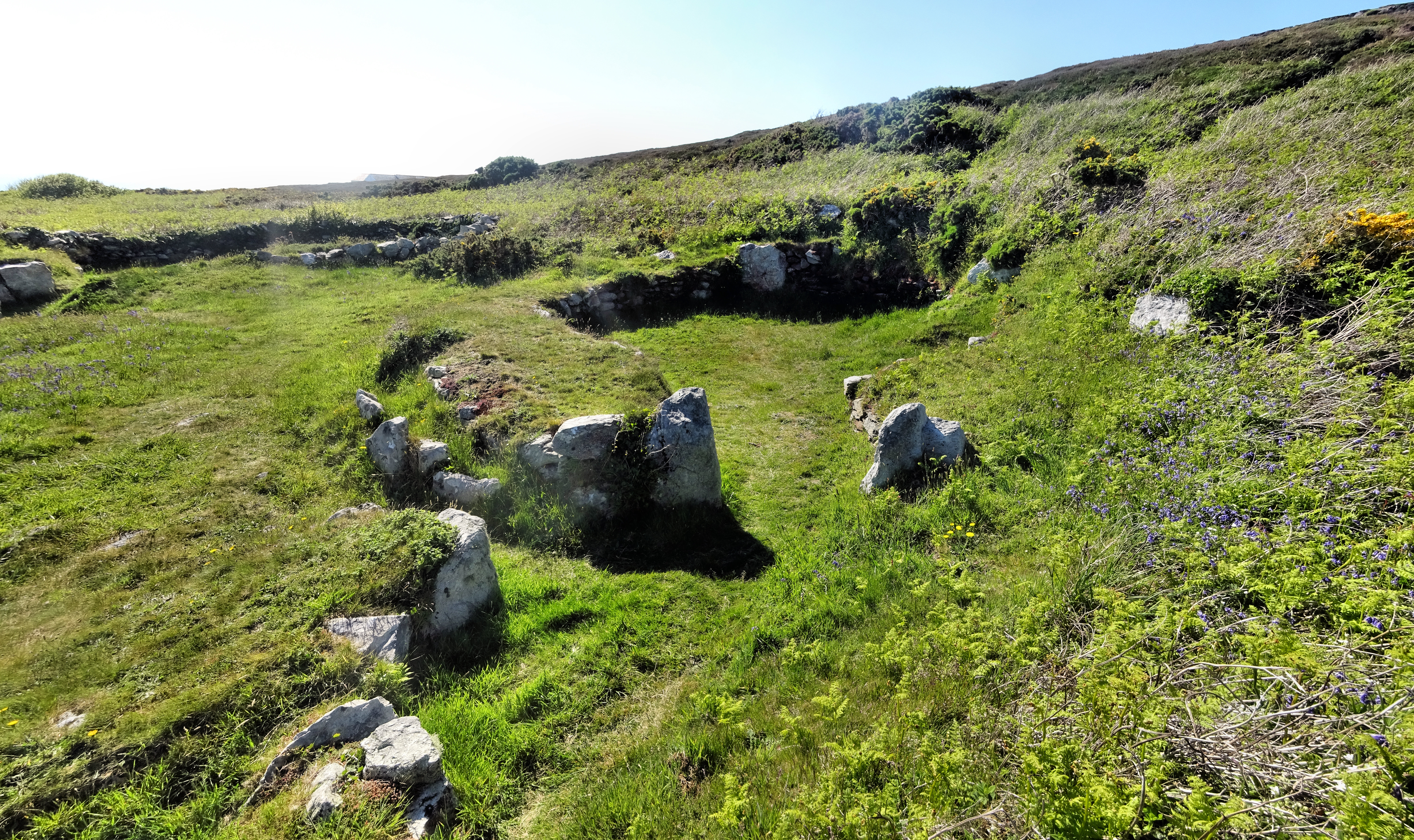

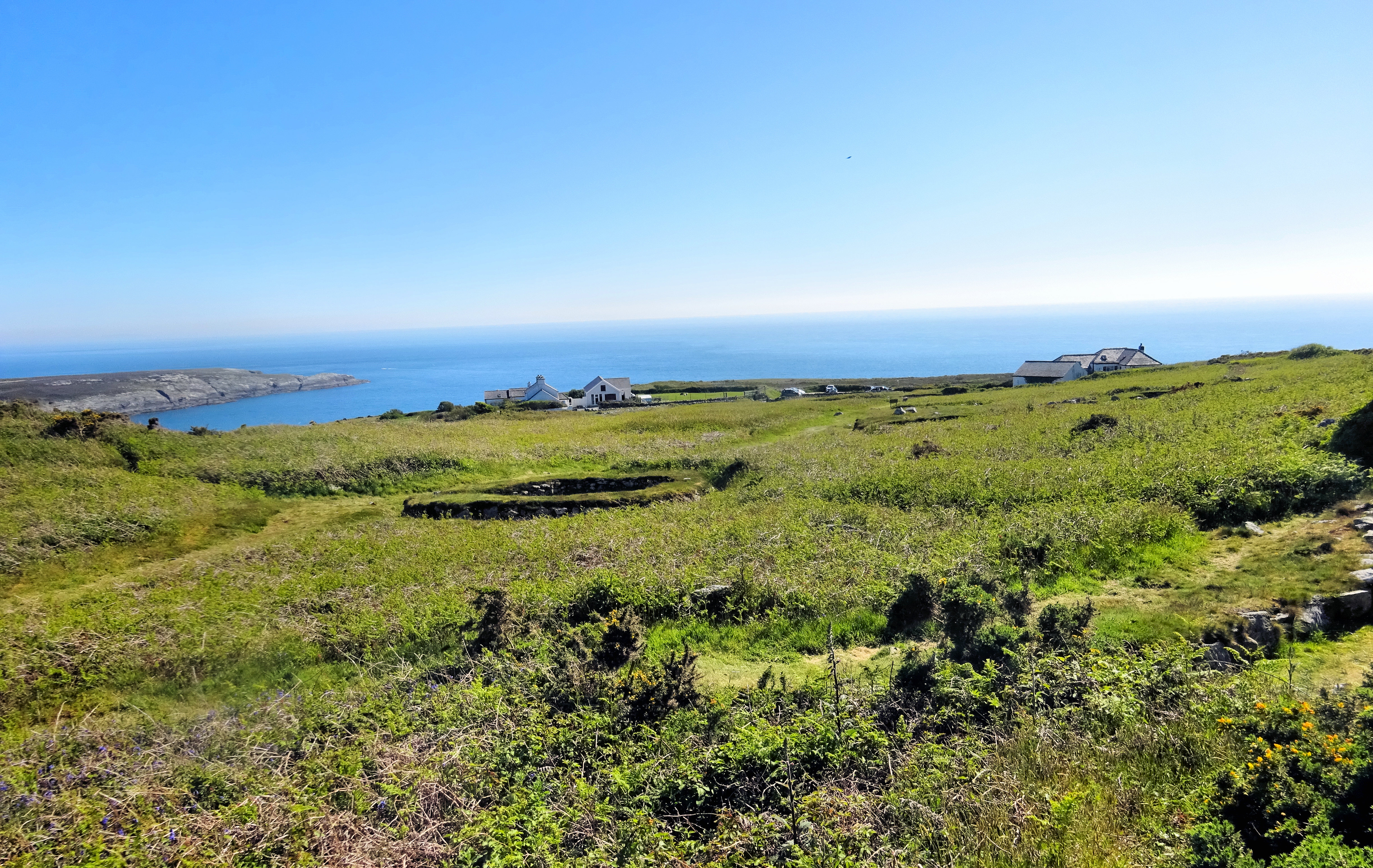
Around six huts can be seen here, in their location c. 300 metres above sea level

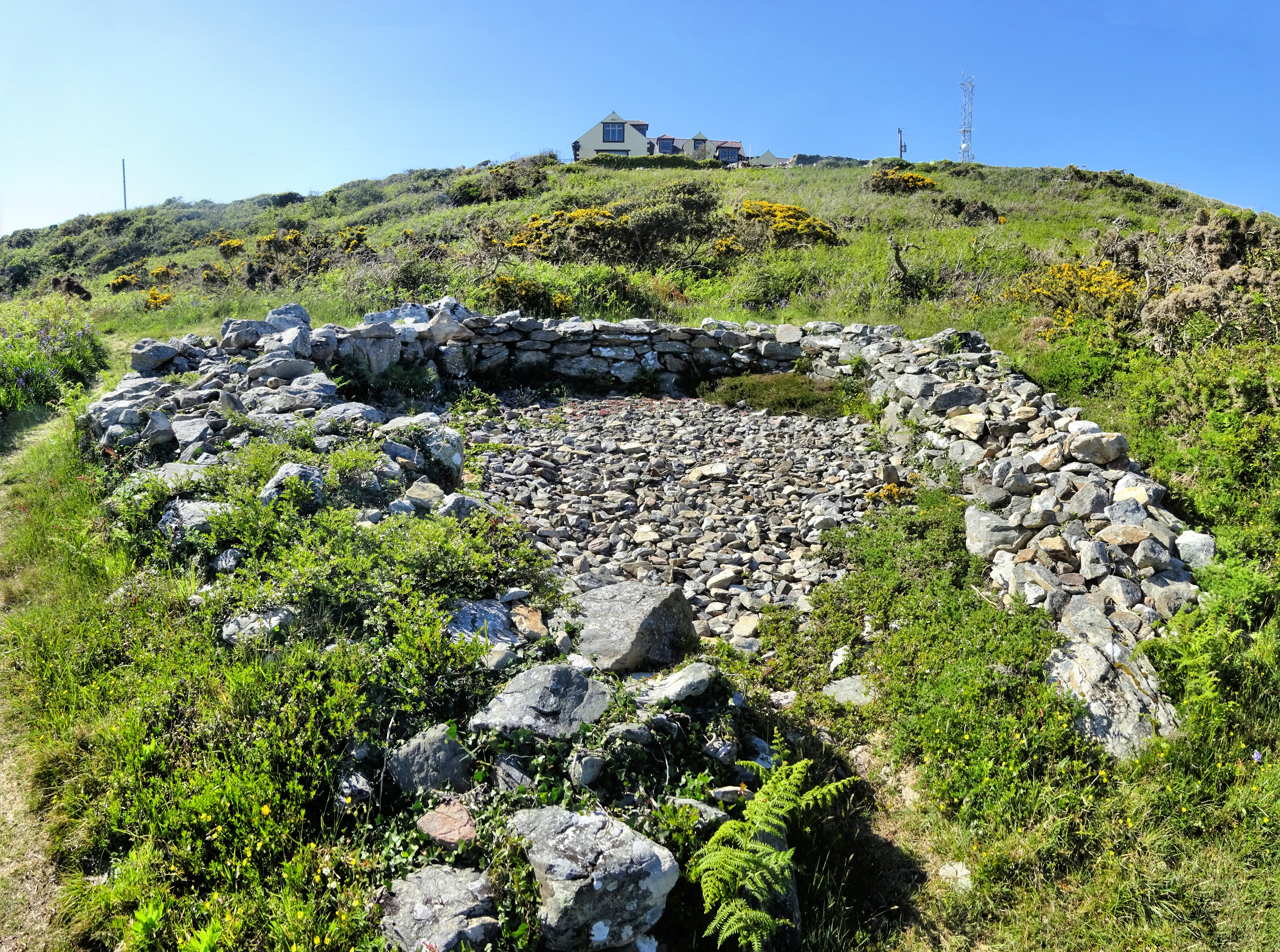
The walls were at one time much higher

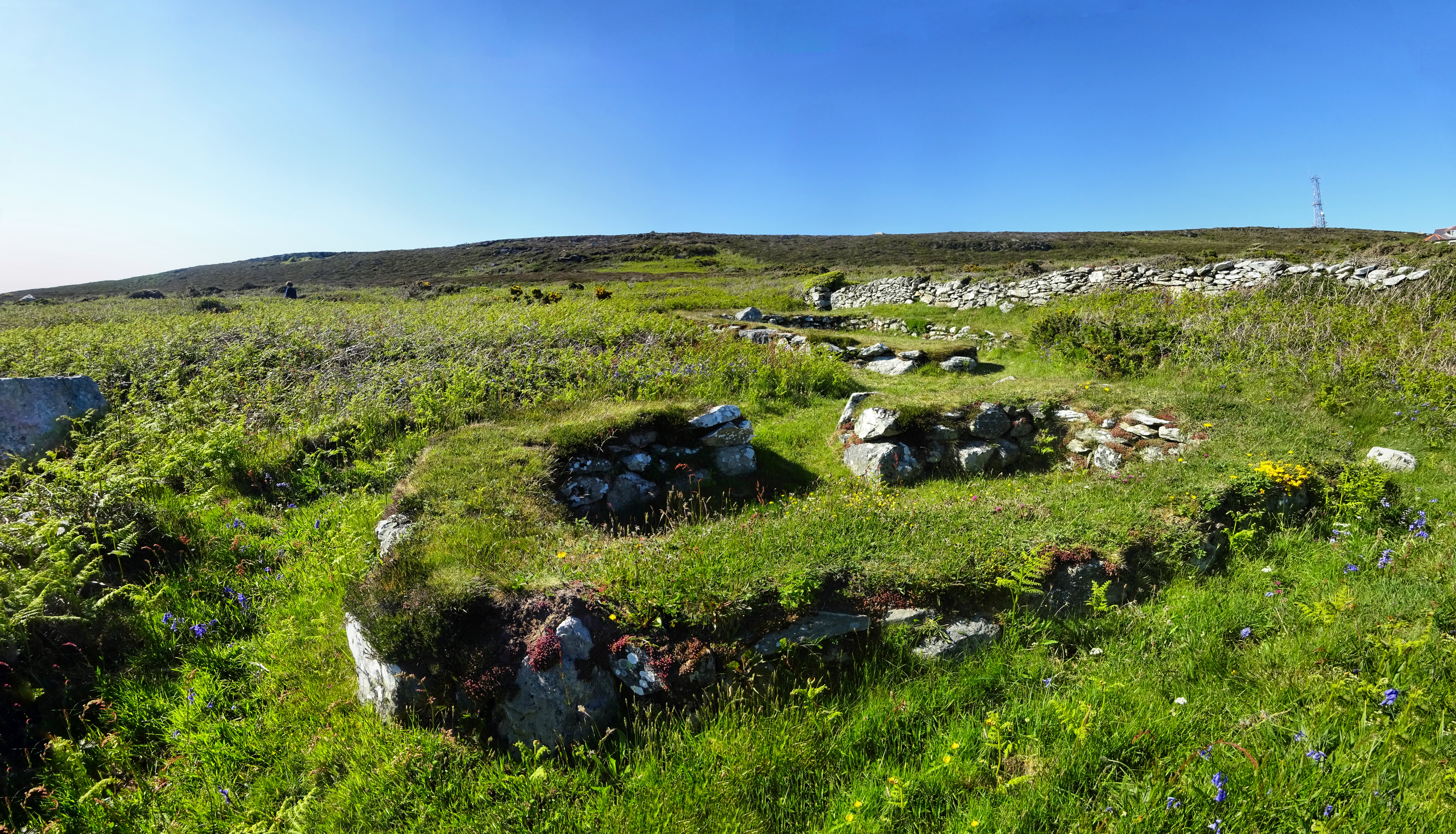

== See also ==
- Bryn Eryr - the remains of an Iron Age farmstead near Llansadwrn, Anglesey
