= Craig Gwrtheyrn =

Hillfort in Carmarthenshire, Wales

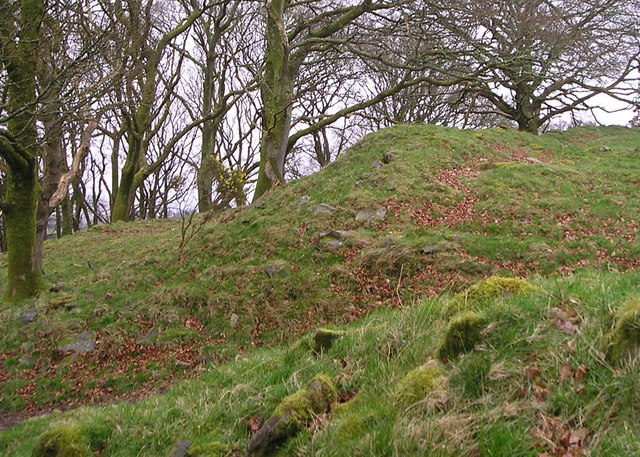
- The entrance to the fort

- Location within Carmarthenshire
- 52°2′18″N 4°17′7″W
- Type: Hillfort
- Periods: Iron Age
- Location: Near Llanfihangel-ar-Arth, Wales
- OS grid reference: SN 433 402

Site notes
- Area: 1.5 hectares (3.7 acres)

Craig Gwrtheyrn, or Caer Gwrtheyrn, is an Iron Age hillfort on the south side of the River Teifi, about 1.2 miles (1.9 km) west of the village of Llanfihangel-ar-Arth, in Carmarthenshire, Wales.

== Description ==
The fort is on an imposing hill overlooking the River Teifi. The defences measure about 160 metres (520 ft) north to south, and 125 metres (410 ft) east to west, following the contours of the hill, enclosing an area of about 1.5 hectares (3.7 acres). The drystone rampart, of which traces remain, was originally 2–3 metres (6.6–9.8 ft) thick. There is a ditch around the rampart (except on the very steep north-east side); stones from the rampart have fallen into this. There is an entrance on the south-west, where two further banks create a barbican and where there is also a small area of chevaux de frise: sharp stones set on end, of which about 30 remain.

== Background ==
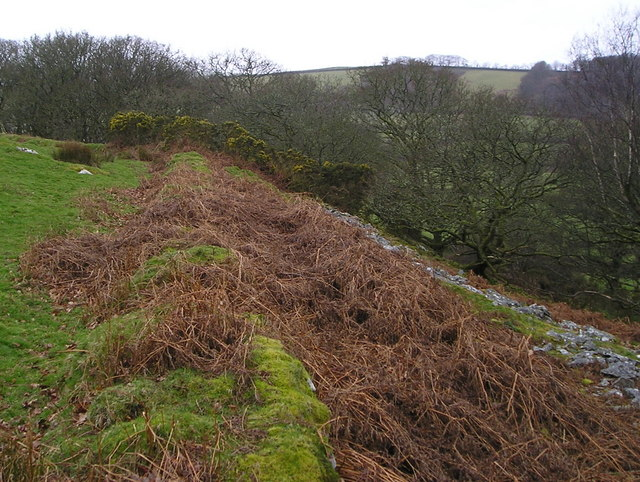
Remains of part of the rampart

Craig Gwrtheyrn (Vortigern's Rock), or Caer Gwrtheyrn (Vortigern's Castle), is associated with the 5th-century British warlord Vortigern. He may be mythical; there are various historical accounts written in subsequent centuries in which he seems to be described. According to one story (in Historia Brittonum, compiled in the 9th century) Vortigern, fleeing from St Germanus, built a castle on the River Teifi. A fire, brought from heaven by the prayers of St Germanus, who had followed him there, set the castle alight; Vortigern, his family and other inhabitants of the castle perished.

There are other versions of Vortigern's death, and other places where it is claimed he was buried. It is not known if the hillfort acquired its name later or earlier than this legend associated with it.

== See also ==
- Hillforts in Britain
- List of Scheduled prehistoric Monuments in Carmarthenshire
