= Clegyr Boia =

Prehistoric site in Pembrokeshire, Wales

- Clegyr Fwya
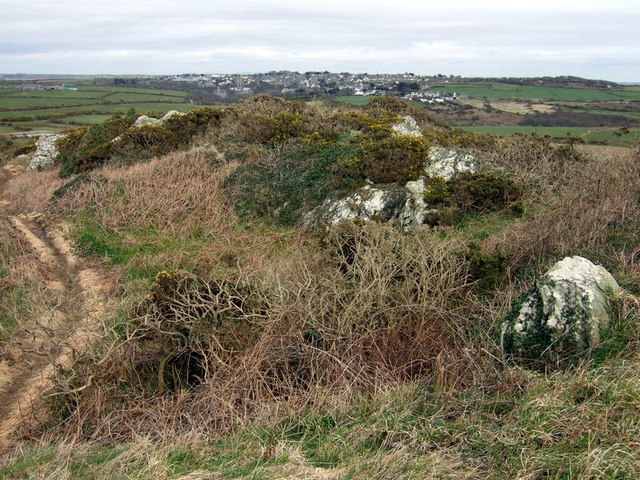
- Clegyr Boia. The eastern end of the hillfort/rock mound looking eastwards, towards the city of St Davids
- Interactive map of Clegyr Boia
- 51.8785°N 5.2885°W
- Type: Settlement, Hillfort
- Periods: Neolithic, Iron Age
- Cultures: Celtic Brittonic
- Location: near St Davids, Pembrokeshire, Wales

Site notes
- Excavation dates: 1902, 1943
- Archaeologists: Sabine Baring-Gould (1902), Audrey Williams (1943)
- Condition: excavated site
- Public access: Yes
- Website: Coflein

Clegyr Boia, or Clegyr Fwya, is a prehistoric site on the St David's peninsula, Pembrokeshire, Wales, 33 to 65 feet (10 to 20 m) above the surrounding area. It is about 1 mile (1.6 km) west of St Davids, and about 0.75 miles (1.21 km) east of the Pembrokeshire coast. The hilltop's rocky outcrop contains evidence of Neolithic and Iron Age settlements. The site's nearest water source was Ffynnon Lygaid, a 1 foot (0.30 m) deep pool, fed by a spring. Near the base of the outcrop's southern side, the pool is in a small hollow, measuring about 1 foot (0.30 m) by 8 inches (0.20 m). The site was excavated in 1902 by Sabine Baring-Gould, and by Audrey Williams, for the Ancient Monuments Inspectorate, in 1943.

The outcrop became the stronghold of a 6th-century CE Irish pirate named Boia, after whom (with clegyr (English: crag)) it is now called.

== Neolithic ==
Evidence of Neolithic settlement in Wales is extremely uncommon. Megalithic burial chambers are normally the only Neolithic structures to survive. However, an excavation of the site by Sabine Baring-Gould, in 1903, showed the remains of rectangular and circular Neolithic dwellings. An associated midden has been dated to around 5500 years before present (BP), during the early to middle Neolithic. Sherds of Neolithic round-bottomed pottery, polished stone axes and animal bones were also discovered. Baring-Gould thought the pottery may have been wheel-turned. No hearths were found within the dwellings. However, "substantial" charcoal deposits were found on the site, indicating fire was used, and carefully managed. Samples from the area of Neolithic occupation (hut and midden), radiocarbon dated in 1973, indicated a date of around 2370 BP, the beginning of La Tène culture, at the early British Iron Age, but were considered unacceptable by the National Museum Wales.

== Iron Age ==
The hill's steep sides were augmented by a single earthen rampart, to form a defensive structure known as a hillfort. The outcrop's southern part was further enclosed by stone walls, roughly rectangular, and measuring about 280 feet (85 m) by 100 feet (30 m). Built as a dry-stone wall, from stone rubble and earth, the ramparts stand about 2 feet 6 inches (1 m) above the enclosure floor. Revetted with stone blocks, the walls varied between 9 feet (2.7 m) and 15 feet (4.6 m) wide and were "faced externally with large slabs set on end". According to Baring-Gould, the enclosure's original surface was 2 feet 6 inches (1 m) below its 1903 level. The enclosure's entrance may have been through a tunnel. Radiocarbon dated samples from near the hillfort entrance indicate a date of around 1950 BP (1 BCE), the late Iron Age.
