= Thomas Bolton (microscopist) =

English businessman, zoologist, and microscopist

- Born: 1831; Kinver
- Died: 7 November 1887
- Resting place: Kinver
- Occupations: Zoologist, microscopist, businessperson, works manager
- Awards: Fellow of the Royal Microscopical Society; Civil List pension (1886)

Thomas Bolton (1831–1887) was an English businessman, zoologist, and microscopist, who specialised in collecting and supplying specimens, especially living rotifers and other infusoria, to other microscopists by post, from his business in Birmingham, England. He discovered and described several putative new species, although his descriptions are not now recognised under the rules of formal zoological taxonomy. A number of leading contemporary scientists acknowledged his work and some named species after him. His scientific contributions were also recognised by the award of a civil list pension, at the behest of leading scientists.

== Early life ==
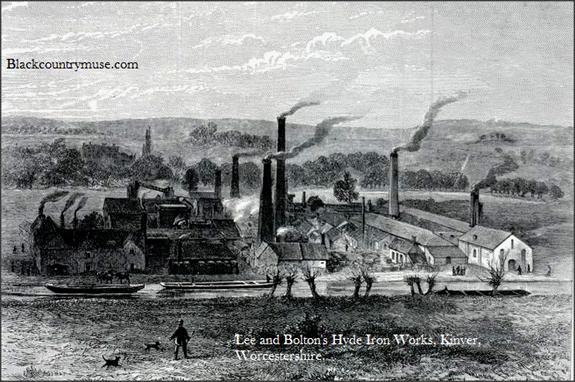
Lee and Bolton's Hyde Iron Works, Kinver (undated)

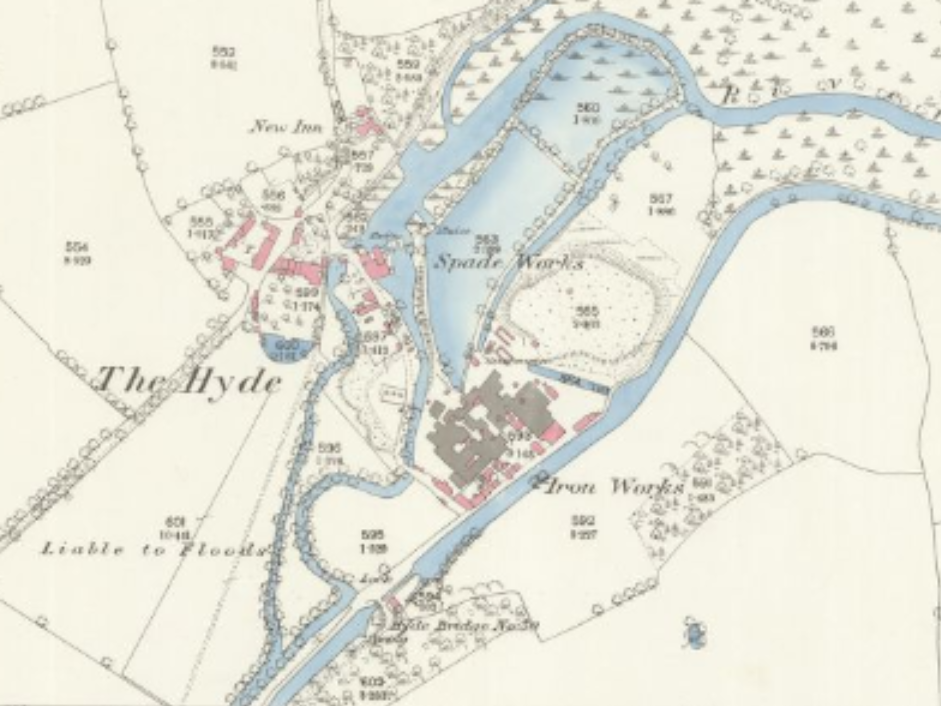
The Hyde, Kinver on OS 25 inch map sheet LXX.12 of 1882, showing the iron works and (unlabelled) Hyde Pool. (Note: Map image centred approximately on 52.456941°N 2.220740°W) The River Stour it is paralleled to its south by the Staffordshire and Worcestershire Canal.

Bolton was born in 1831 at Kinver, South Staffordshire, and baptised at St. Peter's Church, Kinver, on 7 September that year. He was the son of another Thomas Bolton (1796–1851), an iron master and partner in the firm of Lee and Bolton, who owned Hyde Iron Works, and of Thomas' wife Elizabeth, née Perry.

He was educated at Kinver Grammar School, and then at King's College, London. He passed the 1851 matriculation examination to enter London University, gaining honours in mathematics and natural philosophy, with a view to studying as an engineer. However, the death of his father in October 1851 necessitated his return to Kinver and entry into the business.

He married Julia Charlotte (née Turner) on 15 August 1860 at St. Mary, Stoke Newington, Hackney, London.

Bolton was active in local community work, especially in regard to education, He was instrumental in the establishment of the area's first board school, set up and managed evening classes, and became governor of Kinver Grammar School (a role he maintained until his death). He also assisted the local Young Men's Mutual Improvement Society, and served as churchwarden. In 1867 he was an exam board secretary for the Society of Arts. At that time and into the mid 1870s he gave his address as Hyde House, Kinver, and wrote about collecting specimens in "Hyde Pool".

In August 1868, Bolton and his business partners Thomas Yate Lee (Note: Thomas Yate Lee (c1819–1872) also a barrister and magistrate; the Lees and Boltons were distantly related.) and John Francis Lee, trading as Lee and Bolton, were declared bankrupt. The iron works taken over, under the same business name, by H. O. Firmstone of Crookhay Ironworks, West Bromwich, by whom Bolton was employed as works manager. In around 1878, the business again collapsed, (Note: The iron works were used intermittently until 1883. When they were demolished, in 1888, the local press wrote: The glory of the Hyde has departed... It is needless to say that the closing of the works has seriously affected Kinver, which, instead of being the animated and thriving place it once was, has relapsed into a semisomnolent state, from which it will take a good deal of rousing, if it is to regain its former position. The village seems marked down for decay.) and Bolton, having already lost his fortune and his personal property, found himself unemployed.

== Zoological career ==
In 1878, following his financial losses, Bolton set up business as the "Microscopist's and Naturalists' Studio" at 17, Ann Street (Note: Now Colmore Row.), Birmingham. A piece in The Midland Naturalist later that year said:

Mr. Thos. Bolton, Naturalist, 17, Ann Street, Birmingham, announces that for a subscription of £1 1s. per half-year, paid in advance, he will supply a tube of living specimens every week. The specimens will include all varieties of which he may obtain a sufficient supply, and will be forwarded us early as possible in twenty-six consecutive weeks, To some subscribers he has agreed to forward the twenty-six tubes during twelve months, or one per fortnight, and to others (science teachers) more rapidly as they may require them for class work or exhibition. To such subscribers he also will from time to time post any notices or sketches that he may print of the various objects he is distributing.

Some time around the turn of 1880–1881, the business moved nearby, to 57, Newhall Street, Birmingham. A note in The Northern Microscopist described his premises thus:

In jars, aquaria, wine glasses, bottles, &c., at 57, Newhall, Birmingham, may be found Lophopus crystallinus, Cristatella mucedo, Plumatella repens, Stephanocerus Eichhornii, and many others, ready to be sent away at a moment's notice.

As well as amateur naturalists, he supplied schools, colleges and museums. Thanks to an efficient postal service he was able to supply clients as far away as Paris and, later, the United States The former included Jules Pelletan, editor of the Journal de Micrographie.

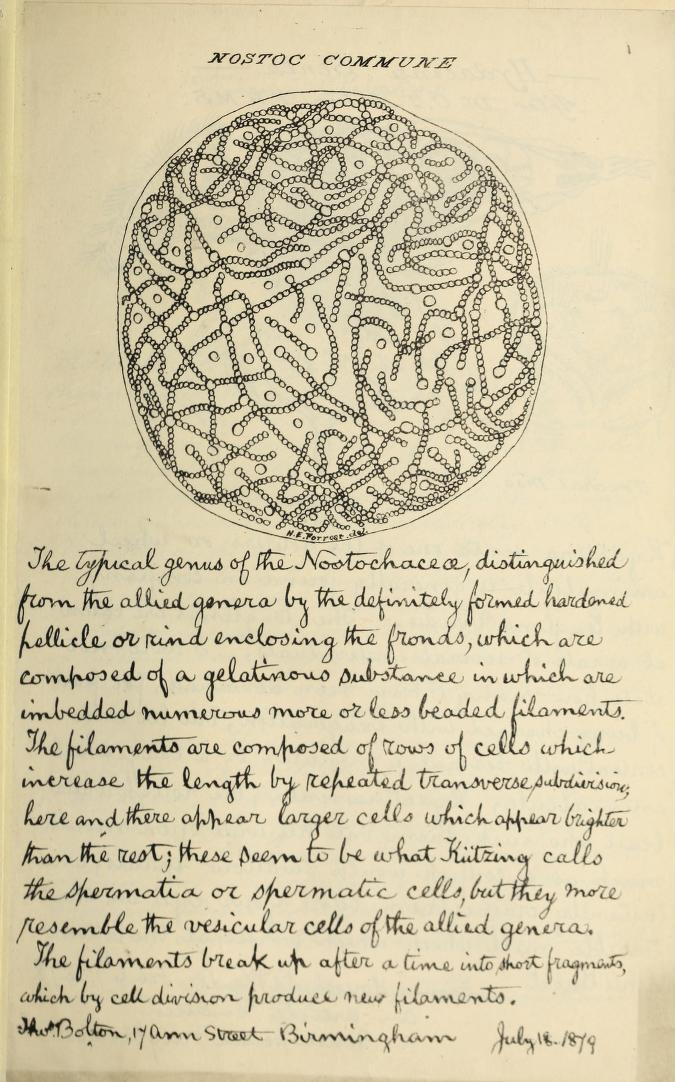
One of Bolton's autograph-printed flyleaves, about a commune of Nostocaceae (cyanobacteria), illustrated by H. Edward Forrest and written, hand-lettered and dated 18 July 1879 by Bolton

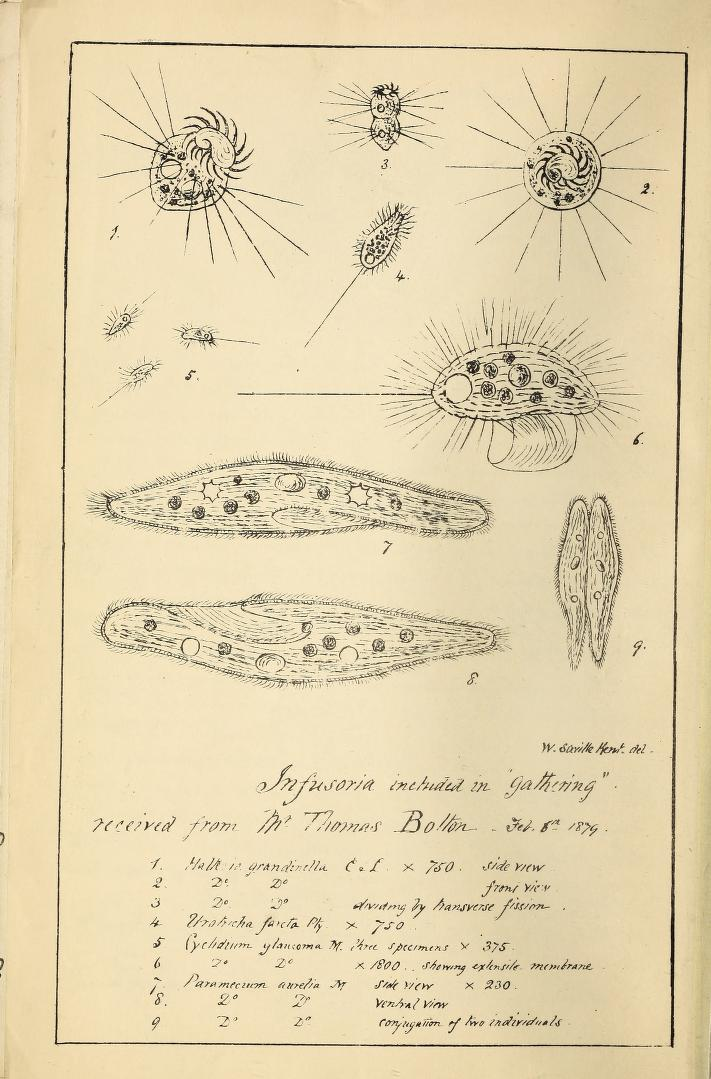
A flyleaf titled "Infusoria included in 'Gathering' received from Mr. Thos. Bolton - February 6th, 1879", drawn by William Saville-Kent

Along with the specimens, he provided a "flyleaf"—a sheet of instructions on preparing the specimens and notes on key features to observe. Some of these he wrote himself and some he extracted from published articles. They included illustrations commissioned, from 1879 to 1882, from H. Edward Forrest, or from William Saville-Kent. The flyleaves—including illustrations and hand-written texts—were initially reproduced using autographic printing, a process which Bolton also promoted from his business premises on behalf of its inventor, Alfred Pumphrey, a Birmingham photographer, although some of the flyleaves were also typeset and printed in a more traditional manner.

In addition to his business, Bolton corresponded with and supplied specimens to scientists including Francis Alfred Bedwell, Philip Henry Gosse, Charles Thomas Hudson, Ray Lankester and Saville-Kent. In 1879 Lankester wrote a glowing recommendation of "Mr. Bolton's Agency for the Supply of Microscopic Organisms" (Note: Lankester said: The work which Mr. Bolton is doing is not, however, limited to the distribution of forms already known; he has made some important additions to the British Fauna, for which he deserves the warmest support and encouragement of zoologists.) in the Quarterly Journal of Microscopical Science, of which he was editor. Bolton replied by way of a letter in Nature, modestly refuting some of the discoveries which Lankester incorrectly attributed to him.

Bolton collected and sometimes described the type specimens of several species then thought new to science, although at least some of these have since been described as junior synonyms of already-known species. These included Floscularia mutabilis (Note: A basonym of Collotheca mutabilis (Hudson, 1885).), but his description of the species, in a self-published flyleaf, was later declared invalid and attributed, with the same name, to Hudson, who had subsequently published a more formal description (Note: Of Floscularia mutabilis, Hudson said: This swimming tube-maker was discovered by Mr. Bolton in September 1884, and named, figured, and described by him in one of his fly-leaves sent out with each specimen.).

Similarly, Hudson attributed Conochilus dossuarius and Pompholyx sulcata to Bolton, who discovered them, but subsequent authorities have attributed them to Hudson. He also mentions "Stephanops bifurcus Bolton" (Note: Now Squatinella bifurca (Hudson 1986).), in a list of Stephanops species; and credits Bolton with the discovery (but not description or naming) of Notommata spicata and Taphrocampa saundersiae (Note: Now Encentrum saundersiae (Hudson, 1885).). Hudson further noted:

during the hundred years from 1766 to 1866 there were only three known species of Floscules, and that in the next twenty years no less than eleven very remarkable species have been added to the older three, mainly through the persistent researches of Mr. Bolton in England and Mr. [John] Hood in Scotland

Lankester named Archerina boltoni after Bolton from a specimen that the latter had collected and supplied to him (Note: Of Archerina boltoni, Lankester wrote: During the months of June and July, 1884, I received from Mr. Thomas Bolton, of Birmingham, several gatherings from ponds in his neighbourhood which contained an abundance of a minute, green-coloured, Heliozoon-like organism, to which he directed my attention. Careful study of the material forwarded to me by Mr. Bolton established the fact that the little Protozoon was hitherto undescribed... The discovery of this form is due to Mr. Bolton, to whom English naturalists are deeply indebted for constant supplies of the most interesting and important of our known freshwater micro-fauna, as well as for the discovery of such novelties as the Rhizopod, Lithamœba discus, the Chætopod, Haplobranchus œstuarinus, several new Naidinæ, and not a few Rotifera... as a specific name I associate with this interesting form that of its discoverer. It will thus stand as Archerina Boltoni.).

In 1878, Bolton wrote that a specimen he had collected was a new species, and had been named Chætospira cylindrica by Saville-Kent, but in 1885 Saville-Kent stated that the name was provisional, and the species had already been named Stichotricha remex by Hudson.

Furcularia boltoni, whose type specimen Bolton collected, was named in his honour by Gosse, who wrote:

...I venture to pronounce it new; and honour it with the name of that energetic microscopist, Mr. Thomas Bolton, who sent it to me.

but it was later found to be an "unavailable name" as the type specimen was not deposited in a known collection.

Edward Collins Bousfield credited Bolton (Note: Describing Dero mulleri, Bousfield wrote: My thanks are due to Mr. T. Bolton, whose kindness in supplying me with specimens has resulted in the discovery of one new species which has not yet been found elsewhere.) with finding the type specimen of Dero mulleri (Note: A junior synonym of Dero digitata.).

Saville-Kent named Salpingoeca boltoni (Note: In his formal description of Salpingoeca boltoni, Saville-Kent wrote: Its discovery is due to Mr. Thomas Bolton, who having detected it attached to Myriophyllum from his aquaria, failed to identify it precisely with any of the species figured in Plates II. to X. of this treatise, and remitted examples to the author) and Folliculina boltoni (Note: Naming Folliculina boltoni, Saville-Kent wrote: This species is named after its first discoverer, Mr. Thomas Bolton, to whom the author is indebted for the opportunity of examining examples of this and many other interesting infusorial forms described in this volume.) in his "A Manual of the Infusoria" (1880–1882), the preface of which thanks Bolton for supplying specimens.

Bolton served for several years as a secretary to the Dudley and Midland Geological and Scientific Society, and was active in the Birmingham Natural History and Microscopical Society, holding the post of curator from 1884. During the ten-week-long 1886 British Association exhibition at Bingley Hall in Birmingham, he served as the permanent attendant in the natural history annexe.

He wrote for a number of publications, including The Midland Naturalist and The English Mechanic and World of Science. A series of articles from the latter was reprinted as a pamphlet, "Hints on the Preservation of Living Objects and Their Examination Under the Microscope" (1879) (Note: A copy of the pamphlet, bound with a selection of his autograph-printed flyleaves, is held by the Thomas Fisher Rare Book Library at the University of Toronto.).

He was elected as a Fellow of the Royal Microscopical Society (FRMS) in 1878. His exhibit at the 1883 International Fisheries Exhibition earned him a gold medal.

In 1886, at the instigation of William R. Hughes and T. Grosvenor Lee (son of Thomas Yate Lee), who petitioned the government, Bolton was awarded a civil list pension of £50 per year (Note: equivalent to £5,619 in 2025), in recognition of his contributions to science. Among those who signed the petition were sixteen Fellows of the Royal Society (one also an MP), a further twelve professors, and the mayors of Birmingham and Sutton Coldfield (Note: Signatories included John William Dawson, F.R.S. (chair of the British Association), Professor Michael Foster (secretary of the Royal Society), John Lubbock, MP, F.R.S., William Carruthers, F.R.S., Ray Lankester, F.R.S., Henry Nottidge Moseley, F.R.S., Arthur Milnes Marshall, F.R.S., George Allman, F.R.S., William Dallinger, F.R.S. (president of the Royal Microscopical Society), Philip Lutley Sclater F.R.S., Professors James Sawyer (Professor of Medicine at Queen's College), William A. Tilden, Thomas William Bridge, William Hillhouse, and John Berry Haycraft (the latter three from Mason College), Thomas Martineau, (Mayor of Birmingham), Robert William Chase, Patrick Geddes, and W. Percy Sladen.).

== Death and legacy ==
In the 1881 census, Bolton's residential address was given as 108 Hall Road, Handsworth, Staffordshire. (Note: Handsworth became part of Birmingham in 1930.)

Bolton died on 7 November 1887 at Sampson Road, Birmingham, aged 56. His funeral took place at St. Peter's Church, Kinver, on 11 November, with his coffin born by his former iron works employees. He was interred in his family's vault. A five-page obituary was published in The Midland Naturalist, with another in the Birmingham Daily Post. His wife survived him.

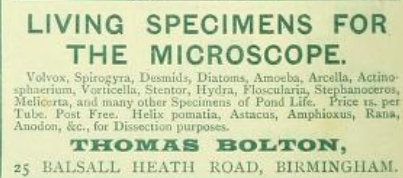
Advertisement by Bolton's son in Science Gossip (1894)

The microscopy business was carried on by the eldest of Bolton's sons, Thomas Edward Bolton (also FRMS), (to whom Bolton bequeathed all his equipment and books) working from 83, Camden Street, and boasting in an 1889 advertisement of the fisheries exhibition gold medal, and eventually from premises at 25, Balsall Health Road, in the Edgbaston district of Birmingham. Advertisements using the latter address appeared in Nature until at least as late as 30 April 1908.
