= Autographic printing =

Autographic printing may refer to:

- A process, centred on the electric pen, covered by US patent 180,857, issued to Thomas Edison in 1876, covering the pen, the duplication press, and accessories.
- Autographic printing (Pumphrey), a process developed by the Pumphrey brothers of Birmingham, England, at around the same time.
