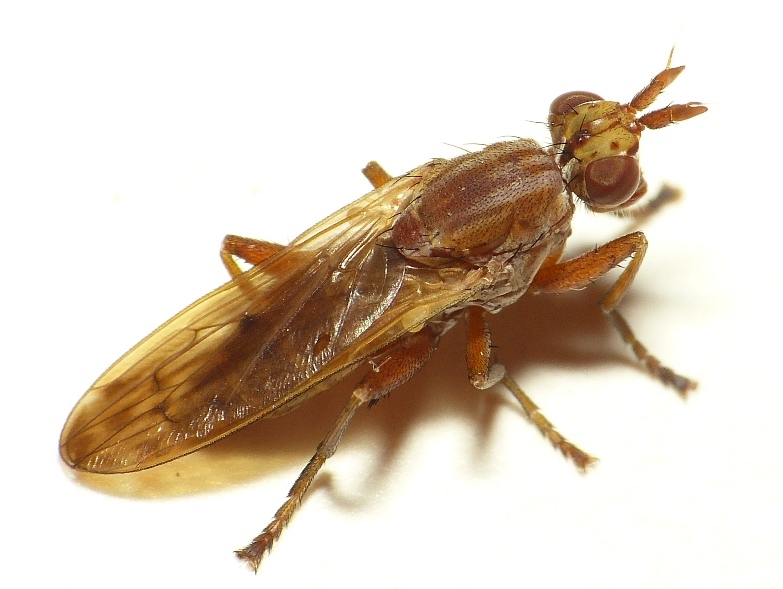
- Elgiva solicita Netherlands

Scientific classification
- Kingdom: Animalia
- Phylum: Arthropoda
- Clade: Pancrustacea
- Class: Insecta
- Order: Diptera
- Family: Sciomyzidae
- Genus: Elgiva
- Species: E. solicita

Binomial name
- Elgiva solicita (Harris, 1780)

Synonyms
- Elgiva sundewalli Kloet & Hincks, 1945; Tetanocera lineata Day, 1881; Musca rufa Panzer, 1798

= Elgiva solicita =

Species of fly

Elgiva solicita is a species of fly in the family Sciomyzidae. It is found in the Palearctic

The head is reddish; the frontal median band with two small brown spots at the insertion of the orbital bristles and a larger spot on the genes near the antenna base. The face is yellowish-white. The antennae are rufous, burnished or blackened at the apex; third article a little longer than the second. The arista is whitish at the apex. The proboscis is brown the palps yellow. The mesonotum is rufous with two grey longitudinal bands, pleurae with pale pruinosity, mesopleura ciliated or not and without an erect macrochaete. The legs are yellow: tarsi darker. The lower surfaces of the front femora are equipped with strong anteroventral and posteroventral apical setae. Wings are vitreous or somewhat yellowish. Yellow halteres. The abdomen is rufous, with a dorsal median brown line more or less enlarged. For terms see Morphology of Diptera. Long.; 6.5–8 mm.

Elgiva solicita is known from Spain, Ireland, Great Britain, France, Belgium, the Netherlands, Norway, Sweden, Finland, Denmark, Germany, Switzerland, Austria, Italy, Poland, the Czech Republic, Slovakia, Hungary, Estonia, Latvia, Lithuania, Russia, Ukraine, Romania, Bosnia and Herzegovina, Greece, North Africa and the Eastern Palearctic.

Content in this edit is translated from the existing Polish Wikipedia article at pl:Elgiva solicita; see its history for attribution
