= Autographic printing (Pumphrey) =

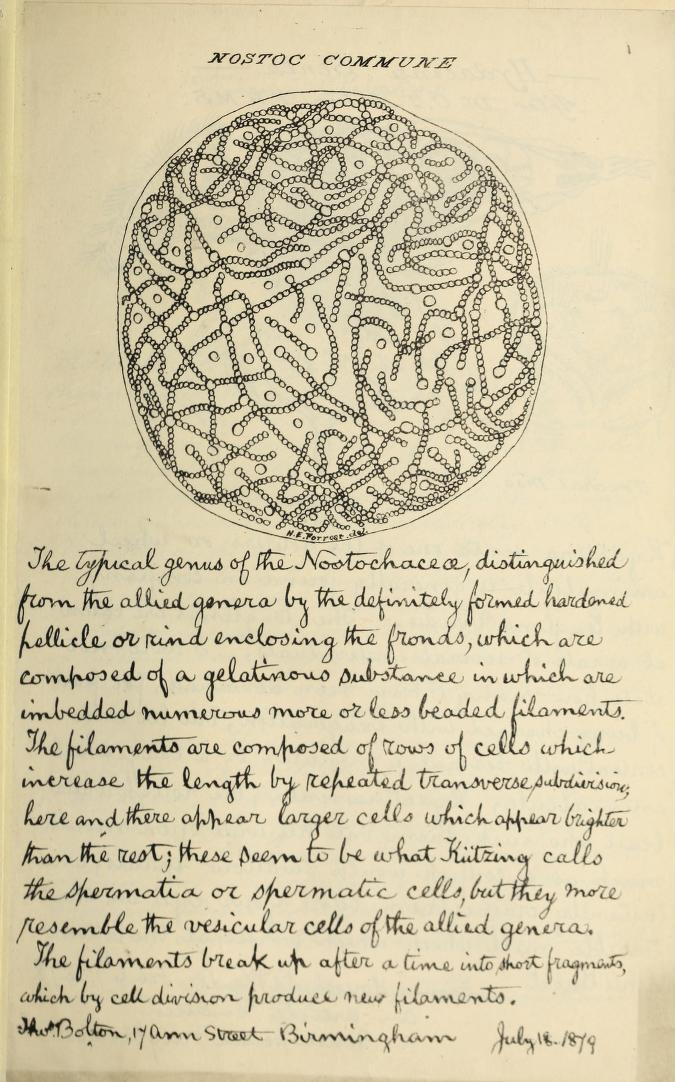
One of Thomas Bolton's autograph-printed flyleaves, about a commune of Nostocaceae (cyanobacteria), illustrated by H. Edward Forrest and written, hand-lettered and dated 18 July 1879 by Bolton

Autographic printing is a duplicating process for text and monochrome drawings, developed and patented by Alfred Pumphrey (1830–1913), a photographer from Birmingham, England, which became popular in around 1878.

One of its earliest advocates was the naturalist and microscopist Thomas Bolton, who not only used it in his publications, but sold the necessary equipment, and an instruction booklet, from his business premises in Ann Street (now Colmore Row), in central Birmingham.

A model demonstrating the process is held by the National Museum of American History in Washington DC. It was used in securing US patent 200759, granted to Pumphrey's brother Josiah Pumphrey (1823–1911), also of Birmingham, on 26 February 1878.

== Method ==
The process required the original to be made using an ink rich in iron, on paper.

In an article in The Midland Naturalist, William Bywater Grove described a demonstration by Alfred Pumphrey on 2 April 1878, to a meeting of the Birmingham Natural History and Microscopical Society:

a prepared slab of slate, coated with a special preparation of gelatine, (which can be kept ready for use for an indefinite length of time,) was moistened with a solution of bichromate of potash, the drawing to be copied was placed in contact with the surface for a few seconds, and the ink on the paper, where it touched the gelatine, affected it and made it horny. Without any further operation, an ordinary inking roller was passed over the gelatine, the ink adhering to the slab only where the writing had touched. Clean paper was then laid upon it, and a little pressure produced a perfect copy. After one print was taken, the slab was moistened with clean water, and the operation repeated

Eight plates produced in this manner were included in the same issue.
