= Lake Harrison =

Prehistoric lake that may have covered part of England

- Lake Bosworth
- Location within England Midlands Location within England
- Interactive map of Lake Harrison
- 52.5°N 1.5°W
- Type: Dry Proglacial lake
- Periods: Pleistocene
- Location: The Midlands
- Region: England

History
- Event: Ice Age

Site notes
- Archaeologists: W. Jerome Harrison

Lake Harrison or Lake Bosworth is the name given to a lake that in parts of the Last Glacial Period may have covered much of the Midlands in England around Warwick, Birmingham and Leicester. It is suggested that it was formed when ice sheets over Wales and Northern England blocked drainage north-eastwards, trapping a lake between this and the Cotswolds. Finally the lake made two overflow courses, until drainage by the Cole and Soar could resume due to glacial retreat:

- South-east. Across the Fenny Compton Gap into the Cherwell which drains into the Thames. This has become a wind gap.
- South-west. This course became lasting for the south-west zone of where the lake was, as the River Avon, Warwickshire which flows into the Severn. See also stream capture.

The extent of this proposed lake has been disputed, and it is now thought that several smaller proglacial lakes may explain the glacial deposits in the area.

== History ==
The existence of such a lake was originally proposed by W. Jerome Harrison, a pioneer of Midland glaciology, whose 1898 paper recognized the importance of the convergence of great glaciers from the north-west and north-east upon the central counties of England, and postulated that they had ponded up a lake in Leicestershire. Harrison named it Lake Bosworth, since Bosworth Field stands on a part of the glacial lake basin.

F. W. Shotton argued in 1953 that a specific place name was inappropriate for such a postulated large area of water, and proposed the name Lake Harrison. He acknowledged that other similar lakes were named after rather better-known geologists such as Lake Agassiz and Lake Lapworth. For a time the lake's existence was unquestioned, but more recent studies following the British Geological Survey's mapping of the Warwick area breathed "a refreshing air of controversy into the topic." According to Doug Harwood, "A significantly smaller proportion of the Wolstonian sequence is now regarded as lacustrine or deltaic in origin." Shotton found it impossible to agree with this alternative view and in 1983 fought a "spirited rear guard action" in defence of his original interpretation.

Jonathan Radley stated in 2009: "Accordingly, Shotton’s concept of a single widespread lake has been superseded by a new model involving diachronous development of transient lakes and ponds, associated with ice sheets advancing from the north and east."

Furthermore, Della and Julian Murton consider that the Bosworth Clays and Silts, also known as the Lower Wolston Clay (part of the Wolstonian which Shotton himself defined) are well defined enough to allow a reversion to its original name, Lake Bosworth.
