= William Gabriel Blatch =

William Gabriel Blatch FRES
- Born: 1840; London, England
- Died: 25 February 1900; Knowle, West Midlands, England
- Scientific career
- Fields: Entomology
- Institutions: Middlefield Hospital

William Gabriel Blatch FRES (1840-25 February 1900) was a British entomologist and superintendent.

== Biography ==
Blatch was born in London in 1840. He was initially apprenticed as a cobbler before working as a teacher in Colchester. He first worked as a superintendent of the Essex House asylum before moving, in 1867, to the Midland Counties Idiot Asylum (latterly known as Middlefield Hospital) where he worked until his death in 1900.

Blatch was an early member of the Birmingham Natural History and Philosophical Society and served as its secretary from 1871 to 1873. He subsequently co-founded the Birmingham Entomological Society and served as its president from 1889-1893. He was also instrumental in the establishment of the Midland Union of Natural History Societies.

Blatch's entomological collection was split after his death. Large portions of it are extant in the collections of the Manchester Museum, Birmingham Museum, and Yorkshire Museum. Small numbers are also present in the collections of Doncaster Museum and Bolton Museum. At least some of Blatch's collection ended up in the possession of his friend and fellow entomologist Herbert Willoughby Ellis.

He described the species Neuraphes planifrons and Rhizophagus oblongocollis whose type specimens are now in Manchester Museum.

In 1890 he was elected as a Fellow of the Entomological Society of London.

== Select publications ==
- BLATCH WG. 1879. "Entomological rambles in the Midlands. No 1 Bewdley Forest". The Midland Naturalist 2:193-196
