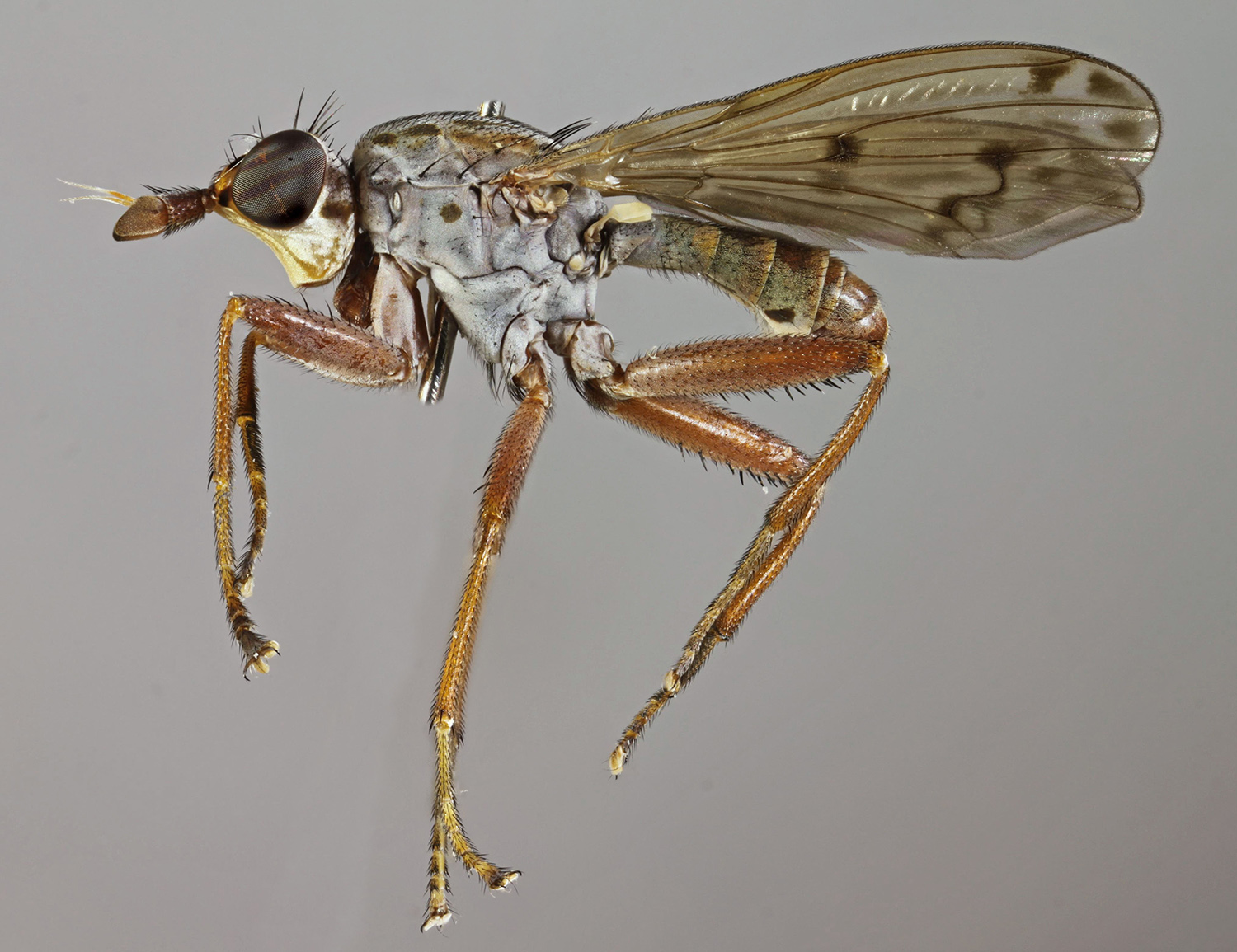
- Elgiva cucularia

Scientific classification
- Domain: Eukaryota
- Kingdom: Animalia
- Phylum: Arthropoda
- Class: Insecta
- Order: Diptera
- Family: Sciomyzidae
- Tribe: Tetanocerini
- Genus: Elgiva; Meigen, 1838

= Elgiva (fly) =

Genus of flies

Elgiva is a genus of marsh flies in the family Sciomyzidae. There are about eight described species in Elgiva.

== Species ==
- E. connexa (Steyskal, 1954)
- E. cucularia (Linnaeus, 1767)
- E. divisa (Loew, 1845)
- E. elegans Orth & Knutson, 1987
- E. manchurica Rozkosny & Knutson, 1991
- E. pacnowesa Orth & Knutson, 1987
- E. rufina (Hendel, 1931)
- E. solicita (Harris, 1780)
