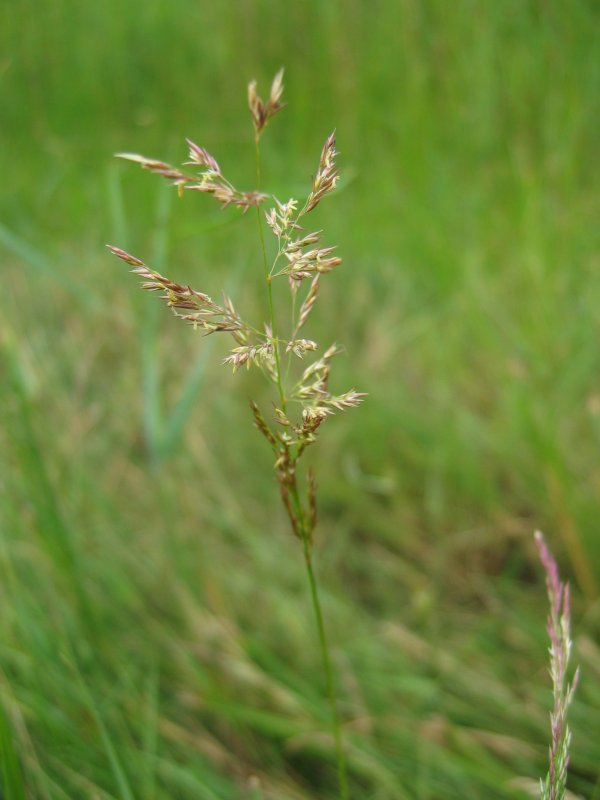

Scientific classification
- Kingdom: Plantae
- Clade: Tracheophytes
- Clade: Angiosperms
- Clade: Monocots
- Clade: Commelinids
- Order: Poales
- Family: Poaceae
- Subfamily: Pooideae
- Genus: Puccinellia
- Species: P. distans

Binomial name
- Puccinellia distans (Jacq.) Parl.

Synonyms
- Puccinellia pulvinata (Fr.) V.I.Krecz.

= Puccinellia distans =

Species of grass

Puccinellia distans is a species of grass known by the common names weeping alkaligrass and European alkali grass. It is native to Europe and it is present in most of North America, where it is perhaps an introduced species. It grows in moist habitat, usually in areas with saline soils, such as the edges of salted roads. It is a perennial herb producing hollow stems up to 40 to 60 centimeters in maximum height. The inflorescence is a spreading array of branches, the lower ones reflexed. The branches bear several rough-haired spikelets containing flowers.

== Publications ==
- Dony, C. M. (1979) Puccinellia distans (reflexed saltmarsh-grass) in Bedfordshire. Bedfordshire Naturalist 33 68–69.
