= Herbert Willoughby Ellis =

British entomologist

Herbert Willoughby Ellis FRES FGS (28 June 1869-15 October 1943) was a British entomologist.

== Biography ==
Ellis was born in Woodville, Burton-upon-Trent. He attended Nuneaton School and Coppers Hill College before training as an electrician.

In 1890 he joined the Birmingham Natural History and Philosophical Society. He served as a Vice-President of the society in 1907 and then from 1910 to 1939, and as its President in 1908 and 1909. Ellis was elected as a Fellow of the Royal Entomological Society in 1900 and he served on its council in 1924, 1931, 1936, and 1938. He was also a member of the British Ornithologists' Union and a Fellow of the Geological Society of London.

Ellis was an avid collector of entomology, especially of coleoptera and amassed a large reference collection. He was responsible for finding and recording the discovery of Arhopalus ferus (then as "Criocephalus polonicus") as new to Britain. He also corresponded and exchanged specimens with William Gabriel Blatch, acquiring some of Blatch's collection after his death.

After his death, Reginald Wagstaffe and Walter Douglas Hincks (both naturalists) were instrumental in purchasing part of his collection for the Yorkshire Museum. Over 100,000 specimens were purchased in 1945.

== Select publications ==
- 1901. "Bagous cylindricus, Payk., in Bedfordshire", Entomologist's Record and Journal of Variation 8, 140.
- 1903. "Coleoptera in the Isle of Wight", Entomologist's Record and Journal of Variation 15, 130-131.
- 1903. Criocephalus polonicus (Molsch.): A Genus and species of Longhorn Coleopteran new to Britain, Entomologist's Record and Journal of Variation 15, 259-260.
- 1904. "Coleoptera", in The Victoria History of the Counties of England - A History of Warwickshire" I, 77-124.
- 1913. "Insects", in British Association for the Advancement of Science: A Handbook for Birmingham and the Neighbourhood, 502-528.
