= Lawson Tait =

Scottish surgeon (1845–1899)

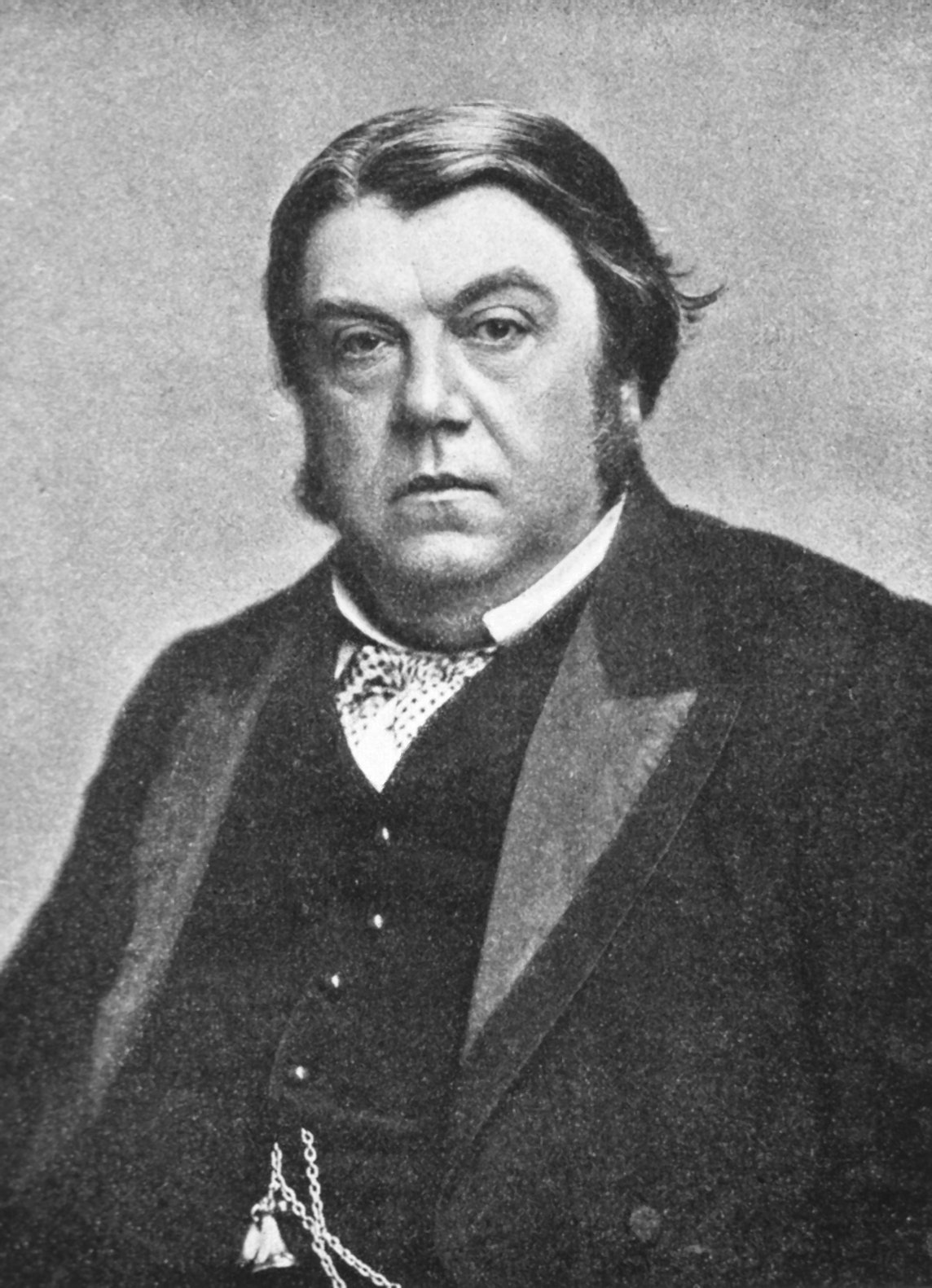
- Lawson Tait
- Born: Robert Lawson Tait; 1 May 1845; Edinburgh, Scotland
- Died: 13 June 1899 (aged 54); Llandudno, Wales
- Known for: salpingectomy, appendectomy, ovariotomy, cholecystotomy, asepsis, Medical Defence Union
- Scientific career
- Fields: Surgery, Gynaecology, Obstetrics
- Workplaces: Birmingham Women's Hospital University of Birmingham Medical School

Lawson Tait, born Robert Lawson Tait (1 May 1845 – 13 June 1899) was a Scottish pioneer in pelvic and abdominal surgery who developed new techniques and procedures. He emphasized asepsis and introduced and advocated for surgical techniques that significantly reduced mortality. He is well known for introducing salpingectomy in 1883 as the treatment for ectopic pregnancy, a procedure that has saved countless lives since then. Tait and J. Marion Sims are considered the fathers of gynecology.

== Early life and education ==
Tait was born in Edinburgh, the son of Isabella Stewart Lawson, of Leven, Fife and Archibald Campbell Tait, a lawyer, (not to be confused with his cousin of the same name who was Archbishop of Canterbury). He attended primary school at an independent school called Heriot's Hospital, where he showed exceptional promise. In 1860, the 15-year-old Tait won a scholarship and attended the University of Edinburgh as a student of Arts. He subsequently changed course to study medicine. Among his greatest influences was James Syme, the University's Chair of Clinical Surgery. Tait considered Syme to be a remarkable surgeon who emphasized care and cleanliness, and he particularly admired Syme's taste for controversy. One of Syme's closest students was Joseph Lister, with whom Tait would later have significant disputes over the rival practices of Antisepsis and Asepsis. Another influence from student days was Professor (later Sir) James Young Simpson who became a powerful supporter throughout Tait's life and Tait supported many of Simpson's causes throughout his lifetime. In 1862 Tait transferred to the Extramural School of Medicine and qualified in 1866 with the joint diploma of LRCPE, LRCSEd . licentiates granted by the two Edinburgh medical colleges. Like many students of his generation he did not sit for a Bachelor of Medicine degree.

== Career and work ==
=== Early work ===
Tait worked as a resident surgeon at the Clayton Hospital in Wakefield as a resident surgeon from 1866 until 1870, when he took over a private practice in Birmingham. He became an active member of the British Medical Association, and in this position became known as an "offensive and invidious" medical doctor. Members of the group saw him as antagonistic and overstepping his place. Despite this opposition, Tait desired acceptance in London. As such, he attended meetings in London societies and pursued a fellowship at the Obstetrical Society of London.

From around this time until 1879 he also took a job at the Birmingham and Midland Institute as a physiology and biology lecturer. In addition, Tait devoted significant efforts towards supporting Arthur Chamberlain, who was working on developing a hospital exclusively for women. Chamberlain and Tait were successful, and Tait worked as a member of staff at the Birmingham Women's Hospital until 1893, when he resigned.

=== Vivisection ===
Tait was a strong and outspoken opponent of vivisection, the practice of surgery on animals for the sake of instruction and practice. He argued that there were four strong arguments against this practice:

- Abstract morality: Tait argued that vivisection was a selfish act in which humans forced living animals to suffer in order for their own benefit.
- Political avenue: Tait argued that the only people outside of medical fields who supported vivisection were the rich. These proponents acted as "amateur poultry butchers" and took to maiming pheasants for fun. As such, the less wealthy saw supporting vivisection as enabling the frivolous and wasteful lifestyles of the wealthy.
- Religion: Tait considered evolution as an aspect of his religious beliefs. He claimed that, as humans share a history with lesser animals, they deserve equal rights. As such, despite their inability to speak for themselves, they should be treated with care and respect as one would treat a human being.
- Scientific inquiry: Tait argued that it remained uncertain as to whether vivisection has, on the whole, led to a decrease in suffering through the expansion of human knowledge. To Tait, any argument for vivisection should be absolutely decisive with no ambiguity, and he did not believe this was even possible.

In a letter addressed to the Medical Press and Circular he wrote:

Some day I shall have a tombstone put over me, and an inscription upon it. I want only one thing recorded on it, and that to the effect that he laboured to divert his profession from the blundering which has resulted from the performance of experiments on the sub-human groups of animal life, in the hope that they would shed light on the aberrant physiology of the human groups.

=== Asepsis ===
Tait was suspicious of the prevailing practice of antisepsis, advocated for by Joseph Lister. The two doctors agreed that it was necessary for surgeons to ensure that their hands and instruments were clean in order to reduce the risk of infection. Lister argued that surgical cleanliness could only be achieved through sterilization, which required the use of compounds like carbolic acid. Unlike Lister, Tait used nothing more than boiling water for cleaning his instruments and yet had similar results. Tait was able to achieve exceptional results in his surgery using his techniques, as they were simple, low-cost, effective, and not limited by the presence of chemicals.

== Reducing surgical mortality ==
Tait's first success came with his demonstration that ovariotomy could be done safely. While Ephraim McDowell had successfully performed the first ovariotomy in Kentucky in 1809, mortality for this operation was over 90%. In his first paper in 1872, Tait reported only 1 death out of nine cases, a major breakthrough. His techniques of use of intra-abdominal ligatures for the ovarian pedicle in favor of an extraperitoneal clamp, abdominal closure, and meticulous surgical cleanliness were novel and important for abdominal surgery. With further recognition, he was instrumental in the opening of the Birmingham Hospital for Women where he worked for 20 years.

== Surgical milestones ==
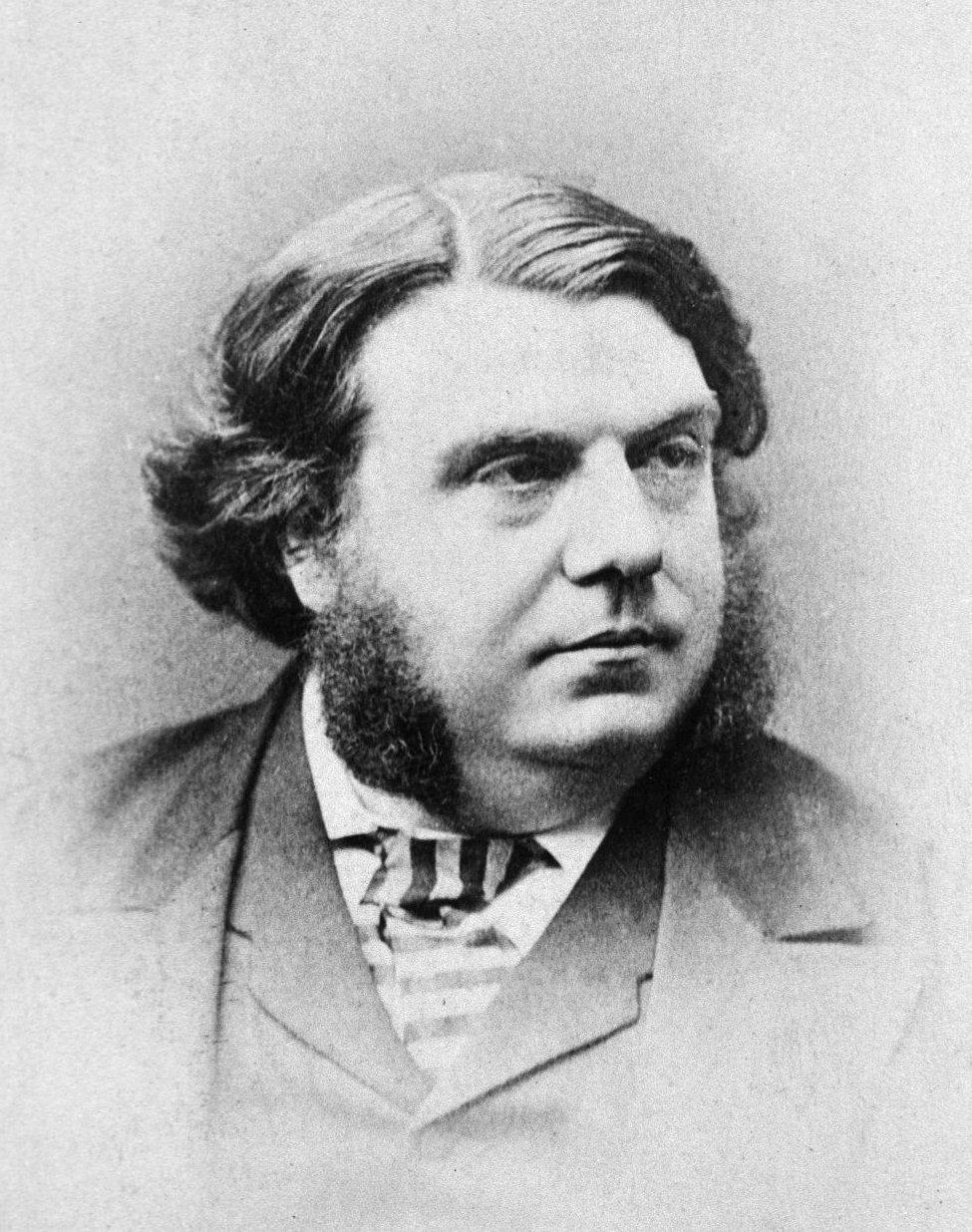
Robert Lawson Tait

During this time, his work included:

1. First removal of an organ (ovary) (oophorectomy) for pain.
2. Observation of association of cystic ovaries and excessive menstrual bleeding.
3. Surgical induction of menopause by removal of ovaries.
4. Removal of infected tubes.
5. Drainage of pelvic abscesses.
6. First appendectomy 1880. It was later learned that he was anticipated by French-born English surgeon Claudius Amyand in 1735.
7. First cholecystotomy (gallbladder surgery).
8. Asepsis in lieu of Lister's antisepsis; he avoided the use of carbolic acid.
9. Flushing of peritoneal cavity at end of operation.

== Ectopic pregnancy ==
In 1881, it was suggested to him to remove the ruptured tube in case of an ectopic pregnancy. "... the suggestion staggered me, and I am ashamed to say that I did not receive it favourably." The postmortem examination convinced him that it could be done. So, 2 years later, Tait ligated the broad ligament and tube in another patient, and this patient survived. In 1888, Tait reported only 2 deaths out of 42 operated cases, a marked improvement for a condition that had been almost always fatal.

== Other interests ==
Tait was president of the Birmingham Natural History and Microscopical Society in 1876 and around that time was instrumental in the establishment of the Midland Union of Natural History Societies. He resigned his positions on the managing bodies of both organisations in 1878, in a dispute over the latter's subscription fees.

== Later life ==
Tait's career began to decline in 1892. Due to his lifelong history of advocating for new techniques and against common practices (e.g. vivisection and antisepsis), there were many who saw him as an enemy and a nuisance. Tait's productivity slowed to a halt due to his declining health, along with two legal situations. The first of these was a lawsuit from Andrew Denholm, and the second was a threat to bring action against Tait for supposedly seducing a nurse.

In his retirement, Tait continued to stay active within medicine. Many younger doctors respected and admired him, and he regularly contributed to meetings at several Medical Institutions. He died in 1899, at the age of 54, of chronic nephritis and uremia, after a week and a half of severe illness. He remained lucid in his final days, and left instructions that his body be buried in a cave near his home. At the time of his death, several of his contemporaries published writings in praise of his medical advances, character, and work at hospitals for poor women.

== Legacy ==
The University of Birmingham has held a Lawson Tait professorship in the past.

The Lawson Tait Society, an undergraduate history of medicine society at the University of Birmingham Medical School, is named in honour of Tait. They have embarked upon a project of digitising Tait's work and resources related to Tait.

== Selected publications ==
- The Uselessness of Vivisection Upon Animals as a Method of Scientific Research (1882)
- The Pathology and Treatment of Diseases of the Ovaries (1883)
- Diseases of Women (1886)
- Last Speech on Vivisection (1889)
