= Christina Dony =

English botanist

- Born: Christina Mayne Goodman; 1910; Selly Oak, England
- Died: 23 May 1995 (aged 84–85)
- Other names: Chris Dony
- Spouse: John Dony
- Scientific career
- Fields: Botany

Christina Mayne Dony (née Goodman, 1910–1995) was an English botanist and athlete.

== Early life and family ==
Dony was born into a family of five in Selly Oak, Birmingham. She attended the Edgbaston High School for Girls and later joined the family business in construction and coal sales, where she became a director. During the Second World War, Dony worked in an aircraft factory and volunteered in Air Raid Precautions.

== Athletics ==
Dony was highly athletic in her youth, and played on England's national field hockey team five times. She played recreationally as a centre at the Edgbaston Ladies Hockey Club between 1929 and 1950 alongside her three sisters. She also played for Warwickshire County from 1939 to 1949 and for Midlands Counties between 1933 and 1948, with breaks during World War II. She was a reserve on the national team in 1935 for a European tour which included a match in Berlin against Germany on 14 April. She toured with the team in the US in 1936, and was a member again in 1946-1947 as Vice-Captain. Her interest in field hockey was passed down from her mother, and the two kept an archive of their participation in various leagues.

== Botanical work ==
In 1947, Dony joined the Birmingham Natural History Society. She later served on the council and as secretary for the Society's Botanical Section. She also became a member of the Botanical Society of the British Isles (BSBI) in 1948 and the Wild Flower Society in 1964. In the same year she took on the role of membership secretary for BSBI, a position she held for ten years. During this time, she oversaw the transfer of the steadily growing membership records and subscription service to the Society of General Microbiology at Reading. She still continued to assist with administrative tasks after retiring as secretary.

She met her husband-to-be John Dony when the pair were investigating "wool alien" plants found in areas with waste from wool mills in Worcestershire. They were married in 1962. The couple had completed botanical surveys of Hertfordshire and Bedfordshire together by 1976. She regularly gave presentations at meetings of the BSBI and Bedfordshire Natural History Society and published findings in Watsonia. At the time of her death, she had catalogued some 2532 plants. She was one of the earliest to identify the proliferous pink Petrorhagia prolifera in 1974.

== Awards and honours ==
- 1975 Honorary BSBI Member.
- 1991 Life membership of the Bedfordshire Natural History Society.

== Publications ==
- Contributor to Flora of Warwickshire (1971).
- Contributor to The Bedfordshire Plant Atlas (1976).
- Dony, C. M. (1979) Puccinellia distans (reflexed saltmarsh-grass) in Bedfordshire. Bedfordshire Naturalist 33 68–69.
- Dony, J. G. and Dony, C. M. (1986) Further notes on the flora of Bedfordshire. Watsonia 16 163–172.
- Rundle, A. J. and Dony, C. M. (1986) A provisional survey of Bedfordshire dandelions (genus Taraxacum, family Compositae). Bedfordshire Naturalist 40 65–72.
- Dony, J. G. and Dony, C. M. with editor Boon, C. R. (1991) The Wild Flowers of Luton. Luton Museum 64pp.
