= Reginald Wagstaffe =

British naturalist, ornithologist, and museum curator

- Born: 28 July 1907
- Died: 1983
- Occupations: Ornithologist; Museum curator

Academic background
- Education: University of Cincinnati

Academic work
- Institutions: Stockport Municipal Museum; Yorkshire Museum; Liverpool City Museum; British Birds Rarities Committee

Reginald Wagstaffe (28 July 1907 – 1983) was an English naturalist, ornithologist, and museum curator. He was curator of the Yorkshire Museum, and then from 1948 was the Keeper of Vertebrate Zoology at Liverpool City Museum. Wagstaffe founded the Liverpool Ornithologist's Club.

== Career ==
Wagstaffe was born in the UK on the 28th July 1907, and attended the University of Cincinnati to study ornithology. He was appointed Curator of the Yorkshire Museum in January 1941, replacing Walter Collinge, having formerly been Curator of the Stockport Municipal Museum. Wagstaffe lived with his wife, Trissie, in Manor Cottage, a building next to the Museum in the grounds of York Museum Gardens. They were living here during the Baedeker Raid on York on 29 April 1942, during which a bomb narrowly missed the Museum, but caused considerable damage to the roof and windows. Wagstaffe led the efforts to clean up the museum and salvage the Type fossils from the wreckage.

Wagstaffe worked with the Honorary Curators of Entomology, Walter Douglas Hincks and A Smith to collect specimens for the museum from Askham Bog. He also worked with Hincks to bring the Ellis collection of insects to the museum in 1945.

He left the Yorkshire Museum in 1948 to take up the post of Keeper of Vertebrate Zoology at Liverpool City Museum where he remained for the rest of his working life, founding the Liverpool Ornithologist's Club and serving as a member of the British Birds Rarities Committee from 1963 to 1970. Some specimens collected by Wagstaffe at in Te Papa national museum in New Zealand.

== Publications ==
- Wagstaffe, R. and Fidler, J. H. 1957. The preservation of natural history specimens. London.
- Wagstaffe, R. 1978. Type specimens of birds in the Merseyside County Museums : formerly City of Liverpool Museums. Liverpool.
