= James Eustace Bagnall =

English naturalist (1830–1918)

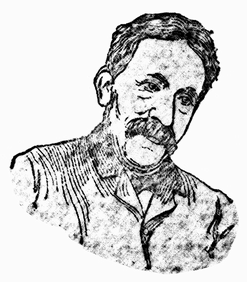
- Sketch of Bagnall from 1891
- Born: 7 November 1830; Birmingham, England
- Died: 3 September 1918 (aged 87); Birmingham, England
- Known for: Contributions to local Floras and bryology.
- Scientific career
- Fields: Natural history; Botany
- Author abbrev. (botany): Bagn.

James Eustace Bagnall ALS (7 November 1830 – 3 September 1918) was an English naturalist with a particular interest in botany, especially bryology. He was the author of the first Flora of Warwickshire (VC38) in 1891. A noted bryologist, he wrote the Handbook of Mosses in the Young Collector Series, various editions of which were published between 1886 and 1910.

== Life ==
James Eustace Bagnall was born in Birmingham on 7 November 1830. He was the eldest son of James Bagnall (1804–1874) and his wife Jane Amelia (née Wall, 1806–1888). When younger, he lived with his family in central Birmingham, being educated at Singers' Hill School; from 1881, census returns show him living with his sister Fanny in the Aston district of Birmingham. Initially he worked at his father's warehouse as a brass-founder. Between c. 1845 and 1897, he worked as a clerk at Hinks and Wells, who were Birmingham manufacturers of steel pen-nibs. He never married. He died on 3 September 1918.

== Contributions to Natural History ==
"Bagnall did not discover the delights of botany until the age of 34, when a friend lent him a microscope." He says of himself that "all my work, whether clerical or botanical, has been done in the scant leisure of a manufactory clerk" and that his "knowledge of botany has been self-acquired." Via the collection of specimens and the collation of records, his main contribution was to what is now called biogeography.

Bagnall was prominent member of the Birmingham Natural History and Microscopical Society. His herbarium and papers are held by the Library of Birmingham. The National Museum Cardiff has 125 of his bryological specimens. Other herbaria hold specimens he collected (e.g. the Fielding-Druce Herbarium (OXF)).

=== Local Floras ===
Bagnall made important contributions to the Floras of the counties surrounding his home in Birmingham. One of his earliest publications, in 1874, was a moss Flora of Warwickshire.

In 1876, he published a Flora of Sutton Park, now a National Nature Reserve. There were very few plant records from Sutton Park before this account, so that his Flora served as the foundation for all later Floras. A version with updated species names is available online.

In 1891, his Flora of Warwickshire was published. This was the first Flora of Warwickshire (VC38), and was based on a series of papers Bagnall had published in the Midland Naturalist between 1881 and 1885. Comprising 561 pages in three sections, this comprehensive work describes the topography, geology and meteorology of the county; divides it into districts based on drainage basins; lists the flora, including bryophytes, lichens and fungi, with most records broken down by district; and finishes with a detailed history of botanising in Warwickshire. The Summary chapter contains statistical analyses, which show, for example, that Warwickshire contained 100% of the species known at the time from 80 or more British counties, but only 9% of those found in fewer than 10 counties, so that it was not a notable county for rare plants.

The first attempt at a comprehensive Flora of Staffordshire (VC39) was by Robert Garner in 1844. In 1901, when Bagnall was already well known for The Flora of Warwickshire, his Flora of Staffordshire was published. This 74 page work was intended to update Garner's Flora and contains a substantial number of new records, many by Bagnall himself. It was only superseded in 1972. Bagnall also contributed the botanical chapter for the 1908 volume of the Victoria County History of Staffordshire. As with his Flora of Warwickshire, Bagnall divided the county into drainage areas and classified records by these areas.

=== Bryology ===
Bagnall was a noted field bryologist. As mentioned above, one of his earliest publications, in 1874, was a moss Flora of Warwickshire. His most widely distributed work is his Handbook of Mosses, a contribution to The Young Collector Series published in London by Swan Sonnenschein, etc. The handbook was published and reprinted in at least six editions between 1886 and 1910, and is now available online. It describes how to study mosses, including the apparatus needed and the preparation and storage of specimens; their development, habitats (including descriptions of typical species) and geographical distribution; and their classification. It also includes chapters on cultivation and use.

Bagnall contributed chapters or sections on bryophytes to a number of works, including the Victoria County History of Worcestershire in 1901, the Victoria County History of Warwickshire in 1904, the Victoria County History of Staffordshire in 1908 and The Botany of Worcestershire in 1909.

== Honours and awards ==
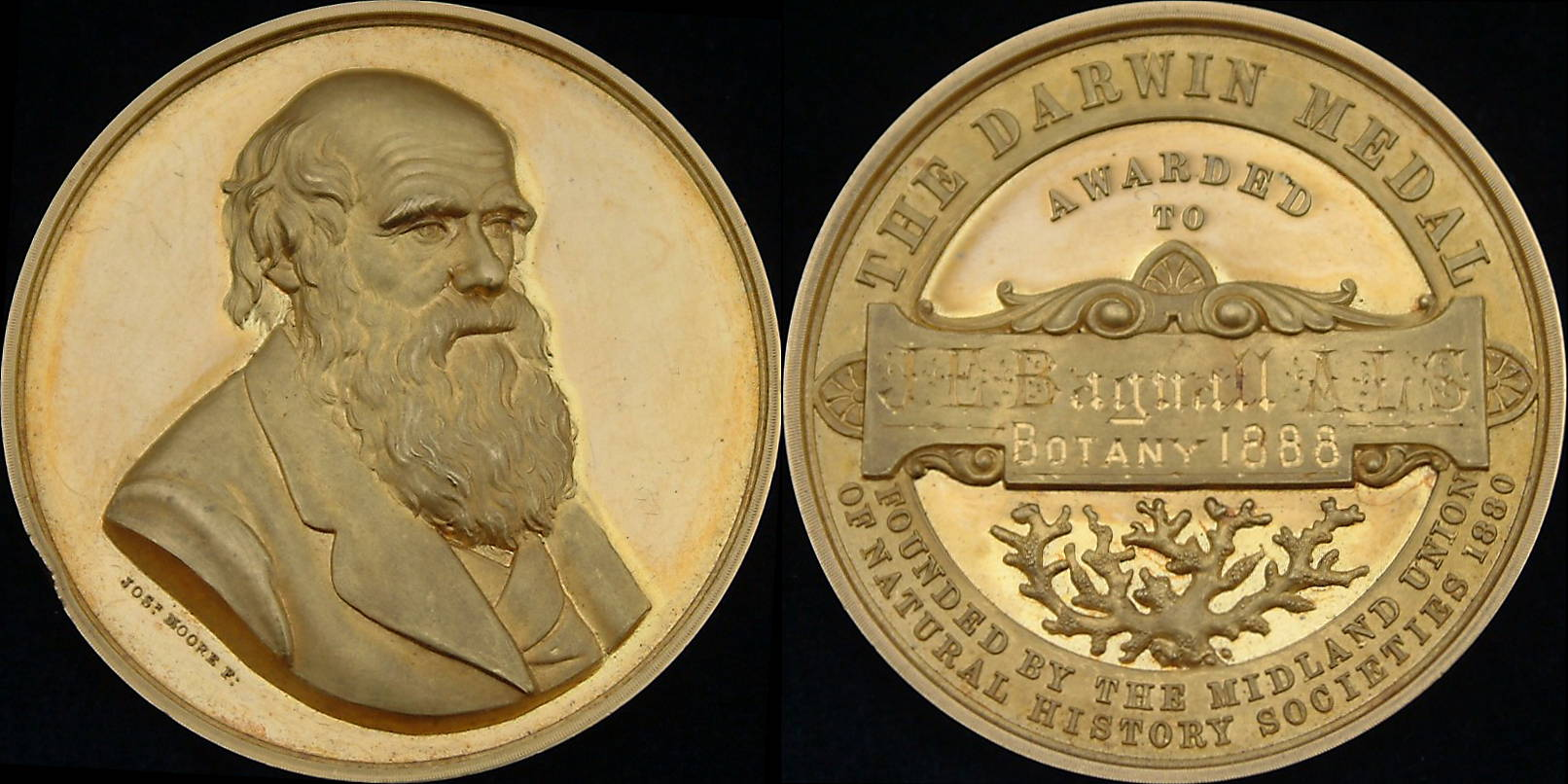
Medal forming part of the Darwin Prize

- On 15 January 1885, he was elected an Associate of the Linnean Society (ALS).
- In 1888, he was awarded the Darwin Prize of the Midland Union of Natural History Societies, with the citation "Botany". The prize (whose title and purposes had been approved by Charles Darwin) was "given annually for a paper indicating original research upon a subject within the scope of the Societies in the Union, contributed by a member for publication in the Journal of the Union," and included a medal.
- In 1909, he was elected an honorary member of the Moss Exchange Club.

== List of Bagnall's major publications ==
- Bagnall, James E. (1874), "The Moss Flora of Warwickshire", Journal of Botany (January).
- Bagnall, James E. (1876), Notes on Sutton Park: Its Flowering Plants, Ferns, and Mosses, read at a general meeting of the Birmingham Natural History and Microscopical Society, held December 6th, 1876, Birmingham, OCLC 18894820. (An updated version is available online.)
- He was a regular contributor to the Midland Naturalist, which was published between 1878 and 1893 in Vols 1-16.
- Bagnall, James E. (1886), Handbook of Mosses, The Young Collector Series, London: Swan Sonnenschein, OCLC 683252. Reprinted/republished in at least 6 editions 1889 (3rd), 1891, 1896 (4th), 1907 (5th), 1910 (6th) (London, Swan Sonnenschein).
- Bagnall, James E. (1891), "Flora of Warwickshire", Nature, 43 (1114), Gurney & Jackson: 413, Bibcode:1891Natur..43..413B, doi:10.1038/043413a0, S2CID 35724184
- Bagnall, James E. (1901), "Musci, Hepaticae, Lichenes, Algae", in ed Amphlett, J. "Botany", Victoria History of the County of Worcestershire, Vol. 1, pp. 62–69
- Bagnall, James Eustace (1901), The Flora of Staffordshire, London: West, Newman & Co., OCLC 314349594 (supplement to the Journal of Botany)
- Bagnall, James E. (1903), "Mosses and Hepatics of Worcestershire", Journal of Botany, 41: 366
- According to Lawley, Bagnall contributed a section on bryophytes in Doubleday, H. Arthur & Page, W., eds. (1904), Victoria History of the County of Warwickshire, Vol. 1, OCLC 222417743
- Adams, H. Isabel & Bagnall, James E. (1907), Wild Flowers of the British Isles, London: Heineman, doi:10.5962/bhl.title.115947, hdl:2027/chi.103261850, OCLC 27472295, S2CID 3967616. Bagnall is listed as having revised this work.
- Bagnall, James E. (1908), "Botany", in Page, W. (ed.), Victoria History of the County of Staffordshire, Vol. 1, pp. 41–60, OCLC 222578311
- Amphlett, John; Bagnall, James E. & Rea, Carleton (1909), The Botany of Worcestershire, Birmingham: Cornish Brothers, OCLC 67895586. A facsimile reproduction was published in 1978 (Wakefield : EP Pub.). Bagnall is credited by Lawley with the section on bryophytes.

== Bibliography ==
- Badger, Edward William (1897), A sketch of the botanical work of James E. Bagnall, Birmingham, OCLC 182910452
- Desmond, Ray (1977), Dictionary of British and Irish botanists and horticulturists including plant collectors and botanical artists, London: Taylor & Francis, ISBN 978-0-85066-089-0
- Edees, E.S. (1972), Flora of Staffordshire, Newton Abbott: David & Charles, ISBN 978-0-7153-5563-3
- Fowkes, H.H. & Coxhead, P. (1997), A Natural History of Sutton Park: Part 1 Vascular Plants (2nd ed.), Sutton Coldfield Natural History Society, OCLC 182901940
- Garner, Robert (1844), The Natural History of the County of Stafford, London: J. Van Voorst, hdl:2027/uc1.b3272385, OCLC 454823400
- Price, J.M. (1980), "Memories of Bagnall and his Flora", Proceedings of the Birmingham Natural History Society, 24 (2): 75–92
- Readett, R.C. (1971), "A Flora of Sutton Park", Proceedings of the Birmingham Natural History Society, 22: 1–88, also published as a separate reprint.
