= Thomas Wright (geologist) =

19th-century Scottish physician and paleontologist

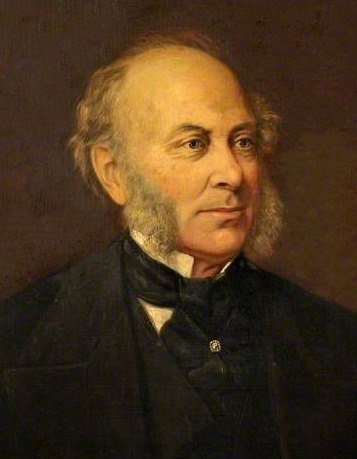
Thomas Wright

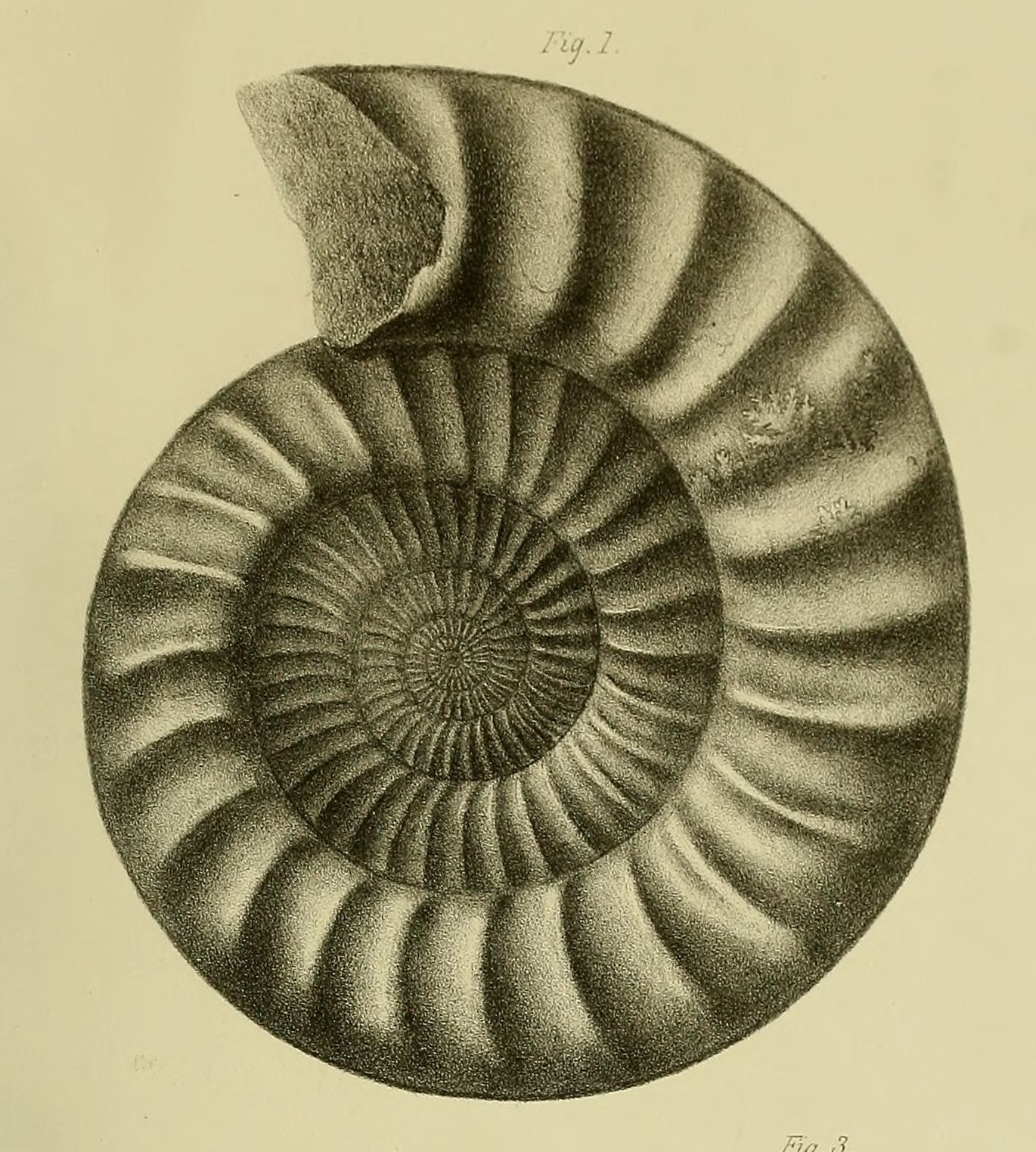
A Jurassic fossil ammonite, Arietites bucklandi, from Wright's monograph on Lias Ammonites

Dr Thomas Wright FRS FRSE FGS (9 November 1809 – 17 November 1884) was a Scottish surgeon and palaeontologist.

Wright published a number of papers on the fossils which he had collected in the Cotswolds and elsewhere, including Lias Ammonites of the British Isles, and monographs on the British fossil echinoderms of the Oolitic (Jurassic) and Cretaceous formations.

== Life ==
Wright was born in Paisley on 9 November 1809, the son of Thomas Wright and his wife, Barbara Jarvis, and was educated at Paisley Grammar School. He studied medicine at the Royal College of Surgeons in Ireland based in Dublin. He returned to Scotland to practice and received his doctorate (MD) from St Andrews University in 1846. In 1846 he moved to Cheltenham, where he became medical officer of health to the urban district, and surgeon at Cheltenham General Hospital.

In his leisure time, he took up geological pursuits, became a member of the Cotteswold Naturalists' Club, and made a collection of Jurassic fossils. In 1855 he was elected a Fellow of the Royal Society of Edinburgh, his proposer being Sir William Jardine. In 1859 he was elected a Fellow of the Geological Society in London. He won the Wollaston Medal in 1878 and became a fellow of the Royal Society in 1879.

In the early 1880s, he served as president of the Midland Union of Natural History Societies.

After his death, part of his fossil collection was sold to the British Museum.

== Family ==
He married twice: firstly around 1830 to Elizabeth May; secondly in 1845 to Mary Ricketts (died 1878), youngest daughter of Sir Robert Tristram Ricketts.

He had one son, Thomas Lawrence Wright, and two daughters, the elder of which married the geologist Edward Wethered.
