= National Photographic Record Association =

The National Photographic Record Association was established in 1897 to create a record of English life, towns and landscapes. It emerged as part of the Photographic Record and Survey Movement which sought to record a range of objects and phenomena of social and physical landscapes undergoing rapid change, and as a result of the expansion of photography as a pastime in the nineteenth century.

== Foundation ==
The National Photographic Record Association (NPRA) was first proposed in 1889 by William Jerome Harrison and presented to the Royal Photographic Society in his 1892 paper A National Photographic Record and Survey. Although the society rejected his idea, five years later, in September 1897, John Benjamin Stone adopted Harrison's ideas and established the NPRA for "a photographic survey of the three kingdoms, not forgetting the principality". The Association's aim was to create a record of historical interest for the future, forming a national memory bank in order to foster "a national pride in the historical associations of the country, or neighbourhood, in family traditions, or in personal associations."

== Work ==
During its thirteen years of operation, 5,883 prints were collected by photographers including Benjamin Stone, Edgar Scamell and many others. All contributions were made on a voluntary basis. Initially many of the prints were donated to the British Museum. Their collection has now been handed to the Victoria and Albert Museum.

== Demise ==
In May 1910, with a growing concentration of survey work at a local level, it was announced that the NPRA had done its work, and that the time had arrived when it could retire and leave the work to be carried on by local societies.

== Further Resources ==
- Photography, ‘Englishness’ and Collective Memory: The National Photographic Record Association, 1897–1910, Elizabeth Edwards in Locating Memory: Photographic Acts, Annette Kuhn Kirsten Emiko McAllister (Eds), Berghahn Books, New York, 2006 (on Google Books)
- A Record of England: Sir Benjamin Stone and the National Photographic Record Association 1897–1910, Elizabeth Edwards, Peter James & Martin Barnes, Dewi Lewis Publishing, 2006
- A Century of Survey Photography, Peter James, in The Local Historian, November 1990, Vol 20, No. 4 (available online at "Photography as Art and Social History". Adam Matthew Publications.)
