= Birmingham Natural History Society =

- Founded: 1858
- Dissolved: 2023
- Type: Learned society
- Registration no.: 500819
- Purpose: Study of natural history
- Region served: Birmingham, England
- Website: bnhsoc.org.uk

Birmingham Natural History Society was a learned society for the study of the natural history of Birmingham, England, and in the surrounding Midlands region, and beyond. It was founded in 1858, and was a registered charity. The Society has had various names, e.g. in the 1870s it was called the Birmingham Natural History and Microscopical Society, and from 1894 to 1963 the Birmingham Natural History and Philosophical Society. It was agreed that the society should be dissolved in 2022, due to lack of volunteer officers to run it.

== History ==
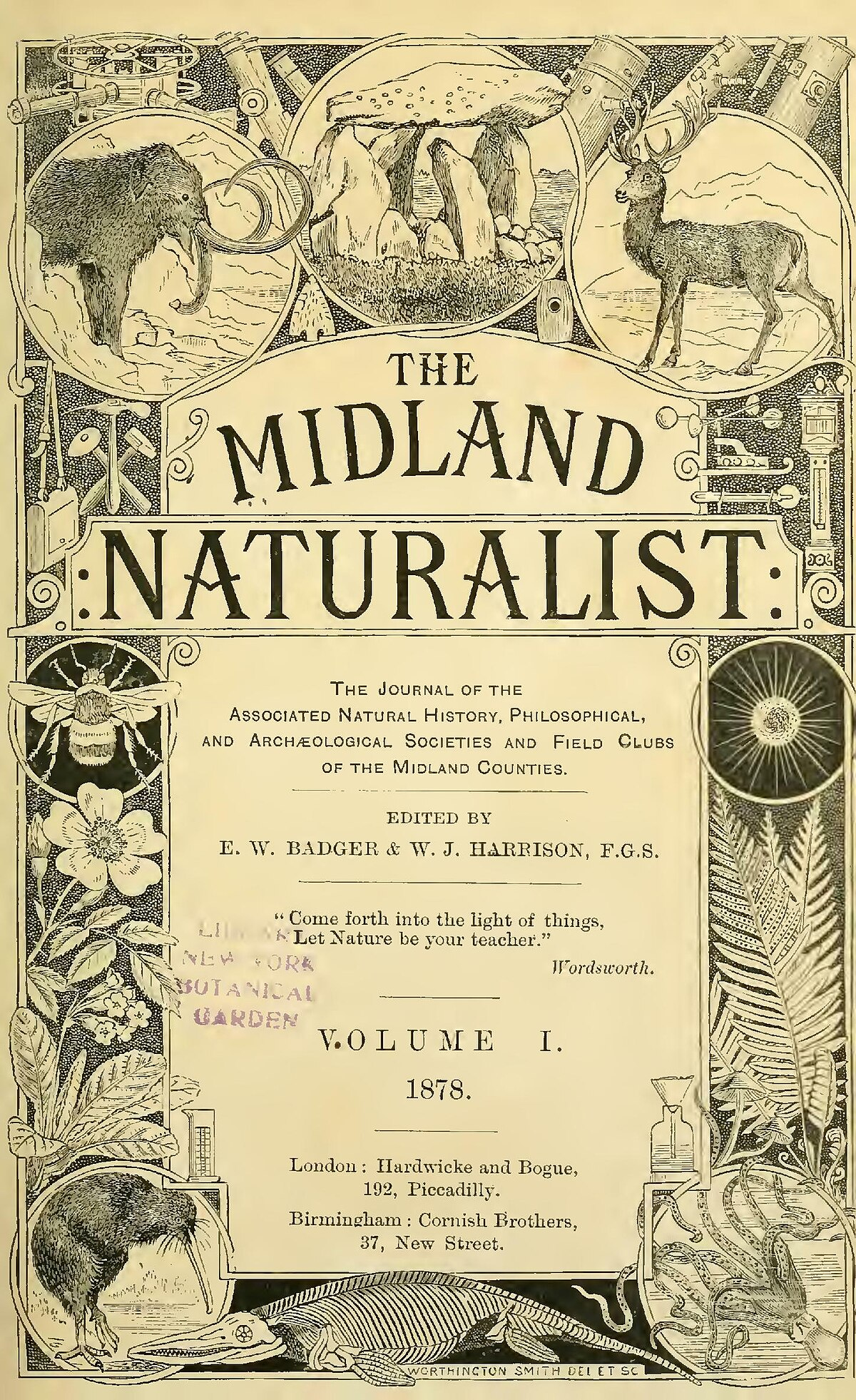
Cover of the first volume of The Midland Naturalist designed by Worthington Smith, who described the design in the first issue.

The Society was founded in 1858. For a considerable part of its early life, it was called the Birmingham Natural History and Microscopical Society. In 1877, the Society played the lead in forming the Union of Midland Natural History Societies, which published the journal The Midland Naturalist. Some of the societies in the union later merged with the Birmingham Natural History Society. The Birmingham Philosophical Society, founded in 1876, merged in 1894, when the title of the Society was changed to the Birmingham Natural History and Philosophical Society. The Midland Malacological Society and the Birmingham Entomological Society were amalgamated in 1906 and 1908 respectively. The society's activities were greatly reduced by world war one but activity had picked up again by 1920. In 1924 the society carried out an extensive survey of Hartlebury Common.

The Society rooms suffered bomb damage on October 25, 1940 and as a result the society suspended its activities for the remainder of hostilities. The society began to meet again in 1945 and restarted publication of its proceedings in 1950.

The most recent title of the Society was first used in its Proceedings in 1964.

Important early members of the society included the botanist James Eustace Bagnall (1830-1918), who produced the first Flora of Sutton Park (now a national nature reserve) and later the first Flora of Warwickshire.

From March 2020 onwards, there were no meetings because of the COVID-19 pandemic. In May 2022, an extraordinary general meeting was held, at which it was agreed to dissolve the society, and divide its financial assets between the Warwickshire Wildlife Trust and the Birmingham and Black Country Wildlife Trust.

== Activities ==
The society was responsible for the designation of Edgbaston Pool as a Site of Special Scientific Interest, and until 2012 was formally involved in its management.

The society operated a library for its members, and held regular meetings (at the Friends Meeting House in Selly Oak, field trips and training sessions. It published a journal, Proceedings of the Birmingham Natural History Society (ISSN 0144-1477). First published in 1870, the journal appeared in four parts to a volume; parts have appeared at different intervals over time, e.g. each part of Volume 15 covered two calendar years whereas each part of Volume 29 covered three. Volume 30 Part 2 was published in 2020 prior to the dissolution of the society, covering 2018–2020.

== Publications ==
Works published by the society include:

- Proceedings of the Birmingham Natural History Society (formerly Proceedings of the Birmingham Natural History and Microscopical Society, Proceedings of the Birmingham Natural History and Philosophical Society); most recently published every three years (ISSN 0144-1477)
- The Fauna of the Midland Plateau, published in three volumes between 1910 and 1913: Volume 1 Mycetozoa, by W.B. Grove; Volume 2 Preliminary list of Thysanura and Collembola, by W.E. Collinge; Volume 3 Introduction to the Fauna of the Midland Plateau, by P.E. Martineau
- A Computer Mapped Flora by D. A. Cadbury, J. G. Hawkes and R. C. Readett, 1971 – a study of the flora of Vice-County 38, Warwickshire, published in conjunction with the University of Birmingham
- A Fungus Flora of Warwickshire edited by M.C.Clark, 1980, published in conjunction with the University of Birmingham and the British Mycological Society
- Lepidoptera of the Midland (Birmingham) Plateau, published in Proceedings of the Birmingham Natural History Society 26(3-4), 1992/93

== Presidents ==
Notable past presidents of the society include:

- Samuel Allport (1868)
- Edmond W. Carlier (1910–1911, 1923, 1931–1932)
- Robert William Chase (1885-1886, 1899, 1905-1907)
- John H. Fremlin (1972–1973)
- William Bywater Grove (1888–1889)
- Jack G. Hawkes (1963–1964, 1986–1987)
- John Henry Poynting (1897–1898)
- Lawson Tait (1876)
- George Stephen West (1913)

== See also ==
- Thomas Bolton (microscopist) (1831-1887), held the post of curator
- Christina Dony (1910-1995), English botanist, served on the council and as secretary of the Botanical Section

== Bibliography ==
- Kenrick, K.L. (1958). Birmingham Natural History and Philosophical Society Centenary Celebrations : the records of the society and the story they tell. Birmingham Natural History and Philosophical Society.
