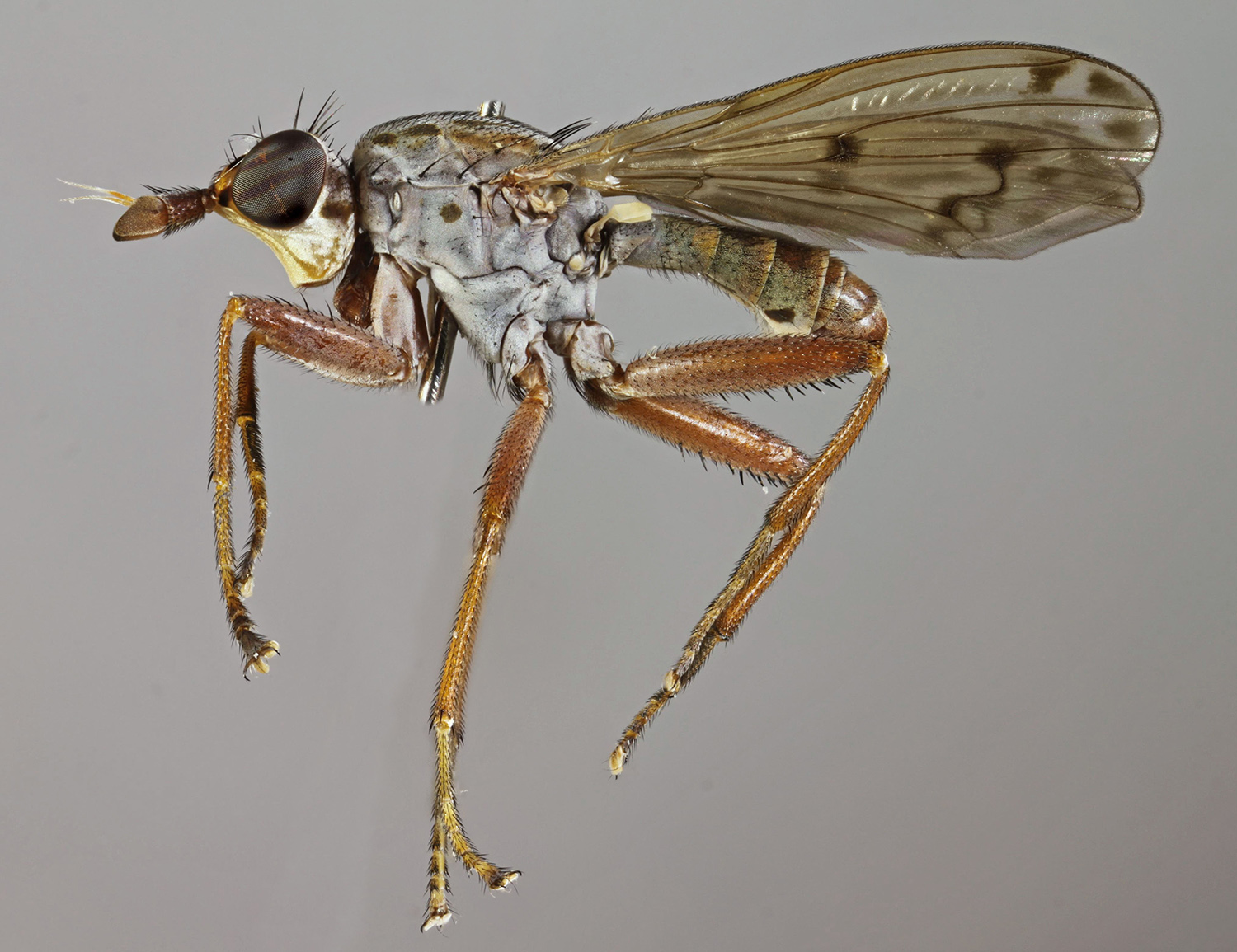
- Elgiva cucularia North Wales

Scientific classification
- Kingdom: Animalia
- Phylum: Arthropoda
- Class: Insecta
- Order: Diptera
- Family: Sciomyzidae
- Genus: Elgiva
- Species: E. cucularia

Binomial name
- Elgiva cucularia (Linnaeus, 1767)

= Elgiva cucularia =

Species of fly

Elgiva cucularia is a species of fly in the family Sciomyzidae. It is found in the Palearctic. Long. : 5–8 mm. Overall it is coloured yellowish-brown with a bluish-gray body. The head is characterized by silky black dots at the bases of the anterior orbital setae, between the bases of the antennae and the edges of the compound eyes, and in the centre of the occiput. The third antenna segment is a little shorter than the second. The mesonotum is black with a grey ground and grey pruinosity. There are longitudinal, brown stripes on the dorsum of the thorax: two narrow in the middle and two wide on the sides. One mesopleural bristle amongst short setae. The prothorax is bare. The yellowish smoky wings are 5.2 to 6.8 mm long and have fuzzy spots on the front half. The legs and abdomen are yellow. The lower surfaces of the hind femora are equipped with setae, while the front pair lacks them. The abdomen is rufous. For terms see Morphology of Diptera. Larvae of E. cucularia are predators of aquatic, pulmonate snails in the families Lymnaeidae, Physidae, and Planorbidae.

E. cucularia is a Palearctic insect, in Europe known from Portugal, Ireland, Great Britain, France, Belgium, the Netherlands, Norway, Sweden, Finland, Denmark, Germany, Switzerland, Austria, Italy, Poland, Czech Republic, Slovakia, Hungary, Greece, Estonia, Latvia, Lithuania and Russia . To the east it reaches to Siberia and Altai, and to the south to Algeria.

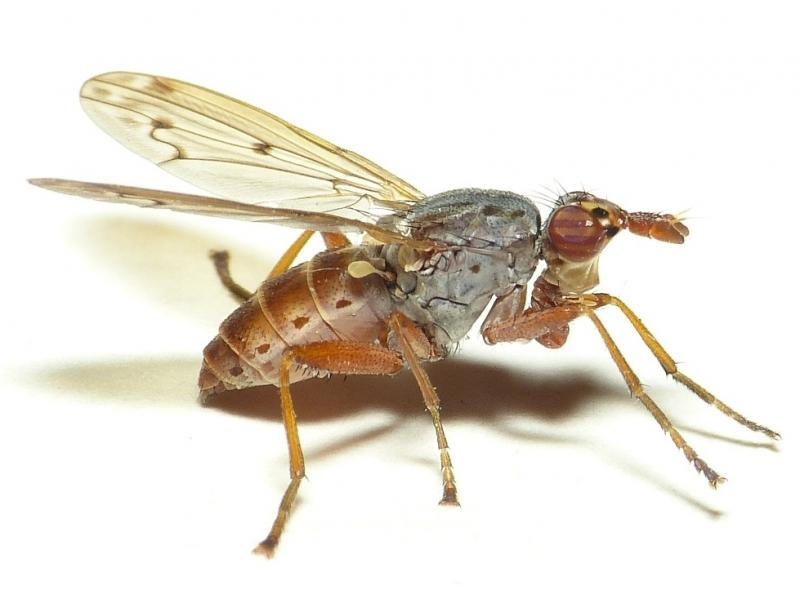
Elgiva cucularia Netherlands

Content in this edit is translated from the existing Polish Wikipedia article at pl:Elgiva cucularia; see its history for attribution
