= Robert William Chase =

British ornithologist (1852–1927)

- Born: 1852
- Died: 1927 (aged 74–75)
- Occupation: Ornithologist

Robert William Chase (1852–1927) was a British ornithologist, businessman, and philanthropist. His extensive collection of taxidermied birds is now in the care of Birmingham Museums Trust.

Chase owned a brush-making business in Birmingham. He was elected to the British Ornithologists' Union in 1882.

He was also vice-chairman of the board of governors of Birmingham Blue Coat School. He was treasurer (1892-1894 ) and president (1885-1886, 1899, 1905-1907) of the Birmingham Natural History and Philosophical Society, and in 1885 president of the Midland Union of Natural History Societies.

In 1892 his address was given as "Southfield, Priory Road, Birmingham".
