= Worthington George Smith =

British botanist (1835–1917)

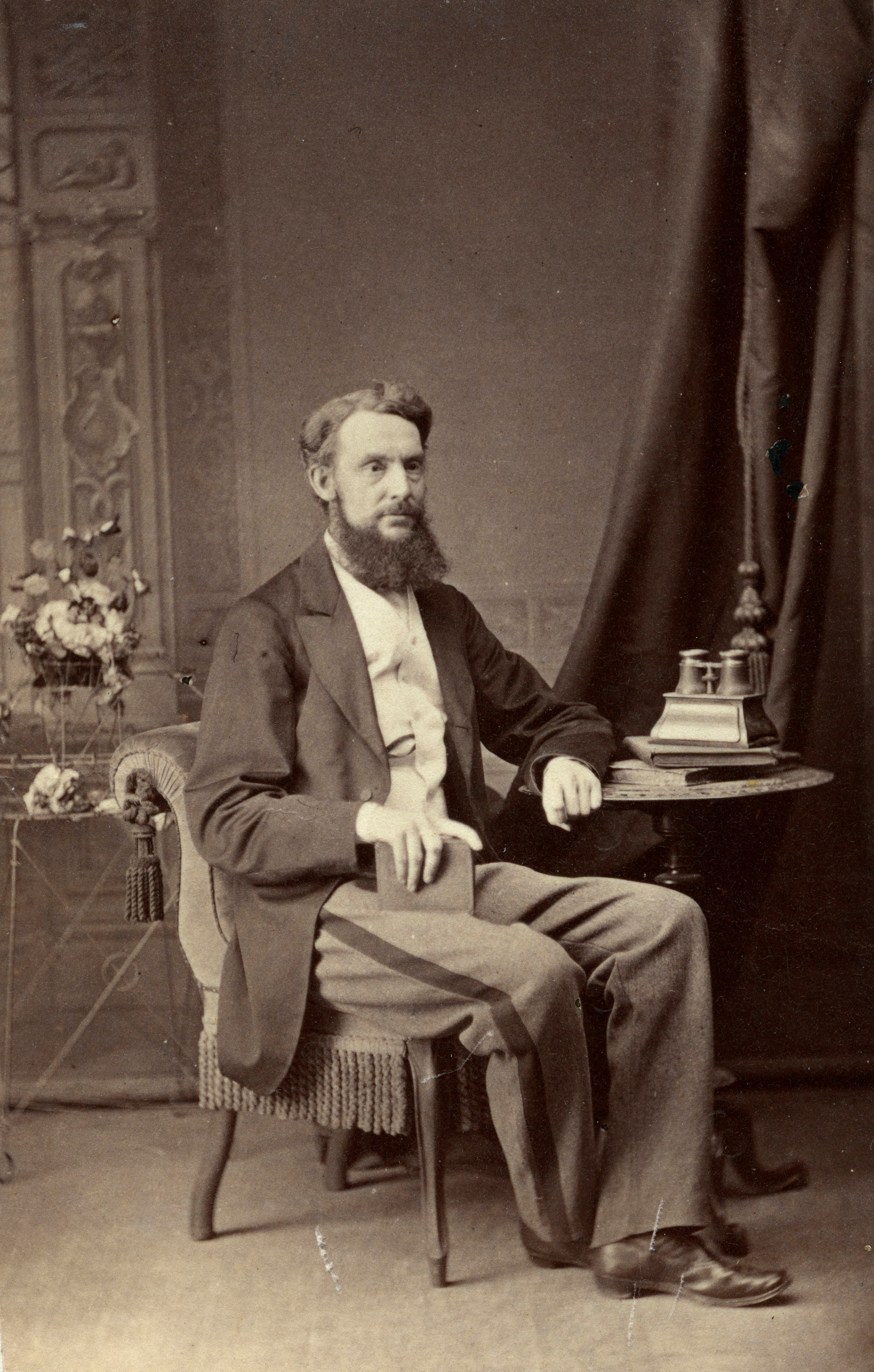
In 1870

Worthington George Smith (25 March 1835 – 27 October 1917) was an English cartoonist and illustrator, antiquarian, archaeologist, plant pathologist, and mycologist. Originally trained as an architect he moved to illustration and began to study and draw fungi, particularly those affecting crop plants. In the 1870s he took a special interest in archaeology, studying stone tools and other human remains. He also studied the history of Dunstable, serving as freeman of the Borough.

== Background and career ==
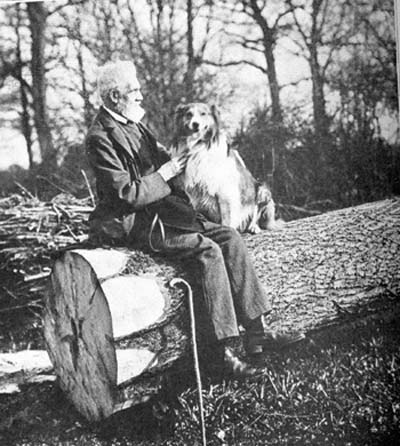

Worthington G. Smith was born in Shoreditch, London, the son of civil servant George Smith and Sarah Worthington. He received an elementary education at St. John's Parochial School Shoreditch and was then apprenticed as an architect under A. E. Johnson. He married Henrietta White in 1856 and the couple had seven children, only three of whom survived childhood.

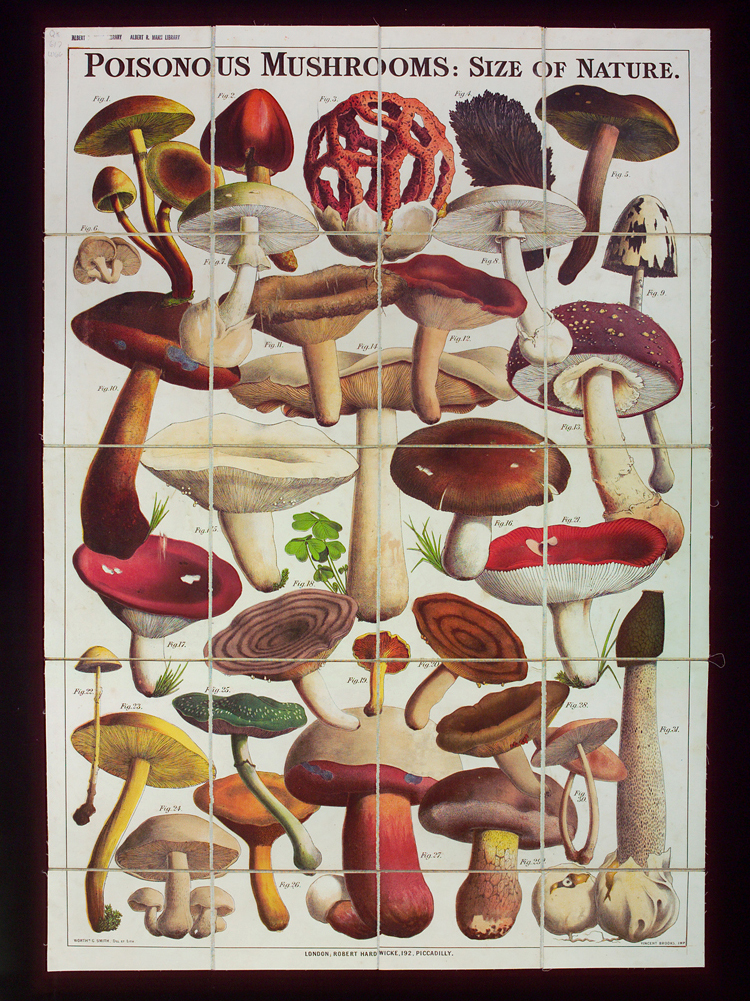

Smith worked for the architect Sir Horace Jones, becoming an expert draughtsman and a member of the Architectural Association. In 1855 he was diagnosed with a heart condition and he moved with his wife to Dunstable. Here he made excursions for studying botany and archaeology. In 1861, he left the profession (having been required to design drains for Sir Horace) and embarked on a second career as a freelance illustrator. He put his former experience to use by producing illustrations for The Builder (a journal still published today) and continued as a regular contributor for the next twenty years. He published extensively on the fungi producing illustrated books that were popular.

In 1878, he described himself thus:

the writer of these lines never had any teacher, either artistic or scientific, other than he always found supplied to him by close observation, careful reading, experience, and constant perseverance.

== Botany and horticulture ==
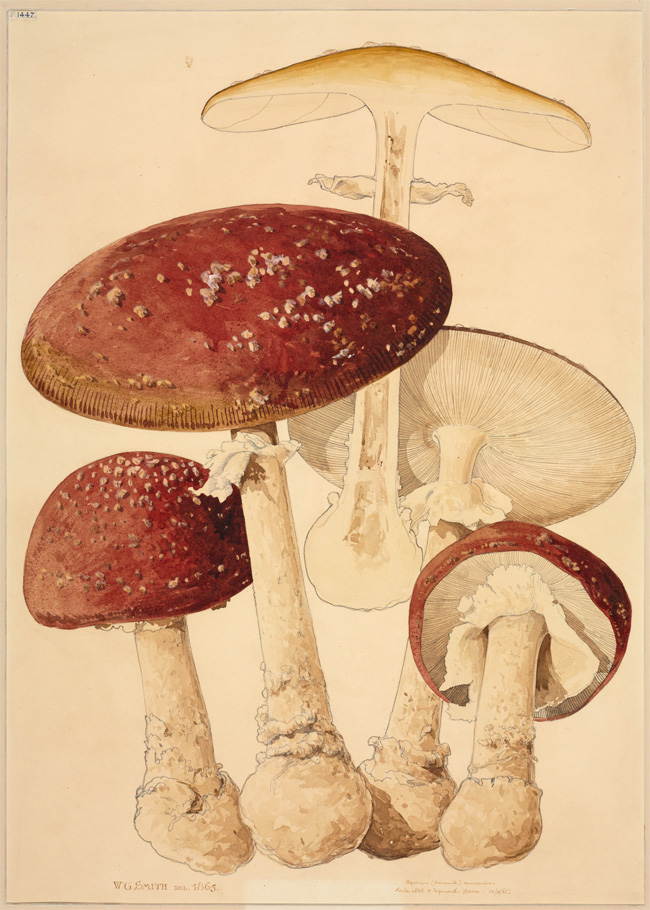
Amanita muscaria

Smith had an interest in natural history and gardening, and gradually developed a reputation as a botanical illustrator. His work appeared in the Gardeners' Chronicle and in 1869 he became its chief illustrator, retaining this position for the next 40 years. He also contributed illustrations to the Journal of Horticulture and other periodicals.

In 1880, he co-authored Illustrations of the British Flora with the noted botanical illustrator Walter Hood Fitch.

== Mycology and plant pathology ==
Smith's particular expertise was in fungi, which he collected, studied, and illustrated. He published extensively, writing over 200 articles and papers, as well as several books. His first major work in 1867 was to produce coloured illustrations of poisonous and edible fungi, printed in linen-backed poster format with an accompanying booklet. He published Clavis Agaricinorum (a key to British agarics) in 1870, wrote a popular book on mushrooms and toadstools in 1879, illustrated Stevenson's Hymenomycetes Britannici in 1886, and produced a supplement to M.J. Berkeley's Outlines of British Fungology in 1891.

In 1875, Smith published a paper describing and illustrating the overwintering spores of Phytophthora infestans, the causal agent of late blight of potatoes, the disease responsible for the Great Famine of Ireland. For this he was awarded the Royal Horticultural Society's Knightian gold medal. The German mycologist Anton de Bary pointed out that Smith had actually described some contaminating spores, but national pride upheld Smith's reputation as a plant pathologist and he was appointed to several governmental commissions on plant diseases, as well as publishing a book on the subject in 1884.

He restored Sowerby's clay models of fungal fruitbodies displayed at the Natural History Museum and in 1898 wrote a successful short guide to them (later revised and reissued by John Ramsbottom). In 1908, he also wrote a "descriptive catalogue" of the specimens and drawings of the British basidiomycetes held at the museum.

Smith was the first mycologist to lead a fungus foray. In 1868 he was invited by the Woolhope Naturalists' Field Club to be the expert leader of a field meeting dubbed "a foray among the funguses". This was so successful that the club held annual "forays" for the next 24 years. Smith helped publicize the club and its forays with a series of cartoons in various journals, some of them caricaturing the leading mycologists of the day. He also designed illustrated menus in similar style for the club's annual fungus dinners at the Green Dragon in Hereford. Smith became an honorary member of the club and in 1874, as a token of appreciation, was presented with a set of cutlery engraved with fungi taken from his illustrations. In 1896 Worthington G. Smith became a founder member of the British Mycological Society and was elected its President in 1904. He was also a Fellow of the Linnean Society.

Smith's reputation as a mycologist and plant pathologist has been overshadowed by the more lasting achievements of his contemporaries. His book on plant diseases was said to have been "out of touch" when published and C.G. Lloyd claimed his Synopsis of the British Basidiomycetes resembled "an attempt by someone living in the Sahara to write a book about a rain forest." Many of the new fungal species described by Smith have been relegated to synonymy, though those that remain current include the agaric Leucoagaricus georginae (W.G. Sm.) Candusso and the bolete Rubinoboletus rubinus (W.G. Sm.) Pilát & Dermek. Smith's collections are now held in the mycological herbarium at the Royal Botanic Gardens, Kew. The species Agaricus worthingtonii Fr., Clitopilus smithii Massee, and Geastrum smithii Lloyd were named after him.

== Archaeology ==
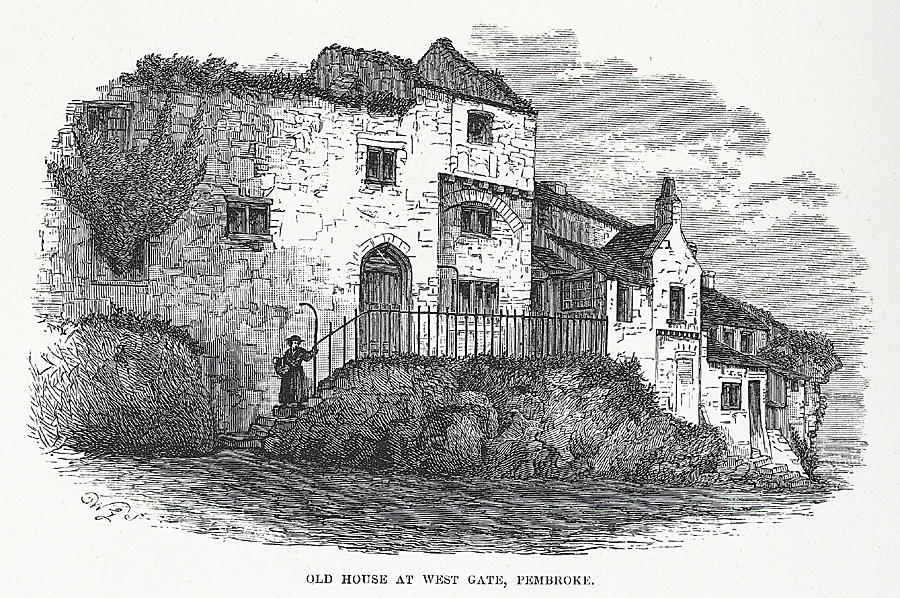
Old House at West Gate, Pembroke. Published in Archaeologia Cambrensis, April 1881.

Worthington G. Smith's reputation as an archaeologist, specializing in the palaeolithic era, has grown rather than diminished. Of the five Lower Palaeolithic occupation sites known from Britain, four were discovered by Smith. He became interested in the subject after reading Sir John Evans's Ancient Stone Implements of Great Britain (1872). In 1878 he found stone tools in building excavations at Stoke Newington Common and traced the tool-bearing layer over a wide area of north-east London. He discovered a similar site at Caddington, Bedfordshire, and published his findings in Man, the Primeval Savage (1894). He subsequently found further sites at Whipsnade and elsewhere, as well as making other archaeological discoveries in the Bedfordshire area.

Smith was influenced by Flaxman Spurrell's discoveries at Crayford and used his technique of refitting lithic artifacts to propose the presence of undisturbed "living floors" at Caddington.

Between 1887 and 1890, Smith acted as an assistant to Stephen Williams on his excavation in Mid-Wales on the Cistercian Abbeys at Strata Florida, Strata Marcella and Abbey Cwmhir. He undertook the surveying on these sites and drawing the finds for publication. Smith also attended the summer meetings of the Cambrian Archaeological Association regularly between 1875 and 1895.

Smith became the local county secretary for the Society of Antiquaries in 1897. In 1902 he was awarded a civil-list pension of £50 per annum "for services to archaeology" on the recommendation of Lord Avebury and Sir John Evans. The items he discovered are now dispersed, but some of his collections are held at the British Museum, Luton Museum, and the Museum of London.

== A freeman of Dunstable ==
For reasons of health, Smith moved to his wife's home town of Dunstable, Bedfordshire, in 1884. There, he not only pursued his mycological and archaeological interests, but also investigated the history of the town. Amongst other things, he discovered and translated the charter granted to the town by King Henry I. As a result of his researches, he wrote an extensive book called Dunstable, its history and surroundings, published in 1904 and reprinted in 1980. In 1903 he became the first freeman of the borough of Dunstable, "in appreciation of the eminent services rendered to his country in connection with his profession, and his munificent gifts to the Corporation".

== Selected works ==
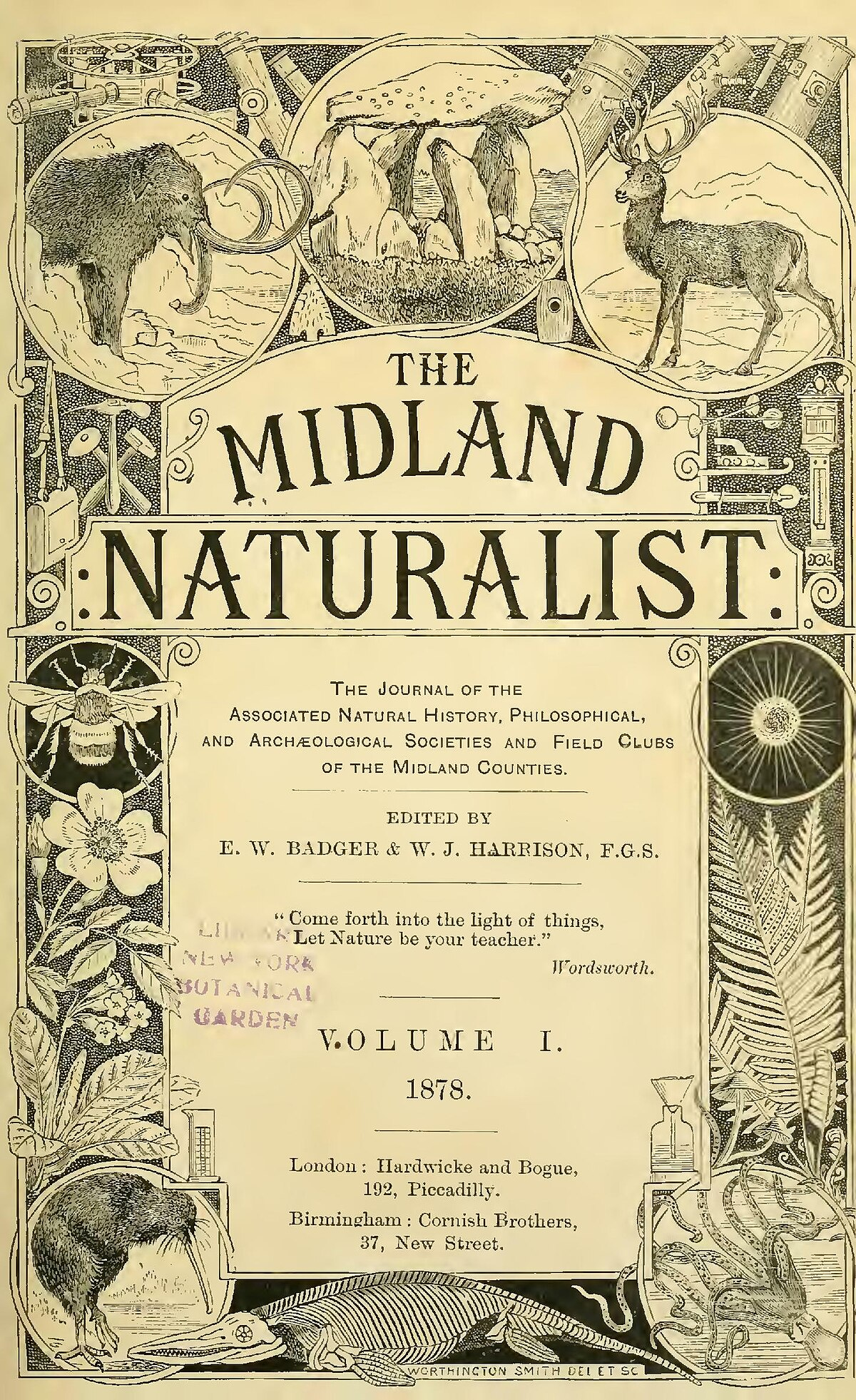
Smith's cover design for The Midland Naturalist, the journal of the Union of Midland Natural History Societies, whose design he described in the first issue

- Mushrooms and Toadstools: How to distinguish easily the differences between the Edible and Poisonous Fungi (David Brogue, 1879).
- Diseases of field and garden crops. (Macmillan, 1884)
- Outlines of British fungology: Supplement. (Reeve, 1891)
- Man, the primeval savage; his haunts and relics from the hilltops of Bedfordshire to Blackwall. (E. Stanford, 1894)
- Guide to Sowerby's models of British fungi in the Department of Botany, British Museum (Natural History). (British Museum, 1898)
- Dunstable: The downs and the district: A handbook for visitors. (The Homeland Association, 1904)
