= William Jerome Harrison =

English geologist and photographer

William Jerome Harrison FGS
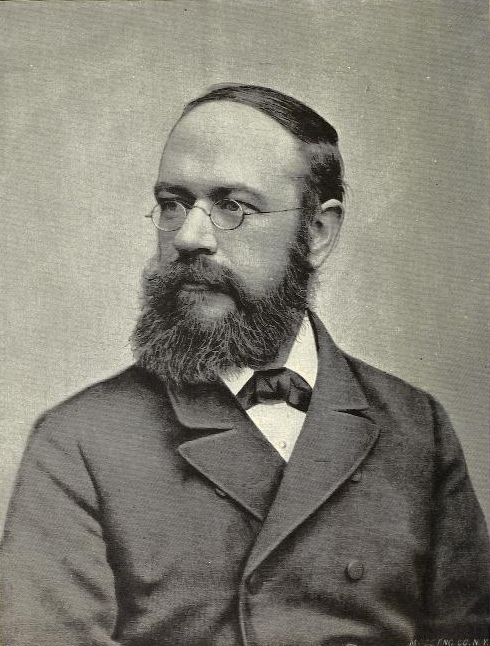
- Born: 16 March 1845; Hemsworth, Yorkshire, United Kingdom of Great Britain and Ireland
- Died: 6 June 1908 (aged 63)
- Education: Westminster Training College; Cheltenham College
- Awards: Darwin Prize
- Scientific career
- Institutions: New Walk Museum

William Jerome Harrison (Note: Often known as W. Jerome Harrison) FGS (16 March 1845 – 6 June 1908), was a British geologist, science writer, and amateur photographer who wrote several textbooks on chemistry, physics, photography, and geology, including the first geological book illustrated with photographs. Born in Hemsworth, Yorkshire, he was educated at Westminster Training College, and afterwards for two years at Cheltenham College. For many years he was curator of the Leicester Town Museum. In 1880 he moved to Birmingham, where he was appointed Chief Science Master under the Birmingham School Board. His books include A History of Photography, The Chemistry of Photography, and Geology of the Counties of England and of North and South Wales. Harrison is also credited with being the founder of the National Photographic Record and Survey Movement which led to the formation of the National Photographic Record Association in 1897.

He edited, jointly with Edward W. Badger, volumes 1 to 9 of The Midland Naturalist, the journal of the Midland Union of Natural History Societies, to which he also contributed articles. In 1885 he was awarded the Union's Darwin Prize for original research in geology.
