= Edmond Carlier =

Scottish physiologist and entomologist

Edmond William Wace Carlier FRSE FRES
- Portrait by Walter Stoneman, c. 1916
- Born: 1861; Norwich, England
- Died: 2 September 1940 (aged 78–79); Dorridge, Warwickshire, England
- Education: King Edward VI School, Norwich; Lycée de Valenciennes; University of Edinburgh; University of Birmingham
- Known for: Research on physiology and hibernation
- Spouse: Hannah Culver
- Children: Geoffroy Carlier; Stuart Edmond Wace Carlier; Gwendoline Isobel Maud Carlier
- Scientific career
- Fields: Physiology; Entomology
- Institutions: University of Edinburgh; University of Birmingham

Dr Edmond William Wace Carlier FRSE FRES (1861 – 2 September 1940) was a Scottish physiologist and entomologist. He was the principal examiner in physiology for fellowship in the Royal College of Surgeons from 1909 to 1914.

== Life ==
Carlier was born in Norwich, the only son of Marie and Antoine Guillaime Carlier. He was educated at the King Edward VI School in Norwich and then attended the Lycee de Valenciennes in France.

Later he graduated from the University of Edinburgh where he gained an MD on hibernation in 1891 before also receiving a MSc degree from the University of Birmingham. From 1895 he acted as assistant lecturer in physiology at the University of Edinburgh. In 1899 he received a professorship in Physiology from the University of Birmingham. He remained at the University until he retired in 1927.

In 1898 he was elected a Fellow of the Royal Society of Edinburgh.

In 1926 he was involved in the bicentenary celebrations of the Medical Faculty at the University of Edinburgh. In his spare time he was a keen butterfly collector.

He died at Morningside in Dorridge in Warwickshire on 2 September 1940.

== Family ==
In 1898 he married Hannah Culver (d.1929). They had two sons, Geoffroy Carlier and Stuart Edmond Wace Carlier (1899-1962). His daughter Gwendoline Isobel Maud Carlier was also an academic.

== Positions held ==
- Honorary Secretary of the Scottish Microscopical Society
- Chief Examiner in Physiology for England and Wales
