= Walter Douglas Hincks =

British entomologist (1906–1961)

Walter Douglas Hincks FRES
- Born: 3 September 1901
- Died: 12 June 1961 (aged 59)
- Known for: Research and taxonomic studies of Dermaptera
- Scientific career
- Fields: Chemistry; Entomology
- Institutions: Yorkshire Museum; Manchester Museum

Walter Douglas Hincks FRES (3 September 1906 – 12 June 1961) was a British entomologist and museum curator. He was a world expert on the Dermaptera, but worked extensively on beetles such as the Chrysomelidae.

== Biography ==
Hincks originally trained as a chemist and worked in the Pharmaceutical sector before his transition to professional entomology. He became passionate for entomology during his time as a member of the Leeds Naturalist's Club and was particularly encourage to take an interest in the Dermaptera by Malcolm Burr.

In 1941 he spent some time rearranging the coleoptera collections at the Yorkshire Museum. The following year he was appointed the Honorary Curator of Entomology (excluding the lepidoptera). During 1942 Hincks worked with A. Smith and Reginald Wagstaffe to collect entomological specimens from Askham Bog for the museum collections. He was instrumental in bringing the Ellis collection of insects to the museum in 1945.

Hincks replaced Harry Britten as Assistant Keeper at the Manchester Museum in 1947. In 1957 he was promoted to Keeper and remained in this position until his death in 1961. He, along with his technician (and eventual successor) Alan Brindle, were responsible for developing the extent and geographic scope of the Dermaptera collection at the museum.

He was president of the Manchester Entomological Society in 1952–1953. Hincks also served as the Assistant Secretary for the North Western Naturalists' Society, and was recorder of the Lancashire and Cheshire Fauna Committee. He was a member of the Yorkshire Naturalists' Union, the Microscopy Society, and the Society for British Entomology. He was a member of the Yorkshire Philosophical Society during his time in York.

Hincks published widely on the Dermaptera of the world, often in international journals, and was responsible for naming several new species of that order. He was well also known as the co-author, with George Kloet, of "A Checklist of British Insects".

== Select publications ==
- Hincks, W.D. 1938. "Die Arthropodenfauna von Madeira nach den Ergebnissen der Reise von Prof. O. Lundblad Juli–August 1935. XI. Dermaptera", Arkiv för Zoologi 30B(12), 1–8.
- Hincks, W.D. 1940. "Dermaptera (earwigs) from Hainan Island". Notes d’Entomologie Chinoise 8(2), 29–40.
- Hincks, W.D. 1947. "A new species of earwig from Sierra Leone (Dermaptera)", Entomologist 80, 201–203.
- Kloet, G.S. and Hincks, W.D. 1945. A Checklist of British Insects. Stockport.
- Hincks, W.D. 1954. "Obituary: Harry Britten, M.Sc., A.L.S., F.R.E.S", Journal of the society for British entomology 4, 225–228.
- Hincks, W.D. 1955. A Systematic Monograph of the Dermaptera of the World. Part I. Pygidicranidae: Diplatyinae. British Museum (Natural History), London.
- Hincks, W.D. 1955. "New species of pygidicranine earwigs (Dermaptera: Pygidicranidae)". Annals and Magazine of Natural History 12(8), 806–827. doi:10.1080/00222935508655701
- Hincks, W.D. 1957. "Dermaptera". South African Animal Life 4, 33–94.
- Hincks, W.D. 1959. A Systematic Monograph of the Dermaptera of the World. Part II. Pygidicranidae excluding Diplatyinae. British Museum (Natural History), London.
