= Midland Union of Natural History Societies =

- Established: 1877 (148 years ago)
- Dissolved: c. 1894
- Country: United Kingdom of Great Britain and Ireland

The Midland Union of Natural History Societies (initially the Union of Midland Natural History Societies) was an association of amateur groups in the English Midlands and central Wales, which existed from 1877. For sixteen years it published a journal, The Midland Naturalist, and from 1881 awarded a medal, the Darwin Prize. The phrase "Natural History" was interpreted broadly, and the groups' interests included archaeology, architecture and geology.

== History ==
The success of a Tamworth Natural History, Geological, and Antiquarian Society meeting held early in 1874, joined by the Birmingham Natural History and Microscopical Society (BNHMS) led William G. Blatch, Honorary Secretary of the latter, to propose closer collaboration between local natural history societies. Eventually, on 17 August 1876 committee meeting of the Birmingham society, decided to investigate the formation of a union of such groups. Representatives of various societies met at the Midland Institute, Birmingham, on 28 August 1877, and elected a council to manage the union.

The eminent surgeon and president of the BNHMS, Lawson Tait, played a leading role in the formation and early administration of the Union. He resigned his positions on the managing bodies of both organisations in 1878, in a dispute over the Union's subscription fees.

In 1885, the Union wrote a letter to The Times (published 6 July) pointing out "that many of our rarest and most beautiful native plants have already been, or are being, rapidly exterminated" due to over-enthusiastic collection by both botanists and professional dealers, and calling for measures to reduce this loss. The calls were supported in an editorial in the same issue.

The last press reports on the Union's activities appeared in the Birmingham Daily Post in August 1894, when:

In proposing a vote of thanks to the out-going president, Mr. Jebb said Mr. Wilkinson had stuck to the union in a crisis, and he hoped there was now a brighter time in store for them.

=== Presidents ===
- 1880: Herewald Wake
- Circa 1881: Thomas Wright
- 1882: Egbert de Hamel
- 1884: John Perowne
- 1885: Robert William Chase
- 1886: J. D. La Touche
- 1887: George E. Mackie
- 1892 – July 1893: A. T. Jebb
- July 1893 – August 1894: W. H. Wilkinson
- August 1894: R. C. Tower

== Midland Naturalist ==
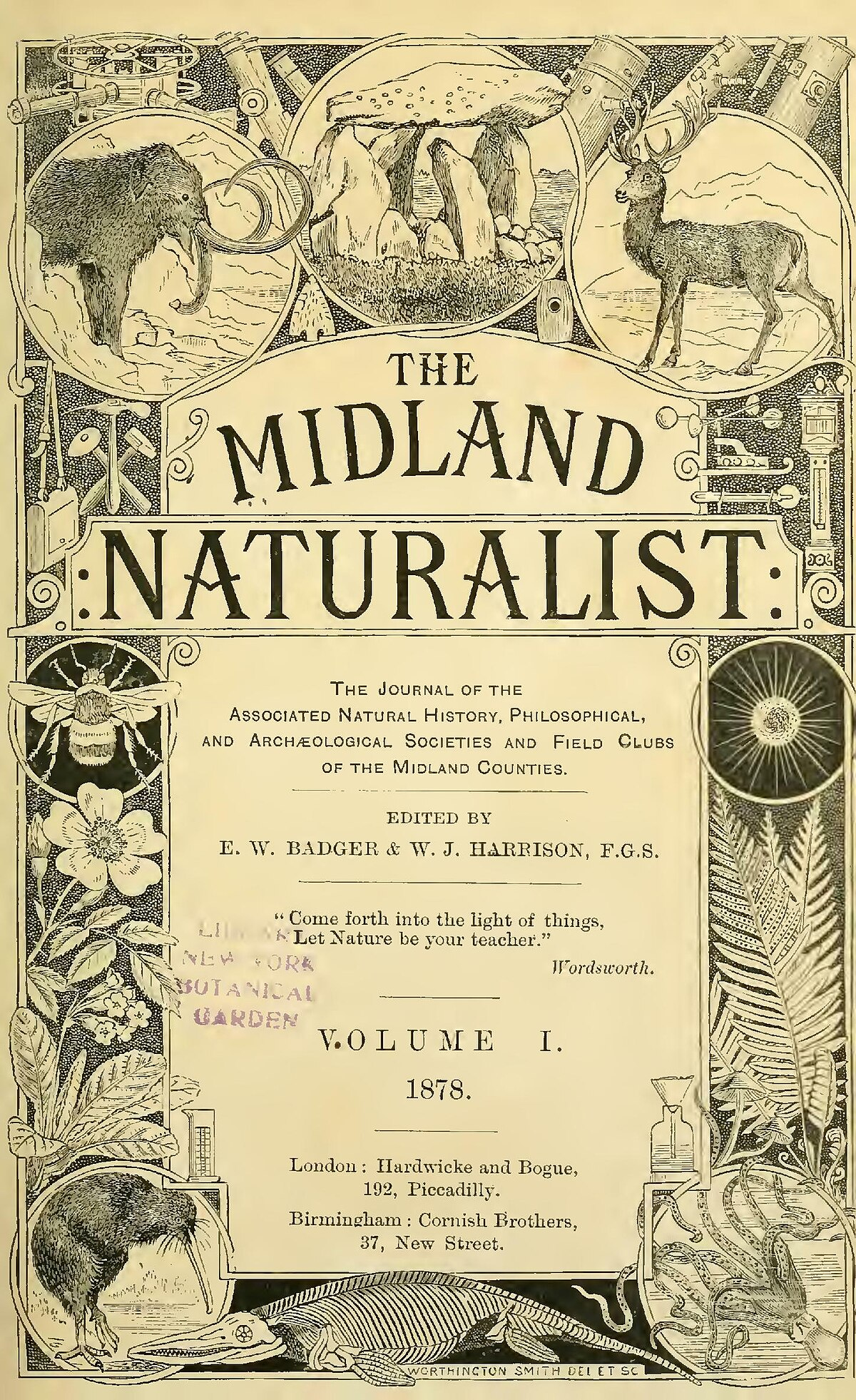
Cover of the first volume of Midland Naturalist by Worthington Smith, who described his design in the first issue.

A journal, The Midland Naturalist, subtitled "The Journal of The Associated Natural History, Philosophical, and Archæologigal Societies and Field Clubs of the Midland Counties", was published from 1878 to 1893. Volumes 1-9 were edited by Edward W. Badger and William Jerome Harrison; Volumes 10-16 by Badger and W. Hillhouse.

From 1883 (volume 6) the journal incorporated the Annual Proceedings of the Birmingham Natural History and Microscopical Society, which had previously been published separately. From volume 7 it took on the same role for the Leicester Literary and Philosophical Society.

At least one species description was published in the journal, that for the edible fungus Russula claroflava, whose type specimen was found in Sutton Park by William Bywater Grove in 1888.

The Birmingham Daily Post article of August 1894 referred to the journal as "now defunct", without further explanation.

== Darwin Prize ==
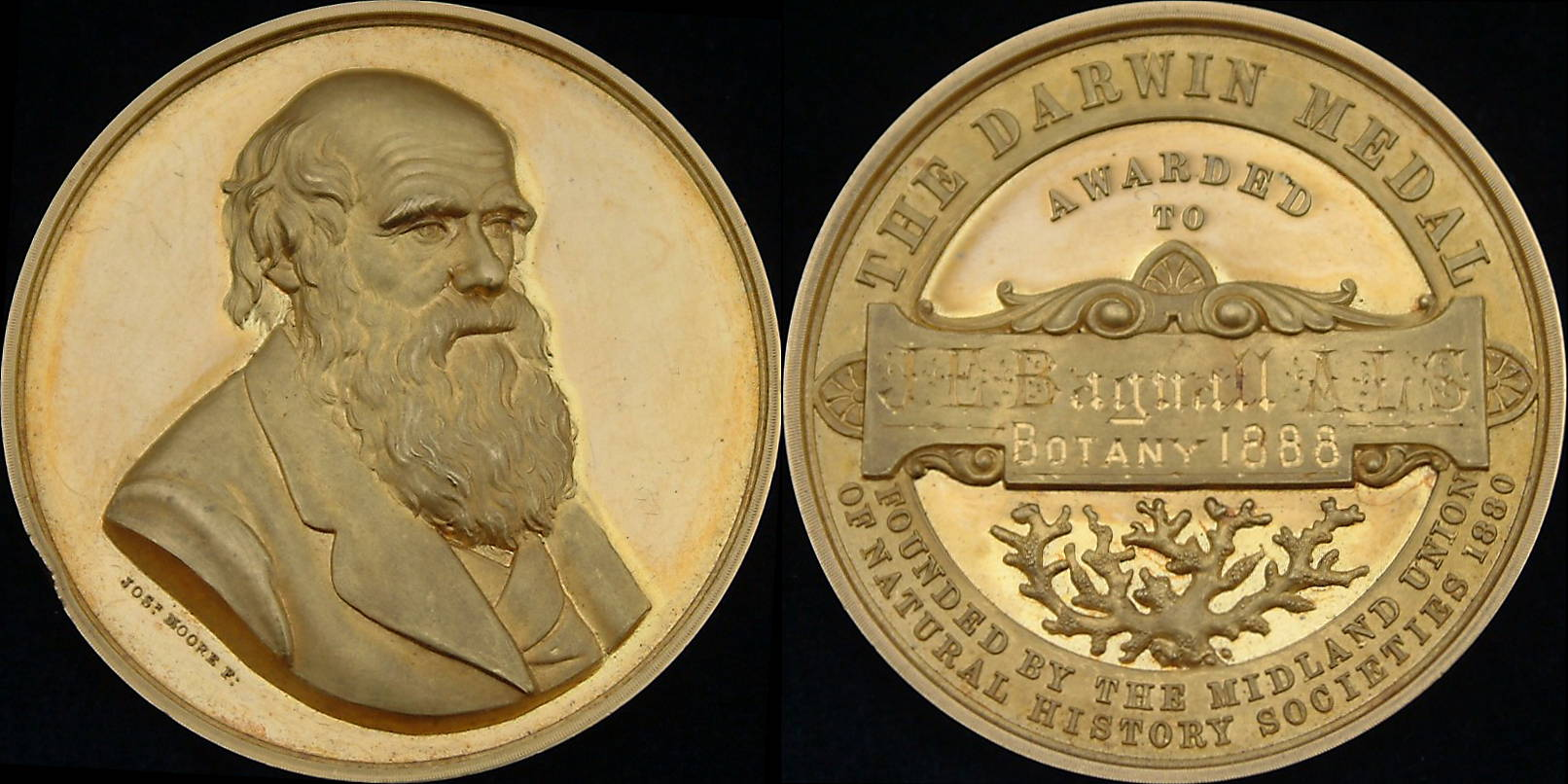
Gold Darwin Prize medal, awarded to James Eustace Bagnall and engraved "J.E. Bagnall ALS Botany 1888"

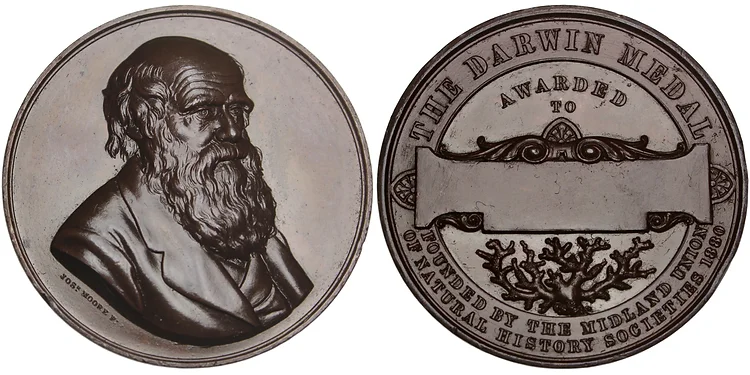
Bronze Darwin Prize medal, unissued

The society established an annual award in 1880, for original research by individual members of the member societies, submitted for publication in The Midland Naturalist, in the fields of geology, archaeology, zoology, or botany. Recipients had a choice of a gold medal, or a bronze medal and cash, with a total value of £10 (equivalent to £1,257 in 2023) initially. Permission to name the award after Charles Darwin, and to include his likeness on the medal, was granted by Darwin himself, who wrote:

"[your] wish to name the Medal after me is a very great honour, which I gladly accept. It is particularly pleasing to me to have my name connected, in however indirect a manner, with a scheme for advancing Science—the study of which has been my chief source of happiness throughout life."

The medal was engraved by Joseph Moore, of Birmingham. Its obverse showed a bust of Darwin, facing slightly right, below which was signed "JOSE^{H.} MOORE F.". The reverse featured the wording "The Darwin Medal / Awarded to / Founded by the Midland Union of Natural History Societies 1880", with space on a cartouche for the recipient's name, year and subject area, and below that a depiction of a branch of coral. The edge was plain.

The award was first given in 1881 and was restricted to the topic of geology, the next year to biology, and the third year to archaeology, then the pattern repeated, before being abandoned. Recipients included:

- 1881: Edward Wilson, for geological research
- 1882: Professor A. Milnes Marshall, and William Prime Marshall, for investigations into the life-history of the Pennatulida (William was Milnes's father)
- 1883: [no award]
- 1884: William Bywater Grove, for a monograph on the Pilobolidæ and other botanical papers
- 1885: William Jerome Harrison, for geological research
- 1886: [no award]
- 1887: Edward W. Badger, for his paper "The Monumental Brasses of Warwickshire"
- 1888: James Eustace Bagnall

The Birmingham Daily Post article of August 1894 noted an agreement that, with the demise of The Midland Naturalist, the prize "should in future be awarded to the author of the best paper on a given subject in a newspaper or journal within the area of the union".

The wax model for the medal is now at Darwin's former home, Down House, along with the unused 1886 medal, which was sent to Darwin's family at that time.

== Members ==
In its first year, membership of the Union included:

- Birmingham Natural History and Microscopical Society
- Birmingham Philosophical Society (merged with the above in 1894)
- Birmingham School Natural History Society
- Burton-on-Trent Natural History and Archælogical Society
- Ceradoc Field Club
- Derbyshire Naturalists' Society
- Dudley and Midland Geological and Philosophical Society and Field Club
- Leicester Literary and Philosophical Society
- Northampton Naturalists' Society
- Nottingham Literary and Philosophical Society (dissolved in the year 1882-1883)
- Nottingham Naturalists' Society (withdrew in the year 1885/1886)
- Rugby School Natural History Society
- Oswestry and Welshpool Naturalists' Field Club
- Severn Valley Naturalists' Field Club
- Shropshire Archæological and Natural History Society
- Stroud Natural History and Philosophical Society
- Tamworth Natural History, Geological and Antiquarian Society

Additional members, with date of joining, included:

- Peterborough Natural History and Scientific Society (year ending May 1879)
- Nottingham High School Natural History Society (year ending May 1879)
- Small Heath Literary and Scientific Society (year ending May 1879)
- Bedfordshire Natural History and Field Club (1880; withdrew in the year 1885/1886)
