= Tanat Valley =

Valley in Wales

Coordinates: 52°48′45″N 3°17′35″W

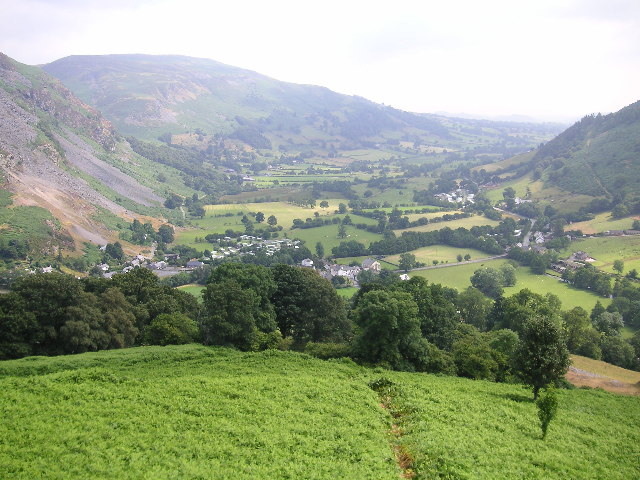
The village of Llangynog and the Tanat Valley

The Tanat Valley (Welsh: Dyffryn Tanat) is a large valley in northern Powys, Wales, formed by the course of the River Tanat and its tributaries. Situated south of the Berwyn range, the valley forms from at Llangynog from the merger of two narrow valleys, the Cwm Pennant and Cwm Rhiwarth. Various historic sites, including the Iron Age hillfort Llwyn Bryn-Dinas and the medieval St Melangell's Church are located along the valley. Largely agrarian, sheep farming has formed a major industry in the region for several centuries. Large-scale slate and lead mining in the region lasted from the 16th to late 20th century, although earlier mines possibly existed during the Iron Age.

== Geology ==
The alluvial valley is primarily composed of Ordovician sedimentary rocks such as mudstone and shale, with smaller amounts of tuff and calcareous rocks. Mineral deposits in the valley include galena, sphalerite, chalcopyrite, barite, and witherite. The soils are podzolic and rich in clay.

== Geography ==
The tributary streams of the Afon Tanat have their sources in the Aran and Berwyn ranges along the northwestern borders of Powys. The western extent of the valley is divided into two main valleys: the Cwm Pennant, following the upper Tanat; and the Cwm Rhiwarth, following the Afon Eirth. The two river valleys merge at the village of Llangynog. The Berwyn range lies to the north of the valley, rising up to 500 meters above the valley floor, with the rolling Montgomery Hills to the south. The valley floor is generally between 100–200 metres (330–660 ft) O.D.

=== Cwm Pennant ===
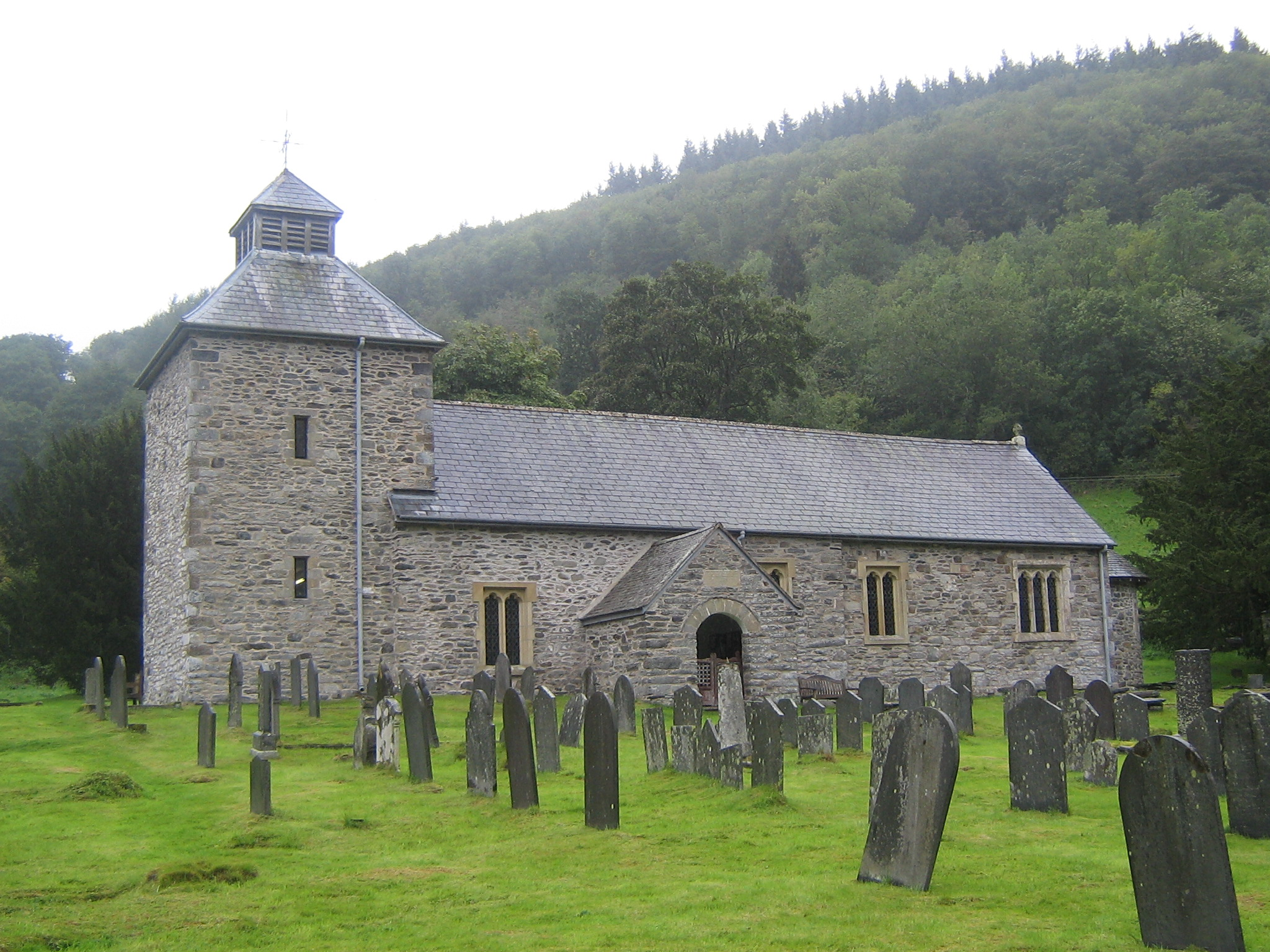
Pennant Melangell, a medieval church in the Cwm Pennant

The Cwm Pennant is a narrow valley following the upper course of the Afon Tanat, prior to its merger with the Afon Eirth at Llangynog. Pennant Melangell, a former village and medieval church, is located in the valley. A small, narrow valley, the Cwm Llêch, emerges from the south of the Cwm Pennant, following the course of the Afon Goch.

=== Cwm Blowty ===
The Cwm Blowty follows the Afon Rhaeadr upstream of Llanrhaeadr-ym-Mochnant. A large waterfall, the Pistyll Rhaeadr, lies at the head of the valley.

== History ==
=== Prehistoric and ancient settlements ===
The earliest evidence of human presence in the Tanat Valley dates to the Upper Palaeolithic; a barbed point from c. 12,000 BC indicates temporary hunting settlements in the area. Hunter-gatherer seasonal settlements likely existed in the Mesolithic and Neolithic. Permanent settlements were likely established in the Late Neolithic or Bronze Age. Although no settlements from the Late Neolithic period are known, several Bronze Age funerary sites are located around the valley, including henges, burial mounds, and cairns. The Rhos-y-Beddau stone circle sits in the hanging valley of the Rhaeadr, upstream of the Pistyll Rhaeadr.

Two Iron Age hillforts, Llwyn Bryn-Dinas and Craig Rhiwarth, lie above the valley. These may have been a center of early metallurgy, due to abundant iron ore deposits in the region. An Iron Age hut circle has been found at Garnedd Wen, east of Craig Rhiwarth. Mining likely took place at the lead mines of Cwm Orog and Crag y Mwyn during the Roman period.

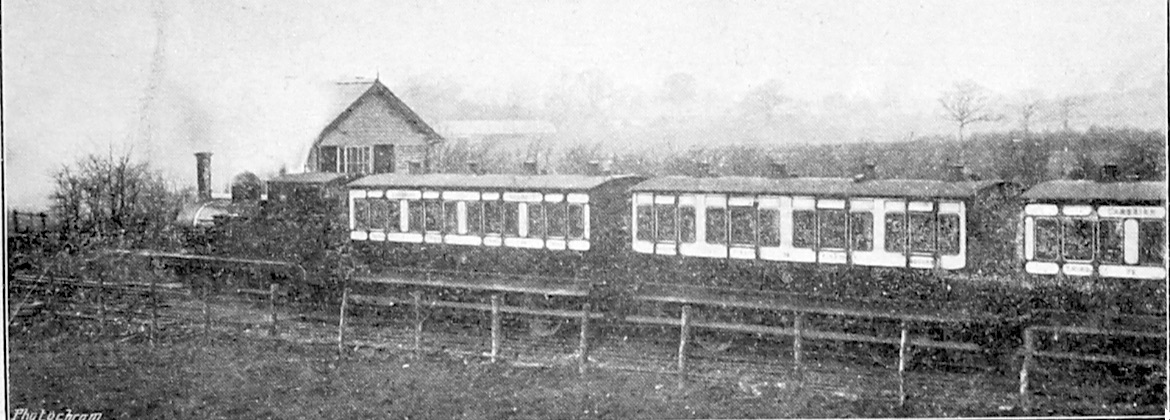
Tanat Valley Light Railway trains, 1904.

=== Medieval period ===
Pennant Melangell and Llanrhaeadr, the principal settlements of the largely rural agrarian valley, were both founded as ecclesiastical sites in the medieval period. Pennant Melangell is associated with Saint Melangell, who supposedly founded a nunnery in the area, and the shrine dedicated to her. Llanrhaeadr was formed as a clas dedicated to Saint Dogfan. Sheep farming has been a major industry in the area since the 16th century. Cattle farming also takes place in the valley.

=== Modern period ===
Limestone quarries have long been used in the region. Slate quarries and lead mines also emerged in the 16th century, continuing into the 20th century. The 18th and 19th centuries were the period of greatest mining activity, mainly centered at the Llangynog mine. Five smaller mines surrounded Llangynog, alongside two at Cwm Hirnant. Although metal mining largely stopped after the closure of the Llangynog mine in 1899, activity at Cwm Orog continued until 1912, alongside slate and rhyolite quarrying throughout the early 20th century. Mining operations at Llangynog led to large-scale heavy metal contamination across the whole of the valley.

The Tanat Valley Light Railway was opened in 1904 to serve the communities in the region, continuing operations until 1964.
