= St Melangell's Church =

Medieval church in Powys, Wales

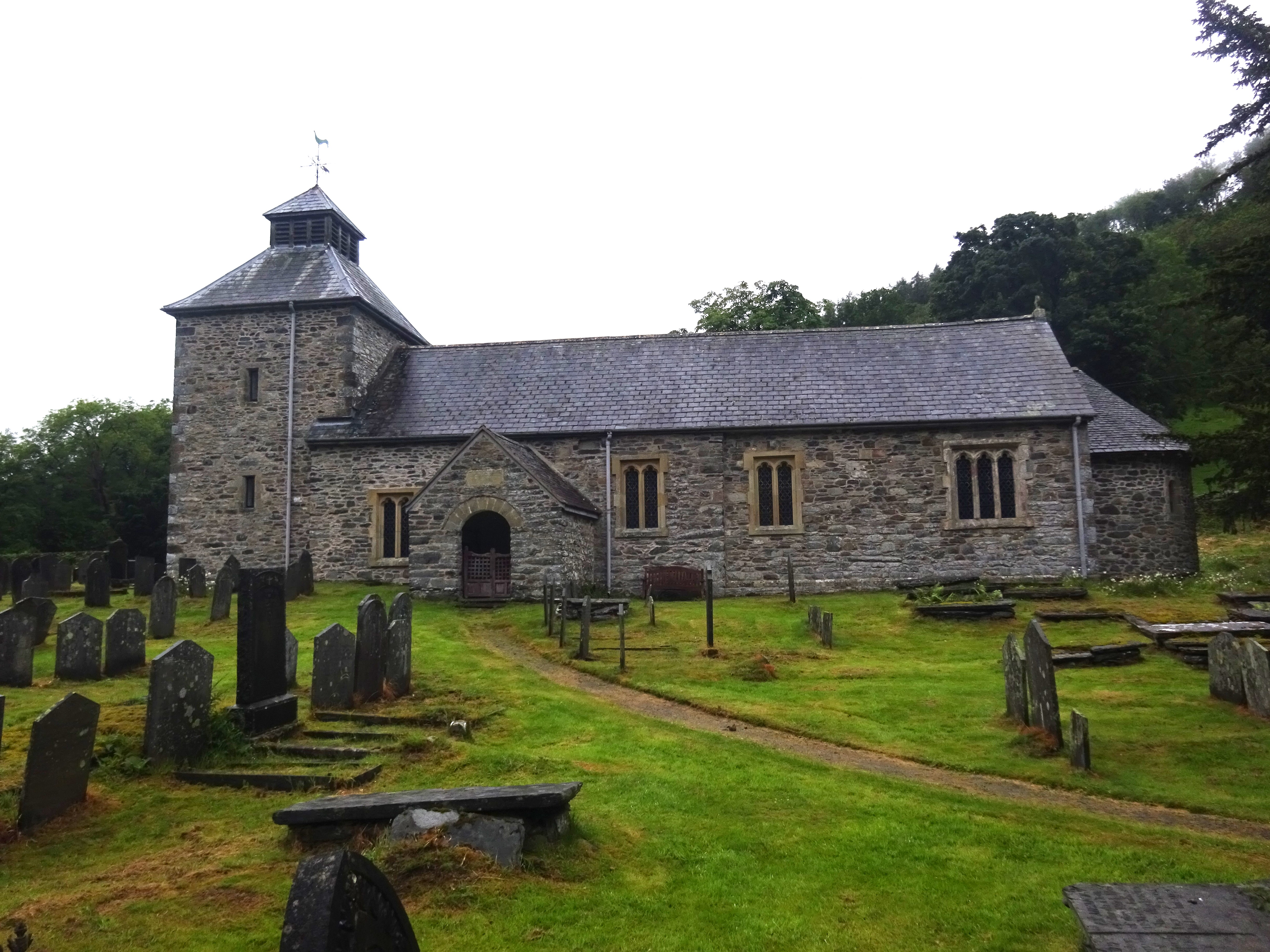
- Church and churchyard

- Location within Wales
- 52°49′39″N 3°26′59″W
- Location: Pennant Melangell, Llangynog, Powys
- Country: Wales
- Denomination: Church in Wales
- Website: stmelangell.org

Architecture
- Style: Romanesque
- Years built: c. 1150 – 1175

Administration
- Diocese: St Asaph
- Deanery: Mathrafal
- Parish: Mission Area of Tanat-Vyrnwy

Listed Building – Grade I
- Designated: 31 January 1953
- Reference no.: 7634

St Melangell's Church (Welsh: [mɛˈlaŋgɛɬ]) is a Grade I listed medieval building of the Church in Wales located in the former village of Pennant Melangell, in the Tanat Valley, Powys, Wales. The church was founded around the 8th century to commemorate the reputed grave of Melangell, a hermit and abbess who founded a convent and sanctuary in the area. The current church was built in the 12th century and the oldest documentation of it dates to the 13th century. The building has been renovated several times, including major restoration work in the 19th and 20th centuries. In the 1980s the church was in danger of demolition, but under new leadership it was renovated and a cancer ministry was started. In 1958, and again between 1987 and 1994, the site was subject to major archaeological excavations, which uncovered information about prehistoric and medieval activity at Pennant Melangell, including evidence of Bronze Age burials.

St Melangell's Church contains the reconstructed shrine to Melangell, considered the oldest surviving Romanesque shrine in northern Europe. The shrine dates to the 12th century, and was a major centre of cult activity in Wales until the Reformation. It was dismantled at some point, probably in the early modern era, and reconstructed in 1958 out of fragments found in and around the church. In 1989 the shrine was dismantled again and restored in 1991 according to newer scholarship. Pennant Melangell has continued to attract pilgrims of various backgrounds and motivations into the 21st century.

The church is built of several types of stone and has a single nave and a square tower. On the east end is an apse, known as the cell-y-bedd, (Note: Cell-y-bedd translates to "grave chamber" in Welsh. The cell is also called the capel-y-bedd, or "grave chapel".) which contains Melangell's traditional grave. The interior of the church holds historically valuable objects including a 15th-century rood screen depicting Melangell's legend, two 14th-century effigies, paintings, and liturgical fittings. The churchyard contains thousands of graves—the majority unmarked—and several yew trees.

== Location and surroundings ==
Pennant Melangell is located in the Tanat Valley, near the Berwyn Mountains, in the community of Llangynog. The church is only accessible by a narrow road from Llangynog, following the course of the Afon Tanat, making it more isolated than many other popular pilgrimage churches.

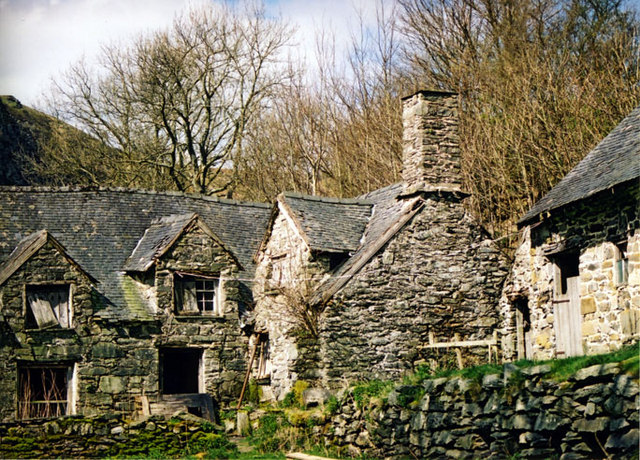
Farmhouse at Pennant Melangell

As of 1994, the land surrounding the church was privately owned, but from the 18th century until 1886 it was held by the church's rectors and vicars as glebe farmland, which supported their livelihoods. Remains of structures including sheepfolds, enclosures, shelters, huts, and peat-drying platforms suggest that the land was used for summer grazing and peat-cutting.

Other historic sites nearby include a late-medieval farmstead, the remains of the medieval village surrounding the church, and a natural rock shelf known as Gwely Melangell (Melangell's Bed). At some unknown date, probably in the 19th century, the words "St Monacella's Bed" (Note: Monacella is the Latin rendering of Melangell.) were carved into the stone. Around a kilometre north of the church is a holy well known as Ffynnon Cwm Ewyn or Ffynnon Iewyn, traditionally thought to cure rheumatism, scrofula, and skin diseases.

== History ==
The site of St Melangell's Church held spiritual significance as far back as the Bronze Age, and was probably turned into a Christian site in the early medieval period. Archaeological evidence of cremation pyres suggests that there was a burial mound at Pennant in the Bronze Age, possibly under the church itself. Bronze Age pottery and early medieval burial activity has also been discovered, indicating the site's use as a burial ground until the construction of the church.

=== Medieval period ===
According to her hagiography Historia Divae Monacellae, Melangell sought refuge at Pennant after fleeing an arranged marriage in her native Ireland. She spent 15 years in solitude without seeing a man, until being discovered by a prince named Brochwel. The prince, pursuing a hare with his dogs, encountered Melangell praying with the hare safe under her hem. Brochwel granted her the land with perpetual sanctuary rights for anyone fleeing to Pennant, and Melangell went on to found a community of nuns.

Pennant Melangell was probably founded in the late 8th century, and references to abbots in Melangell's hagiography indicate that a male monastic community was later founded at the site. Neither the male nor female monasteries remained by the 13th century, when the first documentation of the church appears. Historically, locals of the area refused to kill hares due to their association with Melangell. According to the archaeologist Caroline Malim, the veneration of hares at Pennant probably has origins in pre-Christian Celtic religion.

Under Norman rule in the 11th and 12th centuries, (Note: The Norman conquest of Wales began shortly after that of England in 1066, and Norman influence in Wales was established from the 1060s.) the Welsh Church was reformed. Saints' cults were revived and Normanised, (Note: Parish structures were reorganised, churches were built or rebuilt in the continental Romanesque style, and some Celtic saints were reidentified with saints familiar to the Normans, such as Curig being identified with the Roman-era saint Cyricus.) including that of Melangell. Before the construction of the current church, no definitive evidence exists for one existing at the site, and no pre-Norman buildings survive in Wales. A stretch of possible wall footing indicates that there may have been a timber church built no earlier than the 11th century, which was then replaced. The current stone church was built in the 12th century, probably over an earlier medieval graveyard, which in turn was built over a Bronze Age burial mound. The shrine to Melangell also dates to the 12th century, and was probably locally crafted under Norman influence. According to the historian Kathryn Hurlock, the shrine was erected around 1160–1170 to house Melangell's translated remains, and the 12th-century apse enclosed her original grave.

According to Malcolm Thurlby, the church was constructed "[no] later than the third quarter of the twelfth century", very probably by the lord of the area, Rhirid Flaidd. This would have coincided with the great ecclesiastical patronage of his liege, the king of Powys, Madog ap Maredudd. The first written records of the Pennant church appear in the Valuation of Norwich of 1254, in which the church property is valued slightly below average for the Diocese of St Asaph. In 1291, however, the church was one of the more valuable churches in the diocese, probably owing to a rise in popularity of Melangell's cult. By the 15th century, the poet Guto'r Glyn records that pilgrims were known to visit the shrine of Melangell for a cure to their ailments. The entire roof was probably replaced in the 15th century, and the current rood screen was added. An aisle on the south side of the chancel may have been added to aid pilgrims' access to the shrine in the late medieval period.

=== Reformation and aftermath ===
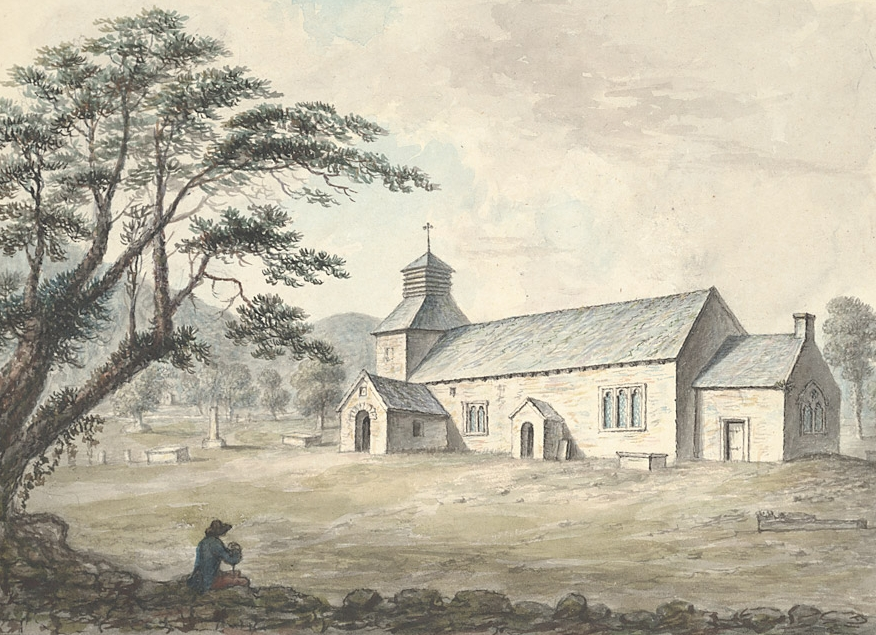
A 1795 watercolour of St Melangell's Church by John Ingleby, showing the square cell-y-bedd at the east end

Melangell's cult remained popular until the Reformation; in 1535 the income from offerings at the shrine was comparable to that of other major cult centres in Wales. In the summer of 1535, Henry VIII sent preachers and officials to the Diocese of St Asaph to promote reform. The religious reforms under Henry VIII, Edward VI, and Elizabeth I, which suppressed pilgrimage and saints' cults, brought major changes to the fabric of the church; the shrine was probably dismantled at this time and the grave chapel blocked off. Portions of the shrine were incorporated into the walls of the church and the lychgate, which was built in the 17th century. By the 1660s the value of the Pennant church had once again sunk to below average for the diocese. The walls were plastered and seating was introduced into the church at some point from the late 16th century.

Significant repairs and renovations were undertaken throughout the 18th century, including blocking up doors and windows, building a new porch, replacing walls, and possibly dismantling the loft of the rood screen. The old cell-y-bedd was also built at this time, replacing the medieval apse and grave chapel. It was probably built as a schoolroom, and was also used as a vestry. Despite the demolition of the original apse and removal of Melangell's shrine and relics, the tradition surrounding her persisted, and she continued to be associated with the cell-y-bedd.

=== Restoration efforts ===
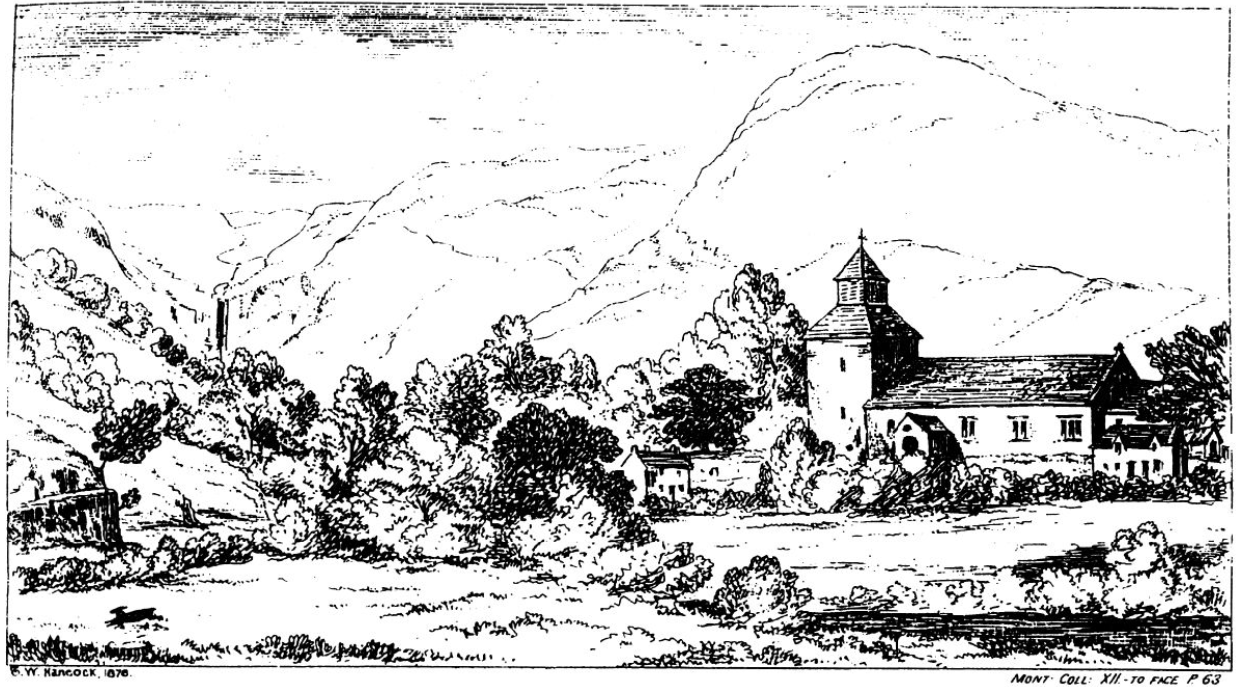
1879 sketch of Pennant Melangell, with the church on the right and Gwely Melangell on the left

The current church tower was built during restoration work in 1876–1877, replacing the previous tower of unknown age. In 1878 new pews and a new altar table were added, and in honour of the restoration a yew tree was planted in the churchyard. St Melangell's Church was transferred to the parish of Llangynog in 1878, and in 1886 the adjacent rectory and vicarage were sold.

After the 19th-century restoration work, the church largely remained in obscurity, and the building deteriorated. With a diminishing congregation, funds were scarce. The condition of the cell-y-bedd was cause for concern by 1954 and there were suggestions that it be demolished entirely. In 1958 the cell-y-bedd was repaired, and the shrine was reconstructed based on a design by the archaeologist Ralegh Radford; minor repair work and excavation in the church and cell-y-bedd was also undertaken.

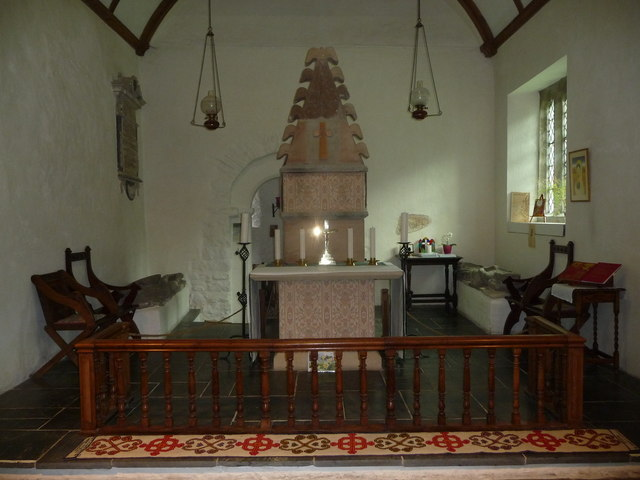
Melangell's shrine in the chancel, with the entrance to the cell-y-bedd in the background

By the 1980s the church had once again deteriorated and was in danger of demolition. At the same time, Paul Davies, the parish priest of Meifod, bought a cottage near the church with his wife following her recovery from cancer. Davies was licensed by the diocese to look after the church on a voluntary basis; under his care, a cancer help centre was started out of their cottage and a complete restoration was undertaken. Work began in 1989, during which the apse was rebuilt and the shrine moved to the chancel. The medieval effigies were moved to the chancel as well, and the furnishings of the church were repaired and rearranged. The church had no electricity or heating, and was still lit with oil lamps; electricity was installed in the church for the first time during the restoration. A service of thanksgiving, attended by the Archbishop of Wales Alwyn Rice Jones, was held on 27 May 1992 in commemoration of the restoration work.

After the death of Paul Davies in 1994, his wife Evelyn took over and continued to develop the shrine's ministries, becoming the first "shrine guardian" of Pennant Melangell. Evelyn Davies was succeeded in the position, which oversees the ministries of the church, by Linda Mary Edwards in 2003 and Lynette Norman in 2011. Since her appointment in 2016, the shrine guardian has been Christine Browne.

=== Modern pilgrimage ===
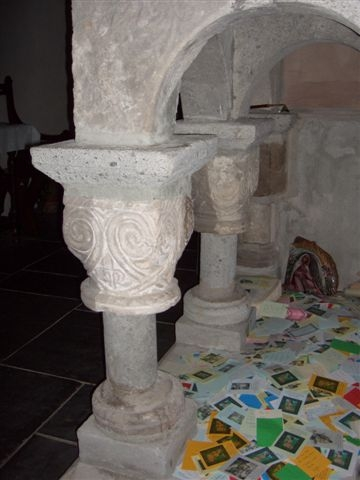
Prayer cards left by devotees

In the 21st century, Pennant Melangell has continued to attract pilgrims, both religious and non-religious. In a 2004 survey of pilgrimage to the site, common motivations for visiting included spiritual, historical, archaeological, and architectural interest. The survey covered religious observance: 83% of visitors attended church at least once a year, and 17% were non-churchgoers; 51% of non-churchgoers expressed spiritual interest in the site, and 38% of non-churchgoers partook in overtly religious activities while at the church, such as prayer and candle-lighting. The isolated, scenic location of the church was also a factor in attracting visitors, and played a role in pilgrims' perception of the site as sacred.

A 2013–2016 study at the shrine analysed the content of prayers left by visitors, primarily in the form of prayer cards and notes in a prayer-request book. The prayers indicated that visitors to the shrine come from diverse religious backgrounds, including Franciscan nuns, members of a new religious group, Baptists, Methodists, and Russian Orthodox. Many of the prayers referenced cancer, reflecting the influence of the cancer ministry. Other themes found in the prayers include Melangell herself, the sanctity of the location, nature, and womanhood.

== Archaeological excavations ==
In 1958 the cell-y-bedd was partially excavated during reconstruction of the shrine, during which the wooden floor was removed. Below was a cobblestone floor, with a large slab set into it. Underneath the slab was a grave containing pebbles, soil, and fragments of bone. The footings of the medieval apse were also discovered under the walls. Between 1989 and 1994, excavation was undertaken in the cell-y-bedd, in the chancel and nave, and to the north of the church.

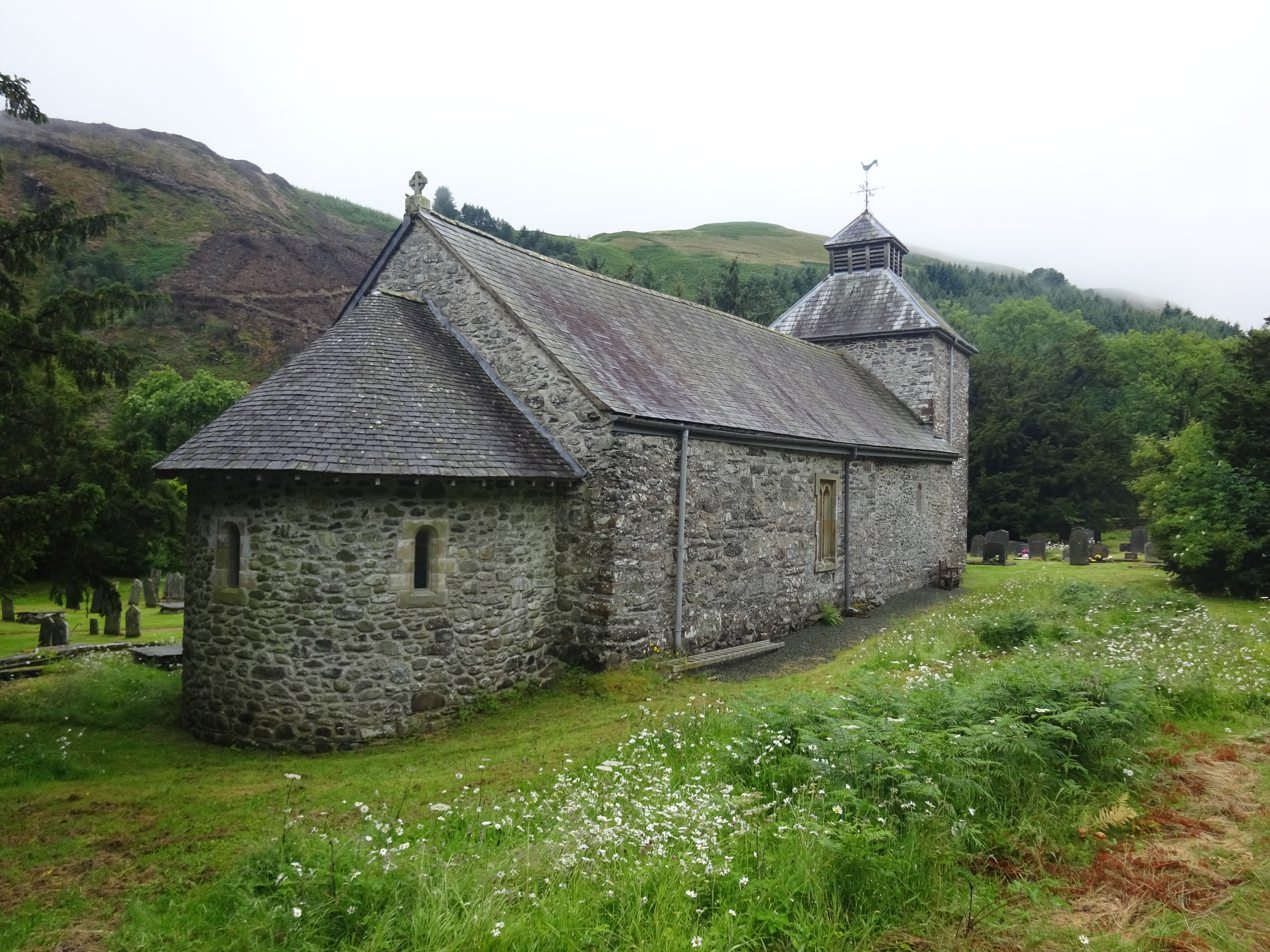
Apse and north wall of the church

The 1989–1994 excavations in the cell-y-bedd revealed prehistoric activity at the site. Several small pits filled with loam were discovered with high concentrations of charcoal and bone fragments, indicating cremation burial. Radiocarbon dating of two of the pits dated the deposits to the Middle Bronze Age. The pits were found underneath several layers of medieval flooring within the subsoil. Twenty-nine pits in total were found in the vicinity of the apse, and many of them contained human bone fragments. Underneath the walls of the cell-y-bedd were the footings of the medieval apse wall, which was semicircular and contemporary with the east wall of the chancel. A large early medieval stone slab, possibly a grave or a footing of the medieval apse, was also identified underneath the floor, as was a posthole cutting through multiple layers of flooring. To the east of the cell-y-bedd, 13 graves were identified, three of which predated the structure and several of which had skeletal remains. A portion of a charnel deposit to the south of the cell-y-bedd was also found, containing disarticulated human skeletons.

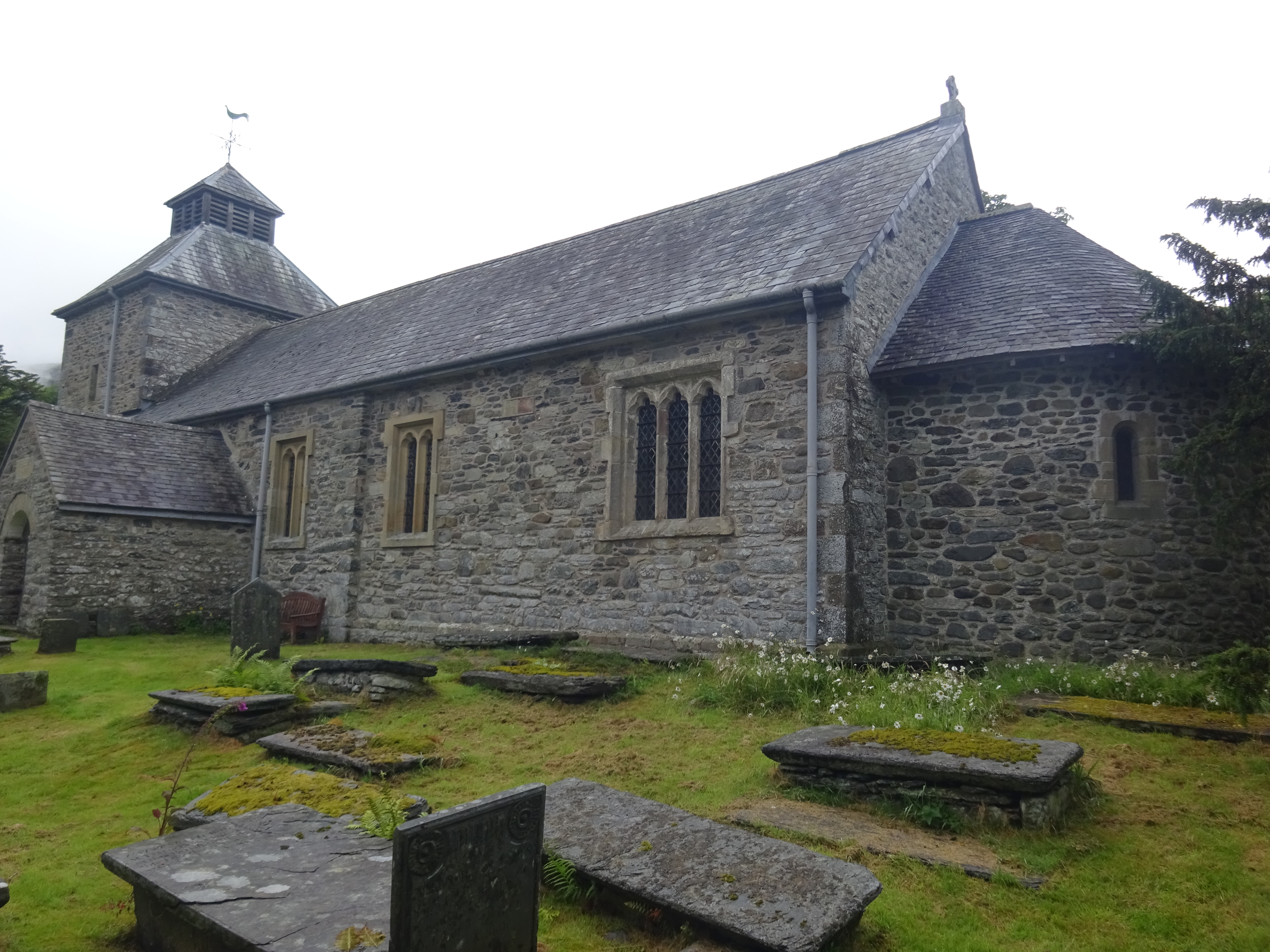
The south side of the church and the apse

Limited excavation was also undertaken in the church interior, and further evidence of Middle Bronze Age burial activity was discovered. Seven pits were found under the west end of the church, similar to those at the east end. They were filled with charcoaly soil, and some of them had charred plant matter and human remains. A posthole was also identified. Pieces of Bronze Age pottery were discovered underneath the west end of the church; nine sherds were recovered in total. Seven of the sherds comprised the upper part of a large bucket urn; the bucket and barrel urns of Wales are regarded as equivalents to the pottery of the Deverel–Rimbury tradition of England. Early medieval burial activity was also uncovered, dating to before the construction of the current church in the 12th century. At least 16 burials underneath the church, dating from the building of the church to the 18th century, were identified. Sherds of green-glazed medieval pottery, a dark red glass bead similar to pre-Saxon beads, and a carved stone tool were also recovered. A fragment of a Romanesque candlestick with a stylised dragon head and beadwork was also found, probably dating from the 12th century.

The north wall of the church was excavated, which dated it largely to the 12th century. Excavation in the north of the churchyard uncovered 25 or 26 possible graves, all of which were previously unknown. These graves are of uncertain date, but probably date to before the 16th century. Some graves had edging stones on top of them, and one had a dense layer of white quartz pebbles at its surface. No coffins were found among the graves, and only a few had skeletal remains. A circular pit filled with charcoaly soil and a possible posthole, both potentially prehistoric, were also identified. When contaminated (Note: The soil was highly salinic after salt was used to create a winter scene during the production of a film, which had negative effects on the yew trees.) topsoil was removed from the east of the churchyard in 1987, several previously unknown graves laid with cobblestone were discovered, dating from the mid-18th to the mid-19th centuries.

== Shrine ==
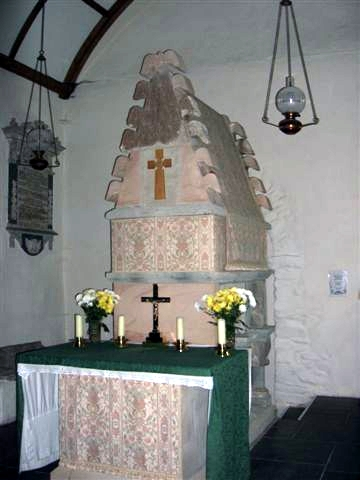
Shrine of Saint Melangell

The shrine of Melangell is regarded as the oldest surviving Romanesque shrine in northern Europe. It is a reconstructed version of the 12th-century original, built out of fragments found in and around the church. Although the date of its demolition is unknown, it probably would have been threatened during the Reformation period, like many other shrines in England and Wales. Parts of the dismantled shrine were incorporated into the 17th-century lychgate and in the walls of the church when it was renovated in the 17th and 18th centuries. The fragments were noted by Thomas Pennant and John Parker, but were thought to be remnants of an earlier church until Worthington George Smith identified them as a former shrine in 1894. In 1958, the shrine was reconstructed in the cell-y-bedd by the architect R. B. Heaton, based on a study by Ralegh Radford and incorporating an altar and reliquary. The 1958 shrine was dismantled in 1989 and restored in 1991 in the chancel, based on a proposal by Radford and W. J. Hemp.

The shrine is built of fragments of pinkish-grey and yellowish-grey sandstone, many of which are heavily weathered. Some of the fragments were not used in the 1991 reconstruction and were preserved separately. Several fragments have traces of limewash and dark red paint.

The primary evidence for what the shrine originally looked like is the surviving stone fragments, as there are no depictions of the shrine before its dismantlement, nor any similar shrines of the same period to compare. The design motifs of the shrine, such as the "willow" and "half-pear" leaves on the running half-palmette, suggest an Irish connection to Pennant Melangell due to their similarity to Celtic motifs found in Ireland. The steep gable design of Melangell's shrine was also common for portable reliquaries in medieval Ireland. The foliage designs may represent the bramble bush where Prince Brochwel found Melangell and the hare.

== Architecture ==
The church has a single nave, with a chancel and apse at the east end, and a tower at the west end. The building is constructed of waterworn pebbles, larger slabs of sedimentary rock, and blocks of shale; different portions of the church date to varying periods, from the 12th to the 20th centuries. The main roof is of slate with stone ridge tiles, and the roof of the porch is black ceramic tile. The 19th-century square tower has a pyramidal roof topped by a short timber belfry. The current bell is dated to 1918 and was made by the Taylors of Loughborough.

=== Cell-y-bedd ===
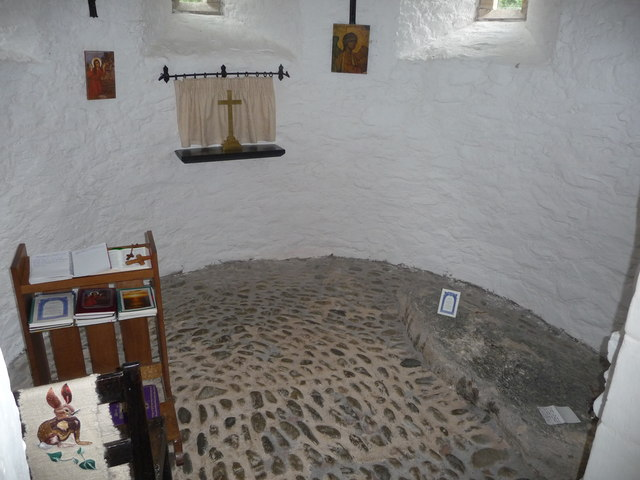
Interior of the apse, with the grave slab on the right

The cell-y-bedd, or apse, may have been built to house the relics of Melangell, and is located at the east end of the church. It is traditionally thought to have been built over Melangell's grave. A stone slab marks the site of her putative grave; Melangell's relics may have been enshrined there for pilgrims to venerate. It may have been introduced in the 18th century to mark the grave, as it has different dimensions to the stone settings it rests on.

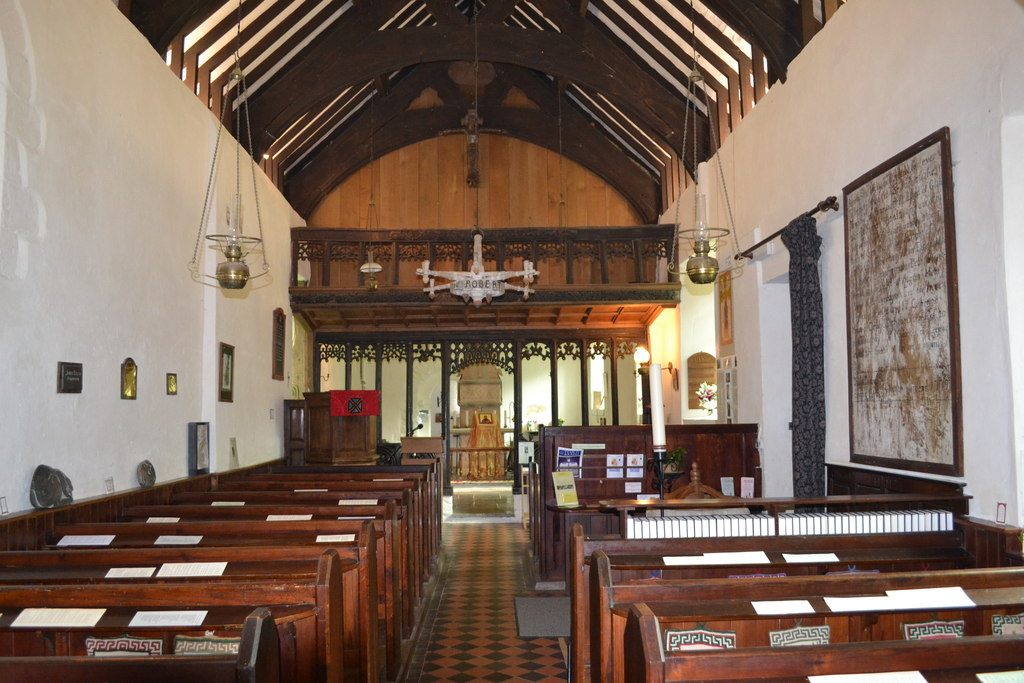
Interior of the church, facing the shrine

Most of the structure was built in 1751 to replace the medieval apse and consisted of a small, irregular rectangular room with a single window and a fireplace. It was constructed out of shale slabs and boulders, and had multiple blocked-up doorways and patched holes from renovations and repairs over the centuries. The interior walls were plastered and limewashed.

The original cell-y-bedd was demolished in 1989 and replaced with the current apse. The new apse, built out of local rounded boulders, was constructed to be as close to the original 12th-century apse as possible. A new concrete floor with a cobbled surface was also laid, and the grave slab was laid on top. The apse has three rounded windows in a 12th-century style.

=== Interior ===
Most of the interior furnishings of St Melangell's Church are common for a remote parish church, and include several historic objects: a 12th-century baptismal font, a 17th-century chest, an 18th-century chalice, an early 18th-century pulpit, an 18th-century candelabrum, and a large whale rib of uncertain purpose and provenance, which may have been part of a harp. The whale rib is sometimes called Asen y gawres (the Giantess' rib) or Asen Melangell (Melangell's rib).

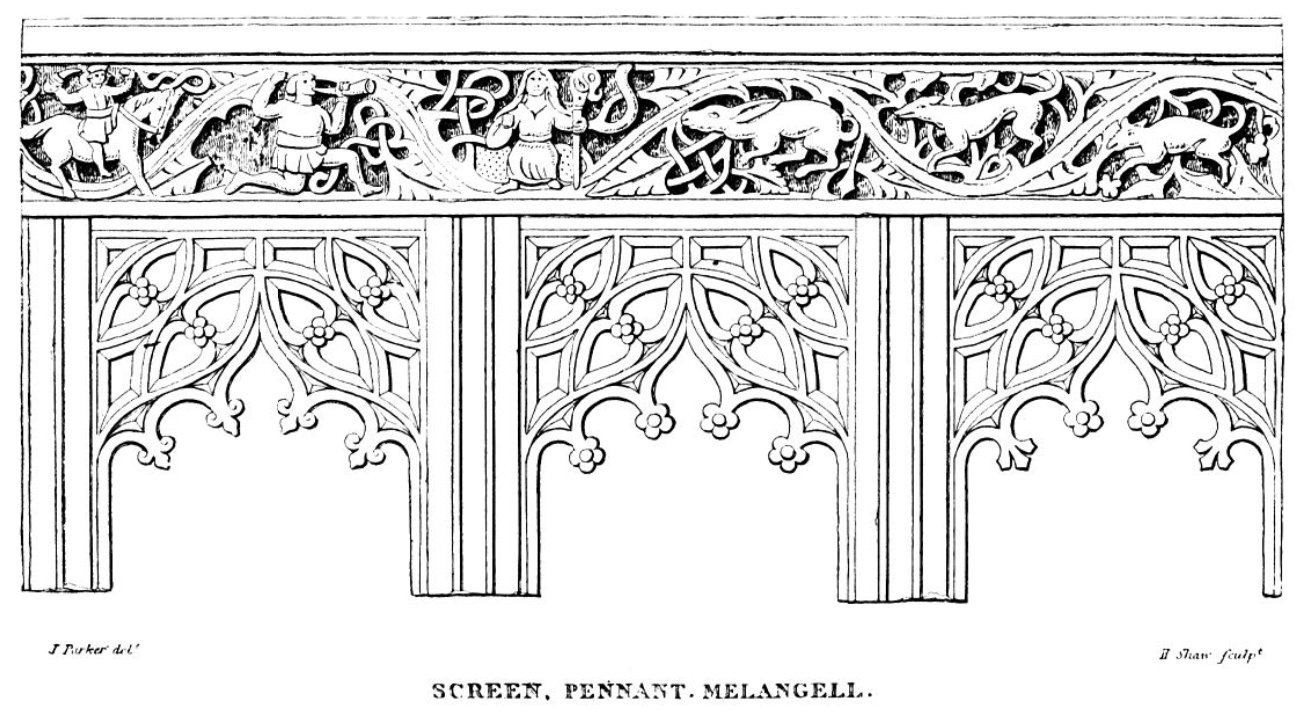
Engraving of the rood screen after a drawing by John Parker

The church has had paintings and wall decorations throughout its history, not all of which have survived. The earliest known are traces of floral and geometric patterns, mostly dating to the 13th century. Several 17th-century wall inscriptions were found during the restorations of 1876–1877, none of which survive. A Stuart coat of arms was also discovered, dating to the post-Restoration period; it was painted over with a Hanoverian coat of arms in the 18th century, which was later plastered over. Above the altar was a 1791 reredos featuring the Ten Commandments, the Apostles' Creed, and the Lord's Prayer, all in Welsh and decorated with cherubs; this painting was later conserved and moved to the tympanum. An 1886 copy on wood was located on the altar, which covered and protected the original from damage. Gothic revival stencilled designs were also added around the chancel in the 19th century.

==== Rood screen ====
The carved wooden rood screen dates to the late 15th century, and contains the earliest surviving depiction of Melangell and the hare. Much of the original screen has been lost, but what survived was restored and reunited with parts of the loft balcony in the 1989–1992 work. The carvings on the rood screen depict Prince Brochwel on horseback, a huntsman, Melangell, the hare, and two hunting dogs within a foliated running border. Traces of red, pink, yellow, brown, black, and blue paint have been found on the screen and loft. Melangell is depicted as an abbess, with a veil and crosier.

In 1848 the Welsh priest and artist John Parker described the carvings as "decidedly grotesque, and verging on the ludicrous," but also wrote that the "cleverness and ingenuity with which the story is told, in spite of the trammels imposed upon the artist by the requirements of the running border, are deserving of remark." Below the carving of Melangell are cornices featuring acorns and oak leaves. The screen is carved out of solid oak wood, with no attached pieces.

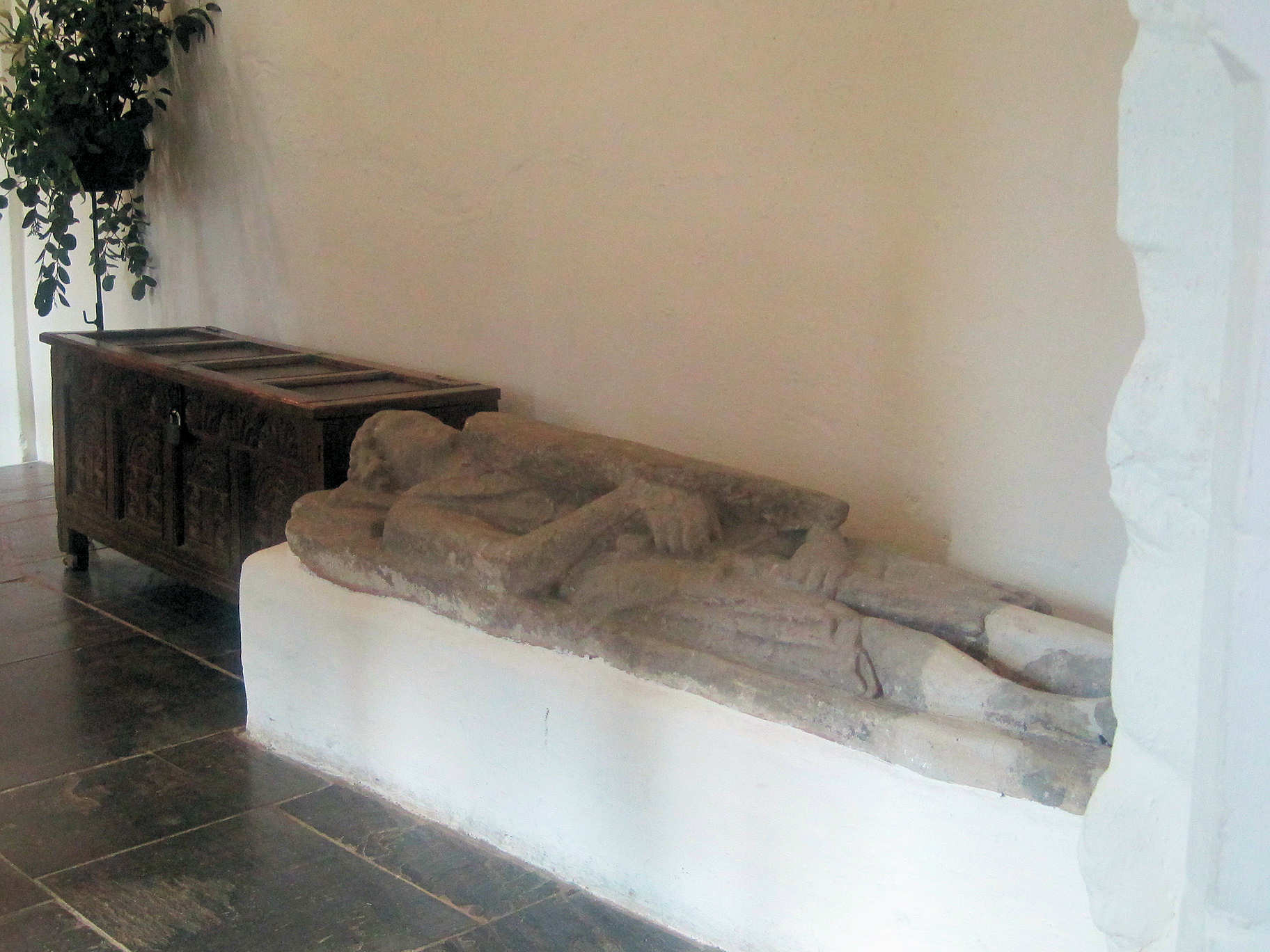
Male effigy, sometimes identified as the tomb of Iorwerth Drwyndwn

==== Effigies ====
The chancel has two 14th-century effigies on either side, one male and one female, the original locations of which are unknown. Both were moved into the church in 1876 and placed against the west wall, before which the male effigy was in the churchyard and the female effigy was unaccounted for.

The male effigy depicts a young man with a sword and shield, lying with his head resting on cushions, and an animal (possibly a wolf) beneath his feet. The inscription around the edge of the shield is now illegible and the identity of the man unknown, but historically he has been identified as the 12th-century nobleman Iorwerth Drwyndwn. A contributor to the Welsh archaeological journal Archaeologia Cambrensis wrote in 1877 that the male effigy may actually represent a member of Rhirid Flaidd's family, Iorwerth of Penllyn, due to the wolf on his shield, a symbol of the family. Likewise, the female effigy may depict Iorwerth of Penllyn's wife Gwerfyl. The male effigy has sustained damage from knife-sharpening and cutting of initials over time. Thomas Jones, an 18th-century vicar of Pennant Melangell known for his eccentricity, supposedly attacked the effigy's legs with a stone during an outburst, causing lasting damage.

The female effigy is traditionally thought to depict Melangell and has been venerated as such, but this is uncertain. The figure wears a long gown and a square headdress characteristic of the late 14th century, with a lion at her feet and two animals at either side. The animals may be hares, in which case the effigy would probably be a cult figure of Melangell, similar to those found in St Pabo, Llanbabo, and St Iestyn, Llaniestyn, in Anglesey. The earliest known identification of the effigy as Melangell comes from Thomas Pennant's Tours in Wales in 1773. Like the male effigy, it has been damaged by sharpening of knives, and is broken in two parts.

== Churchyard ==
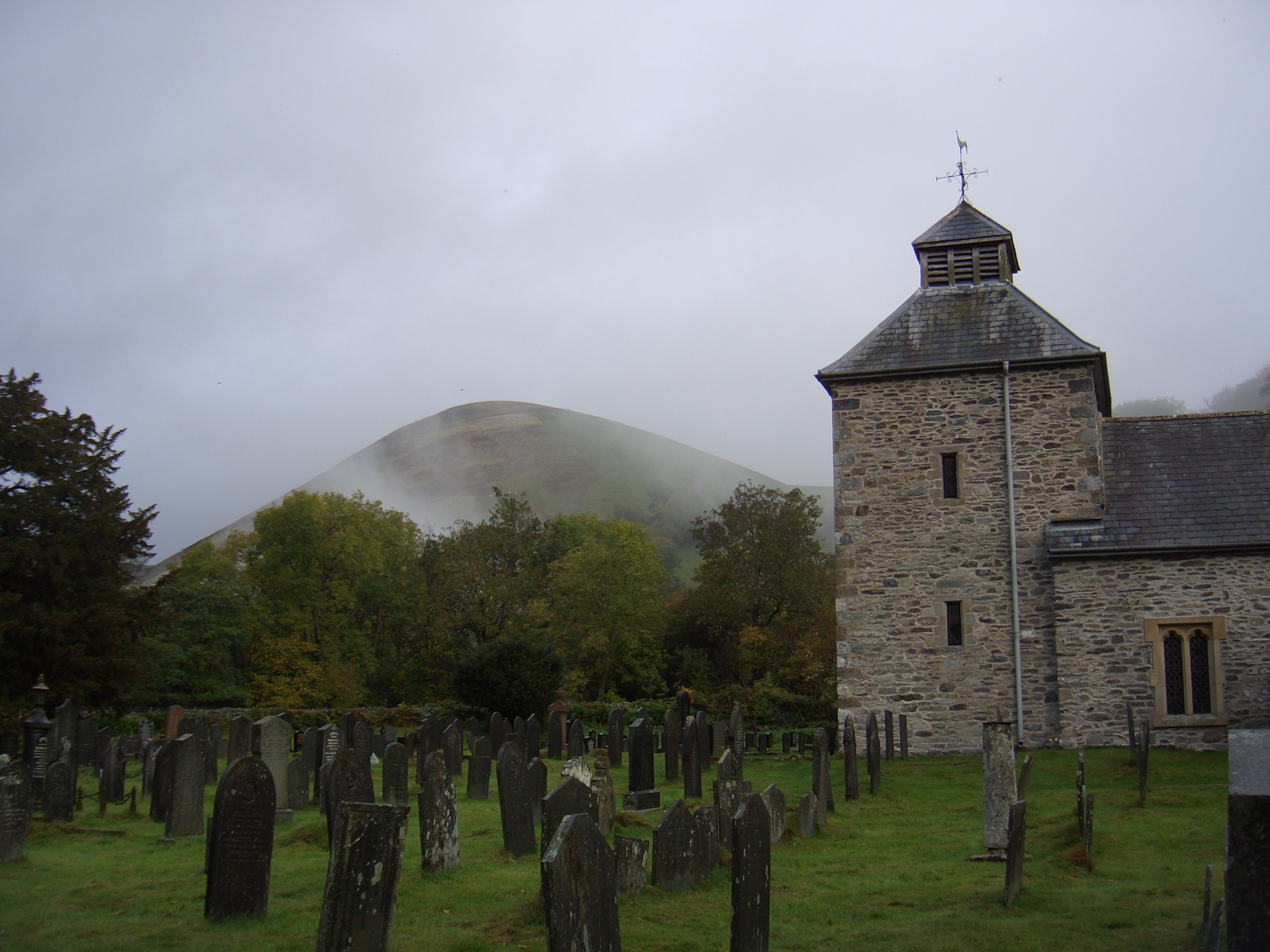
The tower and churchyard

The churchyard of Pennant Melangell is roughly circular and surrounded by a stone wall, which is probably much older than the earliest references to it in the 18th century. A detailed survey of the churchyard was undertaken in 1986, which catalogued the gravestones, trees, mounds, and kerbs. Records were made for each gravestone, including photographs, burial record information, and the materials and condition of the stone. The oldest marked graves in the churchyard are located in the southeast, near the chancel and apse; the earliest memorial stone is dated to 1619. There are no graves visible in the north of the churchyard, where burial was less favoured by locals, although excavation revealed significant burial activity in the north churchyard before the 17th century. Since burial records began in 1680, around 1,000 burials have been recorded, the vast majority of which are unmarked. Another 1,000–2,000 unmarked graves from as early as the 12th century are believed to be located in the churchyard as well, including those of pilgrims from elsewhere. Three marked graves, registered by the Commonwealth War Graves Commission, are those of soldiers who died serving in World War I. The 20th-century Welsh harpist Nansi Richards was buried in the churchyard.

The base of a medieval stone cross, possibly moved from next to the lychgate, lies among the gravestones and is used as the base for a sundial. North of the church is a mound, which may have been a preaching mound associated with the cult of Saint Germanus. There are seven yews in the churchyard; the largest yew is 3.5 metres in diameter. The majority are believed to be considerably older than the first written mentions of them in the 18th century.

The lychgate, likely to be of the 16th or 17th century, previously contained fragments of the original shrine, but the stones were removed in 1958. The gate has corbelled arches on both sides, and interior stone seats. A fragment of an inscription, probably contemporary with the building of the gate, survives. Most of the inscription has been lost, but the text was recorded several times in the parish records of the 18th century, and read:

Welsh (original)

Tuedda 'n bur at Weddi
dy Galon Gwylia wrth addoli,
A Duw yn unig Daioni
yma 'n dda, anrhydedda di.

Translation:
English

Incline thyself in purity to Prayer,
beware of thy Heart while worshipping,
and God, the only Goodness
here, honour well.

Historically the churchyard served several secular purposes, particularly as a yard for games and festivals. The north churchyard was used for ball games into the 19th century, which may explain the lack of graves in the area and windows on the north wall of the church. Two former cockpits have been documented, which were probably used until the 19th century, although neither remain. Plays were also performed in the churchyard, including by the 18th-century poet Twm o'r Nant, who was said to be the last to perform in an interlude at Pennant.

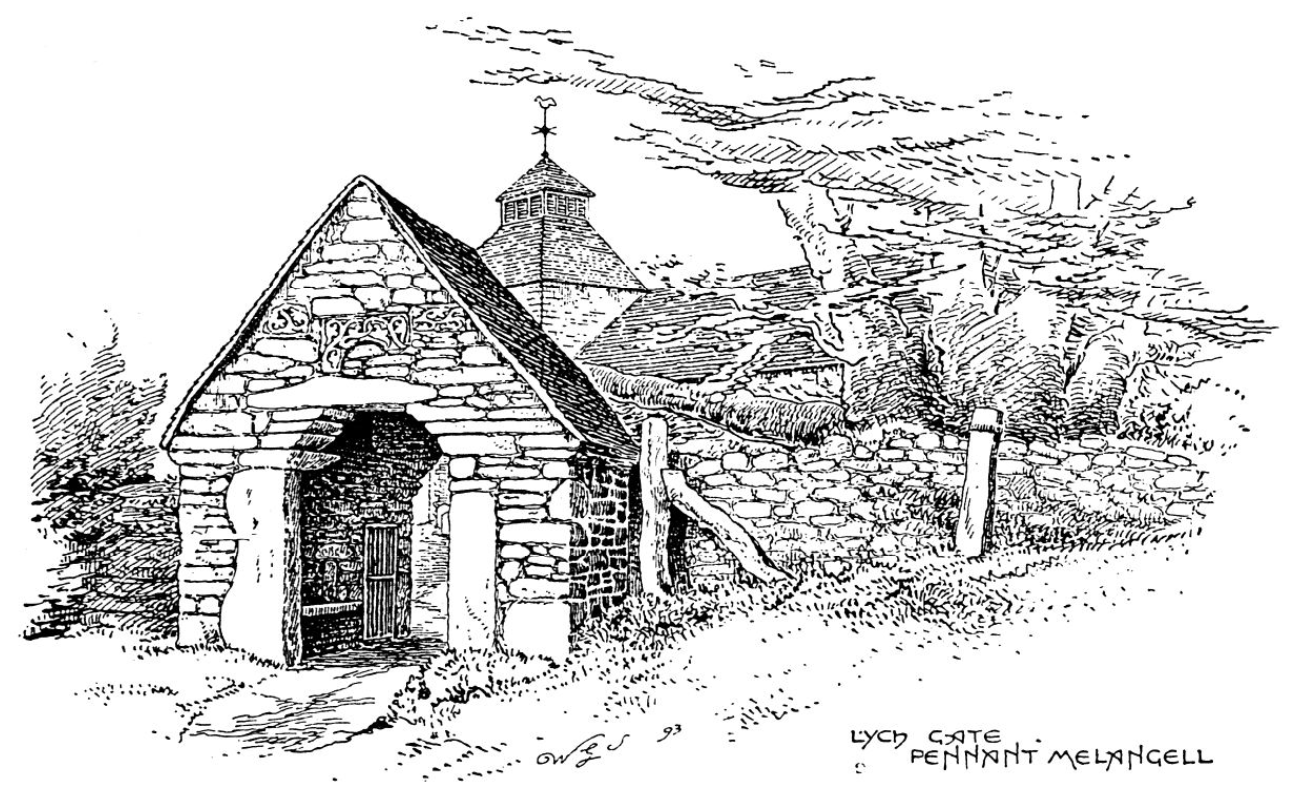
1893 illustration by W. G. Smith of the lychgate, showing carved stones of the dismantled shrine incorporated into the arch

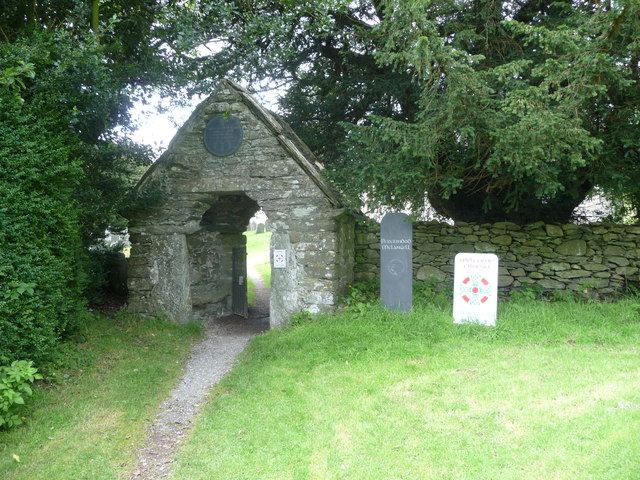
The lychgate, pictured in 2012
