= Historia Divae Monacellae =

Latin hagiography of Saint Melangell

The Historia Divae Monacellae is the medieval Latin hagiography of Melangell (Latin: Monacella), an early medieval Welsh saint whose cult is centred at St Melangell's Church in the former village of Pennant Melangell. The Historia chronicles the legendary life of Melangell, a consecrated virgin and hermit in the forest of Powys, and her encounter with a prince who grants her land as a sanctuary after she supernaturally protected a hare from his hunting dogs. She later established female monastics in the area.

The Historia's authorship is subject to debate, but it was probably composed at some point in the late Middle Ages in or near Pennant Melangell, and was based on previous literature and local folklore. Several manuscripts survive, three of which are complete. The Historia was first printed in 1848. Various interpretations of the Historia have been put forth, such as it being written to defend Pennant Melangell's sanctuary rights in a time when Welsh churches were being threatened by local rulers. Others have analysed the Historia as a cautionary tale for men seeking to harm virgins, or as representing the anchoritic tradition.

== Synopsis ==
A prince of Powys and Earl of Chester named Brochwel Ysgithrog, while on a hunting trip to Pennant in AD 604, (Note: The identification of this Brochwel with Brochwel Ysgithrog is unlikely to be historical, as with the listings of his successors later in the text. Likewise, the Historia gives a date of 604, but this date is suspect due to its likely origin in Bede's Historia Ecclesiastica.) was pursuing a hare with his dogs. He came upon a large bramble, in which a virgin was praying with the hare under her hem. Brochwel urged his dogs to catch the hare, but they retreated in fear. He asked the virgin how long she had lived on his land and where she came from, and she replied that she was a princess of an Irish kingdom called Iowchel (Note: Iowchel is not a known historical kingdom, but may be an anachronistic reference to Youghal, a town founded in the 13th century in County Cork.) and had lived at Pennant alone as a consecrated virgin for 15 years after fleeing an arranged marriage.

After learning Melangell's background, Brochwel granted her the land she was living on, and declared it a perpetual sanctuary and promised protection from hunters. Melangell lived in solitude at Pennant for another 37 years, and the wild hares were tame to her, even performing intercessory miracles. Brochwel's successors continued to affirm the right of sanctuary at Pennant, and Melangell established female monastics in the area. After Melangell's death, someone named Elise attempted to violate the virgins, and died suddenly and wretchedly.

== Textual history ==
The Historia is the oldest and most thorough account of Melangell's life and the founding of Pennant Melangell. It is a rare example of a Latin hagiography for a female Welsh saint; Winifred is the only other female Welsh saint attested in pre-Reformation sources with surviving Latin hagiography.

The historian Huw Pryce argues that the text was composed in or near Pennant Melangell and undoubtedly derives from local tradition; the account of hares performing miracles may reflect popular folklore. The early-15th-century female effigy, possibly depicting Melangell, and the late-15th-century rood screen at St Melangell's Church illustrating Melangell and the hare may be indicative of the legend predating the composition of the Historia. The identification of Melangell's home as Iowchel, mentions of free abbots at Pennant Melangell, and the otherwise-unattested names Tambryd, Curmylk, and Durres claudus suggest that the author had access to local sources and information. Pryce also contends that the author drew on earlier literature, such as the Historia Regum Britanniae by Geoffrey of Monmouth; the character of Brochwel is probably derived from Brochfael, described as the earl of Chester by Geoffrey, and later identified with Brochwel Ysgithrog by Welsh translators of Geoffrey. Pryce also suggests familiarity with Bede due to the setting of AD 604, a year present in the Historia Ecclesiastica, and Gerald of Wales due to the identification of Pengwern with Shrewsbury.

The historian David Stephenson, building upon Pryce's suggestion that the Historia is derived from an earlier text, identifies the character of Elise as Elise ap Madog, a son of the 12th-century king of Powys Madog ap Maredudd. Elise ap Madog was a prominent figure in late 12th-century and early 13th-century Powys and a benefactor to the Cistercians, who had a reputation for threatening ecclesiastical neighbors' land. Elise ap Madog may have been viewed as a threat by older ecclesiastical foundations in Powys, and the sudden death of Elise in the Historia may be an allegory for Elise ap Madog being stripped of his lands by Llywelyn ab Iorwerth.

Ralegh Radford and W. J. Hemp argued in 1959 that the Historia was mostly written in the 14th or 15th century, and was glossed and added to by antiquarians after the Reformation. According to Pryce, the prose style and references to the College of St Chad in Shrewsbury, which was dissolved in 1548, point to a pre-Reformation date, while the use of the word divus to describe Melangell indicates that it was composed no earlier than the late 15th century.

Melangell's cult was popular in Wales until the Reformation, when it was suppressed. Oral tradition about Melangell was preserved at Pennant through the post-Reformation period, and recorded by Thomas Price in the 17th century and Thomas Pennant in the 18th century; the latter's account of her legend closely matched that of the Historia. Folklore surrounding Melangell evolved in the 19th and 20th centuries, conflating other legends with Melangell's and diverging from the Historia's account.

=== Manuscripts ===
The original manuscript of the Historia has been lost, but Pryce lists five surviving manuscript copies dating from the 16th to the 19th centuries. Three of the manuscripts are complete, while the two earliest ones are fragmentary. The Historia was first printed in 1848, based on a now-lost 17th-century manuscript. The text of each transcription of the Historia is slightly different, although it is evident that all surviving versions originate with a single source text. The discrepancies between the manuscripts are not substantive, but probably derive from a combination of scribal error and editorial liberties on the part of the scribes. The various antiquarians associated with each of the manuscripts generally lived in or near Powys, which suggests that the Historia was circulating in the area from at least the late 16th century.

Surviving manuscripts of the Historia
Manuscript	Date	Scribe	Location	Notes	Ref.
Cardiff 3.11, p. 1	c. 1561–1580	David Powel	Cardiff Central Library	Incomplete, containing the final third of the text	
Harley MS 2059, fo. 111	Late 16th–early 17th century	Laurence Bostock	British Library	Incomplete due to damage	
NLW 3108B, fos. 76–77	Late 17th century	Thomas Sebastian Price	National Library of Wales		
NLW 1506C, part iii, pp. 38–41	c. 1700	Unidentified	National Library of Wales	Copied from Price's manuscript	
NLW 35B	Before 1759	John Owen	National Library of Wales	Incomplete copy of a transcript by William Morris. (Note: NLW 35B is not mentioned in Pryce 1994.)	
NLW 1641B i, pp. 63–68	Late 18th–early 19th century	Gwallter Mechain	National Library of Wales		

== Thematic analysis ==
While the Historia provides no contemporary evidence of Melangell's existence, it provides insight into her highly localised cult in the Middle Ages, which may have existed for centuries prior to written testimony. Pryce analyses the purpose of the Historia as affirming the sanctuary status of Pennant Melangell. The theme of sanctuary is also found in other medieval Latin Lives, such as those of Cadoc and David, and the right of sanctuary was first defined in Welsh law in the late 12th century. The Historia may have been partially derived from a 13th-century text seeking to defend Welsh churches' right of sanctuary, at a time when local princes were attempting to curb it. Welsh churches were again seeking confirmations of their sanctuary rights in the 15th century due to violations by local rulers, and the Historia may have been composed in response to this. Pryce also suggests that the text was not written to promote Melangell's ecclesiastical cult, as it makes no mention of her relics, but rather in the interests of the lay abbots of Pennant Melangell.

According to Jane Cartwright, a professor at University of Wales Trinity Saint David, a moral lesson of the Historia is that divine retribution awaits those who attempt to violate consecrated virgins. Cartwright compares the legend of Melangell to that of Winifred and Eluned, as well as other female Welsh saints who were subject to sexual violence while Melangell and her nuns were spared. Cartwright also compares Melangell's hagiography to Welsh legends about Mary Magdalene, both of whom spend long periods as hermits in the woods. In both traditions, men who approach them are struck by their holiness. While Cartwright analyses Melangell as a nun, the historian Liz Herbert McAvoy argues that the Historia reflects the anchoritic tradition and she compares Melangell to Christina of Markyate, an English anchoress who also fled an arranged marriage.
