= Llanbabo =

Village in Anglesey, Wales

Coordinates: 53.350349°N 4.442792°W

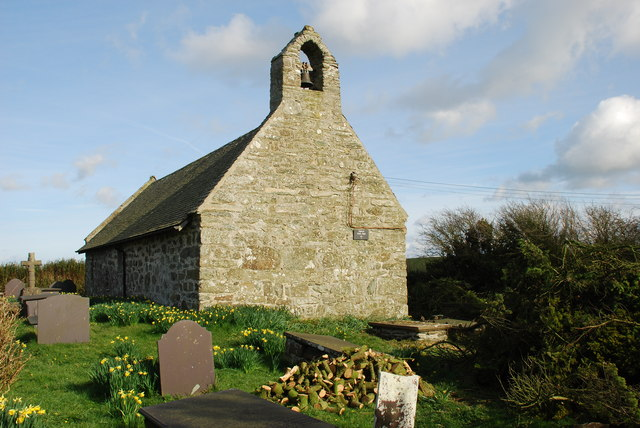

- Location within Anglesey
- OS grid reference: SH375865
- Community: Tref Alaw
- Principal area: Anglesey
- Preserved county: Gwynedd
- Country: Wales
- Sovereign state: United Kingdom
- Postcode district: LL66
- Police: North Wales
- Fire: North Wales
- Ambulance: Welsh
- UK Parliament: Ynys Môn
- Senedd Cymru – Welsh Parliament: Bangor Conwy Môn

Llanbabo (meaning: Church of Pabo) is a small village two miles north west of Llannerch-y-medd in Anglesey, Wales. It lies within the community of Tref Alaw. Until 1984 Llanbabo was a community itself.

The ancient church of St Pabo, Llanbabo is dedicated to Saint Pabo: possibly Pabo Post Prydain, one of the leaders among the Britons of the Hen Ogledd following the withdrawal of the Roman legions. He is said to have founded a church here in 460, upon the site of which the present one is built, and to have been buried here along with his daughters. A 14th-century effigy of Pabo, along with the words HIC JACET PABO POST PRUD CORPORS ... TE ... PRIMA, is found on a stone in the church.

Llyn Alaw is nearby.
