= Llwyn Bryn-Dinas =

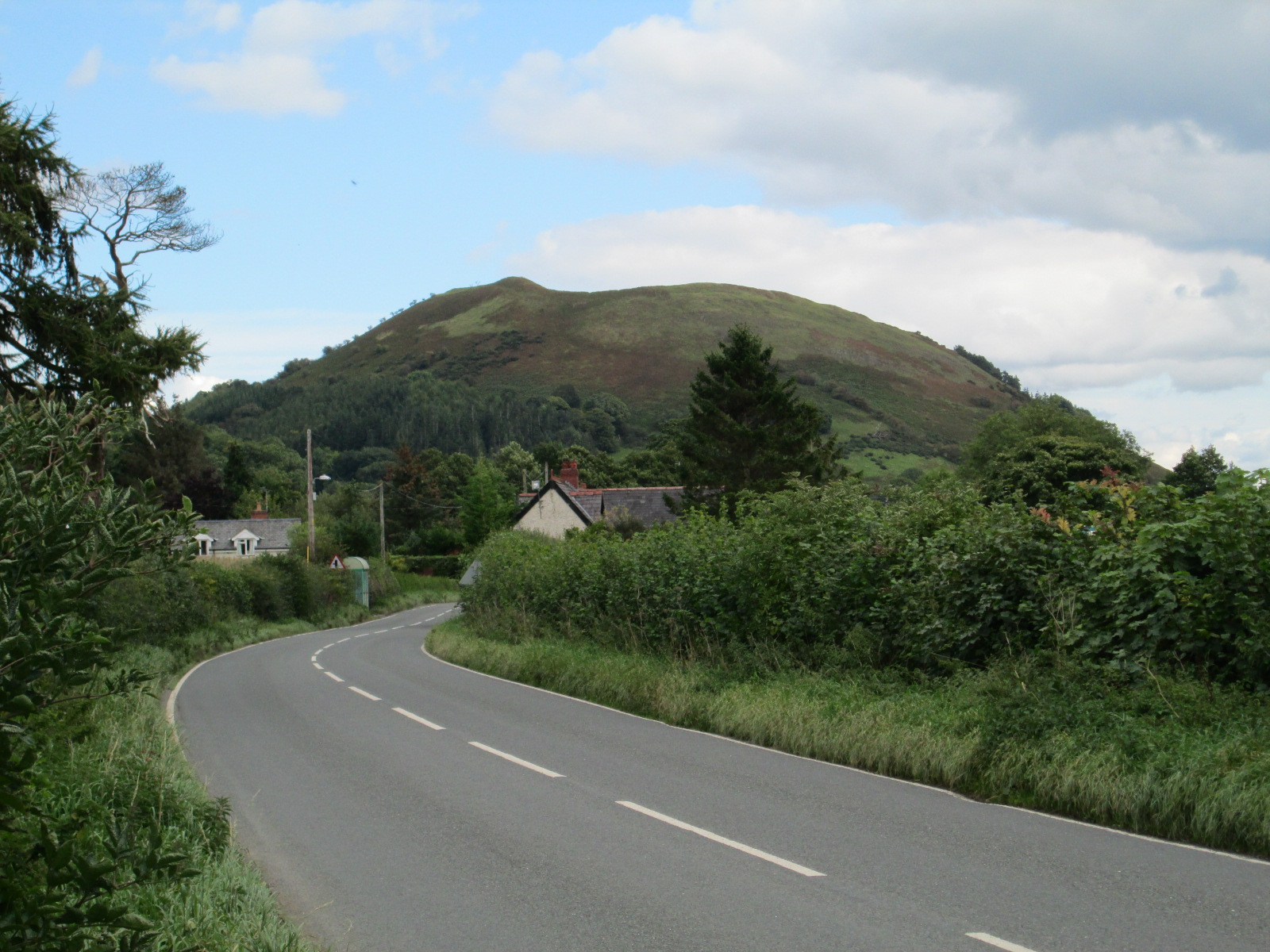
- Llwyn Bryn-Dinas from the west

- Location within Powys
- 52°48′50″N 3°13′45″W
- Type: Hillfort
- Periods: Bronze Age; Iron Age
- Location: Near Llangedwyn, Wales
- OS grid reference: SJ 172 247

Site notes
- Area: 3 hectares (7.4 acres)

Llwyn Bryn-Dinas is an Iron Age hillfort on the north side of the Tanat valley, about 1 mile (1.6 km) west of the village of Llangedwyn, in Powys, Wales.

== Description ==
The hillfort has a single rampart, about 264 metres (866 ft) north to south and 204 metres (669 ft) east to west, following the contours of a prominent hill. The area is about 3 hectares (7.4 acres). There is a simple inturned entrance on the south-east.

There was excavation in 1983. It was found that the site was first occupied in the late Bronze Age, about the 10th–9th century BC; the defences were enlarged about the 4th–3rd century BC, during the Iron Age. Built into the rear of the rampart was an Iron Age smithy, for bronze-casting and iron-working, probably to serve the requirements of the settlement.

== See also ==
- Hillforts in Britain
- List of Scheduled prehistoric Monuments in Powys (Montgomeryshire)
