= Melangell =

Welsh hermit and patron saint of hares

Saint Melangell
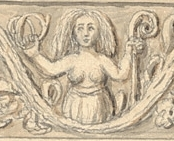
- Sketch of Melangell on the rood screen at Pennant Melangell by John Ingleby, 1795

Abbess, Hermit
- Born: Ireland
- Died: Kingdom of Powys (modern-day Wales)
- Major shrine: Saint Melangell's Church, Pennant Melangell
- Feast: 27 May
- Patronage: Hares

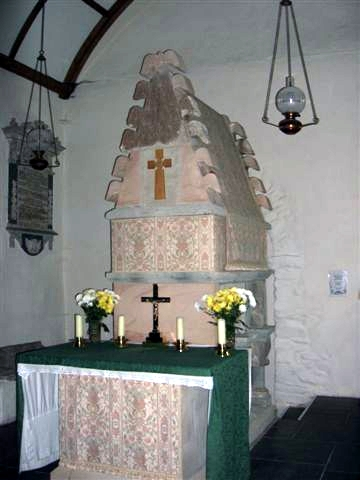
Shrine of St Melangell

Melangell (Welsh: [mɛˈlaŋgɛɬ]), Latin: Monacella, lit. 'little nun') was a Welsh hermit and abbess. She possibly lived in the 7th or 8th century, although the precise dates are uncertain. According to her hagiography, she was originally an Irish princess who fled an arranged marriage and became a consecrated virgin in the wilderness of the Kingdom of Powys. She supernaturally protected a hare from a prince's hunting dogs, and was granted land to found a sanctuary and convent.

Melangell's cult has been closely centred on her 12th-century shrine at St Melangell's Church, Pennant Melangell, which was founded at her grave. The church contains the reconstructed Romanesque shrine to Melangell, which had been dismantled in the aftermath of the Reformation. Since the medieval period, she has been venerated as the patron saint of hares; for many centuries, her association with hares was so strong that locals would not kill a hare in the parish of Pennant Melangell.

== Life ==
Melangell's primary hagiography is the Historia Divae Monacellae, written in the 15th century. The Historia survives in three complete and two incomplete manuscripts, with the earliest dating from the late 16th century, along with one printed copy of a 17th-century manuscript. Melangell's chronology is unknown, with some evidence pointing to the 7th or 8th century. Although the Historia gives a date of 604 AD, this date is suspect due to its likely origin in Bede's Historia Ecclesiastica, which is viewed as historically unreliable by scholars.

Jane Cartwright, a professor at the University of Wales Trinity Saint David, draws a parallel between Melangell's hagiography and Welsh apocryphal legends about Mary Magdalene; both having become penitents deep in the woods and not seeing men for many years. In their respective tales, men who attempt to approach them in the wilderness are struck by their divinity.

=== Hagiographical account ===
The Historia depicts Melangell's life with heavy emphasis on her virginity, placing it as the essence of her sanctity. A lesson that the narrative puts forth is that divine retribution awaits those who attempt to violate a virgin, a moral also found in the hagiography of Winefride and legends surrounding other Welsh virgin martyrs.

According to the Historia, Melangell was a princess of Ireland who fled an arranged marriage. She lived in the wilderness of Powys as a consecrated virgin for fifteen years before being discovered by a prince by the name of Brochwel Ysgithrog. In 604 AD, Brochwel was hunting near Pennant (now Pennant Melangell). His dogs, chasing a hare, led him to a "virgin beautiful in appearance" devoutly praying, with the hare lying safe under the hem of her dress. The prince urged the dogs on, but they retreated and fled from the hare. After hearing Melangell's story, Brochwel donated the land to her, granting perpetual asylum to both the people and animals of the area. Melangell lived for another 37 years in the same place, founding and becoming abbess of a community of nuns. The hares and wild animals behaved towards Melangell as if they were tamed, and miracles were attributed to them. After Melangell's death, someone by the name of Elise attempted to attack the virgins, but "came to an end most wretchedly and perished suddenly."

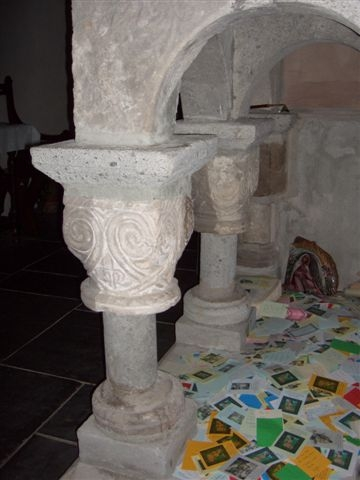
Prayer cards left by devotees at St. Melangell's shrine

== Veneration ==
Melangell and Winefride are the only two Welsh female saints to have Latin hagiographies. Melangell's cult likely flourished locally for centuries before the Historia was written; the Romanesque shrine and church built over her grave indicate that her cult had become established in Pennant Melangell by the 12th century, with her grave being a subject of veneration since before the Norman conquest of Wales.

=== Association with hares ===
Welsh antiquarian Thomas Pennant, in his work Tours in Wales, described Melangell's association with hares, noting that they were nicknamed "St Monacella's lambs" (Welsh: Ŵyn Melangell). Pennant also remarked that "till the last century, so strong a superstition prevaled [sic], that no person would kill a hare in the parish; and even later, when a hare was pursued by dogs, it was firmly believed, that if anyone cried 'God and St. Monacella be with thee,' it was sure to escape." As late as the year 1900, the locals of Pennant Melangell were noted for their refusal to kill hares. Archaeologist Caroline Malim posits a connection between the local veneration of hares (along with other local traditions) and pre-Christian Celtic religion, noting that hares have historically been associated with moon goddesses in mythologies around the world.

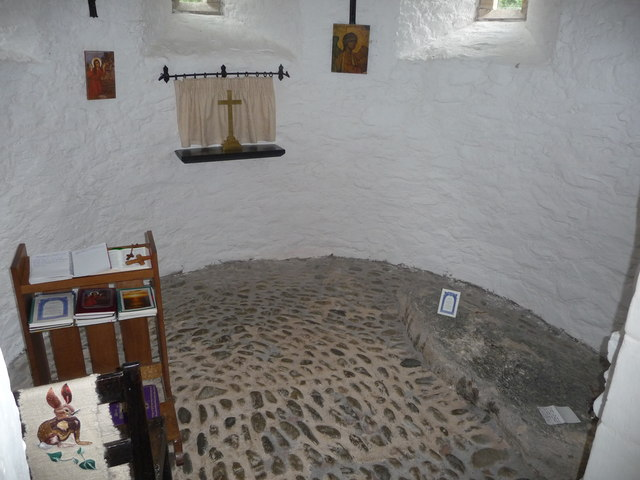
The cell-y-bedd

=== Shrine at Pennant Melangell ===
The settlement of Pennant itself was likely an 8th-century foundation, and the earliest part of the church dates to the 12th century. At the east end of the church, behind the chancel, is a small chamber known as the cell-y-bedd (cell of the grave), which housed the original shrine. The grave was that of Melangell, and it would have served as a reliquary, displaying her remains for visiting pilgrims. The ornate Romanesque carving on the shrine, now located in the chancel, is characteristic of local work of the late 12th century.

In the Reformation period and the centuries afterwards, the cell was turned into a schoolroom and the shrine was dismantled. The sculptured stones of the shrine were reused in the walls of the church and in the lychgate. In 1958, restoration work was undertaken on the church, which included reconstructing the shrine in its original location, the cell-y-bedd. In 1991, the reconstructed shrine was moved to its present location in the chancel.

Melangell is also represented in an effigy traditionally identified as the saint, and in the carved rood screen. The effigy depicts a woman wearing 14th-century clothing, with animals (possibly hares) at her feet. If the animals are indeed hares, then it would likely be a cult effigy to Melangell, similar to those found at St Pabo's Church, Llanbabo, and St Iestyn's Church, Llaniestyn. The late 15th-century rood screen illustrates the story of Melangell and the hare.
