= Pabo Post Prydain =

Brythonic king in Northern Britain

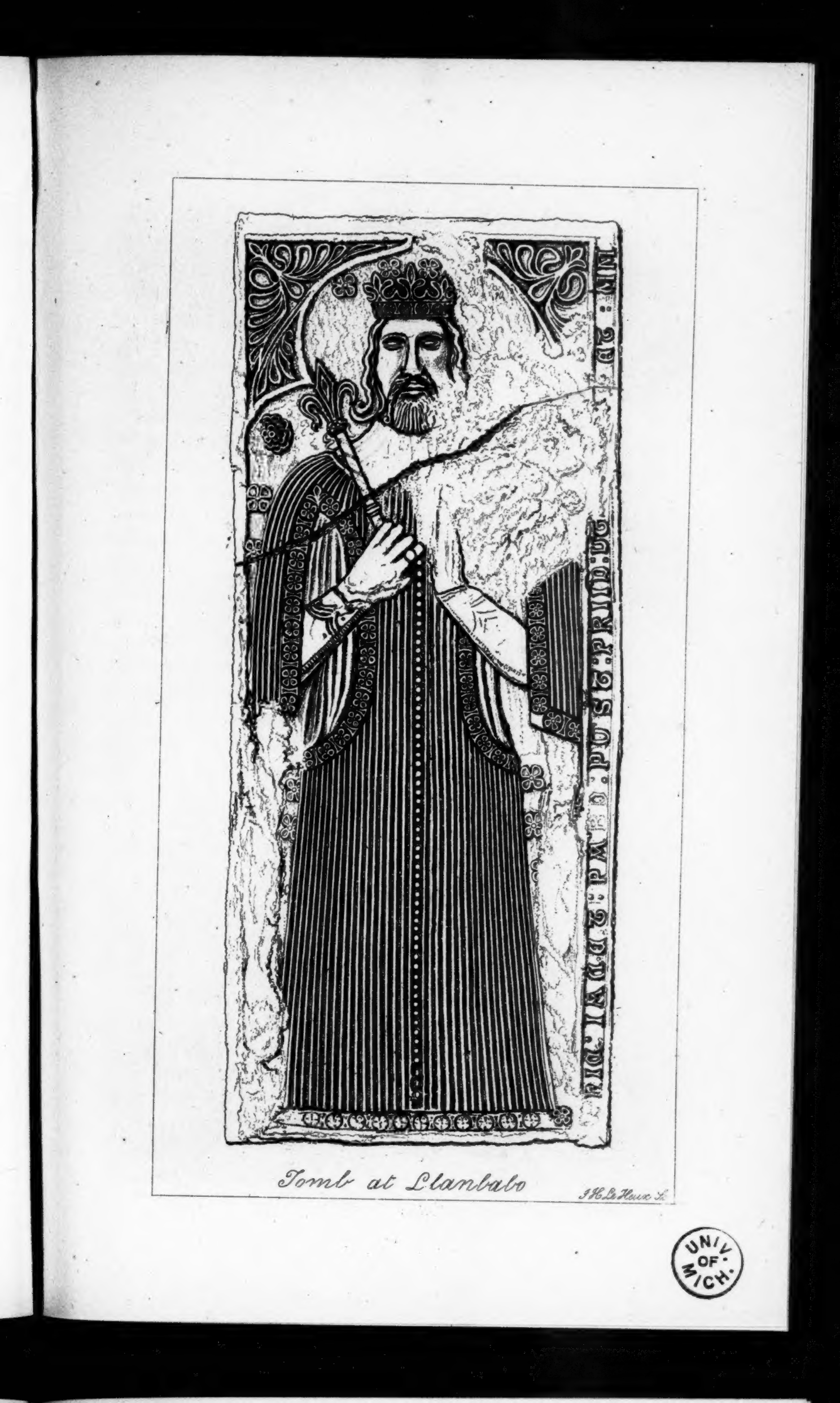
Engraving of memorial stone of Pabo Post Prydain

Pabo Post Prydain (supp. fl. before 500) was a king from the Hen Ogledd or Old North of sub-Roman Britain. According to tradition Pabo "the Pillar of Britain" was driven out of the North in 460 and settled in Anglesey. He is said to have been buried in the area. From the 14th century at least, when a stone cross was erected in the ruler's memory in the abbey's churchyard, Pabo has been identified as its founder, having retired, as many Welsh kings are said to have done, to a heremitic retreat.

== Family ==
The Old Welsh genealogies of British Library, Harleian MS 3859, calls him a son of Cenau son of Coel Hen. Later Welsh genealogies insert two generations by making him son of Arthwys son of Mar son of Cenau son of Coel, though this presents greater chronological problems. The genealogies give him a royal line of descendants as the father of Dunod Fawr, Sawyl Penuchel and Arddun Penasgell, and a saintly one as the grandfather of Deiniol, Asaph and Tysilio.

As to his period, Elis Gruffydd's Chronicle says that his daughter married Maelgwn Gwynedd while an Irish genealogy says that his son "Samuel Chendisel" (the Irish equivalent of Pen-isel) married Deichter, daughter of Muiredach Muinderg, the king of Ulster. Their son Sanctan founded Kilnasantan in County Dublin after travelling to Ireland with his brother Matóc Ailithir. The Irish Liber Hymnorum confirms that Sanctan and Matóc came to Ireland from Britain. Pabo must have been roughly the same age as Muiredach, whose death-date (after a reign of 24 years according to other sources) is given in the Annals of Tigernach as 489.

== Llanbabo ==
A tradition identifies Pabo as the founder of St Pabo's Church, Llanbabo (at Llanbabo, Anglesey). The first author to record it is antiquarian Henry Rowlands (d. 1723), who writes that "Pabo, frequently called Post Prydain, i.e. the Support of Britain, for his great valour against the Picts and Scots, retired here [in Anglesey], and built his church at Llan Babo." A stone cross was erected in the ruler's memory in the abbey's churchyard at the same time Bangor Cathedral was being built. Welsh poet Lewis Morris reports that the memorial cross was discovered there around 1650. The monument, dated to the 14th century, bears the carved image of a king and an accompanying inscription. The inscription is in part illegible but the following reading has been suggested;

Hic iacet Pa[bo] Post Priid Co[nf Gr] … [t]el [i]ma[ginem obtulit]
"Here lies Pabo the Upholder of Britain, Confessor, Gruffudd ab Ithel offered (this) image"

Some scholars argue, in the absence of early evidence, that the tradition is probably spurious though the identity of the historical Pabo who did give his name to the church remains otherwise unknown.
