= Afon Iwrch =

River in Powys, Wales

Coordinates: 52.8100°N 3.2683°W

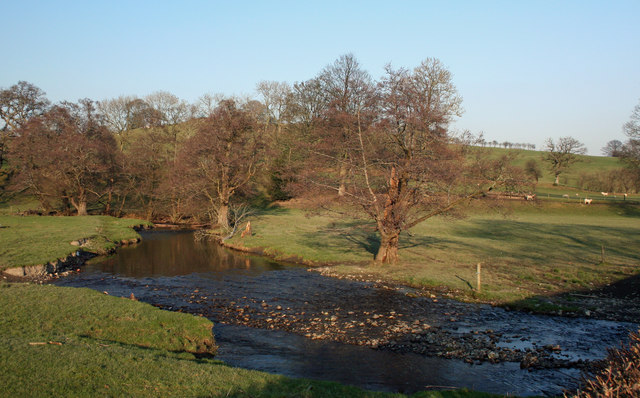
Afon Iwrch at Pont Maesmochnant

The Afon Iwrch is a river near Llanrhaeadr-ym-Mochnant in Powys, Wales. It is a tributary of the River Tanat and is 8.9 miles (14.4 km) in length. Its headwaters lie on the eastern slopes of Cadair Berwyn, the highest peak of the Berwyn range, and the river flows broadly southeastwards to join the River Tanat, itself a tributary of the River Vyrnwy.
