= River Rhaeadr =

Coordinates: 52.81656°N 3.29032°W

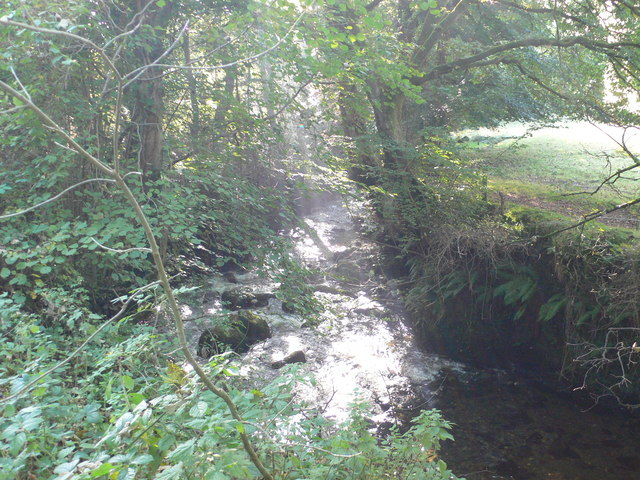
- River Rhaeadr near Llanrhaeadr-ym-Mochnant

Location
- Country: Wales

Physical characteristics
- Source: Pistyll Rhaeadr
- Mouth
  - location: Afon Tanat

The River Rhaeadr (Welsh: Afon Rhaeadr) is a river in Powys, Wales.

It starts at the Pistyll Rhaeadr waterfall a few miles from the village of Llanrhaeadr-ym-Mochnant, where the Afon Disgynfa falls over a 240-foot (73 m) cliff-face, after which the river is known as the Afon Rhaeadr.

Downstream, the Afon Rhaeadr runs into the Afon Tanat.

== See also ==
- River Wye (Afon Gwy)
