= St Pabo's Church =

Coordinates: 53.352899°N 4.438391°W

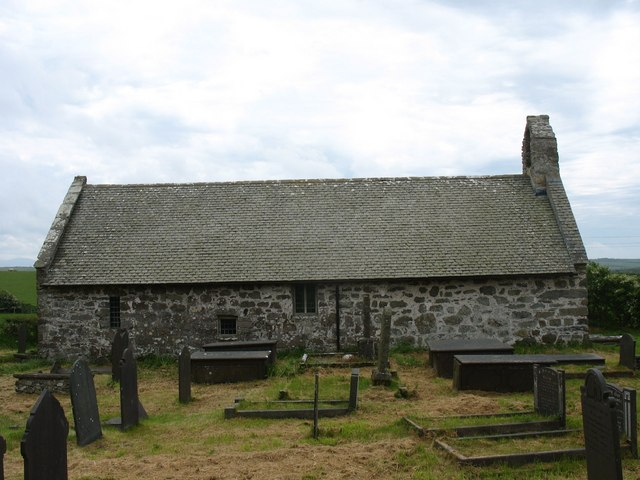
- A view of the north side

- Location in Anglesey
- Location: Llanbabo, Anglesey
- Country: Wales
- Denomination: Church in Wales

History
- Status: Church
- Founded: 5th century (reputedly); 12th century (earliest parts of the building)
- Founder: St Pabo (reputedly)
- Dedication: St Pabo

Architecture
- Functional status: Active (occasional services only)
- Heritage designation: Grade II*
- Designated: 12 May 1970
- Style: Medieval

Specifications
- Length: 45 ft (13.7 m)
- Width: 14 ft 6 in (4.4 m)
- Materials: Rubble masonry, dressed with freestone

Administration
- Province: Province of Wales
- Diocese: Diocese of Bangor
- Archdeaconry: Bangor
- Deanery: Llifon and Talybolion
- Parish: Bodedern with Llanfaethlu

Clergy
- Vicar: Vacant since September 2009

St Pabo's Church is a medieval church in Llanbabo, in Anglesey, North Wales. Much of the church dates to the 12th century, and it is regarded as a good example of a church of its period that has retained many aspects of its original fabric. The church houses a tombstone slab from the 14th century, depicting a king with crown and sceptre, bearing the name of Pabo Post Prydain, the reputed founder of the church. However, there is no evidence that Pabo, a 5th-century prince, lived in the area and the tradition that he founded the church has little supporting basis.

The church is still in use, as part of the Church in Wales, although services are only held here occasionally. It is a Grade II* listed building, a designation given to "particularly important buildings of more than special interest", because it is a medieval church that has been little altered.

== History and location ==
The date of foundation of the church in Llanbabo, Anglesey, is unknown, but it is known that there was a church here before 1254 as it is recorded in the Norwich Valuation of that year. According to tradition, it was founded by Pabo Post Prydain (Pabo the "Pillar of Britain"), a 5th-century prince from North Britain who was driven out in 460 and settled thereafter in Anglesey. He is also said to have been buried in the area. A stone slab gravestone dating from the late 14th century, made from Flintshire sandstone, was found in about 1680: according to the 17th-century Welsh historian Lewis Morris, it was unearthed by a sexton digging a grave in the churchyard. The rectangular slab (from the same workshop as one at Bangor Cathedral and one of St Iestyn at St Iestyn's Church, Llaniestyn, given the similarities between them) has a shallowly engraved full-length image of a bearded man wearing a crown and a loose, pleated tunic over a garment reaching to his wrists. He holds a sceptre in his right hand; his head is on a cushion underneath an arch, and the background is decorated with flowers. The effect is somewhat like a monumental brass in stone; the slab is now displayed vertically inside the church. The inscription, which is incomplete, reads "Hic iacet Pa[bo] Post Priid" (or "Prud") – "Here lies Pabo the Pillar of Britain". Additional letters have been interpreted as denoting the name of the donor of the monument. Apart from this, the tradition linking Pabo to the church is not recorded in writing until the Welsh antiquarian Henry Rowlands in the 18th century, nor is there evidence that Pabo devoted himself to religion or died in Anglesey; accordingly, modern writers suggest that there is no link between him and the church.

The church stands alongside a minor road between Llantrisant and Rhosgoch, near the Llyn Alaw reservoir. It is part of the Church in Wales, although it is only used for services occasionally. It is one of nine churches in the combined parish of Bodedern with Llanfaethlu, and forms part of the deanery of Llifon and Talybolion, within the archdeaconry of Bangor in the Diocese of Bangor. As of 2012, there has been no incumbent priest since September 2009. The village of Llanbabo takes its name from the church: the prefix llan originally meant "enclosure" and then came to mean "church", and "-babo" is a modified form of the saint's name.

== Architecture and fittings ==
The church is built from rubble masonry, dressed with freestone. It measures 45 feet by 14 feet 6 inches (14 by 4.4 metres). The building is largely 12th-century in construction, with the walls and a narrow lancet window in the south wall dating from that time; another window at the east end of the south wall is rectangular and dates from the late 14th or early 15th centuries, with a more modern window in between. The east wall and window, with stone tracery and an ogee-topped light in a pointed arch, are from the 14th century. Some of the windows use atypical green glass, and some have frames made out of wood.

Chevron-carved voussoirs (wedges) and three stone human heads, weathered by time and also probably from the 12th century, have been repositioned over the doorway, which is at the west end of the south side of the church. The wedges probably come from a former chancel arch and apse, removed (as in other churches in Anglesey) to make the chancel larger. The doorway has been enlarged at some point, most likely during the early part of the 19th century. On the north side, a doorway was added in the 18th century, but it was subsequently blocked and a window inserted instead. One writer has speculated that this might have been a leper niche and window. There are two other modern windows in the north wall, and all three are at different heights. There is a bellcote at the west end, housing a bell (probably from the 18th century). The roof has been described as being "clearly one of the earliest on the island".

Inside, as well as the Pabo monument on the north wall, there are medieval arched trusses and two 18th-century marble memorials. The font, which is probably 12th-century in date, is a circular bowl about 1 foot (30 cm) in height. There is no division between the nave and chancel, and there is one step from the chancel into the sanctuary, which is marked with a simple rail. The altar is made of wood. The fittings, including plain pews, were added in 1911. There is a carved head above the doorway inside the church, in similar style to those on the outside. "The Llanbabo Devil" (Diafol Llanbabo), a stone previously set in the wall of the churchyard and thought to represent a Celtic deity, is now kept inside the church.

== Assessment ==
The church is a Grade II* listed building – the second-highest (of three) grade of listing, designating "particularly important buildings of more than special interest". It was given this status on 12 May 1970, and has been listed because it is "a good, scarcely altered simple Medieval church which retains a great deal of the Medieval fabric, including decorate fragments of probable 12th century date, and a fine later Medieval roof." According to Cadw (the Welsh Government body responsible for the built heritage of Wales), St Pabo's Church "can be considered an important survivor", as many other old churches on Anglesey were either rebuilt or restored during the 19th century. Some restoration work, including replacement of some of the timbers in the roof, was carried out in 1909 under the architect Harold Hughes, but overall "the church has not suffered from excessive restoration."
