= River Tanat =

River in northern Powys, Wales

Coordinates: 52°47′N 3°07′W

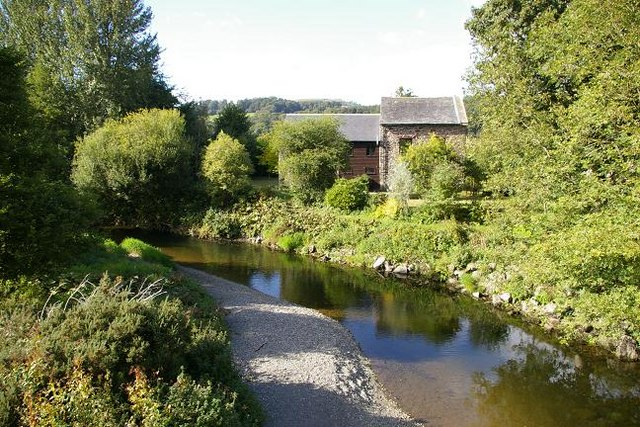
Afon Tanat near Llangedwyn

The River Tanat, also known as Afon Tanat, is a river in northern Powys, Wales. Its source is close to the Cyrniau Nod mountain, to the north of Lake Vyrnwy. The river flows in a generally east-south-east direction until it joins the River Vyrnwy near Llansantffraid-ym-Mechain. For a short distance prior to its confluence it flows within western Shropshire, England.

Its tributaries include the Afon Eirth, Afon Rhaeadr, Afon Iwrch and Afon Goch, and they form part of the Tanat Valley.
