= List of Roman-to-modern scheduled monuments in Powys (Brecknockshire) =

Powys is the largest administrative county in Wales. With over a quarter of Wales's land area, covering much of the eastern half of the country, it is a county of remote uplands, low population and no coastline. It was created in more or less its current form in 1974, and is the only one of the large county units created at that time to have been carried forward intact at the 1996 local government re-organisation. It comprises three historic counties, namely Montgomeryshire, Radnorshire, and most of Brecknockshire. There are 950 scheduled monuments within the county, which is far more than can be sensibly covered in one list. Each of the 3 historic counties is therefore listed separately, and each of these has two lists - one for the prehistoric sites and one for the Roman, medieval and post-medieval sites.

This list shows the sites in Brecknockshire dating to Roman, medieval, post-medieval through to modern times. The area is also historically known as Breconshire, (not including those parts that are no longer in Powys). Brecknockshire is the southern third of Powys, and encompasses parts of the Brecon Beacons National Park, much of the Black Mountains and all of Mynydd Epynt. The River Wye separates it from Radnorshire. There are 135 scheduled monuments on this list. Of these, 10 are Roman, all of which are military in purpose, being either roads or forts and camps. Nine date from the Early Middle Ages, mainly inscribed stones but also including a crannog. There are 78 sites from the post-Norman Medieval period, including castles, mottes and moated sites, churches, town defences and agricultural holdings. The 38 post-medieval sites are even more diverse, covering bridges, tramroads, aqueducts, agricultural sites and lost villages, lead mines, coal mines, industrial sites, and two war-time features from the 1940s.

The 254 scheduled sites dating to prehistoric periods are listed at List of prehistoric scheduled monuments in Powys (Brecknockshire)

Scheduled monuments have statutory protection. It is illegal to disturb the ground surface or any standing remains. The compilation of the list is undertaken by Cadw Welsh Historic Monuments, which is an executive agency of the National Assembly of Wales. The list of scheduled monuments below is supplied by Cadw with additional material from RCAHMW and Clwyd-Powys Archaeological Trust.

== Roman to modern scheduled monuments in Brecknockshire ==
The list is sorted by date, and then by community so that sites of similar age and locality are placed near each other. Clicking on the heading arrows will sort the list by that information.

Image	Name	Site type	Community	Location	Details	Period	SAM No & Refs
	Roman Fort at Pen y Gaer	Roman fort	Llanfihangel Cwmdu with Bwlch and Cathedine	51.8897°N 3.2098°W, SO168219		Roman	BR174
	Abererbwll Roman Fort	Roman fort	Llangamarch, (also Llanfair-ar-y-bryn, see Carmarthenshire)	52.06°N 3.6794°W, SN849415		Roman	CM373
	Y Pigwyn	Marching camp	Llywel, (also Myddfai, see Carmarthenshire)	51.967°N 3.7071°W, SN828312		Roman	BR003
	Roman Road on Mynydd Illtyd, south-western section	Road	Maescar	51.9202°N 3.5123°W, SN960257		Roman	BR224
	Roman Road on Mynydd Illtyd, North-Eastern section	Road	Trallong	51.9277°N 3.5005°W, SN969265		Roman	BR225
	Caerau Roman Site	Roman fort	Treflys	52.1398°N 3.5743°W, SN923502		Roman	BR148
	Tynewydd Roman Road	Road	Treflys	52.1536°N 3.5563°W, SN936517		Roman	BR380
	Brecon Gaer Roman Fort	Roman fort	Yscir	51.9565°N 3.4517°W, SO003296		Roman	BR001
	Roman Marching Camp NE of Maen Madog	Marching camp	Ystradfellte	51.8354°N 3.5637°W, SN923163		Roman	BR162
	Section of Road NE of Coelbren Fort	Road	Ystradfellte	51.7883°N 3.6397°W, SN870112		Roman	BR074
	Crickadarn Camp	Enclosure	Erwood	52.0695°N 3.3323°W, SO087420		Early Medieval	BR033
	Cross-Slab in Churchyard	Cross	Glyn Tarell	51.9433°N 3.439°W, SO011281		Early Medieval	BR121
	Cross-Slab in Church	Cross-marked stone	Honddu Isaf	51.9815°N 3.4079°W, SO034323		Early Medieval	BR120
	Inscribed Stone in Church	Inscribed stone	Llanfihangel Cwmdu with Bwlch and Cathedine	51.907°N 3.1925°W, SO180238		Early Medieval	BR109
	Cross-Slab in Church	Cross	Llanfrynach	51.929°N 3.3257°W, SO089264		Early Medieval	BR122
Llangorse Lake crannog	Crannog in Llangorse Lake	Crannog	Llangors	51.9337°N 3.2685°W, SO128268	A royal hall of the kings of Brycheiniog, now surviving as an artificial island constructed of an oak palisade into which layers of stone, and soil were added. Archaeological digs in the waterlogged conditions have discovered textiles, leather, bronze items, a reliquary and a dugout boat.	Early Medieval (9th century)	BR158
	Early Christian Inscribed Stone in Defynnog Church	Inscribed stone	Maescar	51.9394°N 3.565°W, SN925279		Early Medieval	BR182
	Ponsticill Inscribed Stone	Inscribed stone	Talybont-on-Usk	51.8098°N 3.3457°W, SO073132		Early Medieval	BR141
	Maen Madoc	Inscribed stone	Ystradfellte	51.8302°N 3.5706°W, SN918157		Early Medieval	BR018
	Brecon Castle	Castle	Brecon	51.9494°N 3.3938°W, SO043287		Medieval	BR022
	Castle Mound 800m NNW of Ty'n-y-Caeau	Motte	Brecon	51.9561°N 3.3544°W, SO070295		Medieval	BR046
	St Eluned's Chapel and Well	Chapel	Brecon	51.9478°N 3.3726°W, SO057286		Medieval	BR236
	Town Wall and Gatehouse at Captain's Walk	Town Wall	Brecon	51.9458°N 3.3913°W, SO045284		Medieval	BR177
	Town Wall at Watton Mount	Town defences	Brecon	51.9467°N 3.3882°W, SO046284		Medieval	BR150
	Bronllys Castle	Castle	Bronllys	52.0044°N 3.2407°W, SO149347		Medieval	BR008
	Bronllys moated site	Moated Site	Bronllys	52.0056°N 3.2497°W, SO143348		Medieval	BR058
	Builth Castle	Motte	Builth	52.1492°N 3.3983°W, SO044510		Medieval	BR031
	Caer Beris	Motte	Cilmery	52.1461°N 3.4192°W, SO029507		Medieval	BR093
	Crickhowell Castle	Castle	Crickhowell	51.8572°N 3.1376°W, SO217182		Medieval	BR111
	Maes-Celyn Castle Mound	Motte	Crickhowell	51.8682°N 3.1532°W, SO206194		Medieval	BR055
	Cwmhindda Deserted Rural Settlement	Platform house	Duhonw	52.1162°N 3.4041°W, SO039473		Medieval	BR280
	Castle Earthwork 200m S of Coed Caeau	Ringwork	Erwood	52.0618°N 3.3738°W, SO059412		Medieval	BR179
	Gwenddwr Deserted Village	Deserted Rural Settlement	Erwood	52.0813°N 3.3663°W, SO064434		Medieval	BR168
	Llanfilo Moated Site	Moated Site	Felin-fach	51.9843°N 3.2842°W, SO119325		Medieval	BR152
	Medieval Building in Llanfilo Village	Building (Unclassified)	Felin-fach	51.9907°N 3.2836°W, SO119332		Medieval	BR221
	Moated Site 670m NE of Lower Penwaun	Moated Site	Felin-fach	51.9795°N 3.3352°W, SO083320		Medieval	BR180
	Moated Site 800m NE of Felinfach	Moated Site	Felin-fach	51.993°N 3.3117°W, SO100335		Medieval	BR049
	Moated Site E of Pont-y-Bat Wood	Moated Site	Felin-fach	52.0022°N 3.295°W, SO112345		Medieval	BR050
	Moated Site in Llanfilo Village	Moated Site	Felin-fach	51.9901°N 3.284°W, SO119331		Medieval	BR195
	Oaklands Moated Site	Moated Site	Felin-fach	51.9793°N 3.3473°W, SO075320		Medieval	BR041
	Cilwhybert Castle Mound	Motte	Glyn Tarell	51.9309°N 3.4349°W, SO014267		Medieval	BR127
	Craig Cerrig-Gleisiad Deserted Rural Settlement	Deserted Rural Settlement	Glyn Tarell	51.8919°N 3.5048°W, SN965225		Medieval	BR266
	Earthwork 675m W of Dan-y-Cefn	Ringwork	Glyn Tarell	51.9327°N 3.4431°W, SO008270		Medieval	BR170
	Aberllynfi chapel	Chapel	Gwernyfed	52.0342°N 3.2079°W, SH172379		Medieval	BR351
	Glasbury Old Church	Church	Gwernyfed	52.0425°N 3.2024°W, SO176389		Medieval	BR350
	Great House Mound & Bailey Castle	Motte & Bailey	Gwernyfed	52.0348°N 3.2085°W, SO171380		Medieval	BR080
	Castle Mound near Swan Hotel	Motte	Hay	52.0726°N 3.1299°W, SO226421		Medieval	BR077
	Hay Castle	Castle	Hay	52.0737°N 3.1257°W, SO229423		Medieval	BR076
	Castell Madoc Ringwork	Motte	Honddu Isaf	52.0231°N 3.4219°W, SO025370		Medieval	BR155
	Castell Madoc Mound	Motte	Honddu Isaf	52.0219°N 3.423°W, SO024369		Medieval	BR192
	Llandefaelog Fach Motte	Motte	Honddu Isaf	51.9812°N 3.4093°W, SO033323		Medieval	BR191
	Earthworks SW of Church	Earthwork (unclassified)	Llanafan Fawr	52.1893°N 3.513°W, SN966556		Medieval	BR089
	Hafotau Settlement on Bryn Melys	Rectangular hut settlement	Llanafan Fawr	52.2282°N 3.5659°W, SN931600		Medieval	BR215
	Ringwork near Coed Ty-Mawr	Ringwork	Llanafan Fawr	52.2075°N 3.4851°W, SN986576		Medieval	BR098
	Alexanderstone Mound and Bailey Castle	Motte & Bailey	Llanddew	51.9616°N 3.3506°W, SO073301		Medieval	BR045
	Earthworks South West of Llanddew Church	Earthwork (unclassified)	Llanddew	51.967°N 3.378°W, SO054307		Medieval	BR196
	Llanddew Castle	Castle	Llanddew	51.9676°N 3.376°W, SO055307		Medieval	BR057
	Castell Blaen-Llynfi	Castle	Llanfihangel Cwmdu with Bwlch and Cathedine	51.898°N 3.244°W, SO145228		Medieval	BR009
	Tretower Barn	Barn	Llanfihangel Cwmdu with Bwlch and Cathedine	51.8834°N 3.1837°W, SO186211		Medieval	BR146
Tretower Castle	Tretower Castle	Castle	Llanfihangel Cwmdu with Bwlch and Cathedine	51.8839°N 3.1862°W, SO184212		Medieval	BR014
	Tretower Court	House (domestic)	Llanfihangel Cwmdu with Bwlch and Cathedine	51.8832°N 3.1846°W, SO185211		Medieval	BR117
	Tretower Shrunken Medieval Settlement	Shrunken medieval village	Llanfihangel Cwmdu with Bwlch and Cathedine	51.8848°N 3.1844°W, SO185213		Medieval	BR238
	Hen Castell	Moated Site	Llangattock	51.8422°N 3.144°W, SO212165		Medieval	BR056
	House Platforms and Hollow Ways in the Shrunken Medieval Village of Llanfihangel Tal-y-Llyn	House platform	Llangors	51.9483°N 3.2893°W, SO114285		Medieval	BR220
	Twmpan Castle Mound	Motte	Llangors	51.9228°N 3.2728°W, SO125256		Medieval	BR054
	Llangynidr Deserted Medieval Village (part of)	Deserted Medieval Village	Llangynidr	51.8655°N 3.2293°W, SO154192		Medieval	BR187
	Pen Bwlych Glascwm Pillow Mounds	Pillow mound	Llangynidr	51.8386°N 3.3185°W, SO092163		Medieval	BR252
Llanthomas Castle Mound	Llanthomas Castle Mound	Motte	Llanigon	52.056°N 3.1548°W, SO209403		Medieval	BR078
	The Scottish Pedlar Wayside Cross	Cross	Llanigon	52.0403°N 3.125°W, SO229385		Medieval	BR200
	Corn Drying Kiln 340m S of Cryn-Fryn	Corn-drying kiln	Llanwrthwl	52.2457°N 3.5027°W, SN974619		Medieval	BR183
	Hafotau Settlement on Esgair Gwar-y-Cae	Rectangular hut settlement	Llanwrthwl	52.2407°N 3.5855°W, SN918614		Medieval	BR216
	Allt Fach Deserted Rural Settlement	Deserted Rural Settlement	Llywel	51.8441°N 3.6771°W, SN845175		Medieval	BR263
	Deserted Farmstead South of Ffynnon yr Oerfa	Rectangular hut settlement	Llywel	51.9861°N 3.6548°W, SN864332		Medieval	BR223
	Rectangular Hut, Afon Tawe	Rectangular hut	Llywel	51.8825°N 3.6711°W, SN850217		Medieval	BR260
	Trecastle Mound and Bailey Castle	Motte & Bailey	Llywel	51.9494°N 3.6274°W, SN882291		Medieval	BR026
	Castell-Du, Sennybridge	Castle	Maescar	51.9436°N 3.573°W, SN919284		Medieval	BR126
	Clawdd British	Enclosure	Maescar	52.0186°N 3.6591°W, SN862368		Medieval	BR032
	Hirllwyn Camp	Enclosure	Maescar	52.0308°N 3.6211°W, SN888381		Medieval	BR143
	Cefn Barn Ringwork	Ringwork	Talgarth	51.9745°N 3.2458°W, SO145314		Medieval	BR088
Tower at Great Porthamel	Porthamel Tower	Tower	Talgarth	52.0088°N 3.2259°W, SO159351		Medieval	BR047
	Tredustan Castle Mound	Motte	Talgarth	51.9836°N 3.2536°W, SO140324		Medieval	BR082
	Trefecca Castle Mound	Motte	Talgarth	51.9827°N 3.251°W, SO141323		Medieval	BR083
	Trefecca-Fawr Moated Site	Fishpond	Talgarth	51.9778°N 3.2494°W, SO142317		Medieval	BR087
	Cwm Cwareli Longhouse and Long Hut	Longhouse	Talybont-on-Usk	51.8858°N 3.3707°W, SO058217		Medieval	BR282
	Tor y Foel Deserted Rural Settlement	Platform house	Talybont-on-Usk	51.8643°N 3.2907°W, SO112192		Medieval	BR283
	Churchyard Cross, St Issau's Church	Cross	The Vale of Grwyney	51.8957°N 3.0493°W, SO278224		Medieval	BR172
	Cwm Beusych Deserted Rural Settlement	Platform house	The Vale of Grwyney	51.8876°N 3.0739°W, SO261215		Medieval	BR298
	Llwyn y Brain Deserted Rural Settlement	Platform house	The Vale of Grwyney	51.9014°N 3.0537°W, SO276230		Medieval	BR300
	Two platform buildings on eastern side of Partrishow Hill	Platform House	The Vale of Grwyney	51.8892°N 3.0547°W, SO275217		Medieval	BR416
	Y Cwrt Deserted Rural Settlement	Platform house	The Vale of Grwyney	51.8871°N 3.0673°W, SO266214		Medieval	BR299
	Cwm Camlais Castle	Motte	Trallong	51.9234°N 3.5192°W, SN956260		Medieval	BR037
	Tir-cyd Deserted Rural Settlement	Deserted Rural Settlement	Trallong	52.0274°N 3.5608°W, SN930377		Medieval	BR290
	Caerau Castle Mound	Motte	Treflys	52.139°N 3.575°W, SN923501		Medieval	BR130
	Fforest Castle Mound	Motte	Treflys	52.1559°N 3.5809°W, SN919520		Medieval	BR131
	Aberyscir Castle Mound	Motte	Yscir	51.9555°N 3.4561°W, SO000295		Medieval	BR021
	Castell Coch	Motte & Bailey	Ystradfellte	51.8189°N 3.5453°W, SN935144		Medieval	BR081
	Enclosures East of Afon Llia	Enclosure - Agricultural	Ystradfellte	51.8541°N 3.5586°W, SN927184		Medieval	BR258
	Brecon Bridge	Bridge	Brecon	51.9476°N 3.3937°W, SO043285		Post-Medieval/Modern	BR004
	Pont Gihirych	Bridge	Cray	51.8781°N 3.6201°W, SN885211		Post-Medieval/Modern	BR199
	Porth Mawr	Gatehouse	Crickhowell	51.8604°N 3.1376°W, SO217185		Post-Medieval/Modern	BR114
	Cefn Corast Deserted Rural Settlement	Rectangular hut	Duhonw	52.1036°N 3.4619°W, SN999460		Post-Medieval/Modern	BR289
	Hendy Long Hut	Rectangular hut	Erwood	52.1114°N 3.378°W, SO057467		Post-Medieval/Modern	BR281
	Y Gyrn Hut Platform (N)	House platform	Glyn Tarell	51.8945°N 3.4786°W, SN983228		Post-Medieval/Modern	BR390
	Y Gyrn Hut Platform (S)	House platform	Glyn Tarell	51.8923°N 3.4798°W, SN982225		Post-Medieval/Modern	BR393
	Y Gyrn Hut Platforms	House platform	Glyn Tarell	51.8931°N 3.4788°W, SN983226		Post-Medieval/Modern	BR392
	Y Gyrn Longhuts	Deserted Rural Settlement	Glyn Tarell	51.8935°N 3.4788°W, SN983228	Blaenglyn longhouse	Post-Medieval/Modern	BR391
	Garden Earthworks at Old Gwernyfed	Garden	Gwernyfed	52.0212°N 3.194°W, SO181365		Post-Medieval/Modern	BR193
	Brynich Aqueduct (Brecknock & Abergavenny Canal)	Aqueduct	Llanfrynach	51.9365°N 3.3409°W, SO079273		Post-Medieval/Modern	BR185
	Llwyn-on Farmstead	Farmstead	Llanfrynach	51.8451°N 3.4087°W, SO030172		Post-Medieval/Modern	BR240
	Crickhowell Bridge	Bridge	Llangattock	51.8564°N 3.1421°W, SO214181		Post-Medieval/Modern	BR005
	Disgwylfa Tramroads	Tramroad	Llangattock, (also Llanelly), (see also Monmouthshire)	51.8189°N 3.1371°W, SO217139		Post Medieval/Modern	MM340
	Llangattock Tramroad Inclines	Tramroad	Llangattock	51.8385°N 3.1641°W, SO198161		Post-Medieval/Modern	BR234
	Nant Morlais Hafod	Enclosure	Llangynidr	51.7974°N 3.3498°W, SO070118		Post-Medieval/Modern	BR279
	Cerrig Llwydion Deserted Rural Settlement	Deserted Rural Settlement	Llanwrthwl	52.2474°N 3.6402°W, SN881622		Post-Medieval/Modern	BR287
	Dalrhiw Lead Mine	Lead mine	Llanwrthwl	52.2338°N 3.6341°W, SN885607		Post-Medieval/Modern	BR231
	Hafod Rhiwnant Deserted Rural Settlement	Longhouse	Llanwrthwl	52.2271°N 3.6466°W, SN876600		Post-Medieval/Modern	RD199
	Nant-y-Car South Lead Mine	Lead mine	Llanwrthwl	52.2348°N 3.6328°W, SN885608		Post-Medieval/Modern	BR232
	Nant-y-Garw Lead Mine	Lead mine	Llanwrthwl	52.2323°N 3.6482°W, SN875606		Post-Medieval/Modern	BR233
	Nant-y-Gro Dam	Dam	Llanwrthwl	52.2589°N 3.5809°W, SN921634		Post-Medieval/Modern	BR387
	Nant y Gaseg long hut	Rectangular hut	Maescar	51.8694°N 3.5254°W, SN950200		Post-Medieval/Modern	BR284
	Pant-y-Blodau Deserted Rural Settlement	Rectangular hut	Maescar	52.0237°N 3.6161°W, SN892373		Post-Medieval/Modern	BR288
	Pillow Mounds at Pant Mawr	Pillow mound	Tawe-Uchaf	51.8074°N 3.6183°W, SN885133		Post-Medieval/Modern	BR173
	Afon Hepste Settlement Enclosure	Enclosure - Domestic	Ystradfellte	51.8164°N 3.4867°W, SN976141		Post-Medieval/Modern	BR412
	Glynneath Gunpowder Works	Industrial monument	Ystradfellte, (also Hirwaun), (see also Rhondda, Cynon, Taff)	51.7658°N 3.5654°W, SN920086		Post-Medieval/Modern	BR230
	Mynydd y Garn Enclosure	Enclosure	Ystradfellte	51.8096°N 3.5059°W, SN962134		Post-Medieval/Modern	BR410
	Mynydd y Garn Lluest East	Enclosure	Ystradfellte	51.8118°N 3.508°W, SN961136		Post-Medieval/Modern	BR409
	Mynydd y Garn Lluest West	Enclosure	Ystradfellte	51.8083°N 3.51°W, SN959132		Post-Medieval/Modern	BR408
	Abercrave Ironworks	Industrial monument	Ystradgynlais	51.7994°N 3.7272°W, SN809126		Post-Medieval/Modern	BR222
Swansea Canal Aqueduct at Ystalyfera	Canal Aqueduct over the River Twrch, Ystalyfera	Aqueduct	Ystradgynlais, (also Ystalyfera, see Neath Port Talbot)	51.7684°N 3.7799°W, SN772092	Stone aqueduct built over a weir, carrying the Swansea Canal over the River Twrch. Its three massive arches make it the largest of the five aqueducts on the canal. Built in 1798 by Thomas Sheasby, it was innovative in using Hydraulic cement to line the trough instead of puddled clay. Its proximity to the Capitol Cinema gave it the local name of 'Capitol Bridge'. It was restored in 1995 but is not currently water-filled, the canal route on either side being dry.	Post-Medieval/Modern (1798)	GM396
	Claypon's Tramroad at Ystradgynlais	Tramroad	Ystradgynlais, (also Seven Sisters), (also Tawe-Uchaf), (see also Neath Port Talbot)	51.7734°N 3.7218°W, SN812097	Early tramroad, bringing coal from Drim Colliery and limestone (needed as a flux) from the quarries of Mynydd y Drum to the Ynyscedwyn Ironworks in the Swansea Valley. Built by Joseph Claypon in 1832 and in use until 1867, the tramroad linked with the Brecon Forest Tramroad, and parts were later incorporated into the Swansea Vale Railway.	Post-Medieval/Modern (1832)	GM399
	Cribarth Limestone Quarries and Tramroads	Quarry	Ystradgynlais	51.8136°N 3.7013°W, SN828141		Post-Medieval/Modern	BR237
	Lefel Fawr Coal Adit	Coal Adit	Ystradgynlais	51.798°N 3.7193°W, SN815124		Post-Medieval/Modern	BR201
	Ynysgedwyn Colliery, Fan House	Fan House	Ystradgynlais	51.786°N 3.7388°W, SN801111	Colliery ventilation shaft Guibal fan house, built around 1880, for Hendre-ladis Colliery, later Ynysgedwyn colliery, which closed in 1967.	Post-Medieval/Modern	BR198
	Coed Chwefri Vickers Machine Gun Emplacement	Pillbox	Cilmery	52.1503°N 3.4182°W, SO030511	Polygonal concrete pillbox with three Embrasures and gun platforms, with views across the Chwefri valley, close to Builth Wells.	Post-Medieval/Modern	BR399
Storey Arms tank traps	Storey Arms Anti-invasion Defences	Infantry support trench	Glyn Tarell	51.8676°N 3.4712°W, SN988198	Dating to the early part of World War II, two pillboxes, trenches, and two lines of anti-tank blocks formed part of the Western Command Stop Line, in case of an invasion via Ireland.	Post-Medieval/Modern	BR337

Scheduled Monuments in Brecknockshire, Powys, Wales.
=Roman =Early Medieval =Medieval
=Post-Medieval/Modern

== See also ==
- List of Cadw properties
- List of castles in Wales
- List of hill forts in Wales
- Historic houses in Wales
- List of monastic houses in Wales
- List of museums in Wales
- List of Roman villas in Wales
