= List of prehistoric scheduled monuments in Powys (Brecknockshire) =

Powys is the largest administrative county in Wales. With over a quarter of Wales's land area, and covering much of the eastern half of the country, it is a county of remote uplands, low population and no coastline. It was created in more or less its current form in 1974, and is the only one of the large county units created at that time to have been carried forward intact at the 1996 local government re-organisation. It comprises three historic counties, namely Montgomeryshire, Radnorshire, and most of Brecknockshire. There are 950 Scheduled monuments within the county, which is far more than can be sensibly covered in one list. Each of the 3 historic counties is therefore listed separately, and each of these has two lists - one for the prehistoric sites and one for the Roman, medieval and post-medieval sites.

This list shows the many prehistoric sites in Brecknockshire (also historically known as Breconshire, and not including those parts that are no longer in Powys). Brecknockshire is the southern third of Powys, and encompasses parts of the Brecon Beacons National Park, including the larger part of the Black Mountains and all of Mynydd Epynt. The River Wye separates it from Radnorshire, and Montgomeryshire forms the northern third of Powys. There are 254 prehistoric scheduled monuments in the Brecknockshire area. Of these, 12 are Neolithic burial sites whilst 190 are likely to date from the Bronze Age, mainly burial sites of various sorts but also including 44 standing stones, stones circles and stone alignments. There are 52 Iron Age hillforts, defensive and other enclosures including settlements and hut sites.

The lists of Scheduled Monuments in Powys are as follows:-

- List of Scheduled prehistoric Monuments in Powys (Brecknockshire) (254 sites - shown below)
- List of Scheduled Roman to modern Monuments in Powys (Brecknockshire) (135 sites)
- List of Scheduled prehistoric Monuments in Powys (Radnorshire) (139 sites)
- List of Scheduled Roman to modern Monuments in Powys (Radnorshire) (119 sites)
- List of Scheduled prehistoric Monuments in Powys (Montgomeryshire) (190 sites)
- List of Scheduled Roman to modern Monuments in Powys (Montgomeryshire) (113 sites)

Scheduled Ancient Monuments (SAMs) have statutory protection. It is illegal to disturb the ground surface or any standing remains. The compilation of the list is undertaken by Cadw Welsh Historic Monuments, which is an executive agency of the National Assembly of Wales. The list of scheduled monuments below is supplied by Cadw with additional material from RCAHMW and Clwyd-Powys Archaeological Trust.

== Scheduled prehistoric Monuments in Brecknockshire ==
The list is sorted by date, and then by Community so that sites of similar age and locality are placed near each other. Clicking on the heading arrows will sort the list by that information.

Image	Name	Site type	Community	Location	Details	Period	SAM No & Refs
	Pipton Long Barrow	Long barrow	Bronllys	52.0275°N 3.2252°W, SO160372	A wedge-shaped mound with two portal stones. It was excavated in 1949, when the burials of 5 individuals were found, along with Neolithic pottery and a flint flake.	Prehistoric (Neolithic)	BR029
Gwernvale Neolithic burial chamber	Gwernvale chambered cairn	Chambered long barrow	Crickhowell	51.866°N 3.1471°W, SO211192		Prehistoric	BR016
	Little Lodge Long Barrow	Chambered long barrow	Gwernyfed	52.0349°N 3.1934°W, SO182380		Prehistoric	BR067
	Ty Illtyd Long Barrow	Chambered long barrow	Llanfrynach	51.9286°N 3.3126°W, SO098263		Prehistoric	BR011
	Garn Coch	Chambered long barrow	Llangattock	51.8524°N 3.145°W, SO212177		Prehistoric	BR028
	Pen-y-Wyrlod Long Barrow	Chambered long barrow	Llanigon	52.0517°N 3.132°W, SO224398		Prehistoric	BR012
	Cwm Fforest Long Barrow	Chambered long barrow	Talgarth	51.9575°N 3.19°W, SO183294		Prehistoric	BR007
	Ffostyll Long Barrows	Chambered long barrow	Talgarth	52.0063°N 3.1977°W, SO178349		Prehistoric	BR002
	Mynydd Troed Long Barrow	Long barrow	Talgarth	51.9478°N 3.2217°W, SO161284		Prehistoric	BR013
	Pen y Wyrlod Long Cairn	Chambered long cairn	Talgarth	51.976°N 3.2381°W, SO150315		Prehistoric	BR175
	Ty-Isaf Long Barrow	Chambered long barrow	Talgarth	51.954°N 3.1918°W, SO181290		Prehistoric	BR006
	Abercynafon Neolithic Site	Waterlogged deposit	Talybont-on-Usk	51.8479°N 3.3434°W, SO075174		Prehistoric	BR249
	Round Barrow 400m S of Church	Round barrow	Bronllys	52.0309°N 3.2683°W, SO130376		Prehistoric	BR048
	Round Barrow 90m NE of Pipton Farm	Mound	Bronllys	52.0352°N 3.2144°W, SO167381		Prehistoric	BR079
	Standing Stone E of Llangoed Wood	Standing stone	Bronllys	52.0477°N 3.2804°W, SO122395		Prehistoric	BR086
	Tower Hill Round Barrow	Round barrow	Cilmery	52.155°N 3.4663°W, SN997517		Prehistoric	BR147
	Fan Gyhirych round cairn	Round cairn	Cray	51.8597°N 3.6269°W, SN880191		Prehistoric	BR330
	Waunewydd standing stone	Standing stone	Cray	51.8975°N 3.6372°W, SN874233		Prehistoric	BR336
	Darren ring cairn	Ring cairn	Crickhowell	51.8852°N 3.1454°W, SO212213		Prehistoric	BR302
	Great Oak Road standing stone	Standing stone	Crickhowell	51.8593°N 3.1315°W, SO221184		Prehistoric	BR301
	Pen Cerrig-calch, cairn on NW side of	Round cairn	Crickhowell	51.8948°N 3.14°W, SO216224		Prehistoric	BR304
	Pen Cerrig-calch, cairn on S side of	Round cairn	Crickhowell	51.8931°N 3.1385°W, SO217222		Prehistoric	BR303
	Banc y Celyn Stone Circle	Stone circle	Erwood	52.1072°N 3.3861°W, SO051463		Prehistoric	BR206
	Cefn Clawdd Cairn	Cairn	Erwood	52.0548°N 3.413°W, SO032405		Prehistoric	BR204
	Cefn Clawdd Cairn (East)	Round cairn	Erwood	52.053°N 3.3969°W, SO043403		Prehistoric	BR402
	Gwaun Ymryson Round Cairn	Cairn	Erwood	52.0598°N 3.4131°W, SO032411		Prehistoric	BR205
	Ring Cairn on Waun Gunllwch	Ring cairn	Erwood	52.0607°N 3.3703°W, SO061411		Prehistoric	BR181
	Bedd Gwyl Illtyd round cairn	Round cairn	Glyn Tarell	51.9265°N 3.4935°W, SN973263		Prehistoric	BR326
	Blaen Glyn Round Cairn	Round cairn	Glyn Tarell	51.8883°N 3.4911°W, SN974221		Prehistoric	BR235
	Fan Frynych kerb cairn	Kerb cairn	Glyn Tarell	51.8976°N 3.5087°W, SN962231		Prehistoric	BR329
	Standing Stone on Mynydd Illtyd	Standing stone	Glyn Tarell	51.9278°N 3.4908°W, SN975265		Prehistoric	BR228
	Two Cairns on Traeth Mawr	Cairn	Glyn Tarell	51.9204°N 3.5053°W, SN965257		Prehistoric	BR227
	Coed y Polyn round barrow	Round barrow	Gwernyfed	52.0373°N 3.1957°W, SO180383		Prehistoric	BR321
	Bryn Ring Cairn	Ring cairn	Llanafan Fawr	52.1823°N 3.5954°W, SN910549		Prehistoric	BR381
	Bryn Round Cairn	Round cairn	Llanafan Fawr	52.1828°N 3.5963°W, SN909550		Prehistoric	BR382
	Carn Pantmaenllwyd Cairn	Ring cairn	Llanafan Fawr	52.2188°N 3.5284°W, SH956589		Prehistoric	BR379
	Carn-y-Geifr	Round cairn	Llanafan Fawr	52.2325°N 3.5078°W, SN971604		Prehistoric	BR095
	Cefn Ty-Mawr	Round cairn	Llanafan Fawr	52.2085°N 3.4864°W, SN985577		Prehistoric	BR097
	Darren Round Cairn	Round cairn	Llanafan Fawr	52.1966°N 3.5944°W, SN911565		Prehistoric	BR383
	Gorllwyn Round Cairns	Round cairn	Llanafan Fawr	52.217°N 3.5881°W, SN915588		Prehistoric	BR384
	Gurnos Ring Cairn	Ring cairn	Llanafan Fawr	52.2085°N 3.5777°W, SN922578		Prehistoric	BR385
	Hafen Standing Stone Pair	Standing stone	Llanafan Fawr	52.2247°N 3.5211°W, SN961595		Prehistoric	BR378
	Llethyr Waun Llwyd Ring Cairn	Ring cairn	Llanafan Fawr	52.2294°N 3.4972°W, SN978600		Prehistoric	BR367
	Pen-y-bont Standing Stone	Standing stone	Llanafan Fawr	52.2117°N 3.4458°W, SO013580		Prehistoric	BR265
	Saith-Maen Standing Stones	Stone alignment	Llanafan Fawr	52.231°N 3.5398°W, SN949603		Prehistoric	BR065
	Standing Stone NE of Capel Rhos	Standing stone	Llanafan Fawr	52.1909°N 3.5394°W, SN948558		Prehistoric	BR090
	Standing Stone SSE of Dol-y-Felin	Standing stone	Llanafan Fawr	52.1841°N 3.4983°W, SN976550		Prehistoric	BR091
	Blaen y Cwm Uchaf Cairn Cemetery	Round cairn	Llanfihangel Cwmdu with Bwlch and Cathedine	51.9174°N 3.2234°W, SO159250		Prehistoric	BR295
	Bwlch Round Cairn	Round cairn	Llanfihangel Cwmdu with Bwlch and Cathedine	51.8983°N 3.2301°W, SO154229		Prehistoric	BR124
	Cefn Moel Round Barrows	Round cairn	Llanfihangel Cwmdu with Bwlch and Cathedine	51.9055°N 3.228°W, SO156237		Prehistoric	BR125
	Cefn Moel Round Cairn and Ritual Platform	Round cairn	Llanfihangel Cwmdu with Bwlch and Cathedine	51.9102°N 3.2234°W, SH159242		Prehistoric	BR293
	Cefn Moel Round Cairn III	Round cairn	Llanfihangel Cwmdu with Bwlch and Cathedine	51.9157°N 3.2214°W, SO160248		Prehistoric	BR292
	Ffynnon Las Bronze Age Ritual Complex	Round cairn	Llanfihangel Cwmdu with Bwlch and Cathedine	51.9016°N 3.2254°W, SO157232		Prehistoric	BR296
	Ffynnon Las Round Cairn I	Round cairn	Llanfihangel Cwmdu with Bwlch and Cathedine	51.9037°N 3.228°W, SO156235		Prehistoric	BR294
	Llwyn-y-Fedwen Standing Stone	Standing stone	Llanfihangel Cwmdu with Bwlch and Cathedine	51.8757°N 3.2271°W, SO156203		Prehistoric	BR112
	Maes Clythan Wood cairn	Round cairn	Llanfihangel Cwmdu with Bwlch and Cathedine	51.912°N 3.2206°W, SO161244		Prehistoric	BR310
	Mynydd Llangorse Cairn	Round cairn	Llanfihangel Cwmdu with Bwlch and Cathedine	51.9274°N 3.2147°W, SO165261		Prehistoric	BR059
	Pen Allt-mawr platform cairn	Platform Cairn	Llanfihangel Cwmdu with Bwlch and Cathedine	51.9119°N 3.1543°W, SO206243		Prehistoric	BR305
	Pen Gloch-y-pibwr, cairn on W side of	Round cairn	Llanfihangel Cwmdu with Bwlch and Cathedine	51.9077°N 3.155°W, SO206238		Prehistoric	BR306
	Pen Gloch-y-pibwr, platform cairn on S end of	Platform Cairn	Llanfihangel Cwmdu with Bwlch and Cathedine	51.9017°N 3.1612°W, SO202232		Prehistoric	BR307
	Pen Tir Ring Cairn and Ritual Platform	Ring cairn	Llanfihangel Cwmdu with Bwlch and Cathedine	51.9242°N 3.2072°W, SO170257		Prehistoric	BR291
	Pen Tir, cairn on S end of	Round cairn	Llanfihangel Cwmdu with Bwlch and Cathedine	51.9119°N 3.1993°W, SO176243		Prehistoric	BR308
	Penmyarth Standing Stone	Standing stone	Llanfihangel Cwmdu with Bwlch and Cathedine	51.8713°N 3.1882°W, SO182198		Prehistoric	BR133
	Standing Stone North of Tretower	Standing stone	Llanfihangel Cwmdu with Bwlch and Cathedine	51.8898°N 3.1923°W, SO180219		Prehistoric	BR273
	Lower Neuadd Standing Stone	Standing stone	Llanfrynach	51.8511°N 3.4078°W, SO031178		Prehistoric	BR239
	The Peterstone	Standing stone	Llanfrynach	51.9317°N 3.326°W, SO089267		Prehistoric	BR268
	Twyn Garreg Wen Cairn	Round cairn	Llanfrynach	51.8405°N 3.4755°W, SN984167		Prehistoric	BR276
	Round Barrows 2400m WNW of Drover's Arms	Round barrow	Llangamarch	52.1058°N 3.5194°W, SN960463		Prehistoric	BR102
	Round Barrows N & NE of Ffynnon Dafydd-Bevan	Round barrow	Llangamarch	52.0782°N 3.5664°W, SN927433		Prehistoric	BR100
	Tri Chrugiau Round Barrows	Round barrow	Llangamarch	52.0817°N 3.5597°W, SN932437		Prehistoric	BR101
	Mynydd Llangattock Round Cairn	Round cairn	Llangattock	51.8317°N 3.17°W, SO194154		Prehistoric	BR361
	Mynydd Pen-cyrn Round Cairn	Round cairn	Llangattock	51.8236°N 3.1667°W, SO196145		Prehistoric	BR360
	Twr Pen-cyrn Round Cairns	Round cairn	Llangattock	51.8234°N 3.158°W, SO202145		Prehistoric	BR359
	Waun Cyrn Round Cairn	Round cairn	Llangattock	51.8238°N 3.1474°W, SO210145		Prehistoric	BR358
	Mynydd Llangorse, cairn on S end of	Round cairn	Llangors	51.9221°N 3.228°W, SO156255		Prehistoric	BR309
	Carn Caws Round Cairn	Round cairn	Llangynidr	51.8428°N 3.2647°W, SO129167		Prehistoric	BR355
	Carn Caws, Round Cairn to N of	Round cairn	Llangynidr	51.8449°N 3.2649°W, SO129170		Prehistoric	BR356
	Carn y Bugail and Carn Felen	Round cairn	Llangynidr	51.8138°N 3.3243°W, SO088136		Prehistoric	BR277
	Carreg Waun Llech Prehistoric Standing Stone	Standing stone	Llangynidr	51.8487°N 3.2153°W, SO163173		Prehistoric	BR272
	Carreg Wen Fawr y Rugos Cairn Cemetery	Cairn cemetery	Llangynidr	51.8492°N 3.2613°W, SO131174		Prehistoric	BR354
	Clo Cadno Platform Cairn	Platform Cairn	Llangynidr	51.8386°N 3.2892°W, SO112163		Prehistoric	BR372
	Garn Fawr round cairn	Round cairn	Llangynidr	51.828°N 3.2733°W, SO123151		Prehistoric	BR322
	Pant Serthfa Round Cairn	Round cairn	Llangynidr	51.8421°N 3.2752°W, SO122167		Prehistoric	BR373
	Pant Serthfa Stone Row	Stone Row	Llangynidr	51.8423°N 3.281°W, SO118167		Prehistoric	BR374
	Twyn Ceilog Round Cairn	Round cairn	Llangynidr	51.8093°N 3.3081°W, SO099131		Prehistoric	BR389
	Twyn Disgwylfa Platform Cairn	Platform Cairn	Llangynidr	51.8518°N 3.2174°W, SO162177		Prehistoric	BR357
	Waun y Gwair Cairn	Round cairn	Llangynidr	51.8015°N 3.3401°W, SO076122		Prehistoric	BR278
	Remains of Blaenau Stone Circle	Stone circle	Llanigon	52.0294°N 3.1102°W, SO239373		Prehistoric	BR167
	Twyn-y-Beddau Round Barrow	Round cairn	Llanigon	52.0407°N 3.1073°W, SO241386		Prehistoric	BR119
	Banc Ystrad-Wen Cairn Cemetery	Round cairn	Llanwrthwl	52.2425°N 3.4917°W, SN982615		Prehistoric	BR094
	Cairns and Standing Stones on Carnau Cefn-y-Ffordd	Ring cairn	Llanwrthwl	52.2332°N 3.5296°W, SN956605		Prehistoric	BR217
	Corn Gafallt Cairn Cemetery	Round cairn	Llanwrthwl	52.2676°N 3.5502°W, SN943644		Prehistoric	BR297
	Crugian Bach Stone Circle	Stone circle	Llanwrthwl	52.2495°N 3.5665°W, SN931624		Prehistoric	BR274
	Ffynnon Mary Burnt Mound 300m SE of Carn Wen	Burnt mound	Llanwrthwl	52.2304°N 3.4916°W, SN982601		Prehistoric	BR420
	Gro Hill Cairn Cemetery	Cairn cemetery	Llanwrthwl	52.2483°N 3.5737°W, SN926622		Prehistoric	BR397
	Gro Hill Round Cairn	Round cairn	Llanwrthwl	52.246°N 3.5761°W, SN924620		Prehistoric	BR396
	Nant y Gro Round Cairn	Round cairn	Llanwrthwl	52.2491°N 3.5746°W, SN926623		Prehistoric	BR398
	Nant y Gro Round Cairns	Round cairn	Llanwrthwl	52.2498°N 3.5681°W, SN930624		Prehistoric	BR375
	Nant y Postau Round Cairn	Round cairn	Llanwrthwl	52.2469°N 3.5799°W, SN922621		Prehistoric	BR395
	Recumbent Standing Stone 100m E of Crugian Stone Circle	Standing stone	Llanwrthwl	52.2497°N 3.5651°W, SN932624		Prehistoric	BR421
	Ring Cairn on Esgair Ceiliog	Ring cairn	Llanwrthwl	52.2329°N 3.6154°W, SN897606		Prehistoric	BR208
	Ring Cairn on Garn Lwyd	Ring cairn	Llanwrthwl	52.244°N 3.584°W, SN919618		Prehistoric	BR214
	Round Cairn 130m E of Cryn-Fryn	Round cairn	Llanwrthwl	52.2491°N 3.5002°W, SN976622		Prehistoric	BR184
	Round Cairn to NW of Gro Hill	Round cairn	Llanwrthwl	52.2501°N 3.5803°W, SN922625		Prehistoric	BR394
	Standing Stone above Craig Rhiwnant	Standing stone	Llanwrthwl	52.2386°N 3.6392°W, SN881613		Prehistoric	BR210
	Standing Stone, Llanwrthwl Churchyard	Standing stone	Llanwrthwl	52.2621°N 3.5022°W, SN975637		Prehistoric	BR419
	Three Round Cairns on y Gamriw	Round cairn	Llanwrthwl	52.2408°N 3.5485°W, SN943614		Prehistoric	BR212
	Two Ring Cairns near Esgair Hafod	Ring cairn	Llanwrthwl	52.2332°N 3.6249°W, SN891606		Prehistoric	BR211
	Two Round Cairns on y Gamriw	Cairn	Llanwrthwl	52.2436°N 3.5344°W, SN953617		Prehistoric	BR213
	Ty'n y Graig Round Cairn	Round cairn	Llanwrthwl	52.2579°N 3.5711°W, SN928633		Prehistoric	BR376
	Ty'n y Pant Round Cairns	Round cairn	Llanwrthwl	52.2576°N 3.5686°W, SN930633		Prehistoric	BR377
	Cambrian Factory Standing Stone	Standing stone	Llanwrtyd Wells	52.0961°N 3.6291°W, SN884474		Prehistoric	BR132
	Castell Llygoden Platform Cairn	Platform Cairn	Llanwrtyd Wells	52.1974°N 3.7397°W, SN811568		Prehistoric	BR370
	Cwm Irfon Standing Stone	Standing stone	Llanwrtyd Wells	52.1351°N 3.6693°W, SN858498		Prehistoric	BR264
	Drygarn Fach Round Cairn	Round cairn	Llanwrtyd Wells	52.1965°N 3.6745°W, SN856566		Prehistoric	BR369
	Esgair Garn Ring Cairn	Ring cairn	Llanwrtyd Wells	52.1344°N 3.7097°W, SN830498		Prehistoric	BR363
	Esgair Irfon Round Cairn	Round cairn	Llanwrtyd Wells	52.1779°N 3.6885°W, SN846546		Prehistoric	BR368
	Garn Wen Round Cairn	Round cairn	Llanwrtyd Wells	52.1°N 3.6874°W, SN845459		Prehistoric	BR364
	Garth Cairn Cemetery	Round cairn	Llanwrtyd Wells	52.2318°N 3.487°W, SN984604		Prehistoric	BR366
	Pen Twr Ring Cairn	Ring cairn	Llanwrtyd Wells	52.1564°N 3.6151°W, SN896521		Prehistoric	BR371
	Waun Coli Round Cairn	Round cairn	Llanwrtyd Wells	52.1057°N 3.6843°W, SN847465		Prehistoric	BR365
	Blaen Clydach Fach Platform Cairn	Platform Cairn	Llywel	51.9735°N 3.6609°W, SN860318		Prehistoric	BR349
	Blaen Clydach Fach Round Cairn	Round cairn	Llywel	51.9721°N 3.6603°W, SN680317		Prehistoric	BR348
	Burnt Mound South of Fan Hir	Burnt mound	Llywel	51.8486°N 3.6853°W, SN840180		Prehistoric	BR257
	Cefn Cul ring cairn	Ring cairn	Llywel	51.8552°N 3.6628°W, SN855187		Prehistoric	BR335
	Cerrig Duon Stone Circle	Stone circle	Llywel	51.8723°N 3.6698°W, SN851206		Prehistoric	BR071
	Cwm Henwen round barrow	Round cairn	Llywel	51.9508°N 3.7026°W, SN830294		Prehistoric	BR347
	Cwm Henwen standing stone	Standing stone	Llywel	51.9498°N 3.7043°W, SN829292		Prehistoric	BR346
	Garn Las platform cairn	Platform Cairn	Llywel	51.9093°N 3.7055°W, SN827247		Prehistoric	BR339
	Garn Las ring cairn	Ring cairn	Llywel	51.9112°N 3.7043°W, SN828250		Prehistoric	BR338
	Gilfach, Round Cairn 500m WSW of	Round cairn	Llywel	51.9579°N 3.6107°W, SN894300		Prehistoric	BR403
	Gwern-Wyddog Standing Stone	Standing stone	Llywel	51.9413°N 3.6988°W, SN833283		Prehistoric	BR144
	Mynydd Bach-Trecastell Round Cairn	Round cairn	Llywel	51.965°N 3.7022°W, SN831309		Prehistoric	BR142
	Mynydd Bach-Trecastell Stone Circles	Stone circle	Llywel	51.9659°N 3.6997°W, SN833310		Prehistoric	BR069
	Nant Tarw Stone Circles	Stone circle	Llywel	51.9185°N 3.7186°W, SN818258		Prehistoric	BR070
	Nant Tawe Fechan Burnt Mound	Burnt mound	Llywel	51.8583°N 3.6863°W, SN839190		Prehistoric	BR406
	Pant Madog round cairn	Round cairn	Llywel	51.9567°N 3.6805°W, SN846300		Prehistoric	BR341
	Troed Rhiw Wen Prehistoric Standing Stone	Standing stone	Llywel	51.9174°N 3.6938°W, SN836256		Prehistoric	BR269
	Two Cairns on Fan Foel	Round cairn	Llywel, (also Llanddeusant, see Carmarthenshire)	51.8871°N 3.7138°W, SN821223		Prehistoric	BR275
	Tyle-mawr round cairn	Round cairn	Llywel	51.9497°N 3.6522°W, SN865292		Prehistoric	BR340
	Waun Leuci Standing Stone	Standing stone	Llywel	51.8803°N 3.6654°W, SN854215		Prehistoric	BR255
	Garn Wen Round Cairn	Round barrow	Maescar	52.018°N 3.6375°W, SN877367		Prehistoric	BR107
	Maen Llia Stone	Standing stone	Maescar	51.8608°N 3.5636°W, SN924191		Prehistoric	BR017
	Nant Mawr Round Cairn	Round cairn	Maescar	51.866°N 3.5216°W, SN953196		Prehistoric	BR285
	Rectangular Platform	Ritual platform	Maescar	51.8597°N 3.5633°W, SN924190		Prehistoric	BR262
	Round Barrow SE of Llyn Nant-Llys	Round barrow	Maescar	51.9901°N 3.62°W, SN888336		Prehistoric	BR219
	Round Barrow SW of Maen Llia	Ring cairn	Maescar	51.8589°N 3.5649°W, SN923189		Prehistoric	BR163
	Round Cairn 800m SW of Gwar-y-Felin	Round cairn	Maescar	52.0024°N 3.567°W, SN925349		Prehistoric	BR104
	Round Cairn S of Bryn Melin	Round barrow	Maescar	52.0191°N 3.6211°W, SN888369		Prehistoric	BR108
	Round Cairn SE of Maen Llia	Round cairn	Maescar	51.8589°N 3.5603°W, SN926189		Prehistoric	BR261
	Standing Stone near Traeth Bach	Standing stone	Maescar	51.9173°N 3.5079°W, SN963253		Prehistoric	BR226
	Bailey Bach Round Cairn and Cist	Cairn	Merthyr Cynog	52.0433°N 3.4151°W, SO030392		Prehistoric	BR207
	Cefn Merthyr Cynog Cairn	Round cairn	Merthyr Cynog	52.0392°N 3.4998°W, SN972389		Prehistoric	BR401
	Twyn y Post Cairns	Platform Cairn	Merthyr Cynog	52.0578°N 3.4188°W, SO028408		Prehistoric	BR203
	Bwlch Bach a'r Grib round cairn	Round cairn	Talgarth	51.9697°N 3.185°W, SO186307		Prehistoric	BR316
	Bwlch Bach a'r Grib, round cairn to SW of	Round cairn	Talgarth	51.9691°N 3.1878°W, SO184307		Prehistoric	BR317
	Mynydd Bychan platform cairn	Platform Cairn	Talgarth	51.9809°N 3.171°W, SO196320		Prehistoric	BR320
	Pen Trumau Round Cairns	Round cairn	Talgarth	51.9548°N 3.1678°W, SO198291		Prehistoric	BR129
	Wern Frank Wood round cairn	Round cairn	Talgarth	51.9909°N 3.1744°W, SO194331		Prehistoric	BR319
	Buarth y Caerau Cairn	Round cairn	Talybont-on-Usk	51.8109°N 3.3456°W, SO073133		Prehistoric	BR286
	Gileston Standing Stone	Standing stone	Talybont-on-Usk	51.9052°N 3.2853°W, SO116237		Prehistoric	BR140
	Pontsticill Platform Cairn	Platform Cairn	Talybont-on-Usk	51.8°N 3.3551°W, SO066121		Prehistoric	BR362
	Saith Maen	Stone alignment	Tawe-Uchaf	51.8249°N 3.6948°W, SN832153		Prehistoric	BR072
	Cwrt-y-Gollen Standing Stone	Standing stone	The Vale of Grwyney	51.8451°N 3.1155°W, SO232168		Prehistoric	BR113
	Disgwylfa round cairn	Round cairn	The Vale of Grwyney	51.9045°N 3.0776°W, SO259234		Prehistoric	BR314
	Maen Llwyd standing stone	Standing stone	The Vale of Grwyney	51.9418°N 3.1274°W, SO226276		Prehistoric	BR312
	Mynydd Pen-y-fal round cairns	Round cairn	The Vale of Grwyney	51.8642°N 3.0785°W, SO258189		Prehistoric	BR318
	Mynydd Troed, round cairn on S end of	Round cairn	The Vale of Grwyney	51.9356°N 3.1947°W, SO179270		Prehistoric	BR315
	Nant yr Ychen round cairn	Round cairn	The Vale of Grwyney	51.9227°N 3.0954°W, SO247254		Prehistoric	BR313
	Pen y Gadair Fawr platform cairn	Platform Cairn	The Vale of Grwyney	51.952°N 3.1226°W, SO229287		Prehistoric	BR311
	Standing Stone N of Golden Grove	Standing stone	The Vale of Grwyney	51.8537°N 3.1051°W, SO239178		Prehistoric	BR171
	Garn Wen Round Cairn	Round cairn	Trallong	52.0551°N 3.556°W, SN934407		Prehistoric	BR103
	Maen Richard Prehistoric Standing Stone	Standing stone	Trallong	52.001°N 3.5055°W, SN967346		Prehistoric	BR270
	Stone Circle and Round Cairn W of Ynyshir	Cairn	Trallong	52.0321°N 3.5744°W, SN920382		Prehistoric	BR068
	Twyn Cerrig-Cadarn Round Cairn	Round barrow	Trallong	52.0355°N 3.5351°W, SN947385		Prehistoric	BR105
	Y Crug Round Barrow SSW of Aber-Criban	Round barrow	Trallong	52.0295°N 3.5324°W, SN949378		Prehistoric	BR106
	Banc Paderau Round Cairn	Round cairn	Treflys	52.1592°N 3.6448°W, SN875524		Prehistoric	BR149
	Garn Wen Round Cairn	Round cairn	Treflys	52.1662°N 3.6049°W, SN903532		Prehistoric	BR386
	Pen-y-Garn-Goch Long Barrow	Round cairn	Treflys	52.1395°N 3.6309°W, SN884502		Prehistoric	BR066
	Aberyscir Round Cairn	Round cairn	Yscir	51.9644°N 3.4732°W, SN988305		Prehistoric	BR139
	Battle Standing Stone	Standing stone	Yscir	51.9653°N 3.4478°W, SO006306		Prehistoric	BR138
	Fennifach Standing Stone	Standing stone	Yscir	51.9614°N 3.4317°W, SO017301		Prehistoric	BR189
	Carn yr Arian Cairn	Cairn	Ystradfellte	51.8012°N 3.54°W, SN939125		Prehistoric	BR244
	Carnau Gwynion Cairn Cemetery	Cairn cemetery	Ystradfellte	51.8141°N 3.5647°W, SN922139		Prehistoric	BR328
	Cefn Esgair-Carnau Burnt Mound	Burnt mound	Ystradfellte	51.8182°N 3.4851°W, SN977143		Prehistoric	BR411
	Cefn Esgair-Carnau round cairn (N)	Round cairn	Ystradfellte	51.8227°N 3.4784°W, SN982148		Prehistoric	BR323
	Cefn Esgair-Carnau round cairn (S)	Round cairn	Ystradfellte	51.8208°N 3.4804°W, SN980146		Prehistoric	BR325
	Cefn Esgair-Carnau round cairn and long hut	Round cairn	Ystradfellte	51.8212°N 3.4789°W, SN981146		Prehistoric	BR324
	Cefn Esgair-Carnau Round Cairns	Round cairn	Ystradfellte	51.8105°N 3.4888°W, SN974134		Prehistoric	BR134
	Glog Las round cairn	Round cairn	Ystradfellte	51.8182°N 3.5104°W, SN959143		Prehistoric	BR344
	Mynydd y Garn round cairn	Round cairn	Ystradfellte	51.8124°N 3.5145°W, SN956137		Prehistoric	BR345
	Round Cairn NW of Blaen-Nedd Isaf	Round cairn	Ystradfellte	51.8199°N 3.5865°W, SN907146		Prehistoric	BR169
	Sand Hill ring cairn	Ring cairn	Ystradfellte	51.8291°N 3.5992°W, SN898157		Prehistoric	BR332
	Sand Hill round cairn	Round cairn	Ystradfellte	51.823°N 3.6107°W, SN890150		Prehistoric	BR331
	Twyn yr Odynau round cairn	Round cairn	Ystradfellte	51.8241°N 3.5256°W, SN949150		Prehistoric	BR343
	Waun Tincer round cairn	Round cairn	Ystradfellte	51.8249°N 3.4941°W, SN971150		Prehistoric	BR342
	Banwen Gwys Round Cairns	Round cairn	Ystradgynlais	51.8499°N 3.7469°W, SN797182		Prehistoric	BR353
	Bryn Llechwen ring cairn	Ring cairn	Ystradgynlais	51.7792°N 3.7187°W, SN815103		Prehistoric	BR327
	Bwlch y Ddeuwynt Round Cairn	Round cairn	Ystradgynlais	51.8506°N 3.7606°W, SN788183		Prehistoric	BR352
	Dorwen standing stone	Standing stone	Ystradgynlais	51.8133°N 3.7813°W, SN773142		Prehistoric	BR333
	Llwyncwmstabl round cairn	Round cairn	Ystradgynlais	51.822°N 3.7733°W, SN778151		Prehistoric	BR334
	Lorfa Stone Circle	Stone circle	Ystradgynlais	51.8203°N 3.7627°W, SN786149		Prehistoric	BR388
Slwch Camp ramparts	Slwch Camp	Hillfort	Brecon	51.9462°N 3.3745°W, SO056284		Prehistoric	BR038
	Llyswen Camp	Hillfort	Bronllys	52.0327°N 3.2732°W, SO127379		Prehistoric	BR085
	Twyn-y-Gaer	Hillfort	Cray	51.9248°N 3.5682°W, SN922263		Prehistoric	BR035
	Llanfilo Camp	Hillfort	Felin-fach	51.9859°N 3.2916°W, SO113327		Prehistoric	BR040
	Western Camp	Enclosure	Felin-fach	51.9854°N 3.2963°W, SO110326		Prehistoric	BR039
	Craig Cerrig-Gleisiad Prehistoric Settlement	Unenclosed hut circle	Glyn Tarell	51.8892°N 3.5054°W, SN964222		Prehistoric	BR267
	Enclosure West of Nant Cwm Llwch	Enclosure - Domestic	Glyn Tarell	51.9077°N 3.452°W, SO002242		Prehistoric	BR242
	Rhyd Uchaf Hillfort	Hillfort	Glyn Tarell	51.8493°N 3.4714°W, SN987177		Prehistoric	BR241
	Waunfaeog Hillfort	Hillfort	Glyn Tarell	51.911°N 3.4654°W, SN992246		Prehistoric	BR243
	Gwernyfed Park Camp	Hillfort	Gwernyfed	52.0308°N 3.2038°W, SO175376		Prehistoric	BR159
	Twyn-y-Gaer	Enclosure	Honddu Isaf	52.0077°N 3.3788°W, SO054352		Prehistoric	BR034
	Pen-llys Earthwork	Enclosure	Llanafan Fawr	52.2152°N 3.4674°W, SN998584		Prehistoric	BR096
	Bipartite enclosure 1 km SSE of Pen Allt-Mawr, Cwm Banw	Enclosure - Agriculture	Llanfihangel Cwmdu with Bwlch and Cathedine	51.9044°N 3.145°W, SO213234		Prehistoric	BR418
	Bwlch Enclosure	Enclosure - Defensive	Llanfihangel Cwmdu with Bwlch and Cathedine	51.894°N 3.2347°W, SO151224		Prehistoric	BR271
	Coed y Gaer	Enclosure	Llanfihangel Cwmdu with Bwlch and Cathedine	51.9088°N 3.199°W, SO176240		Prehistoric	BR115
	Kidney-shaped enclosure 1 km SE of Pen Allt-Mawr, Cwm Banw	Enclosure - Agriculture	Llanfihangel Cwmdu with Bwlch and Cathedine	51.9083°N 3.1405°W, SO216239		Prehistoric	BR417
	Myarth Camp	Hillfort	Llanfihangel Cwmdu with Bwlch and Cathedine	51.879°N 3.2026°W, SO173207		Prehistoric	BR116
	Coed y Brenin Enclosure	Enclosure - Domestic	Llanfrynach	51.9063°N 3.3592°W, SO065239		Prehistoric	BR245
	Coed y Caerau Camp	Hillfort	Llanfrynach	51.9066°N 3.3543°W, SO069239		Prehistoric	BR151
	Plas-y-Gaer Camp	Hillfort	Llanfrynach	51.9119°N 3.4074°W, SO032246		Prehistoric	BR154
	Twyn Llechfaen Hillfort	Hillfort	Llanfrynach	51.9529°N 3.3369°W, SO082291		Prehistoric	BR247
	Coed Pentwyn Hillfort	Hillfort	Llangattock	51.8388°N 3.1717°W, SO193162		Prehistoric	BR190
	Ffawyddog Gaer	Hillfort	Llangattock	51.8587°N 3.1692°W, SO195184		Prehistoric	BR060
Allt yr Esgair summit	Allt yr Esgair Camp	Hillfort	Llangors	51.912°N 3.2724°W, SO125244		Prehistoric	BR153
	Crugian Bach Enclosure	Enclosure	Llanwrthwl	52.2494°N 3.5677°W, SN930624		Prehistoric	BR422
	Prehistoric Enclosure & Settlement Site on Craig y Llysiau	Enclosure	Llanwrthwl	52.2378°N 3.6332°W, SN885612		Prehistoric	BR209
	Enclosure 500m W of Dixies Corner	Enclosure	Maescar	52.0163°N 3.6482°W, SN869366		Prehistoric	BR218
	Corn y Fan Camp	Hillfort	Merthyr Cynog	52.0079°N 3.4801°W, SN985354		Prehistoric	BR051
	Cornelau Uchaf Enclosure	Enclosure	Merthyr Cynog	52.0522°N 3.4167°W, SO029402		Prehistoric	BR202
	Gaer Fach	Hillfort	Merthyr Cynog	52.0193°N 3.4452°W, SO009366		Prehistoric	BR053
	Gaer Fawr	Hillfort	Merthyr Cynog	52.0319°N 3.429°W, SO020380		Prehistoric	BR052
	Castell Dinas	Hillfort	Talgarth	51.9631°N 3.1965°W, SO178300		Prehistoric	BR015
	Enclosure on Cockit Hill	Hillfort	Talgarth	51.9419°N 3.2229°W, SO160277		Prehistoric	BR250
	Enclosure West of Sorgwm	Enclosure - Defensive	Talgarth	51.9387°N 3.2166°W, SO164273		Prehistoric	BR251
	Talgarth Camp	Hillfort	Talgarth	51.9858°N 3.2306°W, SO155326		Prehistoric	BR062
	Cwm Criban Prehistoric Settlement	Hut circle settlement	Talybont-on-Usk	51.8119°N 3.3509°W, SO069134		Prehistoric	BR254
	Enclosure W of Allt yr Esgair	Enclosure	Talybont-on-Usk	51.9095°N 3.2762°W, SO123242		Prehistoric	BR197
	Tump Wood Camp	Hillfort	Talybont-on-Usk	51.885°N 3.2906°W, SO112215		Prehistoric	BR036
	Tyle Clydach Hillfort	Hillfort	Talybont-on-Usk	51.8871°N 3.3129°W, SO097217		Prehistoric	BR253
	Y Gaer, Dol-y-Gaer	Hillfort	Talybont-on-Usk	51.8237°N 3.3662°W, SO059147		Prehistoric	BR123
	Craig-y-Rhiwarth Hillfort	Hillfort	Tawe-Uchaf	51.8282°N 3.6759°W, SN845157		Prehistoric	BR246
	Hut Circle West of Saith Maen	Unenclosed hut circle settlement	Tawe-Uchaf	51.8224°N 3.7005°W, SN828151		Prehistoric	BR256
	Coed Cefn Hillfort	Hillfort	The Vale of Grwyney	51.8606°N 3.1222°W, SO228185		Prehistoric	BR061
Crug Hywel - Table Mountain	Crug Hywel Camp	Hillfort	The Vale of Grwyney	51.8792°N 3.1264°W, SO225206		Prehistoric	BR128
	Twyn-y-Gaer	Hillfort	Trallong	51.9416°N 3.4707°W, SN990280		Prehistoric	BR043
	Twyn-y-Gaer	Hillfort	Trallong	51.9644°N 3.5011°W, SN969306		Prehistoric	BR044
	Coed Fenni-Fach Camp	Hillfort	Yscir	51.9547°N 3.4363°W, SO013294		Prehistoric	BR042
View from Pen-y-crug	Pen-y-Crug	Hillfort	Yscir	51.9632°N 3.4142°W, SO029303		Prehistoric	BR063
	Dyffryn Nedd	Enclosure	Ystradfellte	51.8029°N 3.5772°W, SN913127		Prehistoric	BR188
	Gelli-nedd Hillfort	Hillfort	Ystradfellte	51.8139°N 3.5718°W, SN917139		Prehistoric	BR248
	Settlement East of Afon Llia	Settlement	Ystradfellte	51.8507°N 3.5572°W, SN928180		Prehistoric	BR259
	Ton Teg Hut Settlement	House platform	Ystradfellte	51.8382°N 3.4989°W, SN968165		Prehistoric	BR407

Scheduled Monuments in Powys, Wales.
=Neolithic =Bronze Age =Iron Age

== See also ==
- List of Cadw properties
- List of castles in Wales
- List of hill forts in Wales
- Historic houses in Wales
- List of monastic houses in Wales
- List of museums in Wales
- List of Roman villas in Wales
