= Yscir with Honddu Isaf and Llanddew =

Coordinates: 51.9922°N 3.4899°W

- Electoral ward
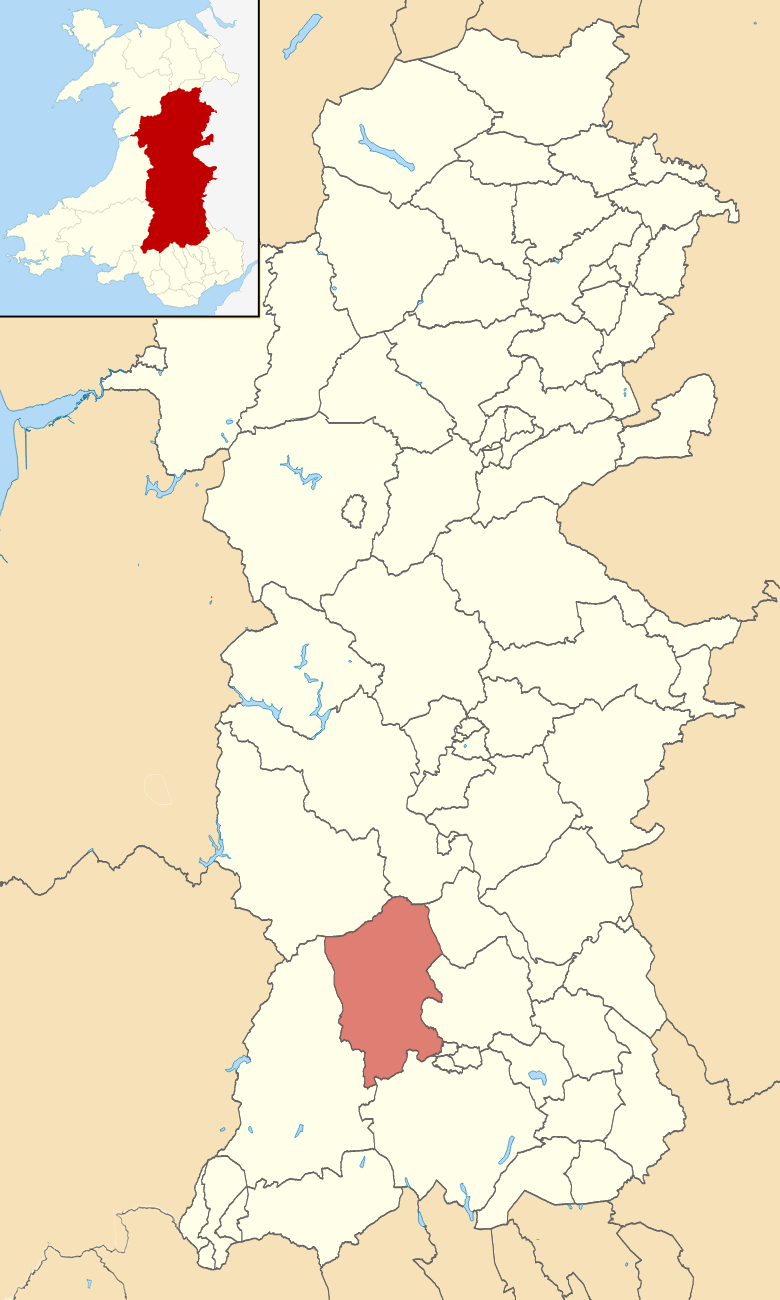
- Location of pre-2022 Yscir ward in Powys
- Population: 1,038 (2011 census)
- Principal area: Powys
- Country: Wales
- Sovereign state: United Kingdom
- UK Parliament: Brecon, Radnor and Cwm Tawe
- Senedd Cymru – Welsh Parliament: Brecon and Radnorshire
- Councillors: 1 (County)

Yscir with Honddu Isaf and Llanddew (formerly known as Yscir) is an electoral ward in southern Powys, Wales. It covers five local government communities and elects a councillor to Powys County Council.

== Description ==
The Yscir with Honddu Isaf and Llanddew ward covers the sparsely populated communities of Honddu Isaf, Llanddew, Merthyr Cynog, Trallong and Yscir, including the valleys of the Nant Brân, Afon Honddu and Afon Ysgir. The River Usk partly borders the ward to the south. The Llanwrtyd Wells ward borders to the north, Bronllys and Felin-fach to the east, Maescar/Llywel to the west and Talybont-on-Usk to the south. The town of Brecon borders the southeast corner of the ward.

According to the 2011 UK Census the population of the Yscir ward was 1,038.

Following a boundary review to improve electoral parity, the Yscir ward was augmented with the addition of the communities of Honddu Isaf and Llanddew (from the former Felin-fach ward), with the ward name being changed as a result to Yscir with Honddu Isaf and Llanddew.

== Events ==
In early 2018 county councillor Iain McIntosh visited every house in the Yscir ward to sign a petition demanding high speed broadband. Yscir had some of the poorest internet connectivity in Wales.

== County elections ==
Since the May 1995 local government election, Yscir has been represented by one county councillor on Powys County Council. Councillor Dorothy Thomas, an independent, represented the ward until 2017. She retired before the May 2017 elections.

In May 2017 the Yscir ward made news by being the only ward in Wales not to hold an election, because no candidates had come forward for the vacant seat. This led to a second call for nominations and a by-election arranged to elect a new councillor. Six candidates came forward and, on 22 June 2017, Conservative Party candidate Iain McIntosh won the contest. McIntosh had stood unsuccessfully in Brecon's St John ward in May. Former Conservative Steve Davies, stood as an independent in the by-election and, with only two votes, received possibly the lowest vote in any Powys Council election. In March 2025 McIntosh left the Conservatives and joined Reform UK.
