= Upper Chapel, Powys =

Village in Wales

Coordinates: 52°03′N 3°27′W

Upper Chapel (Welsh: Capel Uchaf) is a hamlet in the southern part of the county of Powys in mid Wales. It was formerly in the county of Brecknockshire. It lies on the B4520 road from Brecon to Builth Wells, in the valley of the River Honddu. The south-flowing Honddu cuts deeply into the uplands of Mynydd Epynt north of Brecon. To the north and west of Upper Chapel lies the British Army's Sennybridge Training Area.

The hamlet lies 3 miles (5 km) to the north of its sister settlement, Lower Chapel (Capel Isaf), in the same valley. Upper Chapel lies within the community of Merthyr Cynog, whilst Lower Chapel lies within the neighbouring Honddu Isaf.

Slightly to the north of the village the lane forks, with one way descending to the A483 near Llangamarch, and the main lane continuing ahead to Builth Wells. Nearby villages or hamlets are:

- Merthyr Cynog (connected by a lane which climbs over the hill to the west)
- Castell Madoc, Lower Chapel, Pwllgloyw and Llandefaelog Fach to the south, on the road to Brecon
- The hamlet of Pentref Dolau Honddu to the north

Upper Chapel has a community hall called Merthyr Cynog Community Hall, which hosts various local events and meetings.

Upper Chapel used to have a pub, the Plough and Harrow, but it no longer operates. The scientist Michael Faraday took refreshment here on the way to Builth Wells on July 2, 1819, having been misdirected to Hay-on-Wye earlier in the day.
