= Pen-y-cae =

Pen-y-cae may refer to one of these places in Wales:

- Pen-y-cae, Wrexham, a village and community in the county borough of Wrexham
- Pen-y-cae, Bridgend
- Pen-y-cae, Neath Port Talbot
- Pen-y-cae, Powys, a hamlet in the community of Tawe Uchaf in the south-west of Powys
