= Castell Madoc =

Coordinates: 52.022°N 3.422°W

Castell Madoc is a small rural village in Brecon, Powys. The village lies next to Mynydd Epynt, on Afon Honddu, one of the most important tributaries of the River Usk.

The village is located next to a country lane that climbs towards Mynydd Epynt, situated about 5 miles south. The surrounding villages are Capel Uchaf (to the north), and Capel Isaf, Pwllgloyw and Llandefaelog Fach to the south, on the road to Brecon.
