= Battle of Brecon =

Battle during the Norman conquest of Wales

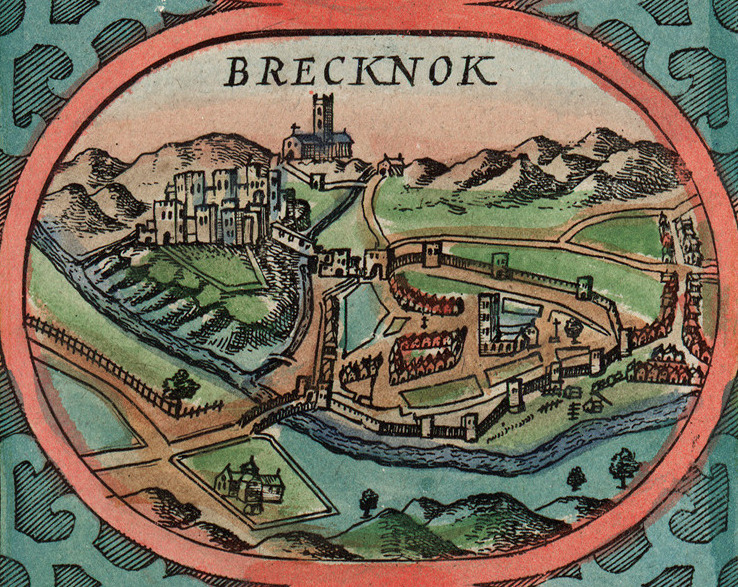
Brecon, as depicted in the “County maps of Wales” written in 1610 by John Speeds

In the Easter of 1093 (some sources state 1094), the Battle of Brecon took place between the forces of Rhys Ap Tewdr, King of Deheubarth and Bleddyn ap Maenyrch, King of Brycheiniog against Bernard de Neufmarché and his mounted knights.

== Before the battle (Prelude) ==
In 1066 the Normans led by William the Conqueror invaded the kingdom of England and took the throne of England. The first Norman conquests into Wales took place between 1070 and 1071, when William FitzOsbern created the motte-and-bailey castle in Clifford village. The castle is not actually in Wales but was a staging ground for invasions and incursions across the border. In 1088 the Lord of Hereford, Bernard de Neufmarché invaded and conquered parts of Brycheiniog (Brecon). He defeated King Bleddyn Ap Maenyrch at the Battle of Caer-Bannau. Bernard began to build a castle using stone from a nearby Roman fort called Caer-Bannau which used to belong to Bleddyn, this castle became Brecon Castle which still stands today.

== Battle ==
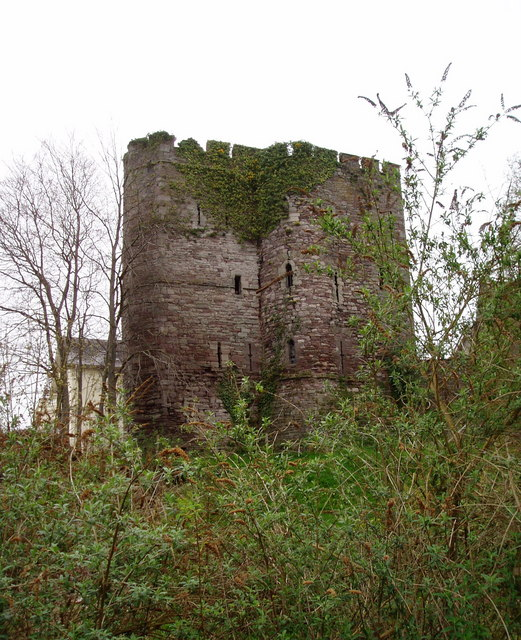
Brecon castle, built around 1093/1094

In the Easter week of 1093 (17-23 April) Rhys Ap Tewdwr (who had returned to Wales) and Bleddyn Ap Maenyrch returned and decided to attack Brecon whilst the castle was still being constructed. The battle took place on the field where Brecon Cathedral stands today. The Normans held the high ground whilst the Welsh army was on the low ground. The battle commenced and Bleddyn led a charge up the hill to the Norman position, however this attack failed and the Welsh were defeated by the mounted knights. Rhys Ap Tewdr was slain at the battle, his death marked the end of Welsh resistance in Southern wales and it cemented Bernard's ownership of Brecon. Bleddyn is said to have died shortly after (most likely executed or perhaps died of wounds from the battle. It is said that the Norman's superior discipline won the battle.

== Aftermath ==
There are multiple rumours about the death of Rhys, some say that he was slain on the battlefield and that Brecon Priory (now Brecon Cathredral) was constructed where he fell. Other sources claim that he was slain at Penrhys south of Brecon. It is more likely that he was slain near where Brecon Cathedral is today. Rhys Ap Tewdr was buried at Strata Florida Cathredral. It is most likely that his body was moved from his resting place to the abbey (It is possible he was originally buried at Penrhys or Brecon and then moved). After the battle of Brecon the Marcher Lords where able to conquer and take parts of southern Wales; Bernard de Neufmarché gave land to multiple of his victorious knights who won the battle including a certain knight by the name of “ Sir Reynold Awbre”. (There were 13 knights in total who aided Bernard in his conquest of Brecon, Awbre being one of those.) After the battle was won the Normans decided to strengthen their hold over Wales and built multiple castles, including Brecon Castle, Tredustan castle, Crickhowell Castle, Urishay Castle and Snodhill Castle.

== Participants ==
=== Norman side ===
- Bernard de Neufmarché, Lord of Brecon and Hereford.
- Sir Reynold Awbre/Aubrey, Sire of Abercynfig and Slwch (Slough in Powys)
- Sir John Scull, Sire of Bryn Bolgoed and Crai
- Sir Peter Gunter, Sire of Gunterstone (perhaps modern Gileston)
- Sir Humphrey Ffergill (Burghill/Burchill), Sire of Crickhowell
- Sir Miles Piegard (Picard) Sire of Ischergrog and founder of Tretower castle
- Sir John Waldebieffe (Waldegrave), Sire of Lanbanffoag
- Sir Humphrey Sollers, Sire of Tredustan and Dorstone castle (perhaps built the earthworks and the motte remnants at Tredustan)
- Sir Richard de Boyes (De Bois) Sire of Treboyer
- Sir Walter Havard Sire of Defynnog and Pontwilyim (Possible ancestor to John Havard, founder of Harvard)
- Sir Hugh Surdnan, Sire of Aberisker
- Sir Philip Walwin (Walwyn), Sire of the Hay, created Hay castle (specifically Hay Tump Castle, an earthwork which was the original castle of Hay, before being abandoned and the castle moved to the present site).
- Sir Richard Paglin Sire of the manor of Peytyns

=== Welsh side ===
- Rhys Ap Tewdr, King of Deheubarth
- Bleddyn Ap Maenyrch, King of Brycheiniog (Brecon)
- Multiple Welsh archers (unnamed)

Both sides had many more participants, however there names have not been recorded, the rest of the participants were probability peasants (Welsh peasants and English peasants), who would have been the ground forces.
