= Aberysgir Castle =

Castle in Powys, Wales

Coordinates: 51.9554°N 3.4560°W

Aberysgir Castle is a mound, or motte and bailey castle of the Middle Ages – but is missing the usual protective bailey. It is located at Aberysgir, Powys (grid reference SO000295). Most of the mound was constructed between the end of the 11th century and second half the 12th century out of soil and stone, with a ditch around them.

The castle is registered with Cadw with the number SAM: BR021 .

The biggest cluster of similar mounds in the UK are in what is now known as Shropshire, Cheshire, Herefordshire, Powys and Flintshire.
