= Afon Gwydderig =

River in Powys and Carmarthenshire, Wales

Coordinates: 51.99278°N 3.78703°W

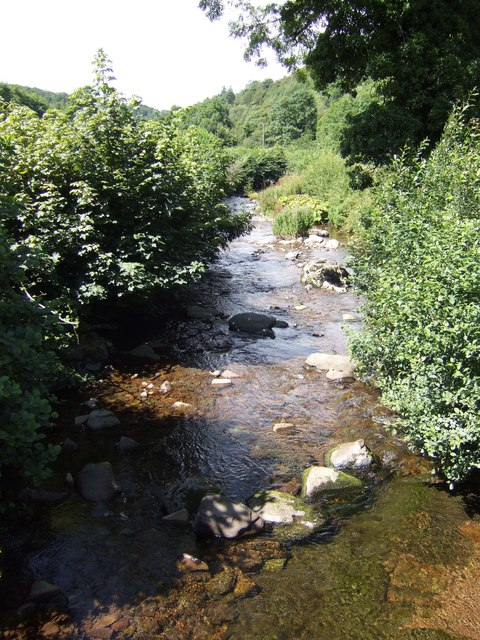
Afon Gwydderig

The Afon Gwydderig is a tributary of the Afon Brân. It rises as the Nant Gwydderig on the southern slopes of Mynydd Bwlch-y-groes, about 3 miles (4.8 km) North of the small village of Llywel, Powys. The A40 runs next to the river from Llywel as far as Llandovery, Carmarthenshire.

The Gwydderig crosses the boundary between Powys and Carmarthenshire at the village of Halfway. It joins the Brân in Llandovery, Carmarthenshire, about 1 1/2 miles (2.4 km) upstream of the confluence of the Brân with the River Towy. The Gwydderig therefore forms part of the Towy's catchment basin and drains into the Bristol Channel at the Towy estuary.
