= Llanspyddid =

Hamlet in Powys, Wales

Coordinates: 51°57′N 3°26′W

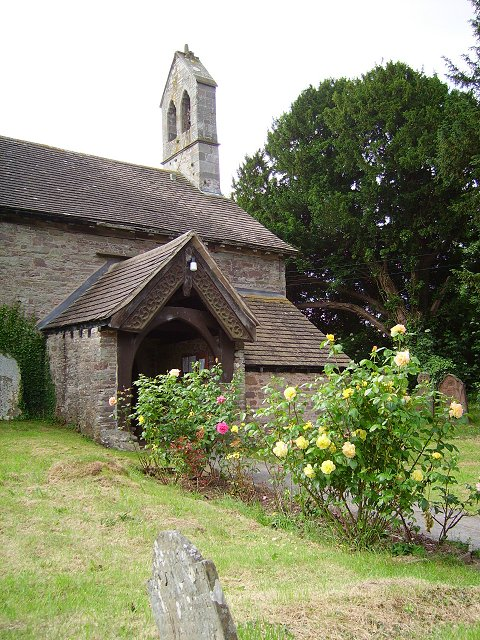
Llanspyddid church

Llanspyddid is a small village just west of Brecon within the Brecon Beacons National Park. It lies within the valley of the River Usk in the community of Glyn Tarell in the county of Powys, Wales. Llanspyddid sits on the A40 trunk road between Brecon and Llandovery. The Welsh name signifies the 'church of Saint Ysbyddyd', though the village church is in fact dedicated to Saint Cadog.
