= Afon Ysgir =

River in Powys, Wales

Coordinates: 51°57′26″N 3°27′16″W

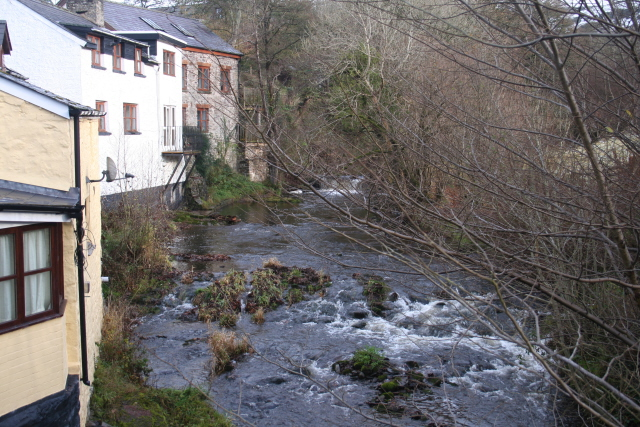
- Afon Ysgir at Pont Faen

Afon Ysgir is a river which rises on the southern slopes of Mynydd Epynt in Powys, Wales. The tributaries known as Ysgir Fawr and Ysgir Fechan flow past the hamlets of Pont Rhyd-y-berry and Merthyr Cynog to combine at Pont-faen and continue past the village of Battle to join the River Usk at Aberyscir.

Its upper reaches are within the military training area of SENTA, the British Army's Sennybridge Training Area.

Near its mouth is a motte, the historic church at Aberyscir and east of the river, the Roman fort of CICVCIVM or Brecon Gaer. Along with other tributaries of the Usk, the river is designated as a special area of conservation or 'SAC' for various species of fish including lamprey, the twaite shad and the European bullhead.
