= Glangrwyney =

Village in Powys, Wales

Coordinates: 51.8403°N 3.1046°W

Glangrwyney or Glangrwyne is a village 2 miles (3.2 km) southeast of Crickhowell in Powys, Wales. The village is where the Grwyne Fawr has its confluence with the River Usk, southeast of the Sugar Loaf and at the junction of the road from Gilwern with the A40 trunk road. Glangrwyney is in the Vale of Grwyney Community for administrative purposes. The village is built upon the sands and gravels of a dissected alluvial fan which extends into the floodplain of the Usk, together with till derived from the former Usk Valley glacier.

Facilities in the village include a village hall and The Bell public house. The former army training camp of Cwrt y Gollen is on the western edge of the village.

The village's name was previously spelt as Llangrwyney or Llangrwyne.
