= Arthur Stanley Tritton =

British Arabist (1881–1973)

- Born: 25 February 1881
- Died: 8 November 1973 (aged 92)

Academic background
- Education: Mansfield College, Oxford

Academic work
- Discipline: Arabist
- Institutions: Edinburgh University (1911–16); Glasgow University (1920); Aligarh University (1921–30); SOAS (1931–46)
- Main interests: Islam; Arabic; Hebrew
- Notable works: Teach Yourself Arabic (1943)

Arthur Stanley Tritton (25 February 1881 – 8 November 1973) was a British Arabist. He wrote a number of books on Islam and its history, and from 1938 to 1946 was Professor of Arabic at the School of Oriental and African Studies.

== Life ==
Tritton was born on 25 February 1881. His father was the senior pastor of a Congregational church in Great Yarmouth, but when Tritton was still young the family moved to Wandsworth.

In 1900, he was admitted to Mansfield College, Oxford, where he studied theology. He later also studied briefly under Julius Wellhausen at the University of Göttingen.

He taught at the Friends' Mission School in Brummana in Lebanon, and then at the universities of Edinburgh and Glasgow. He received his D. Litt. from Edinburgh in 1918.

In 1921, he was appointed Professor of Arabic at Aligarh University in India, where he remained for the rest of the decade.

In 1931, he was made Lecturer in Arabic at the School of Oriental Studies. Two years later, he was promoted to Reader, and in 1938 he succeeded H. A. R. Gibb as Professor of Arabic and Head of Department. In 1943, his popular introduction to the Arabic language was published in the Teach Yourself series. He retired in 1946, but continued to teach for a time as a part-time lecturer.

He died on 8 November 1973, at the age of ninety-two.

== Published works ==
Tritton wrote six books, all of which were published under the name A. S. Tritton.

- The Rise of the Imams of Sanaa (1925)
- The Caliphs and Their Non-Muslim Subjects: A Critical Study of the Covenant of ‘Umar (1930)
- Teach Yourself Arabic (1943)
- Muslim Theology (1947)
- Islam: Belief and Practices (1951)
- Materials on Muslim Education in the Middle Ages (1957)
