= Teach Yourself =

Book publishing imprint

- Company type: Book-publishing imprint
- Founded: 1938
- Headquarters: London, England
- Products: Self-instruction books
- Parent: Hodder Education
- Website: library.teachyourself.com

Teach Yourself is an imprint of Hodder Education and formerly a series published by the English Universities Press (a subsidiary company of Hodder & Stoughton) that specialises in self-instruction books. The series, which began in 1938, is most famous for its language-education books, but its titles in mathematics (including algebra and calculus) are also best-sellers, and over its long history the series has covered a great many other subjects as well. "A Concise Guide to Teach Yourself", compiled by A R Taylor, was published in 1958 and listed all the titles up until then.

== Overview ==
A photo of a standard Teach Yourself book from 1943

Teach Yourself books from the 1980s (left) and 2000s

The Teach Yourself books were published from 1938 until 1966 under the imprint English Universities Press, owned by Hodder & Stoughton. Leonard Cutts (1904-1992) was overall editor from the start, and he remained the editor until 1964. Most titles published during the Second World War were aimed at helping the British nation to survive as well as improving knowledge in the subjects that would advance the war effort. Teach Yourself to Fly by Nigel Tangye was published on the eve of the Second World War. It was immediately recommended by the Air Ministry to prospective RAF pilots. Teach Yourself Radio Communication and Teach Yourself Air Navigation were added to the list in 1941. There was a big demand for these books, especially as supplies were constrained by wartime paper shortages. In June 1941 The Times reported that "sailors, soldiers and airmen have helped to bring the figures of Teach Yourself Mathematics (by John Davidson, 1938) and Teach Yourself Trigonometry (by Percival Abbott, 1940) to nearly 50,000 apiece". Barely two months later the number had risen to 80,000 each.

By the 50th anniversary in 1988 some 40 million copies of the Teach Yourself series had been sold, with the books generating a turnover of over £1 million.

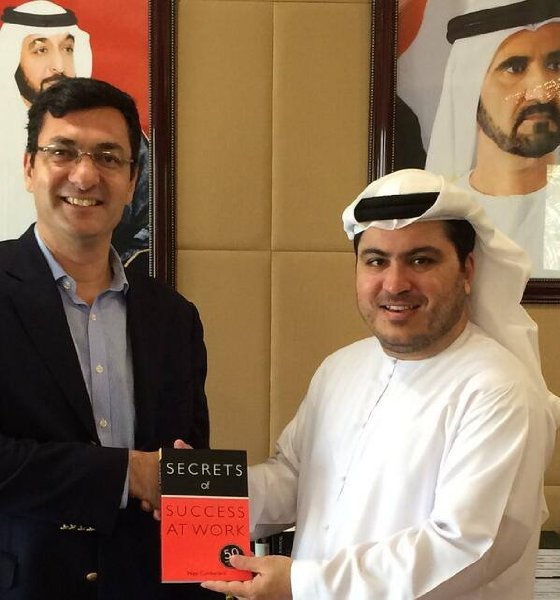
The author of a Teach Yourself book entitled Secrets of Success at Work, Nigel Cumberland (left)

Like many similar series, Teach Yourself has always used a common design for all of its books. Most older titles are covered with a distinctive yellow and blue, (formerly black), dust jacket, but over the years the publisher has changed the cover design several times, using an all-blue paperback format during the 1980s, a larger photographic or painted front cover with a black stripe containing the title in the 1990s, and recently adopting a yellow rounded rectangle with a black border as their primary logo in the 21st century.

== The Original Series (1938–1966) ==
The earliest (EUP) volumes in the series were published in 1938 priced at two shillings and sixpence. The first five books to be published were adaptations from earlier works, but subsequently all were newly commissioned. The original numbering scheme reached to over 700. Notable early titles included:

- Teach Yourself About the Greeks by J. C. Stobart, was abridged from his full length work The Glory that was Greece (1911).
- Teach Yourself Amateur Acting by John Bourne, said to have been read by Michael Caine at the start of his career.
- Teach Yourself Arabic, first published in 1943, was written by Arthur Stanley Tritton. Tritton wrote a number of books on Islam and its history, and from 1938 to 1946 was Professor of Arabic at the School of Oriental and African Studies.
- Teach Yourself Astronomy was written by the noted British astronomer David Stanley Evans in 1957. At the time he was Chief Assistant at the Royal Observatory Cape of Good Hope.
- Teach Yourself Biology was written in 1940 by the pioneering woman physician Mary Elizabeth Phillips (with Lucy Ellen Cox).
- Teach Yourself Colloquial Arabic, first published in 1962, was written by Terence Frederick Mitchell, a British linguist at the University of Leeds.
- Teach Yourself Embroidery, one of the earliest titles in 1938, was written by Mary Thomas (1889-1948), who was editor of The Needlewoman in the 1920s and 1930s.
- Teach Yourself Irish, first published in 1961, was written by the Celtic scholars Myles Dillon and Donncha Ó Cróinín.
- Teach Yourself to Think, published in 1938, was written by R. W. Jepson, headmaster of the Mercers' School.
- Teach Yourself Turkish, first published in 1953, was written by Geoffrey Lewis, the first professor of the Turkish language at the University of Oxford.

Subjects covered in the series ranged from the vocational (Teach Yourself Banking by John Burgess Parker) to practical home help (Teach Yourself Bringing up Children, Teach Yourself Dressmaking, Teach Yourself Gas in the House, The Teach Yourself Letter Writer), to hobbyist (Teach Yourself Bee-Keeping, Teach Yourself Etching), and language learning (with Arabic, Chinese, French, German, Greek and Hindustani among the earliest titles). The books even stretched to highly technical subjects (Teach Yourself Chemistry, Teach Yourself Atomic Physics) and to the arts (Teach Yourself to Compose Music). One of the most extreme was Teach Yourself Jet Engines and Rocket Propulsion by Patrick Joseph McMahon, published in 1964.

A Concise Guide to Teach Yourself was published in 1958, listing all the titles then available, although the official numbering only began in 1949, so the books published before them were assigned numbers posthumously.

== Current series (1966–) ==
Books in the Teach Yourself series have been published since 1966 by Hodder & Stoughton, who shifted the format of the books to trade paperbacks in 1973. For 2010, the books had a total redesign, and were printed in colour for the first time. Today they are available around the English-speaking world and cover numerous subjects, from language education to computers, games, and other crafts and hobbies. The company now specialises in self-instruction courses through books, audio and multimedia, with a particular emphasis on languages.

=== Teach Yourself Languages series ===
The Teach Yourself Languages range is available in over 65 languages and is available at four different levels. The Teach Yourself Languages range grade the four levels used against the Common European Framework of Reference for Languages (CEFR). In their 2012 range, Teach Yourself introduced a feature called Discovery Method. After each conversation has been practised, the Discovery Method provides further explanation through focusing on usage and practice rather than the focus on rules found in the traditional inductive method.

Get Talking and Get Started Series: The first two strands, Get Talking (audio course) and Get Started, are aimed at absolute beginners and those who have not learnt a language since school. Get Talking is an all-audio course designed to teach basic speaking in a short period. Get Started In is a more comprehensive course tackling all four skills (reading, writing, listening and speaking).

- Arabic
- Brazilian Portuguese
- Cantonese
- Danish
- Dutch
- French
- German
- Greek
- Gujarati
- Hindi
- Hungarian
- Italian
- Japanese
- Korean
- Latin
- Latin American Spanish
- Mandarin Chinese
- Modern Hebrew
- Norwegian
- Polish
- Portuguese
- Russian
- Spanish
- Swedish
- Thai
- Turkish
- Vietnamese

Complete... Series: The third strand is the Complete course, which is again aimed at absolute beginners, but is longer and covers a greater range of material. The Complete range offers the broadest range of products in the Teach Yourself Languages series as it covers all 65 languages available from Teach Yourself. The Complete range includes many of the language volumes earlier included in the Teach Yourself series before the Complete language sub-series was devised.

- Afrikaans
- Arabic
- Babylonian
- Bengali
- Brazilian Portuguese
- Bulgarian
- Cantonese
- Catalan
- Croatian
- Czech
- Danish
- Dutch
- English as a Foreign Language
- Esperanto
- Estonian
- Tagalog
- Finnish
- French
- Scottish Gaelic
- German
- Greek
- Hindi
- Hungarian
- Icelandic
- Indonesian
- Irish
- Italian
- Japanese
- Korean
- Latin American Spanish
- Latvian
- Lithuanian
- Malay
- Mandarin Chinese
- Modern Hebrew
- Modern Persian
- Nepali
- Norwegian
- Panjabi
- Polish
- Portuguese
- Romanian
- Russian
- Serbian
- Spanish
- Spoken Arabic of the Gulf
- Swahili
- Swedish
- Thai
- Turkish
- Ukrainian
- Urdu
- Vietnamese
- Welsh
- Xhosa
- Zulu

Enjoy... Series: Enjoy is the fourth level, introducing further vocabulary and grammar. This series was formerly marketed as the "Perfect your..." or "Improve your..." series.

- German
- Italian
- Norwegian
- Spanish
- French
- Esperanto

=== All That Matters ===
The All That Matters series is a series of short introductions to various subjects, intended to allow readers to "quickly discover all that matters about" their subjects. As of December 2021, its titles include:

- Ancient Egypt
- Animal Rights
- Archaeology
- Astronomy
- Atheism
- Autism Spectrum Disorder
- Bioethics
- Buddhism
- Classical World
- Cyber Crime & Warfare
- Darwin
- Democracy
- Emotion
- Energy
- Euthanasia
- Existentialism
- Free Speech
- Future Cities
- Future
- God
- History of Medicine
- Intelligence
- International Relations
- Judaism
- Love
- Mathematics
- Modern China
- Modern Japan
- Modern Korea
- Muhammad
- Philosophy
- Plato
- Political Philosophy
- Risk
- Sexuality
- Shakespeare's Comedies
- Shakespeare's Tragedies
- Space Exploration
- Stress
- Sustainability
- Terrorism
- The Renaissance
- The Romans
- Water

== See also ==
- Language education
- List of language self-study programmes
