= Mary Elizabeth Phillips (physician) =

Welsh doctor (1875–1956)

Dr Mary Elizabeth Phillips in 1919

Mary Elizabeth Phillips (1875–1956), also known as Mary Eppynt Phillips, was the first woman from Cardiff University to qualify as a medical doctor. While she was sometimes called the "first woman doctor in Wales," she herself disputed that designation.

== Early life and education ==
Mary Elizabeth Phillips was from Merthyr Cynog in Breconshire. Her father William Phillips was a farmer. She qualified as a medical doctor in 1900, after four years of study at Cardiff University (1894–1898) and practical training at the Royal Free Hospital in London.

== Career ==
Phillips spent her early career practicing in English hospitals, especially at the Leeds Maternity Hospital, where she was an honorary medical officer from 1905 to 1914.

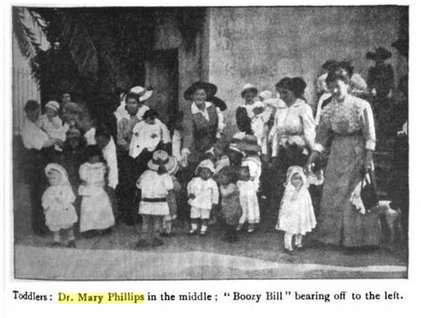
Dr Mary Phillips in Corsica in May 1917

During World War I, Phillips was invited to join the Scottish Women's Hospitals personnel at Calais, where she began serving at Christmas in 1914. She ran a typhoid hospital there, briefly, then transferred with Elsie Inglis to the Scottish Women's Hospitals operation in Serbia, where she held the rank of senior physician. She returned to Great Britain to recover her health in 1915, then gave lectures in Wales about her experiences to raise funds for the war work of the Scottish Women's Hospital. Welsh audiences were especially interested in her stories of Welsh soldiers she encountered in her work. She resumed her own hospital work in 1916, in Ajaccio, Corsica, where she would stay as Chief Medical Officer until mid-1917. Her work at Ajaccio was with women war refugees, and in May 1917 she posed proudly for a photograph with the Serbian mothers and babies she cared for during her year there. Phillips also wrote am article for 'Common Cause' detailing her work, and that of the hospital.

After the war, Mary Phillips continued to practice medicine. In 1940 she published (with Lucy Ellen Cox) Teach Yourself Biology, number ten in the long-running Teach Yourself series of self-educational books. She died in 1956, and her remains were buried in the parish churchyard in the Welsh hamlet of Merthyr Cynog.

== See also ==
- Frances Hoggan
- Mary Morris (doctor)
- List of Welsh medical pioneers
