= Pen-y-cae, Powys =

Village in Powys, Wales

Coordinates: 51.8102°N 3.6774°W

Pen-y-cae
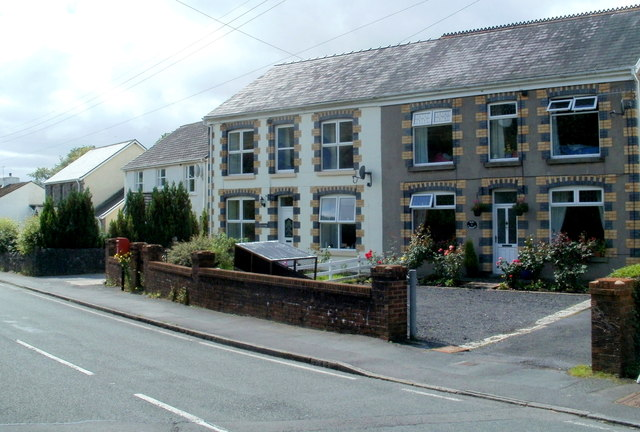
- Housing in Pen-y-cae

- Location within Powys
- OS grid reference: SN843137
- Community: Ystradgynlais
- Principal area: Powys
- Preserved county: Powys
- Country: Wales
- Sovereign state: United Kingdom
- Post town: SWANSEA
- Postcode district: SA9
- Dialling code: 01639
- Police: Dyfed-Powys
- Fire: Mid and West Wales
- Ambulance: Welsh
- UK Parliament: Brecon, Radnor and Cwm Tawe
- Senedd Cymru – Welsh Parliament: Brecon and Radnorshire

Pen-y-cae is a village in Powys, Wales in the Brecon Beacons National Park between Abercraf and Craig-y-Nos Castle, in the community of Tawe-Uchaf. The village is mostly a linear settlement along the A4067 which runs approximately parallel to the River Tawe. Pen-y-cae has a school and two pubs, the Pen-y-cae Inn in the centre of the village and the Ancient Briton, close to Ynyswen.
