= Tredustan Castle =

Castle in Wales

Coordinates: 51.9836°N 3.2537°W

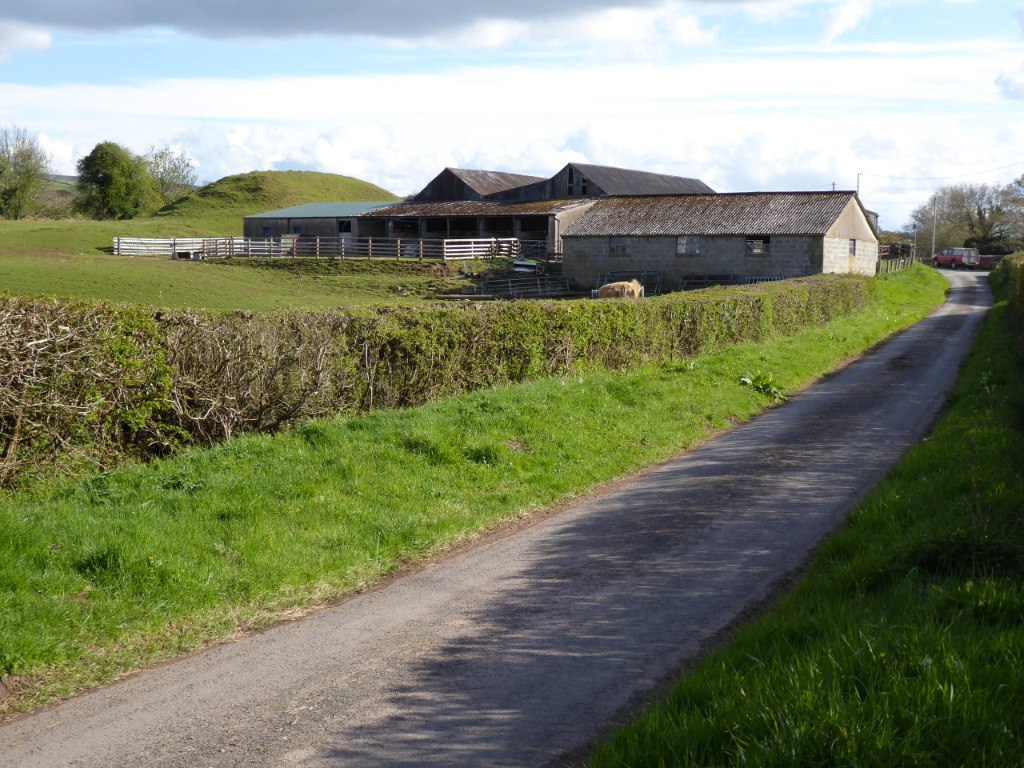
The castle mound

Tredustan Castle (also known as Tredustan motte) was a castle that used to stand in Tredustan in Wales (near to Talgarth). The mound was most likely constructed around 1094/1095 by a knight of Lord Bernard de Neufmarché called Sir Humphrey Sollers after the Battle of Brecon which was a Norman victory of the Welsh of Brycheiniog. The main use of the castle was to protect against Welsh raids and to control the populace. The castle no longer exists, and all that is left is the motte that the bailey (which was most definitely wooden) stood upon.
