= Maescar =

- Population: 965
- OS grid reference: SN 925 282
  - Cardiff: 35.4 mi (57.0 km)
  - London: 148.7 mi (239.3 km)
- Community: Maescar
- Principal area: Powys
- Country: Wales
- Sovereign state: United Kingdom
- Post town: BRECON
- Police: Dyfed-Powys
- Fire: Mid and West Wales
- Ambulance: Welsh
- List of places UK Wales Powys 51.942°N 3.566°W Map of the community

Maescar is a community in the county of Powys, Wales, and is 35.4 miles (56.9 km) from Cardiff and 148.7 miles (239.3 km) from London. It is in the historic county of Brecknockshire.

== Description ==
The villages of Defynnog and Sennybridge lie in the community of Maescar. There are around 10 round cairns and notable standing stones within the community, dating back to the Iron Age.

In 2011 the population of Maescar was 965 with 24.0% of inhabitants able to speak Welsh.

== Governance ==
Maescar has a community council with eleven locally elected or co-opted community councillors. They consider planning applications and other matters of local interest.

Maescar fall within the electoral ward called Maescar/Llywel (which also includes the neighbouring communities of Llywel and Cray). The ward elects a county councillor to sit on Powys County Council. The population of this ward at the 2011 Census was 1,703.

== See also ==
- List of localities in Wales by population
