= Yscir =

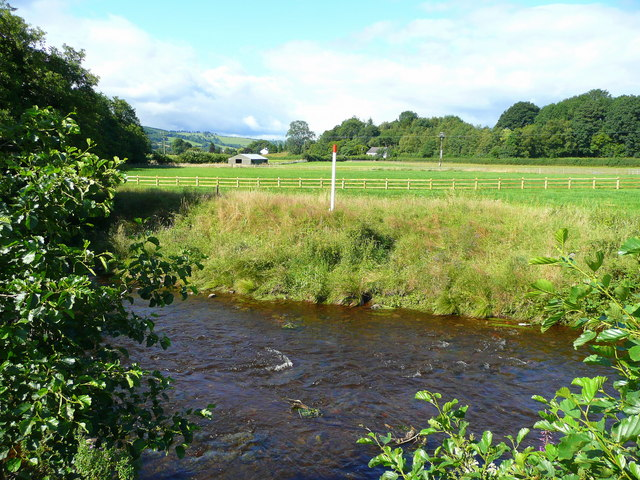
- Population: 424
- OS grid reference: SO 004 303
  - Cardiff: 35.3 mi (56.8 km)
  - London: 145.6 mi (234.3 km)
- Community: Yscir
- Principal area: Powys
- Country: Wales
- Sovereign state: United Kingdom
- Post town: Aberhonddu
- Postcode district: LD3
- Police: Dyfed-Powys
- Fire: Mid and West Wales
- Ambulance: Welsh
- Website: http://www.yscir.net/
- List of places UK Wales Powys 51.962°N 3.451°W Map of the community

Yscir (or Ysgir) is a community in the county of Powys, Wales (the historic county of Brecknockshire) and is 35.3 miles (56.7 km) from Cardiff.

Cradoc and Aberyscir are villages within the boundary of this community. Also there are the settlements of Battle and Fenni-fach. In 2011 the population of Yscir was 424 with 17.9% of them able to speak Welsh.

Aberyscir Round Cairn and two standing stones (Battle and Fennifach Standing Stones) are all Scheduled prehistoric Monuments dating back to the Celtic (pre-Roman) period.

== Governance ==
Yscir is part of the Yscir electoral ward for elections to Powys County Council. The ward includes the communities of Yscir, Merthyr Cynog and Trallong. At the 2011 Census this ward had a population of 1,038.

In the 2017 local elections it was the only ward in Wales where no candidates put themselves forward, after the sitting councillor, Gillian Thomas, retired before the election. Six candidates subsequently put themselves forward and a by-election, on the 21 June 2017, was won by the Conservative Party.

== See also ==
- List of localities in Wales by population
