= Honddu Isaf =

- Community
- Principal area: Powys
- Country: Wales
- Sovereign state: United Kingdom
- Police: Dyfed-Powys
- Fire: Mid and West Wales
- Ambulance: Welsh
- List of places UK Wales Powys 52.000°N 3.394°W Position of the community within Powys

Honddu Isaf ("Lower Honddu") is a community in Powys, Wales, situated immediately north of Brecon in the valley of the lower River Honddu, on either side of the B4520 road to Builth Wells. It is in the historic county of Brecknockshire.

== Description ==
The community is rural, and extends 9 km from north to south. It includes (in downstream order) the settlements of Castell Madoc (various spellings), Lower Chapel, Pwllgloyw, Garthbrengi, Sarnau and Llandefaelog Fach. In the census of 2011 the population was 445.
