= Llandyfaelog Fach =

Coordinates: 51.979441°N 3.410481°W

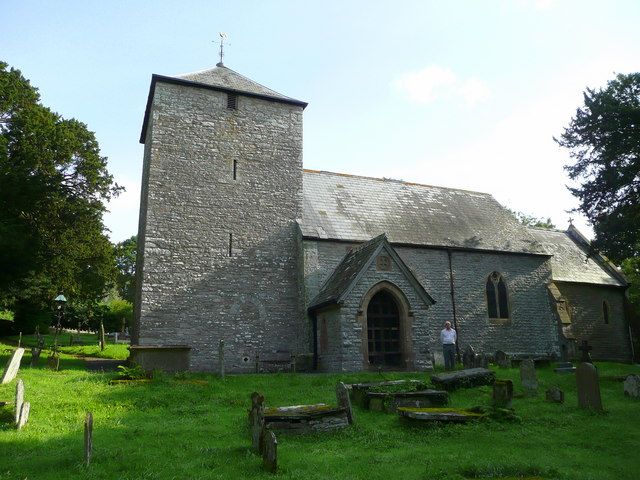
- St Maelog's Church

- Location within Powys
- Community: Honddu Isaf
- Principal area: Powys
- Preserved county: Powys
- Country: Wales
- Sovereign state: United Kingdom
- Post town: Brecon
- Postcode district: LD3
- Police: Dyfed-Powys
- Fire: Mid and West Wales
- Ambulance: Welsh

Llandyfaelog Fach (or Llandefaelog Fach) is a small village and former community, now in the community of Honddu Isaf, in Powys, Wales. It includes the surrounding areas of Glan Honddu, Sarnau, Pwllgloyw and Garthbrengy. These areas border the village. The nearest pubs and shops are in Brecon. Cradoc golf course is also nearby. The civil parish was named "Llandefaelog Fach" and was renamed on 1 April 1974 to become the community of "Llandefailog Fach", the community was abolished on 1 April 1986. At the 1971 census (one of the last before the abolition of the parish), Llandyfaelog Fach had a population of 108.

The village has a church dedicated to Saint Maelog. The church contains the Cross of Briamail, known as Croes Briamail in Welsh.

In the churchyard are the remains of a striking 1816 mausoleum in Egyptian style for the owners of the nearby Penoyre estate. This has largely collapsed recently but previously black lead coffins were visible through its iron barred windows.
