= Tawe-Uchaf =

- Community
- Principal area: Powys
- Country: Wales
- Sovereign state: United Kingdom
- Police: Dyfed-Powys
- Fire: Mid and West Wales
- Ambulance: Welsh
- List of places UK Wales Powys 51.810°N 3.654°W Map of the community

Tawe-Uchaf is a community in Powys, Wales. Situated north-east of Ystradgynlais in the upper valley of the River Tawe (hence the name), it includes the villages of Caehopkin, Coelbren, Glyntawe, Pen-y-cae, Penwyllt and Ynyswen. It had a population in 2001 of 1,516, increasing at the 2011 Census to 1,562.

There are many caves in the area, the most famous of them being Dan-yr-Ogof, one of the largest cave systems in western Europe and a popular attraction for visitors.

A part of Tawe-Uchaf lies within Fforest Fawr Geopark and the Brecon Beacons National Park.

A complex of Bronze Age monuments known as Cerrig Duon (the "black rocks") – consisting of a stone circle, avenue, and three-stone row – and Maen Mawr (the "great stone") can be seen near the source of the Tawe at the northern end of the community area.

Tawe-Uchaf is also home to Craig-y-Nos Castle, a country house built in 1841 and subsequently purchased and much extended by the renowned operatic singer Adelina Patti.

Opencast coal mining is an important activity in the area.

== Governance ==
The Tawe Uchaf Community Council has thirteen community councillors representing three community wards: Ynyswen Penycae, Caehopkin and Coelbren. The council represents the community on planning issues and other matters.

An electoral ward in the same name exists, sending a county councillor to sit on Powys County Council. This ward includes Ystradfellte and at the 2011 Census had a population of 2,118.
