= Vale of Grwyney =

The Vale of Grwyney
- Population: 738
- OS grid reference: SO 238 190
  - Cardiff: 30.0 mi (48.3 km)
  - London: 130.6 mi (210.2 km)
- Community: The Vale of Grwyney
- Principal area: Powys
- Country: Wales
- Sovereign state: United Kingdom
- Post town: Crickhowell
- Police: Dyfed-Powys
- Fire: Mid and West Wales
- Ambulance: Welsh
- Website: valeofgrwyney.org
- List of places UK Wales Powys 51.9121°N 3.10685°W Map of the community

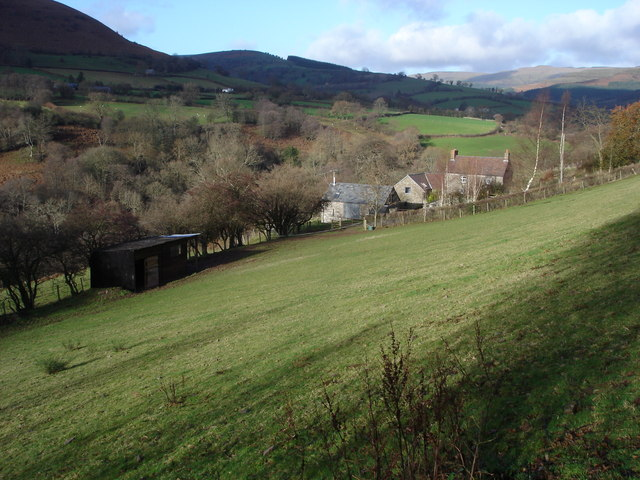
Llwynon, Vale of Grwyney

The Vale of Grwyney is a community in Powys, Wales. It follows most of the border between Powys and Monmouthshire. It takes its name from the river Grwyney (in Welsh, Grwyne) which flows through it into the River Usk. The river Grwyney has two tributaries, called the Grwyne Fechan and the Grywne Fawr, which both rise in the Black Mountains and converge into one river near Llanbedr before meeting the Usk at Glangrwyney.

The community includes the villages of Glangrwyney, Llangenny, and Llanbedr. In 2011 the population of The Vale of Grwyney was 738 with 9.4% of them able to speak Welsh. The community is part of the Crickhowell electoral ward and sends a county councillor to sit on Powys County Council.

30 miles (48 km) from Cardiff and 130 miles (210 km) from London.

== See also ==
- List of localities in Wales by population
