= River Honddu (Powys) =

River in Powys, Wales

Coordinates: 51°57′15″N 3°23′06″W

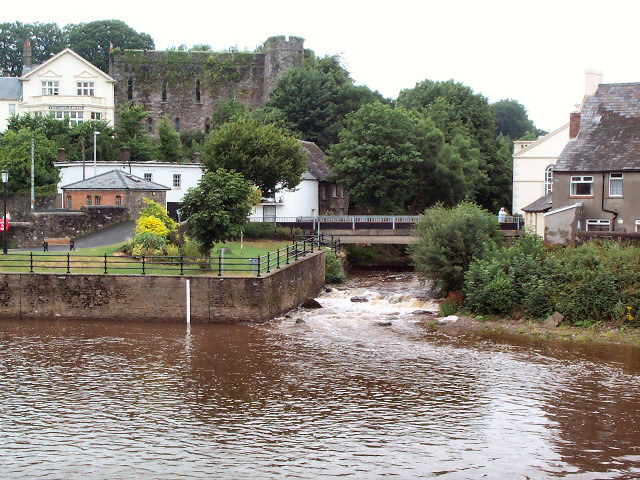
Aberhonddu, where the Honddu flows into the Usk at Brecon. Brecon Castle is on the left

The River Honddu (pronounced [hɔnðɪ] i.e. hon-thee) is a river in the county of Powys, mid Wales. Early recorded versions of the name are of the form Hothenei and hodni which are believed to contain the Welsh adjective 'hawdd', meaning 'pleasant' or 'easy', together with a suffix -ni. Later forms such as Honddey and Honthy have undergone metathesis whereby -ddn- became -ndd- (or -thn- to -nth- in anglicised form).

It rises on Mynydd Epynt and flows southwards to join the River Usk at Brecon, which takes its Welsh name (Aberhonddu) from the river. The river has no major tributaries but acquires numerous streams during its 11-mile course. The valley of the Honddu is followed by the B4520 road which runs north from Brecon to Builth Wells. The road serves the hamlets of Upper Chapel, Lower Chapel, Pwllgloyw and Llandefaelog each of which, Pwllgloyw apart, sit at bridging points of the Honddu.

Brecon Castle, now a hotel, sits at the lowermost crossing of the river at its confluence with the Usk. For the last 1.5 miles (2.4 km) of its course, it lies partly or wholly within Brecon Beacons National Park and Fforest Fawr Geopark.
