= Glyn Tarell =

- Location within Powys
- Population: 633
- OS grid reference: SN 979 232
  - Cardiff: 31.8 mi (51.2 km)
  - London: 146.1 mi (235.1 km)
- Community: Glyn Tarell
- Principal area: Powys
- Country: Wales
- Sovereign state: United Kingdom
- Post town: Aberhonddu
- Police: Dyfed-Powys
- Fire: Mid and West Wales
- Ambulance: Welsh
- List of places UK Wales Powys 51.898°N 3.485°W Community map: Map of the community

Glyn Tarell is a valley and a community in the county of Powys, Wales, and the historic county of Brecknockshire. It is in the Brecon Beacons National Park and at the northern edge of the Brecon Beacons mountains.

It includes the villages of Llanspyddid and Libanus.

== Description ==
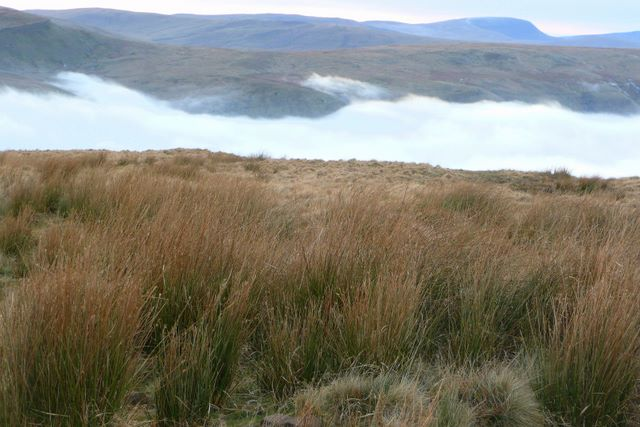

The valley is on the A470 road which runs along the eponymous valley of the River Tarell.

The Taff Trail runs through the valley. The administrative area of the community extends over a wide area of sparsely populated land, and extends south beyond the watershed to include the highest part of the River Taff and the Beacons Reservoir. Much of its northern boundary is formed by the River Usk. The peak Pen y Fan (886 m) is at the eastern boundary of the community. The main villages in the community are Libanus and Llanspyddid.

In 2011 the population of Glyn Tarell was 633, with 14.7% of them able to speak Welsh.

== Governance ==
Glyn Tarell has a community council of up to nine elected or co-opted community councillors.

The community is included in the Talybont-on-Usk electoral ward, which chooses one county councillor for Powys County Council.

== See also ==
- List of localities in Wales by population
