= Brecon Castle =

Ruined castle in Brecon, Powys, Wales

- Castell Aberhonddu (Welsh)
- near Brecon, Powys, Wales
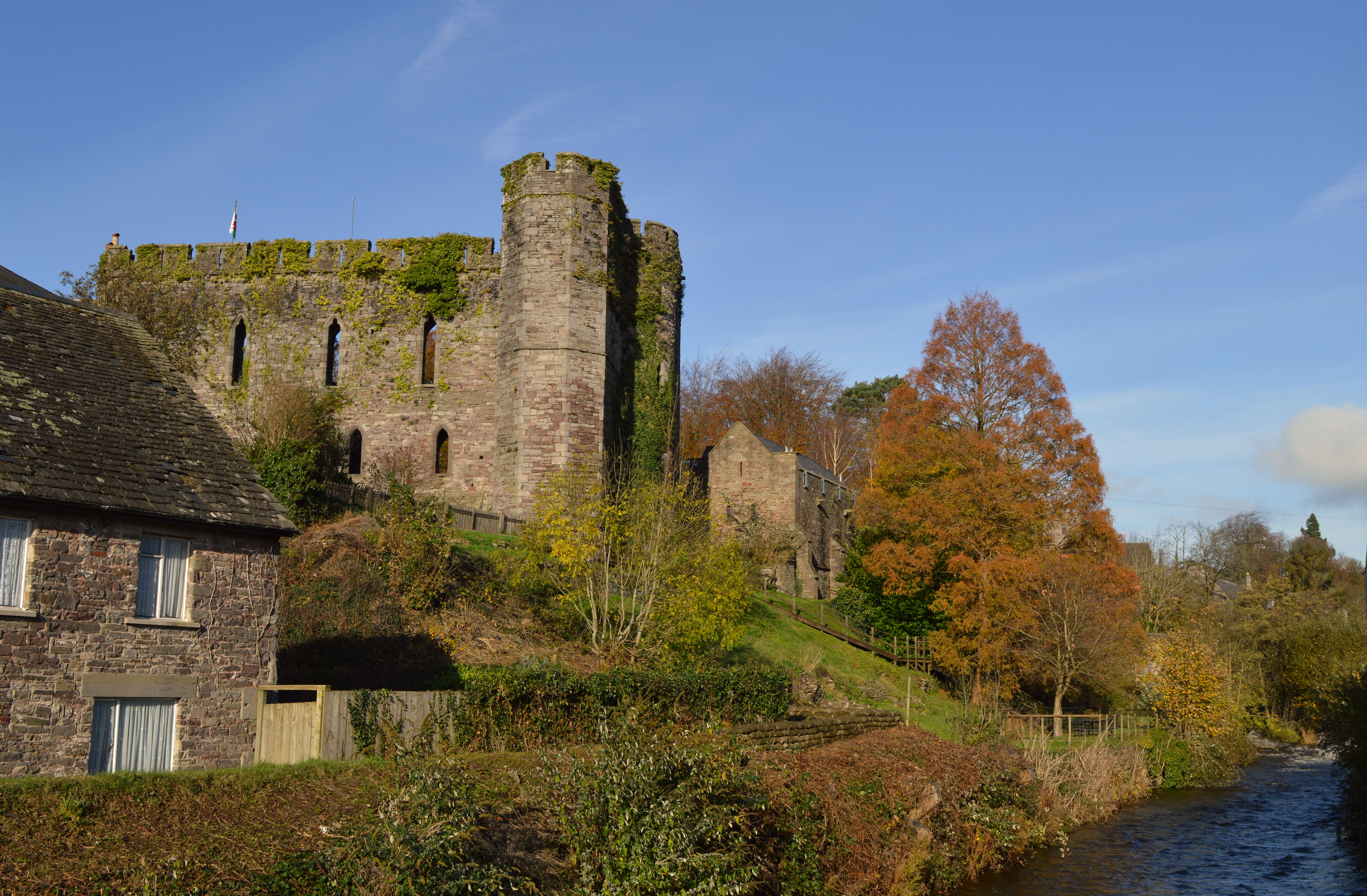
- Brecon Castle

Site information
- Type: Castle

Location
- Coordinates: 51.9491°N 3.3938°W

Site history
- Built: c. 1093
- Materials: Wood and stone

Listed Building – Grade I
- Official name: Remains of the Great Hall of Brecon Castle
- Designated: 16 January 1952
- Reference no.: 6851

Brecon Castle (Welsh: Castell Aberhonddu) is a castle in the town Brecon, Wales. It was built by the Norman Lord Bernard de Neufmarché in 1093, and was frequently assaulted by the Welsh in the 13th and 15th centuries. The castle's ownership changed numerous times. It began falling into ruin when Henry VIII executed the last dukes of Buckingham, who at the time controlled the castle. It was renovated and made into a hotel in the early 19th century. It is a Grade I listed building.

== History ==
Bernard de Neufmarché, sometimes claimed to be William the Conqueror's brother, conquered Brycheiniog after killing Rhys ap Tewdwr at the battle of Brecon, which occurred around Easter 1093. The Normans subsequently invaded all of South Wales, defeating the local rulers. Bernard received the title of Lord of Brecon. He commenced the construction of the motte-and-bailey castle at Brecon in 1093, thereby creating the first stone castle in Wales. The stones were taken from the Roman town of Caer Badden. The castle was built at the merging point of the rivers Usk and Honddu, conferring the benefits of protection and hydropower for mills.

The castle later passed to the de Braose family. When the de Braoses rebelled against King John of England, John captured the castle in 1207. However, the de Braose family retook the castle during the First Barons' War. The Bohun family received the castle in 1241 and held it until 1373 when Humphrey de Bohun, 7th Earl of Hereford died without male issue. It eventually passed to the Stafford family, of whom Edmund Stafford, 5th Earl of Stafford (1377-1403), of Stafford Castle, had married Anne of Gloucester (1383-1438), daughter and heiress of Thomas of Woodstock, 1st Duke of Gloucester (youngest son of King Edward III) by his wife Eleanor de Bohun, the elder daughter and co-heiress of Humphrey de Bohun, 7th Earl of Hereford. Edward Stafford, 3rd Duke of Buckingham (1477–1521), born in Brecon Castle, was executed for treason in 1521 and posthumously attainted in 1523, when all the family's estates escheated to the crown. Although some estates were later recovered by his descendants, Brecon Castle began the process of dilapidation. The castle was last besieged by Rowland Laugharne, a military commander for the Parliament, in 1645. The Welsh also attacked the castle numerous times, in 1215, 1231, 1233, 1264, 1265, 1273, and 1403. It was first captured by the Welsh in 1215, and it was captured again in 1264 and 1265. The attacks of 1273 and 1403 resulted in serious damage.

Numerous renovations were carried out through the castle's history. A shell keep made of stone was constructed in the late 12th century (the keep was initially made of wood). In 1233, a bailey wall, also made of stone, was constructed. Two towers, one round and the other semi-octagonal, were built in the 13th century and early 14th century, respectively. A hall block was added in 1300.

The castle had become mere ruins by the end of the Georgian era. Renovations were begun in 1809 by Sir Charles Morgan of Tredegar House, and more than £7,000 had been spent on the repairs by 1814. The castle was made a hotel, which it currently continues to be.
