= Merthyr Cynog =

- Hamlet and community
- Location within Powys
- Principal area: Powys
- Country: Wales
- Sovereign state: United Kingdom
- Police: Dyfed-Powys
- Fire: Mid and West Wales
- Ambulance: Welsh
- List of places UK Wales Powys 52°01′N 3°29′W Community map: Map of the community

Merthyr Cynog is a hamlet and a community in the modern county of Powys, Wales, in the historic county of Brecknockshire. The population of the community at the 2021 Census was 245.

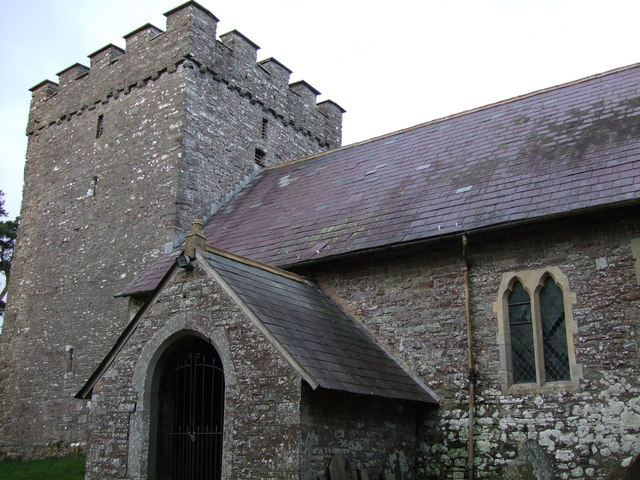
Church of St Cynog

The Welsh name signifies the 'shrine of Cynog'. The grade II* listed church, a place of pilgrimage, is dedicated to Saint Cynog, a son of Brychan Brycheiniog, and was founded in the 5th century. It is situated on the land between the valleys of the Ysgir Fawr and the Ysgir Fach which penetrate northwestwards into the uplands of Mynydd Epynt from the River Usk some miles to the south. The community includes the hamlet of Upper Chapel which lies a couple of miles to the northeast. To the north and west of Merthyr Cynog is the Army's extensive Sennybridge Training Area or 'SENTA'.

In 2013 Merthyr Cynog Community launched a new website.

For elections to Powys County Council, Merthyr Cynog is part of the Yscir electoral ward.

== Notable people ==
- Mary Elizabeth Phillips, physician, is buried here
