= Aberyscir =

Coordinates: 51.9584°N 3.4576°W

Aberyscir: Welsh: Aberysgir
- Location within Powys
- OS grid reference: SN 999 299
  - Cardiff: 35 mi (56 km)
  - London: 146 mi (235 km)
- Community: Yscir
- Principal area: Powys
- Country: Wales
- Sovereign state: United Kingdom
- Post town: BRECON
- Postcode district: LD3
- Police: Dyfed-Powys
- Fire: Mid and West Wales
- Ambulance: Welsh
- UK Parliament: Brecon, Radnor and Cwm Tawe
- Senedd Cymru – Welsh Parliament: Brecon and Radnorshire

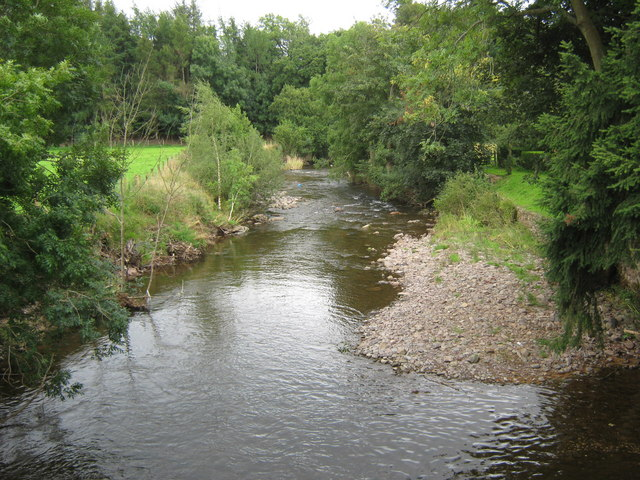

Aberyscir (Welsh: Aberysgir) is a village in the community of Yscir, Powys, Wales, which is 4 miles (6 km) west of Brecon, 35 miles (56 km) from Cardiff and 146 miles (235 km) from London.

== See also ==
- List of localities in Wales by population
