= Llywel =

Village and community in Powys, Wales

- Village and community
- Location within Powys
- Principal area: Powys
- Country: Wales
- Sovereign state: United Kingdom
- Police: Dyfed-Powys
- Fire: Mid and West Wales
- Ambulance: Welsh
- List of places UK Wales Powys 51.95748°N 3.646572°W Community map: Map of the community

Llywel (Welsh pronunciation) is a small village and community located on the A40, about 4 miles (6.4 km) west of Sennybridge in Powys, Wales. The Afon Gwydderig runs through the village, not far from its source. The main settlement in the community is Trecastle. According to the 2001 Census the population of the Llywel community is 524, falling to 497 in the 2011 Census. The village was historically in Brecknockshire.

== Etymology ==
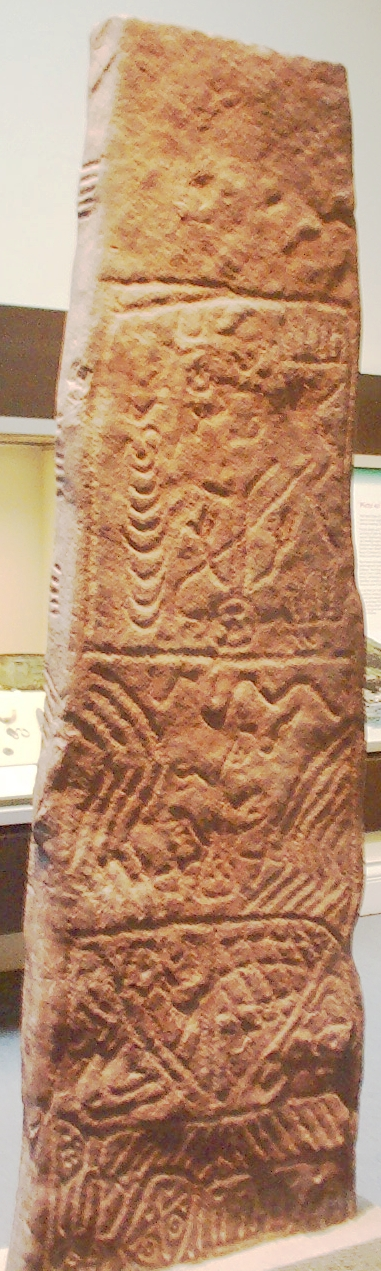
Llywel Stone on display in the British Museum

Llywel, occasionally referred to in texts as Llowel, is believed to be the name of a minor Welsh Saint. He is said to have been a disciple of Saint Teilo and Saint Dyfrig.

== Church of St David ==
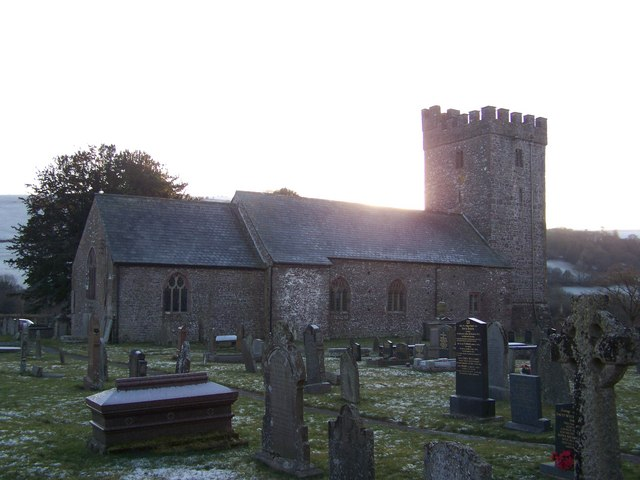
St David's Church

The Church of Saint David (Welsh: Eglwys Dewi Sant) in Llywel is said to have been dedicated to three saints: David, Padarn (Paternus), and Teilo; and known as Llantrisant. Its name was changed when it was granted to the Chapter of Saint David sometime between 1203 and 1229 It is a Grade I listed building.

The church displays Perpendicular Gothic architecture. The grave of the writer and preacher David Owen (Brutus) is in the churchyard. As well as holding a copy of the famous Llywel Stone, the Church holds the original Aberhydfer stone and old village stocks.

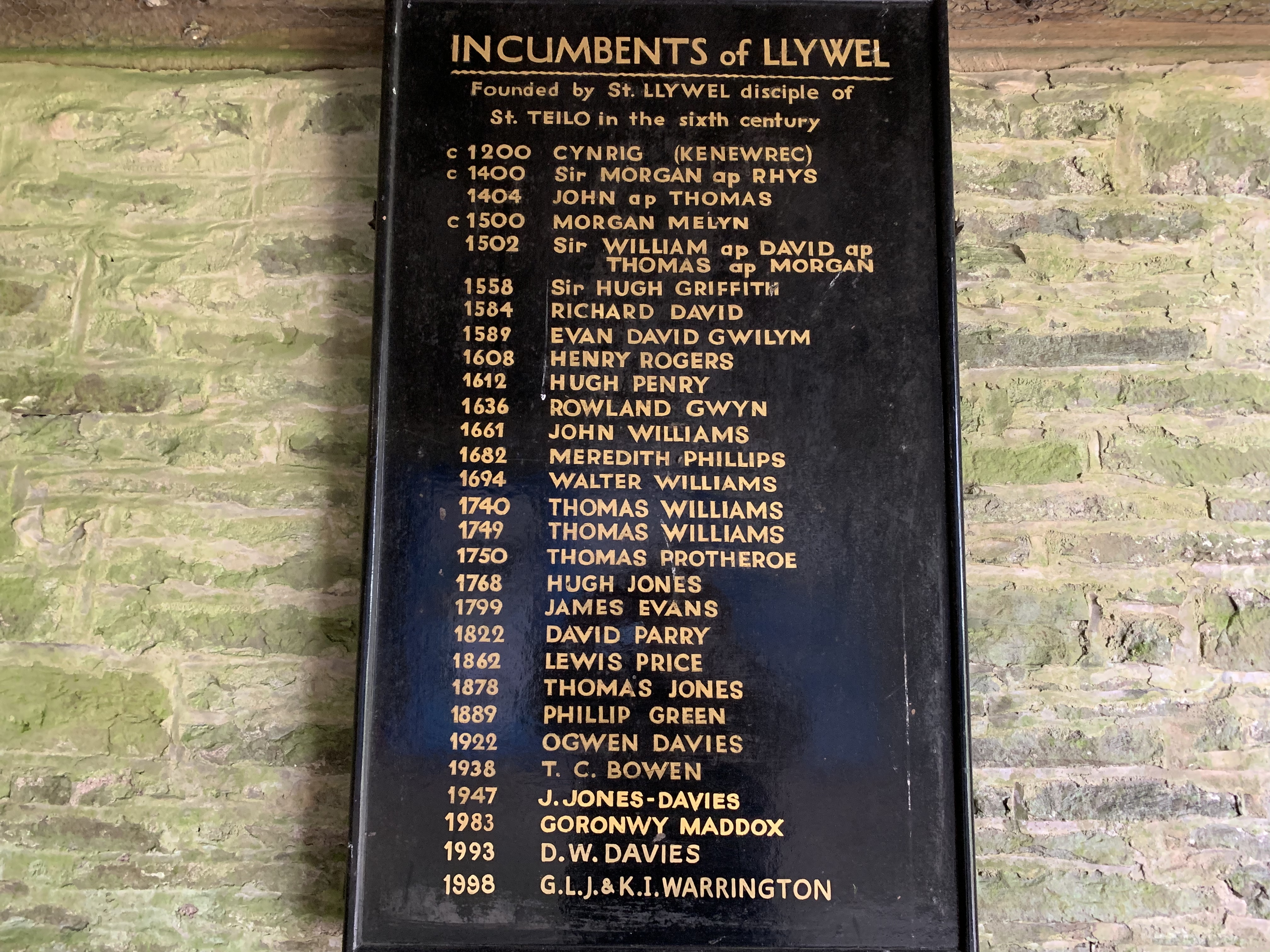
List of vicars of St David's Church, Llywel

== Llywel Stone ==
An Ogham stone named the Llywel Stone—because it was brought to the attention of the British Museum by the local vicar—, Lewis Price, was found at Pentre Poeth Farm. (Pentre Poeth farm no longer exists. It was in the region close to Cwm-cynwal and Pant y cadno just off the road from Bwysfa fawr near Trecastle on the way to Belfont farm Crai. There now is a large water tank on the place where the farm stood, which now is on Tircapel (Ty'r capel) farm ground. Tirchapel farm is believed to be named after an ancient chapel, Capel Illud, and it may be that the Llywel stone originally stood at the chapel site. The site is along the Roman road from Caerleon to Carmarthen, the Via Julia Montana). In 1878, the Llywel stone was acquired by the British Museum and it is on display there. The inscription on the stone is 'MACCVTRENI + SALICIDVNI'. A National Park booklet provides a drawing of the Llywel Stone and states that copies reside with Llywel Church and the Y Gaer cultural hub in Brecon.

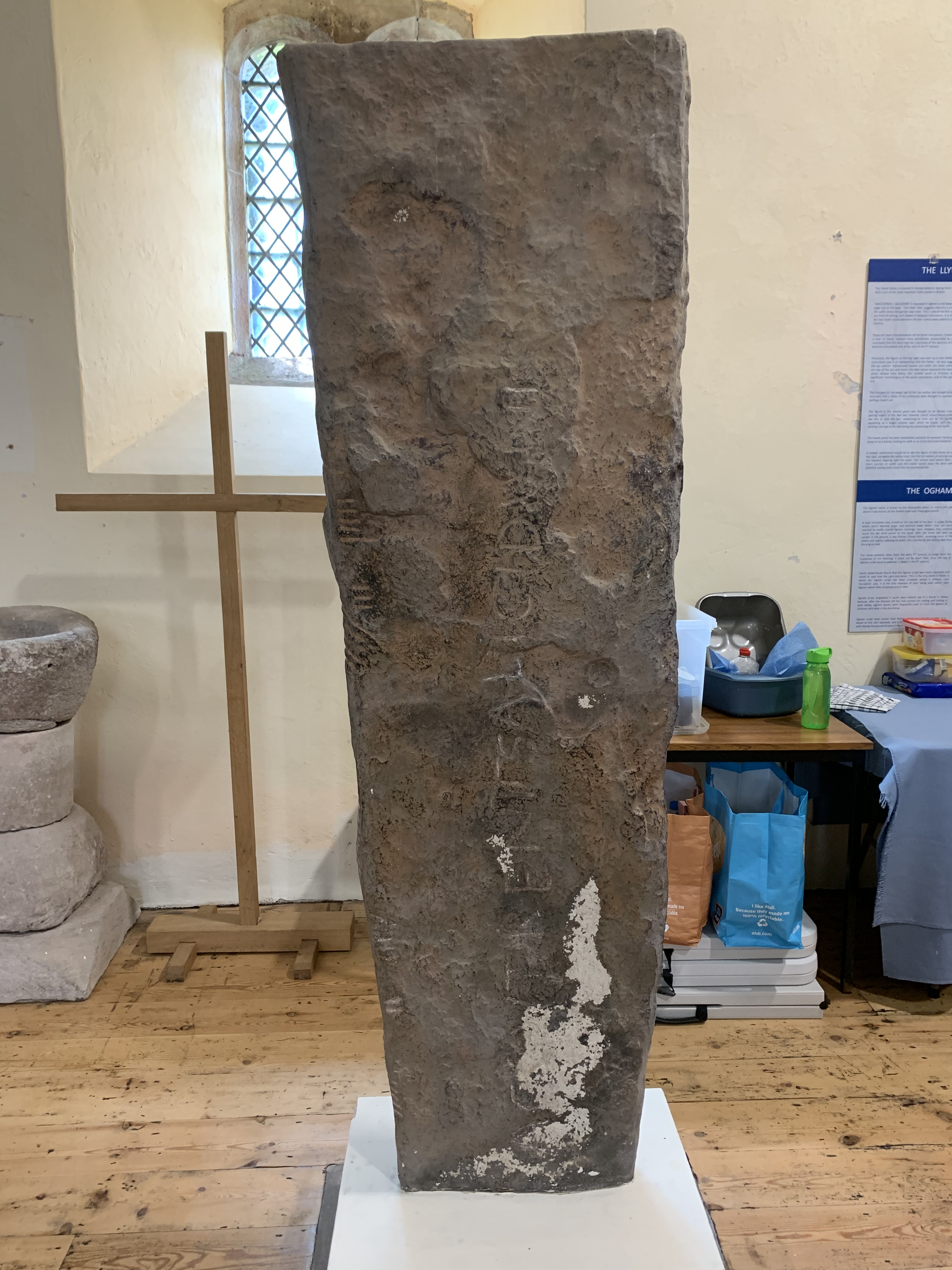
Replica of the Llywel Stone, stored in St David's Church, Llywel. Another copy is held in the Brecon Museum and the original is held in the British Museum, London.

== Localities ==
- Bishops Town
