= Pwllgloyw =

Coordinates: 51.993°N 3.412°W

- Location within Powys
- Civil parish: Dan yr Epynt
- Principal area: Powys
- Country: Wales
- Sovereign state: United Kingdom
- Post town: BRECON
- Postcode district: LD3
- Dialling code: 01874
- Police: Dyfed-Powys
- Fire: Mid and West Wales
- Ambulance: Welsh
- UK Parliament: Brecon, Radnor and Cwm Tawe
- Senedd Cymru – Welsh Parliament: Brecon and Radnorshire

Pwllgloyw is a settlement on the edge of the Brecon Beacons in the county of Powys in south-east Wales in the community of Honddu Isaf.

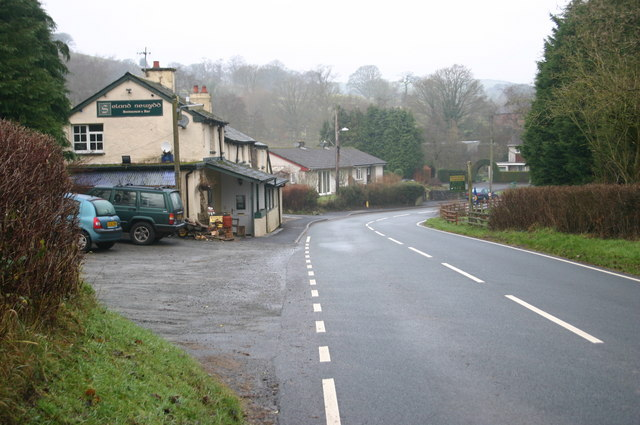

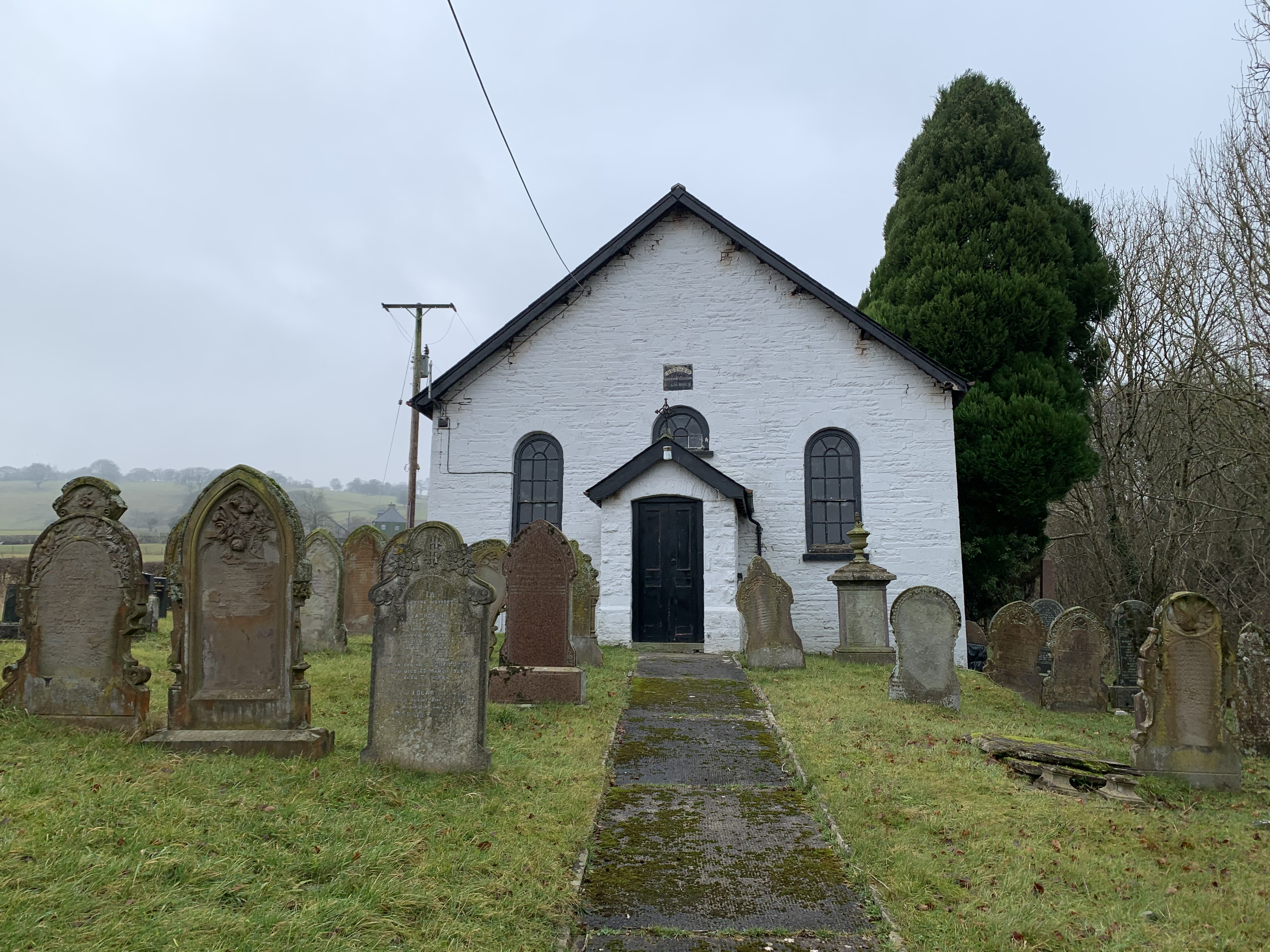
Bethel Chapel, Pwllgloyw, near Lower Chapel, Breconshire

== Communications ==
In April 2014, Pwllgloyw was named in a TV commercial by the online gaming company, Jackpot247 as one of the worst places in the UK for mobile internet reception. According to Ofcom, Powys has the poorest 3G reception in Wales and the area around Pwllgloyw falls in the worst 6% of the UK for 3G coverage by all network operators.
