= Grade II* listed buildings in Powys =

Powys shown within Wales

In the United Kingdom, the term listed building refers to a building or other structure officially designated as being of special architectural, historical, or cultural significance; Grade II* structures are those considered to be "particularly important buildings of more than special interest". Listing was begun by a provision in the Town and Country Planning Act 1947. Once listed, strict limitations are imposed on the modifications allowed to a building's structure or fittings. In Wales, the authority for listing under the Planning (Listed Buildings and Conservation Areas) Act 1990 rests with Cadw.

== Buildings ==
Note: for technical reasons, the grid references in the following table are only displayed as text, not as links as in other articles in this series.

Name	Location Grid Ref. (Note: Sometimes known as OSGB36, the grid reference is based on the British national grid reference system used by the Ordnance Survey.) Geo-coordinates	Date Listed	Function	Notes	Reference Number	Image
Henfache	Llanrhaeadr ym Mochnant (N); SJ1238327031; 52°50′01″N 3°18′07″W	20 October 1952	House	To the north of the farmyard of Henfache, about 1 km north of the village of Llanrhaeadr-ym-Mochnant.	606	Henfache
Henblas	Llangedwyn; SJ1702623809; 52°48′20″N 3°13′56″W	20 October 1952	House	Just south of the River Tanat, about 1 km west of Pont Llangedwyn.	607	Upload Photo
Lloran Ucha	Llansilin; SJ1616527140; 52°50′07″N 3°14′45″W	20 October 1952	House		608	Upload Photo
Glascoed	Llansilin; SJ2177927625; 52°50′26″N 3°09′46″W	20 October 1952	House	At east of farmyard, about 1 km southeast of the village of Llansilin.	610	Upload Photo
Hafod	Llansilin; SJ2049632163; 52°52′52″N 3°10′58″W	20 October 1952	House	Reached by a short lane to the north of the Rhiwlas to Rhydycroesau road.	611	Upload Photo
Plas-uchaf, Llangedwyn	Llangedwyn; SJ1765724533; 52°48′43″N 3°13′23″W	1 April 1966	House	In private grounds to the north of the B4396 about 1 km west of Llangedwyn Hall.	635	Plas-uchaf, Llangedwyn
Church of St Dogfan, Llanrhaeadr-ym-Mochnant	Llanrhaeadr ym Mochnant; SJ1239326025; 52°49′29″N 3°18′06″W	1 April 1966	Church	In the village of Llanrhaeadr-ym-Mochnant, in a large churchyard now principally entered by a C20 lychgate at north; stone churchyard wall and railings. Gates at west and south.	636	See more images
Ty-newydd, Llansilin	Llansilin; SJ2084727037; 52°50′06″N 3°10′35″W	1 April 1966	House	To the east of farm buildings, 1 km south of the village of Llansilin.	641	Ty-newydd, Llansilin
Tyddyn Cynar	Llansilin; SJ2122230441; 52°51′56″N 3°10′18″W	1 April 1966	House	Reached by a track to the south of the minor road from Llangadwaladr to Rhydycroesau.	642	Upload Photo
Pen-y-bryn, Llansilin	Llansilin; SJ2013727063; 52°50′07″N 3°11′13″W	1 April 1966	House	To the west of farm buildings, 1 km south-west of the village of Llansilin.	655	Pen-y-bryn, Llansilin
Circular cow-house at Gwaunclawdd	Ystradgynlais; SN8102412253; 51°47′47″N 3°43′36″W	17 January 1963	Cow-house	About 1 km west of Abercraf and south of A 4067 and River Tawe. Towards end of group of buildings on the east side of lane.	6610	Upload Photo
Ty Mawr, Llanigon	Llanigon; SO2148139958; 52°03′09″N 3°08′47″W	19 November 1963	House		6612	Upload Photo
Middle Maestorglwydd Barn	Llanigon; SO2140037420; 52°01′47″N 3°08′50″W	19 November 1963	Barn		6613	Middle Maestorglwydd Barn
Bronllys Castle House	Bronllys; SO1490634703; 52°00′15″N 3°14′28″W	28 September 1961	House	Located within the inner bailey of Bronllys Castle, north-northwest of the motte.	6615	Bronllys Castle House
Workshop and gallery at Bronllys Castle House	Bronllys; SO1488034709; 52°00′15″N 3°14′29″W	28 September 1961	Workshop	Located to the southwest of Bronllys Castle House, backing on to the turn of the former inner bailey of the castle, and forming the west side of the front lawns of the house.	6617	Upload Photo
Penyrwrlodd Farmhouse	Llanigon; SO2200939816; 52°03′04″N 3°08′20″W	28 September 1961	Farmhouse		6625	Upload Photo
Tynllyne Farmhouse, Heol-y-Gaer	Llanigon; SO2006439471; 52°02′52″N 3°10′01″W	28 September 1961	Farmhouse		6628	Upload Photo
Middle Maestorglwydd House	Llanigon; SO2125137209; 52°01′40″N 3°08′57″W	28 September 1961	House		6630	Upload Photo
Church of St Gwendoline, Talgarth	Talgarth; SO1572833817; 51°59′47″N 3°13′44″W	28 September 1961	Church	Situated on a small rise above the village, at the junction of Church St. with School St.	6636	See more images
Coleg Trefeca	Talgarth; SO1439832142; 51°58′52″N 3°14′52″W	28 September 1961	College	Former theological college, established 1768.	6637	See more images
Broomfield, Gwernyfed	Gwernyfed; SO1841739473; 52°02′52″N 3°11′28″W	28 September 1961	House	Located on a terrace cut out of the steep bank of the Wye valley, high above the main Brecon to Hay road, and backing directly on to the former Hereford, Hay and Brecon Railway.	6643	Upload Photo
Garden gatepiers to a cross terrace in the formal west gardens at Old Gwernyfed	Gwernyfed; SO1818436572; 52°01′18″N 3°11′37″W	28 September 1961	Gatepiers	Located approximately 60 m west of the wouthwest wing of the west elevation of Old Gwernyfed house, on a cross terrace of the garden earthworks, laid out south-southwest to north-northwest, tangentially to and overlooked by the house.	6645	Upload Photo
North Tower in inner front garden, with the garden boundary wall leading to the northeastern wing of Old Gwernyfed.	Gwernyfed; SO1828936547; 52°01′17″N 3°11′32″W	28 September 1961	Tower	Located at the northeast corner of the inner courtyard in front of Old Gwernyfed, and attached at the rear to the range of farm buildings previously belonging to Old Gwernyfed. Formerly (pre-1800) set in a garden curtain wall.	6646	Upload Photo
Y Dderw	Bronllys; SO1400237657; 52°01′50″N 3°15′18″W	28 February 1952	Farmhouse	Located at the head of the driveway off the main Llyswen to Hay road, on level ground in the floodplain of the River Wye.	6650	See more images
Trefeca College Farmhouse	Talgarth; SO1445132512; 51°59′04″N 3°14′50″W	28 February 1952	Farmhouse		6651	See more images
Great Porthamel Farm	Talgarth; SO1593035200; 52°00′32″N 3°13′35″W	28 February 1952	Farmhouse		6652	See more images
Church of St Peter, The Vale of Grwyney	Llanbedr, The Vale of Grwyney; SO2397020420; 51°52′38″N 3°06′21″W	19 July 1963	Church	In the centre of Llanbedr village and within a walled churchyard.	6658	See more images
Church of St Michael, Llanfihangel Cwmdu with Bwlch and Cathedine	Llanfihangel Cwmdu with Bwlch and Cathedine; SO1804923844; 51°54′26″N 3°11′34″W	19 July 1963	Church	Prominently sited at the northern end of Cwmdu village, on eastern side of A479, and surrounded by churchyard.	6668	See more images
Church of St Cattwg, Llangattock	Llangattock; SO2109117878; 51°51′14″N 3°08′50″W	19 July 1963	Church	Located at the northern end of the village, 0.6 km from Crickhowell Bridge. In an oval churchyard with a lych gate to the southwest.	6675	See more images
Cwrt Llangattock	Llangattock; SO2097217970; 51°51′17″N 3°08′56″W	19 July 1963	House	Situated on the northwest edge of Llangattock village, 150 m from the church, and on the western side of the lane leading to Dardy.	6676	Upload Photo
Plas Llangattwg	Llangattock; SO2119917837; 51°51′13″N 3°08′44″W	19 July 1963	House	Located at the northern end of the village, 150 m from the church. The house is situated within oval-shaped gardens, the road curving round them to the southeast. Ornate cast iron gates on the roadside lead to a circular driveway in front of the house.	6677	Upload Photo
Church of St Cenau, Llangenny	Llangenny, The Vale of Grwyney; SO2401218148; 51°51′24″N 3°06′17″W	19 July 1963	Church	On the eastern side of a minor road through Llangenny, and western side of Afon Grwyne, in a walled churchyard.	6680	See more images
Penlan	The Vale of Grwyney; SO2515919840; 51°52′20″N 3°05′18″W	19 July 1963	House	Isolated house on high ground approximately 1.3 km southeast of the Llanbedr church, reached by private road south of minor road between Llangenny and Partrishow at Dyffryn farm.	6683	Upload Photo
Churchyard cross at Church of St Issui, Partrishow	Patrishow, The Vale of Grwyney; SO2789122428; 51°53′45″N 3°02′58″W	19 July 1963	Churchyard Cross	At the southern side of church.	6688	Churchyard cross at Church of St Issui, Partrishow
Tynyllwyn	The Vale of Grwyney; SO2806522358; 51°53′42″N 3°02′48″W	19 July 1963	House	Approximately 200 m southeast of Partrishow church; reached by footpaths from church and on western side of a minor road to Grwyne Fawr reservoir.	6690	See more images
Neuadd	The Vale of Grwyney; SO2805921025; 51°52′59″N 3°02′48″W	19 July 1963	House	Approximately 0.9 km south of Partrishow church, on northern side and set back above a minor road between Partrishow and Llanbedr.	6691	Upload Photo
Moor Park, The Vale of Grwyney	The Vale of Grwyney; SO2370119850; 51°52′19″N 3°06′35″W	1 April 1952	House	Set in parkland approximately 0.6 km south-southwest of the Llanbedr church, accessible via a private drive west of a minor road connecting Llanbedr to Llangenny.	6693	Upload Photo
Cefn Brith, Llangamarch	Llangamarch; SN9164145367; 52°05′46″N 3°35′00″W	19 September 1952	House	Starting from a junction west of Llangammarch, Cefn Brith is situated on the eastern side of the road to Tirabad, about 2 km away.	6697	See more images
Church of St Mary, Crickadarn	Crickadarn, Erwood; SO0896342228; 52°04′15″N 3°19′47″W	23 March 1962	Church	Situated in the centre of Crickadarn village, on the western side of village square, in circular raised churchyard.	6707	See more images
The Neuadd, Erwood	Erwood; SO0815642369; 52°04′19″N 3°20′29″W	23 March 1962	House	Situated on hillside reached up drive running west off-road to Gwenddwr some 500 m west of Crickadarn.	6708	Upload Photo
Aberduhonw	Duhonw; SO0630350746; 52°08′49″N 3°22′15″W	23 March 1962	House	Situated on the northeastern side of the A470 some 1.5 km east of the Builth Wells.	6710	Upload Photo
Barn and attached ranges at Aberduhonw	Duhonw; SO0634050722; 52°08′49″N 3°22′13″W	23 March 1962	Barn	Situated east of the house at Aberduhonw, on the A470 some 1.5 km east of the Builth Wells.	6711	Upload Photo
Llannerch-y-Cawr	Llanwrthwl; SN9020761451; 52°14′25″N 3°36′34″W	23 March 1962	House	To the southwest of Dolymynach reservoir and reached by farm road south of the unclassified road to the Claerwen reservoir.	6715	Upload Photo
Church of St Tetta, Talybont on Usk	Llanddetty, Talybont-on-Usk; SO1280820231; 51°52′26″N 3°16′05″W	17 January 1963	Church	In the scattered hamlet of Llanddetty, east of the canal and the valley road and close to the southern bank of the River Usk; reached by a path down through the sloping churchyard from the lychgate by road.	6727	See more images
Maes Mawr, Talybont on Usk	Talybont on Usk; SO1180622543; 51°53′40″N 3°16′59″W	17 January 1963	House	On low lying ground east of the Caerfanell river and on the eastern edge of the village of Talybont, reached off the B4558.	6729	Upload Photo
Aberllech	Maescar; SN9111632816; 51°58′59″N 3°35′13″W	17 January 1963	House	Situated some 300 m southeast of Pentrebach on the eastern side of road to Sennybridge.	6732	Upload Photo
Llandefaelog-tre'r-graig	Felin Fach; SO1264829986; 51°57′41″N 3°16′22″W	17 January 1963	House	On the northern side of Llandefaelog-tre'r-graig some 1.7 km south of Tredomen.	6748	Upload Photo
Abercynrig	Llanfrynach; SO0693127062; 51°56′03″N 3°21′18″W	17 January 1963	House	Situated 1.4 km northwest of Llanfrynach, Abercynrig is accessible by taking a minor road west from Llanfrynach and turning north onto a long drive.	6753	Upload Photo
Church of St Gastyn, Llangasty Tal-y-llyn	Llangasty, Llangors; SO1331026133; 51°55′37″N 3°15′44″W	17 January 1963	Church	Very near the southern edge of Llangorse Lake and adjacent to the Old School.	6755	See more images
Old School House, Llangasty Tal-y-llyn	Llangasty, Llangors; SO1329426081; 51°55′35″N 3°15′44″W	17 January 1963	House	Near Llangorse lake and adjacent to the church of St Gastyn.	6756	Old School House, Llangasty Tal-y-llyn
Brynllici	Llangors; SO1102826353; 51°55′43″N 3°17′43″W	17 January 1963	House	Situated down a farm track just northwest of the hamlet of Pennorth.	6759	Upload Photo
Trebinshwn house and attached stable wing	Llangors; SO1364924125; 51°54′32″N 3°15′24″W	17 January 1963	House	Southeast of Llangorse lake, set in grounds reached by a drive.	6760	Upload Photo
Church of St Paulinus, Llangors	Llangors; SO1349927626; 51°56′25″N 3°15′35″W	17 January 1963	Church	Situated in the centre of Llangors Village on low lying ground in a rectangular churchyard bordered to the north by Nant Cwy.	6761	See more images
Peterstone Court	Lanhamlach; SO0880226569; 51°55′49″N 3°19′40″W	17 January 1963	Hotel	Situated down short lane running south off A40, just west of the Church of Saint Peter and Saint Illtyd in Llanhamlach.	6762	Peterstone Court
Cefn Brynich Canal Bridge Aqueduct	Llanfrynach; SO0791327297; 51°56′12″N 3°20′27″W	17 January 1963	Aqueduct	Situated crossing the Usk some 180 m downstream of the Lock Bridge on the road to Llanfrynach.	6763	See more images
Lock Road Bridge	Llanfrynach; SO0773627280; 51°56′11″N 3°20′36″W	17 January 1963	Bridge	Situated some 200 m south of the A40, carrying the road to Llanfrynach across the river Usk.	6764	See more images
Scethrog House	Talybont on Usk; SO1067725142; 51°55′03″N 3°18′01″W	17 January 1963	House	In the hamlet of Scethrog, on sloping ground above the River Usk and north of the A40.	6767	Upload Photo
Church of St Mary, Llangors	Llanywern, Llangors; SO1018828663; 51°56′57″N 3°18′29″W	17 January 1963	Church	In the centre of the small hamlet of Llanywern, on flat low land bordered by a stream to the north.	6770	See more images
Church of Saint Cynog, Merthyr Cynog	Merthyr Cynog; SN9848437443; 52°01′34″N 3°28′52″W	17 January 1963	Church	In a prominent position in the centre of Merthyr Cynog village.	6777	See more images
The lodge at Penpont Manor	Trallong; SN9724928585; 51°56′47″N 3°29′47″W	17 January 1963	Lodge	Situated facing northeast set back from drive to Penpont, about 200 m southeast of the mansion.	6780	Upload Photo
The Stables, Trallong	Trallong; SN9711528762; 51°56′52″N 3°29′54″W	17 January 1963	Stables	Situated on the western side of rear court at Penpont.	6781	Upload Photo
The Old Granary and the Old Laundry	Trallong; SN9712728782; 51°56′53″N 3°29′53″W	17 January 1963	Granary and Laundry	Situated facing south down the rear courtyard at Penpont.	6782	Upload Photo
Dovecote at Penpont	Trallong; SN9703928798; 51°56′53″N 3°29′58″W	17 January 1963	Dovecote	Situated in field behind the hay-barn at Penpont.	6784	Upload Photo
Abercamlais Bridge	Trallong; SN9652529064; 51°57′02″N 3°30′25″W	17 January 1963	BRIdge	Situated to the north of the yard at Abercamlais, across the Usk.	6786	Upload Photo
Pigeon house at Abercamlais	Trallong; SN9645029019; 51°57′00″N 3°30′29″W	17 January 1963	Pigeon House	Situated west of the house at Abercamlais on a bridge over the Camlais.	6787	Upload Photo
Aberbran Fawr	Trallong; SN9887928950; 51°56′59″N 3°28′22″W	17 January 1963	House	Some 250 m south of Aberbran Bridge over the River Usk.	6789	Upload Photo
Trebarried Hall	Felin Fach; SO1167735173; 52°00′29″N 3°17′17″W	25 September 1951	House	On the eastern side of the A470 approximately 1 km southeast of the Church of Saint Matthew at Llandefalle.	6798	Upload Photo
Block of buildings at Christ College to the southeast of the school chapel.	Brecon; SO0421928439; 51°56′46″N 3°23′42″W	16 January 1952	School	Within the extensive school grounds, about 200 m southwest of Usk Bridge.	6827	Block of buildings at Christ College to the southeast of the school chapel.
1 Buckingham Place	Brecon; SO0440828496; 51°56′48″N 3°23′32″W	16 January 1952	House	Forming the southwestern corner as Glamorgan Street turns north to become Wheat Street.	6828	1 Buckingham Place
Tower of Medieval Town Wall to rear of No.3 Buckingham Place	Brecon; SO0442028411; 51°56′46″N 3°23′31″W	16 December 1976	Town wall	Near the river, to the rear of No. 3 Buckingham Place, Glamorgan Street; best seen from the western end of Captain's Walk.	6829	Tower of Medieval Town Wall to rear of No.3 Buckingham Place
12 & 12a The Bulwark	Brecon; SO0457628476; 51°56′48″N 3°23′23″W	16 January 1952	Former houses	A three storey former townhouse, dating to the 17th century. Close to northwest end on the southern side of The Bulwark.	6842	Upload Photo
Brecon Castle Hotel	Brecon; SO0428528730; 51°56′56″N 3°23′39″W	16 January 1952	Hotel	Prominently sited above River Usk and next to remains of great hall of castle. Entrance front faces Castle Square and castle motte.	6852	See more images
Havard House, including Forecourt Wall, Railings and Gate; and Former Stable Blocks to East and West	Brecon; SO0446528460; 51°56′47″N 3°23′29″W	16 January 1952	House	Three-storey townhouse dating to the 17th century, with forecourt, railings, gate and former Stable Blocks to east and west. Between Buckingham Place and Morgannwg House.	6893	Upload Photo
5 Glamorgan Street	Brecon; SO0454128452; 51°56′47″N 3°23′25″W	16 January 1952	Houses	The first houses to the west of Brecknock Museum.	6897	Upload Photo
Priory Mill, Llanddew	Llanddew; SO0488429639; 51°57′26″N 3°23′08″W	16 December 1976	Mill	In the valley of the Afon Honddu below the Hay Road on the northeastern edge of Brecon just east of the river.	6901	Upload Photo
46 High Street Inferior	Brecon; SO0447228575; 51°56′51″N 3°23′29″W	16 January 1952	Shop	Set slightly forward from buildings to R.	6933	Upload Photo
Plough United Reformed Church	Brecon; SO0463828496; 51°56′48″N 3°23′20″W	16 December 1976	Chapel	Near the southern end of Lion Street, set back.	6945	See more images
No.4 Lion Street, including Forecourt Gate & Railings	Brecon; SO0460128537; 51°56′50″N 3°23′22″W	16 January 1952	House	Immediately to the northwest of police station.	6947	No.4 Lion Street, including Forecourt Gate & Railings
Cantre Selyf	Brecon; SO0457828555; 51°56′50″N 3°23′23″W	16 January 1952	House	To the southeast of junction with Lion Yard, facing lane which leads to St Mary's Church.	6949	Cantre Selyf
Church House, Brecon	Brecon; SO0451428623; 51°56′52″N 3°23′26″W	31 May 1961	House	About 30 m northwest of the entrance to Bethel Square.	6959	Upload Photo
Priory Walls at Brecon Cathedral, including North, West and Postern Gateways	Brecon; SO0436229028; 51°57′05″N 3°23′35″W	16 December 1976	Boundary Wall	Enclosing the Cathedral Close on three sides. The OS map reference is to the western gateway.	6999	Priory Walls at Brecon Cathedral, including North, West and Postern Gateways
Tithe barn, Brecon Cathedral	Brecon; SO0437928974; 51°57′04″N 3°23′34″W	16 January 1952	Barn/Museum	Backing on to Priory Hill, near archway to Cathedral Close	7001	See more images
Church of St Mary, Brecon	Brecon; SO0452528525; 51°56′49″N 3°23′26″W	16 January 1952	Church	Prominently sited at centre of old town.	7015	See more images
5 St Mary Street	Brecon; SO0445028541; 51°56′50″N 3°23′30″W	16 January 1952	House	Immediately to the south of St Mary's Church, at the corner with the lane to Glamorgan Street.	7019	Upload Photo
Boleyn House and Flats round Rear Courtyard and Stone Flagged Pavement	Brecon; SO0437928602; 51°56′52″N 3°23′34″W	16 December 1976	House	Opposite Nos.8, 9, and 10, but rear courtyard approached via St Michael Street.	7026	Upload Photo
20 Ship Street	Brecon; SO0442828587; 51°56′51″N 3°23′31″W	14 August 1964	Shop	The gabled facade occupies an important position at the top of the steep hill in Ship Street	7033	Upload Photo
Rutland House, including Forecourt Wall, Piers & Iron Railings	Brecon; SO0449328794; 51°56′58″N 3°23′28″W	16 January 1952	House	About 30 metres north of junction with Mount Street.	7041	Upload Photo
The Elms, Brecon	Brecon; SO0449828809; 51°56′58″N 3°23′28″W	16 December 1976	House	About 40 metres north of Mount Street.	7042	Upload Photo
Hamilton House, Brecon	Brecon; SO0450028835; 51°56′59″N 3°23′27″W	31 May 1961	House	About half way along block, between Mount Street and King's Steps.	7045	Upload Photo
The County House	Brecon; SO0447128791; 51°56′58″N 3°23′29″W	16 December 1976	House	18th-century townhouse on west side of The Struet, almost opposite the junction with Mount Street.	7073	The County House
Brecknock Museum	Brecon; SO0460128434; 51°56′46″N 3°23′22″W	16 January 1952	Museum	Prominently sited at Junction of The Watton and the Bulwark.	7116	See more images
Bear Hotel, Crickhowell	Crickhowell; SO2179718463; 51°51′33″N 3°08′13″W	1 April 1952	Hotel	At the top of and facing down the High St, at an angle to the road with cobbled pavement to front. Formerly known as The White Bear	7200	See more images
Crickhowell Town Hall	Crickhowell; SO2176318418; 51°51′32″N 3°08′15″W	5 September 1983	Market Hall	Overlooking 'The Square' near the junction with A40	7211	See more images
No. 24 High Street (Latham House)	Crickhowell; SO2173018352; 51°51′30″N 3°08′17″W	19 July 1963	House		7213	Upload Photo
The Dragon Hotel, Crickhowell	Crickhowell; SO2177818446; 51°51′33″N 3°08′14″W	19 July 1963	Hotel		7218	See more images
St Edmunds King and Martyr Parish Church	Crickhowell; SO2164618431; 51°51′32″N 3°08′21″W	19 July 1963	Church		7239	See more images
Upper House	Crickhowell; SO2190818493; 51°51′34″N 3°08′07″W	19 July 1963	Farmhouse		7251	Upload Photo
The Malt House	Crickhowell; SO2189018498; 51°51′35″N 3°08′08″W	19 July 1963			7248	Upload Photo
Little Malt House	Crickhowell; SO2190218498; 51°51′35″N 3°08′08″W	19 July 1963			7250	Upload Photo
Granary at the Malt House	Crickhowell; SO2188218478; 51°51′34″N 3°08′09″W	19 July 1963	Workshop		7247	Upload Photo
Gazebo at the Malt House, Crickhowell	Crickhowell; SO2189218520; 51°51′35″N 3°08′08″W	25 September 1986	Gazebo		7249	Upload Photo
Ivy Towers, Crickhowell	Crickhowell; SO2175818345; 51°51′30″N 3°08′15″W	19 July 1963	House	Set back from the road behind front garden with gable end to High Street beside the Dragon Hotel	7264	See more images
The Ivy Tower, Crickhowell	Crickhowell; SO2177518347; 51°51′30″N 3°08′14″W	19 July 1963	Tower	Beside the road, in front of the Wardens Cottage and L-plan range	7265	Upload Photo
Felin Senni	Maescar; SN9277823583; 51°54′02″N 3°33′35″W	9 May 1973	Mill	Situated on the north side of Heol Senni down short drive off the road to Defynnog.	7459	Upload Photo
Gwernyfed High School	Gwernyfed; SO1760837343; 52°01′42″N 3°12′08″W	1 May 1976	School	Located in former parkland of Old Gwernyfed, on rising ground and approached by a winding drive for approximately 300 m from the entrance gates on the road.	7464	See more images
Trericket Mill	Bronllys; SO1126941409; 52°03′50″N 3°17′45″W	27 January 1984	Mill	Situated next to the Sgithen Brook, Trericket Mil is 3.2 km north of Llyswen village, below the main road at the border between the Bronllys and Erwood communities and Brecknock and Radnor districts.	7474	Trericket Mill
Old House at Middle Gaer	Llanfihangel Cwmdu with Bwlch and Cathedine; SO1702421751; 51°53′17″N 3°12′25″W	30 August 1985	House	On the southern side of minor road between Middle and Lower Gaer, reached from the north of A40 opposite the Kestrel Inn.	7477	Upload Photo
Penoyre House	Yscir; SO0171531061; 51°58′10″N 3°25′56″W	31 January 1986	House	Set high in a landscaped park (now a golf course) above the village of Cradoc to the south; reached by a formal drive to the east.	7483	See more images
Llangoed Hall	Bronllys; SO1200440038; 52°03′06″N 3°17′05″W	28 September 1961	Country house	Located on a raised terrace on the floor of the Wye valley, within its own 4 hectares grounds and formerly associated farmland, and having staff housing and stable court to the north-northeast, separately listed.	7484	See more images
Craig-y-Nos Castle	Tawe Uchaf; SN8404215363; 51°49′29″N 3°41′02″W	14 March 1985	Country House	In the upper Tawe Valley, the grounds descending to the river, with spectacular views to the surrounding mountains.	7491	See more images
Gileston Mill	Talybont-on-Usk; SO1140122677; 51°53′44″N 3°17′20″W	19 October 1989	Mill	In the centre of Talybont Village, just north of the main street, adjacent to Afon Caerfanell, reached by a narrow lane with Talybont Farm adjacent northwest.	7500	Upload Photo
Tower House, Talgarth	Talgarth; SO1547233753; 51°59′45″N 3°13′57″W	27 March 1990	House	Located at the corner of the Square, at the side of the A479, adjoining the bridge over the River Enig.	7502	Tower House, Talgarth
Church of St Beuno, Bettws	Bettws Cedewain; SO1227496826; 52°33′44″N 3°17′44″W	3 October 1953	Church	Located in a circular churchyard, on high ground overlooking the village of Bettws Cedewain.	7548	See more images
Dolforgan Hall	Kerry, Powys; SO1430090306; 52°30′14″N 3°15′50″W	3 October 1953	Hall	Located on the valley bottom at the end of a driveway leading off the main road 1 km west of Kerry village, and set amid its former estate, with a stable building, formal garden, and shrubbery.	7561	See more images
Maesmawr Hall	Caersws; SO0404891917; 52°31′00″N 3°24′56″W	3 October 1953	Country House	The hotel is located in the Severn valley bottom, at the end of a formal axial drive off the main Newtown to Llanidloes Road, 700 m east of the junction with the A.470 to Machynlleth and level crossing.	7572	See more images
Church of St Curig, Llangurig	Llangurig; SN9078079910; 52°24′23″N 3°36′25″W	3 October 1953	Church	On the southwestern side of the village, reached from the main road and set down towards the north bank of the River Wye.	7573	See more images
Church of St Mary, Dwyriw	Llanllugan, Dwyriw; SJ0577502339; 52°36′38″N 3°23′35″W	3 October 1953	Church	Located in a prominent position in the small village of Llanllugan within a roughly circular churchyard.	7579	See more images
Church of St Gwynog, Caersws	Llanwnog, Caersws; SO0222793826; 52°32′01″N 3°26′34″W	3 October 1953	Church	The church is located in a raised oval churchyard at the centre of the village of Llanwnog, which was later extended to the south to border the B.4568.	7580	See more images
Plasau Duon	Caersws; SO0025095412; 52°32′51″N 3°28′21″W	3 October 1953	Farmhouse	The farmhouse is located on a platform above the left bank of the Afon Carno, on a farm road leading off the lane from the A.470 to Bwlch-y-garreg.	7581	See more images
Plasnewydd	Carno; SN9708996430; 52°33′21″N 3°31′10″W	3 October 1953	House	Situated on a minor road between Carno and Maesypandy, approximately 0.75 km east of the Carno church. The house is built on a sloping site, facing a yard to the north flanked by C19 farm buildings, beyond which is the road.	7583	Plasnewydd
Ystradfaelog	Trefeglwys; SN9841792474; 52°31′14″N 3°29′55″W	3 October 1953	House	Located on the western side of a lane which runs north off the B4569 towards Clatter.	7584	Upload Photo
St Michael's Church, Manafon	Manafon; SJ1131002476; 52°36′46″N 3°18′41″W	3 October 1953	Church	The church stands centrally in the formerly oval churchyard, at the centre of the village. The churchyard, which was extended circa 1926, has a lych-gate and a granite war memorial in its southern corner.	7587	See more images
Rhyd y Carw	Trefeglwys; SN9565390729; 52°30′16″N 3°32′19″W	3 October 1953	House	Located on the southern side of the lane connecting Trefeglwys to Llawr y Glyn in the west, approximately 1.4 km from Trefeglwys. Rhyd y Carw sits on the northern banks of the Afon Trannon river.	7590	Upload Photo
Talgarth	Trefeglwys; SN9629690229; 52°30′00″N 3°31′45″W	3 October 1953	House	Located on the southern side of a no-through road which runs southwest from Trefeglwys following Afon Trannon. The house is situated on the southern bank of the river, approximately 1.1 km from Trefeglwys.	7591	See more images
Cemmaes Bychan	Glantwymyn; SH8361905959; 52°38′20″N 3°43′17″W	19 December 1951	House	Located at the end of a short track off the western side of the road, close to the River Dovey.	7597	Upload Photo
Aberffrydlan	Glantwymyn; SH7794602997; 52°36′40″N 3°48′14″W	19 December 1951	House	Set down from the road close to the River Dovey, approximately 1 km west of Llanwrin.	7600	Upload Photo
Abergwydol	Cadfarch; SH7908902948; 52°36′39″N 3°47′14″W	7 February 1962	House	Located in the Dovey valley, on the northwest side of the main road, almost opposite the junction with the minor road to Abercegir.	7604	Upload Photo
Church of St Mary, Llanbrynmair	Llanbrynmair; SH8841200782; 52°35′36″N 3°38′56″W	7 February 1962	Church	Located approximately 3.2 kilometres south of Llanbrynmair on the B 4518, and set in an oval churchyard on a small hill.	7605	See more images
Pwlliwrch	Glantwymyn; SH8367001114; 52°35′43″N 3°43′08″W	4 February 1970	House	In a wooded upland location, approximately 1 km southeast of Darowen and reached by tracks running north from Tal y Wern.	7607	Upload Photo
Pen-y-Lan Hall	Meifod; SJ1587012681; 52°42′19″N 3°14′48″W	31 January 1953	House		7609	See more images
Trawscoed Hall	Guilsfield; SJ2102511789; 52°41′53″N 3°10′12″W	31 January 1953	House		7610	Trawscoed Hall
Llyswen	Guilsfield; SJ2248213526; 52°42′50″N 3°08′56″W	31 January 1953	House		7611	Upload Photo
Church of St Trunio, Llandrinio	Llandrinio; SJ2955617081; 52°44′48″N 3°02′42″W	31 January 1953	Church	Situated on southern side of road, at centre of village, within its large churchyard.	7613	See more images
Llandrinio Hall	Llandrinio; SJ2901117339; 52°44′56″N 3°03′11″W	31 January 1953	House		7615	Llandrinio Hall
Trederwen House	Llandrinio; SJ2570815786; 52°44′05″N 3°06′06″W	31 January 1953	House		7616	Upload Photo
St Garmon's Church, Llanfechain	Llanfechain; SJ1889820431; 52°46′31″N 3°12′13″W	31 January 1953	Church	In a circular churchyard at the centre of the village of Llanfechain. Stone churchyard wall, lychgate at south. Sundial shaft near path to church.	7625	See more images
Church of St Cynyw, Llangyniew	Llangyniew; SJ1271209098; 52°40′21″N 3°17′32″W	31 January 1953	Church	In the hamlet of Llangyniew, about 4 km southeast of Pontrobert. Churchyard originally circular, extended in 1926 and defined by walls and railings. The building is oriented northeast.	7633	See more images
Church of St Ffraid, Llansanffraid-ym-Mechain	Llansantffraid; SJ2204720399; 52°46′32″N 3°09′25″W	31 January 1953	Church	At north-east of the village, in an elevated situation; churchyard mostly stone-walled, with iron gates. Iron railings at Vicarage side. Sundial near porch.	7638	See more images
Cefnllyfnog Farmhouse	Llansantffraid; SJ1940818376; 52°45′25″N 3°11′44″W	31 January 1953	Farmhouse	Reached by a farm track from a minor road, about 2 km northeast of Bwlch-y-cibau.	7643	Upload Photo
Pentre'r gof	Meifod; SJ1542013800; 52°42′55″N 3°15′13″W	31 January 1953	House		7650	Upload Photo
Plas Nant-y-Meichiaid	Meifod; SJ1376516831; 52°44′32″N 3°16′44″W	31 January 1953	House		7660	Upload Photo
John Hughes Memorial Chapel	Llangyniew; SJ1093412995; 52°42′26″N 3°19′11″W	31 January 1953	Chapel	In a cul-de-sac lane to the north of Pontrobert Village (leading to Pentre-uchaf), on west side of lane; the chapel cemetery is on the opposite side (in different ownership).	7661	See more images
Church of St Michael and All Angels, Criggion	Bausley with Criggion; SJ2959215119; 52°43′45″N 3°02′39″W	26 October 1953	Church	Situated at the foot of the northern face of Breidden Hill.	7664	See more images
Admiral Rodney's Pillar	Bausley with Criggion; SJ2950714414; 52°43′22″N 3°02′43″W	26 October 1953	Monument	Situated at the top of Breidden Hill (365m) .	7667	See more images
The Vicarage, Berriew	Berriew; SJ1868400966; 52°36′01″N 3°12′07″W	26 October 1953	Vicarage		7668	Upload Photo
Glansevern Hall	Berriew; SO1964099999; 52°35′31″N 3°11′16″W	26 October 1953	Hall		7681	Glansevern Hall
Vaynor Park	Berriew; SJ1765100234; 52°35′37″N 3°13′02″W	26 October 1953	Country House	Situated in a landscaped park to the southwest of Berriew village.	7689	See more images
Cefn Bryntalch Hall	Llandyssil; SO1769896320; 52°33′31″N 3°12′56″W	26 October 1953	House	Located in a sheltered position near the top of a wooded hill which overlooks the Severn Valley. Close to a motte and bailey castle. The house is approached by a sweeping drive and is surrounded by contemporary gardens.	7714	Cefn Bryntalch Hall
Glanhafren	Welshpool; SJ2283204602; 52°38′01″N 3°08′30″W	3 November 1981	House	Between the railway line and the river to the south of Welshpool, approached via a track which leaves the A490 Montgomery Road immediately west of Cilcewydd.	7730	Upload Photo
Glanhafren Great Barn	Welshpool; SJ2282004541; 52°37′59″N 3°08′31″W	3 November 1981	Barn	South of the house at Glanhafren, and approached via a track which leaves the A490 Montgomery Road immediately west of Cilcewydd Bridge.	7733	Upload Photo
Llanerchydol Hall	Welshpool; SJ2044707571; 52°39′36″N 3°10′39″W	25 April 1950	Country House	In parkland between the Llanfair and Llanfyllin Roads to the west of Welshpool.	7736	Llanerchydol Hall
Christ Church, Welshpool	Welshpool; SJ2212507489; 52°39′34″N 3°09′10″W	25 April 1950	Church	On the edge of Powis Castle Park, prominently sited above the town.	7778	See more images
5&6 High Street	Welshpool; SJ2235207595; 52°39′38″N 3°08′58″W	3 November 1981	Shop	At the eastern corner with Park Lane.	7791	Upload Photo
Trefnant Hall	Castle Caereinion; SJ1843203926; 52°37′37″N 3°12′23″W	25 April 1950	Farmhouse	The farm is located on a raised plateau approximately 200 m north of the lane leading southwest from Welshpool.	7864	Upload Photo
Llanerch Brochwell	Guilsfield; SJ1912010211; 52°41′01″N 3°11′52″W	3 November 1981	House		7879	Upload Photo
Lower Garth	Guilsfield; SJ2176410155; 52°41′00″N 3°09′32″W	25 April 1950	House		7880	Upload Photo
Trewern House	Trewern; SJ2833911533; 52°41′48″N 3°03′43″W	3 November 1981	House		7917	Upload Photo
Trewern Hall	Trewern; SJ2680711409; 52°41′44″N 3°05′04″W	25 April 1950	Hall		7920	See more images
Bronwylfa	Montgomery; SO2227996435; 52°33′37″N 3°08′52″W	30 March 1983	House	Situated to right of Cullen House, the National Westminster Bank.	7943	Bronwylfa
Clawdd-y-dre	Montgomery; SO2237896398; 52°33′36″N 3°08′47″W	19 July 1950	House	Faces west down Lions Bank with grounds that retain the angles of former town walls.	7969	Upload Photo
Montgomery Town Hall	Montgomery; SO2221496451; 52°33′37″N 3°08′56″W	19 July 1950	Town Hall	Situated in the centre of Montgomery, facing east down Broad Street.	7974	See more images
Rock House, Montgomery	Montgomery, Powys; SO2218496454; 52°33′37″N 3°08′58″W	19 July 1950	House	Situated prominently facing east over the Market Square.	7975	Rock House, Montgomery
Newtown Baptist Church	Newtown and Llanllwchaiarn; SO1092191432; 52°30′49″N 3°18′51″W	5 September 1988	Church	Prominently sited at the corner of New Church Street with New Road.	8144	See more images
Tomb of Robert Owen	Newtown and Llanllwchaiarn; SO1089891800; 52°31′00″N 3°18′52″W	5 September 1988	Grave	Set against the south side of the former Parish Church.	8154	See more images
Penarth House	Newtown and Llanllwchaiarn; SO1392892455; 52°31′23″N 3°16′12″W	18 July 1949	House	Stands in its own grounds 3/4 mile southwest of the junction of Pool Road with the B4389.	8217	See more images
Sion United Reformed Church, Llanidloes (now Trinity Church)	Llanidloes; SN9535084601; 52°26′58″N 3°32′29″W	4 October 1989	Church	Short Bridge Street	8371	See more images
Dol-Llys Hall	Llanidloes; SN9595785722; 52°27′34″N 3°31′58″W	3 October 1953	House	Reached from the by-road that branches northeast off the Trefeglwys road (B 4569) about 1 mile from the town; short straight drive up to the house which is set in extensive wooded grounds with lake.	8388	See more images
The Court House, 104-106 Heol Maengwyn	Machynlleth; SH7500400825; 52°35′27″N 3°50′48″W	19 January 1952	House	At the east end of the street; detached to left	/ 8460 8459 / 8460	The Court House, 104-106 Heol Maengwyn
Royal House, Machynlleth	Machynlleth; SH7454300854; 52°35′28″N 3°51′12″W	19 January 1952	Shop	In the centre of the town, on the corner of Penrallt and Garsiwn.	8469	See more images
Plas Machynlleth	Machynlleth; SH7455800555; 52°35′18″N 3°51′11″W	16 February 1990	Country House	To the south of the town centre, set in its own grounds.	8499	See more images
Llynlloedd	Machynlleth; SH7503100282; 52°35′09″N 3°50′46″W	19 January 1952	House		8504	Upload Photo
Pont-ar-Dyfi	Machynlleth; SH7441901902; 52°36′01″N 3°51′20″W	19 January 1952	Bridge	Spanning the River Dyfi to the north of the town, linking Powys with Gwynedd, Montgomeryshire with Meirioneth.	8506	See more images
Council house, Llanfyllin	Llanfyllin; SJ1414219528; 52°45′59″N 3°16′26″W	25 October 1951			8574	Upload Photo
Llanfyllin Manor House	Llanfyllin; SJ1412119452; 52°45′57″N 3°16′27″W	25 October 1951	Manor House	At the southern corner of Square and Narrow Street.	8624	Upload Photo
Cruck barn at Rhosfawr	Llanfyllin; SJ0967221634; 52°47′05″N 3°20′27″W	22 March 1993	Barn		8641	Upload Photo
Ty Mawr, Trefeglwys	Trefeglwys; SN9572289905; 52°29′49″N 3°32′15″W	2 December 1974	House	Located at the end of a track off a no-through road which follows the Nant y Bachws, a tributary of Afon Trannon. On low-lying ground located approximately 1.8 km southwest of Trefeglwys.	8646	Upload Photo
Friends' Meeting House, Dolobran	Meifod; SJ1237012420; 52°42′08″N 3°17′54″W	21 November 1974	Meeting House		8649	Upload Photo
Garth-fawr	Llangyniew; SJ1170913115; 52°42′31″N 3°18′30″W	10 December 1978	House	Reached by a lane east of a minor road to the north-east of the village of Pontrobert.	8658	Upload Photo
Poultry House	Forden; SJ2486904101; 52°37′46″N 3°06′41″W	24 December 1982	House	Approximately 0.9m southeast of Leighton Hall and reached from a minor road east of B4388 from which a short private road leads through a forestry plantation to the cottage and Poultry House.	8667	See more images
Church of the Holy Trinity, Leighton	Leighton, Forden; SJ2426805959; 52°38′46″N 3°07′15″W	24 December 1982	Church	Prominently sited on eastern side of the Severn valley, beside a minor road on eastern side of B4388, and at the northern entrance to Leighton Farm. The church is situated within a walled churchyard.	8668	See more images
Piggery and Sheep Shed, Leighton Farm	Forden; SJ2425705285; 52°38′24″N 3°07′15″W	24 December 1982	Piggery	Situated at the northern end of Leighton Farm.	8670	See more images
Fodder Storage Building north of former Root Shed, Leighton Farm.	Forden; SJ2430105256; 52°38′23″N 3°07′12″W	24 December 1982	Barn	Situated on the eastern side of Leighton Farm with the former Root Shed to the south and minor road to the east.	8671	Upload Photo
Fodder Storage Building northeast of former Root Shed, Leighton Farm	Forden; SJ2434505254; 52°38′23″N 3°07′10″W	24 December 1982	Barn	Situated on the eastern side of a minor road through Leighton Farm. The remaining group of farm buildings are on the opposite side of the road.	8672	Upload Photo
Former Root Shed, Leighton Farm	Forden; SJ2430405230; 52°38′22″N 3°07′12″W	24 December 1982	Root Shed	Situated at the southeastern corner of Leighton Farm and at the corner of a junction of minor roads through Leighton. The former Root Shed has a brick wall with stone coping on its east side.	8673	See more images
Gwernfyda	Dwyriw; SJ0449601754; 52°36′19″N 3°24′42″W	5 September 1985	House	Located approximately 1.5 km southwest of Llanllugan, on a lane which links Cefn Coch with Adfa. The house is situated on a probable platform site at the bottom of a hillside, facing southeast.	8679	Upload Photo
Ffinnant Farmhouse	Llansantffraid; SJ2079721119; 52°46′55″N 3°10′33″W	2 March 1992	Farmhouse	At the boundary between the Llansantffraid and Llanfechain communities. Reached along a farm lane off the northern side of B4393, beside Foel Hill, approximately 1 km west of Llansantffraid-ym-Mechain. It faces north across the farmyard towards a barn.	8703	Upload Photo
Neuadd Cynhinfa	Llangyniew; SJ0867712402; 52°42′06″N 3°21′11″W	21 September 1992	House	Situated on a broad upland site approximately 3 km southeast of Dolanog, reached from a lane northeast off the B4382. The house has a cobbled forecourt with well, with farmyard ranging to the east.	8709	Upload Photo
Bryngwyn Hall	Meifod; SJ1782918123; 52°45′16″N 3°13′08″W	17 January 1979	House		8710	Upload Photo
Slurry Tank, Forden	Forden; SJ2496205451; 52°38′30″N 3°06′37″W	7 February 1993	Slurry Tank	Situated at the top of Moel y Mab, approximately 0.9 km southeast of the Leighton church. It can be reached via a private road headed west off a minor road connecting Leighton to Trelystan.	8715	Slurry Tank, Forden
Cwmhir Abbey	Abbeycwmhir; SO0558171106; 52°19′48″N 3°23′13″W	12 December 1952	Abbey (ruined)	In a field approximately 250 m south-southeast of the parish church and on the northern side of the Clywedog Brook.	8717	See more images
Ty Faenor, Abbey Cwmhir	Abbeycwmhir; SO0714771092; 52°19′48″N 3°21′50″W	12 December 1952	House	On the eastern side of a minor road between Abbey Cwmhir and Llananno, approximately 1.7 km east of the parish church.	8718	Upload Photo
Church of St Padarn, Llanbadarn Fawr	Llanbadarn Fawr; SO0869864302; 52°16′09″N 3°20′22″W	12 December 1952	Church	Located in a churchyard near Crossgates, accessible by heading south from the main road junction in Crossgates for 0.6 km and stopping on the right.	8720	See more images
Church of St Michael, Llanyre	Llanyre; SO0457264388; 52°16′10″N 3°24′00″W	12 December 1952	Church	In a round churchyard on the eastern side of a minor road, approximately 2 km north of Llanyre.	8721	See more images
Barn at Cefn Ceido Farm	Nantmel; SN9836068212; 52°18′09″N 3°29′31″W	12 December 1952	Barn	On the southwestern side of the farmhouse.	8726	Upload Photo
Gilfach farmhouse including attached former cow house	St Harmon; SN9649171711; 52°20′01″N 3°31′14″W	6 January 1972	Farmhouse	Approximately 2.5 km west-southwest of St. Harmon, accessible via a private road headed south from a minor road connecting St. Harmon to Pont Marteg.	8732	Upload Photo
Church of St Michael, Bryngwyn	Bryngwyn, Painscastle; SO1866649488; 52°08′16″N 3°11′23″W	18 September 1960	Church	Elevated site, sub-circular churchyard, reached along by-road running north from Rhosgoch.	8736	See more images
Ashbrook House	Clyro; SO2145143859; 52°05′15″N 3°08′52″W	18 September 1962	House	House built circa 1852, listed for its associations to the Rev Francis Kilvert.	8740	Ashbrook House
Barn at Old Vicarage (including attached granary and stores)	Glasbury; SO1773739045; 52°02′37″N 3°12′03″W	18 September 1960	Barn	The barn is located immediately northeast of the Old Vicarage, with a forecourt to the end of the lane, all within the bend of the River Wye.	8755	Upload Photo
Church of St Peter, Llanbedr Painscastle	Llanbedr, Painscastle; SO1414446395; 52°06′33″N 3°15′18″W	18 September 1960	Church		8760	See more images
Church of St Teilo, Llandeilo Graban	Llandeilo Graban, Painscastle; SO0937144689; 52°05′35″N 3°19′27″W	18 September 1960	Church	At the northern side of a banked circular churchyard high above the River Wye.	8767	See more images
Penisarplwyf, Llandeilo Graban	Llandeilo Graban, Painscastle; SO1182044111; 52°05′18″N 3°17′18″W	18 September 1960	House		8769	Upload Photo
Church of St David, Colva	Colva, Gladestry; SO1996953132; 52°10′14″N 3°10′18″W	21 September 1962	Church	The church is set into the hill slope above the by-road from Gladestry to Glascwm.	8773	See more images
Stone House, Gladestry	Gladestry; SO2361154498; 52°11′00″N 3°07′07″W	21 September 1962	House		8777	Stone House, Gladestry
Baynham Hall	Gladestry; SO2319751298; 52°09′17″N 3°07′27″W	21 September 1962	Hall		8783	Upload Photo
Church of Michael and All Angels, Beguildy	Beguildy; SO1944379732; 52°24′35″N 3°11′08″W	24 October 1951	Church	Within a churchyard on the western side and set above the B4355, entered from a lane on the southern side.	8791	See more images
Llanddewi Hall	Llanddewi Ystradenny; SO1084968717; 52°18′34″N 3°18′33″W	24 October 1951	Hall	Set back on the eastern side of the road through the village approximately 100 m north-northeast of the parish church.	8796	Upload Photo
Lawn Farm, Beguildy	Beguildy; SO2063976386; 52°22′47″N 3°10′02″W	29 May 1968	Farmhouse	Approximately 3.5 km south-southeast of Beguildy, accessible by taking a minor road west of B4355, with Lawn Farm located on its northern side.	8798	Upload Photo
Far Hall, Llanddewi Ystradenny	Llanddewi Ystradenny; SO1444968617; 52°18′32″N 3°15′23″W	20 April 1972	House	Approximately 1.6 km north-northeast of Dolau hamlet, reached from the south by a farm road through Tregrugyn Farm.	8801	Upload Photo
Church of St Cewydd, Aberedw	Aberedw; SO0802647316; 52°06′59″N 3°20′41″W	31 May 1962	Church	Within a churchyard on the southern side of the road through the village and on the northern side of the River Edw.	8803	See more images
Church of St David, Cregrina	Cregrina, Glascwm; SO1236552100; 52°09′37″N 3°16′57″W	31 May 1962	Church	In a churchyard above and on the western side of the main road through the hamlet. Not to be confused with the grade I listed St David's church at nearby Glascwm.	8805	See more images
Cefndyrys	Llanelwedd; SO0394452968; 52°10′00″N 3°24′21″W	31 May 1962	House	In its own grounds on the western side of the A483, overlooking Builth Wells approximately 2 km to the south.	8808	Upload Photo
The Old Mill, Glascwm	Glascwm; SO1137954567; 52°10′56″N 3°17′51″W	31 May 1962	Mill	Set back on the eastern side of the road approximately 100 m north of Hundred House Inn.	8811	Upload Photo
Old Rectory, Presteigne	Presteigne; SO3151964514; 52°16′28″N 3°00′18″W	28 November 1950	House		8825	Upload Photo
Presteigne Shire Hall including branch library and museum	Presteigne; SO3151064437; 52°16′26″N 3°00′19″W	28 November 1950	Museum	Wide neo-classical public building set into slope.	8845	See more images
Radnorshire Arms	Presteigne; SO3128264545; 52°16′29″N 3°00′31″W	28 November 1950	Public House		8888	See more images
Presteigne Manor House	Presteigne; SO3136464584; 52°16′30″N 3°00′27″W	26 March 1985	Rectory	St David's Street	8912	Presteigne Manor House
Upper Dolley House	Dolley Green, Presteigne; SO2845665415; 52°16′56″N 3°03′01″W	25 May 1972	House		8935	Upper Dolley House
Old Impton Farmhouse, Norton	Presteigne; SO2920267046; 52°17′49″N 3°02′22″W	24 October 1951	Farmhouse		8941	Upload Photo
Church of Saint Andrew, Norton	Norton, Presteigne; SO3045767256; 52°17′57″N 3°01′16″W	26 March 1985	Church	On the eastern side of the B4355 at the northern end of the village.	8952	See more images
Wegnall Old Farmhouse	Presteigne; SO3231663096; 52°15′43″N 2°59′35″W	25 May 1972	Farmhouse	Close by Hindwell Brook (marking the English border) and reached by an irregular farm track from the Presteigne to Kington road	also 9332 8957, also 9332	Wegnall Old Farmhouse
Stanage Park	Knighton; SO3327171735; 52°20′23″N 2°58′51″W	30 September 1985	Country house		9045	See more images
The Automobile Palace	Llandrindod Wells; SO0604660916; 52°14′18″N 3°22′38″W	30 September 1985	Exhibition hall	On corner with Spa Road East and with flank elevation on Princes Avenue.	9064	See more images
Church of St Michael, Cascob	Cascob, Whitton; SO2390166404; 52°17′26″N 3°07′02″W	24 October 1951	Church	Situated at the head of the Cascob valley below the slopes of Radnor Forest. Approached by the valley road from Discoed crossroads.	9079	See more images
Maes Treylow, Discoed	Discoed, Whitton; SO2673065287; 52°16′51″N 3°04′32″W	20 April 1972	House		9091	Upload Photo
Upper House, Discoed	Discoed, Whitton; SO2767364688; 52°16′32″N 3°03′41″W	16 March 1992	House		9093	Upload Photo
Church of St Mary, Pilleth	Pilleth, Whitton; SO2563268237; 52°18′26″N 3°05′32″W	24 October 1951	Church	Situated on a prominent platform site on the lower slopes of Bryn Glas, lying just above Pilleth Court and the B4356 Presteigne to Llangunllo road.	9108	See more images
Burfa	Old Radnor; SO2794261357; 52°14′44″N 3°03′25″W	21 September 1962	Farmhouse	Lying below the prehistoric earthworks of Burfa Bank, with 2 castle mottes nearby and Offa's Dyke running in front of the house.	9145	Burfa
Walton Court, Old Radnor	Old Radnor; SO2568959822; 52°13′54″N 3°05′22″W	13 December 1951	House		9191	Upload Photo
Lower House, Walton	Old Radnor; SO2594259772; 52°13′52″N 3°05′09″W	21 September 1962	House		9192	Upload Photo
Monument to Sir George Cornewall Lewis	New Radnor; SO2138160735; 52°14′21″N 3°09′10″W	30 January 1992	Monument	Situated at the Y-junction between Broad Street and Water Street at southeastern end of the village; reached north off A44	9205	See more images
Downton House	New Radnor; SO2307460600; 52°14′18″N 3°07′41″W	21 September 1962	House		9237	Upload Photo
The Pales Coed-Swydd	Penybont; SO1380164057; 52°16′04″N 3°15′53″W	21 September 1962	House		9304	Upload Photo
Ciliau	Painscastle; SO1081442936; 52°04′39″N 3°18′10″W	9 July 1979	House	Situated on rock plateau above east bank of River Wye, 1 mile south east of Erwood.	9340	Upload Photo
Upper Skynlais Farmhouse	Glasbury; SO1584739422; 52°02′48″N 3°13′43″W	6 July 1984	Farmhouse	The farmhouse is located at the end of a farm lane leading northwest from Cwmbach. It stands on the brow of a hill, with its farm buildings on the lower east side.	9342	Upload Photo
Knucklas Railway Viaduct	Beguildy; SO2499074243; 52°21′40″N 3°06′11″W	11 August 1985	Viaduct	Spanning the valley on the western side of the village.	9345	Knucklas Railway Viaduct
Church of St Mary, Abbey Cwmhir	Abbeycwmhir; SO0539671310; 52°19′54″N 3°23′23″W	12 April 1985	Church	Within a churchyard in the centre of the village, on the western side of Cwm Poeth brook.	9346	See more images
Upper house, Painscastle	Painscastle; SO1670746140; 52°06′26″N 3°13′03″W	8 March 1987	House		9349	Upload Photo
Nos 27 and 28 Hereford Street	Presteigne; SO3161664214; 52°16′19″N 3°00′13″W	30 December 1993	House		9372	Upload Photo
Church of Saint Mary, Ystradfellte	Ystradfellte; SN9305713446; 51°48′34″N 3°33′09″W	6 June 1962	Church	In the churchyard in the centre of the village.	11385	See more images
Pont Llanymynech	Carreghofa; SJ2682420446; 52°46′36″N 3°05′10″W	4 May 1993	Bridge	Main road bridge over River Vyrnwy on the southern edge of the village.	14194	Pont Llanymynech
Aqueduct carrying Montgomeryshire Canal over River Vyrnwy	Carreghofa; SJ2540619635; 52°46′09″N 3°06′25″W	4 May 1993	Aqueduct	Aqueduct parallel to B4398 road bridge over the River Vyrnwy	14206	See more images
Llwyncyntefin	Maescar; SN9239729413; 51°57′10″N 3°34′02″W	22 November 1973	House	Situated some 300 m north of Pont Llwyncyntefin on the eastern side of the road to Pentre'rfelin.	14899	Upload Photo
Church of St Cynllo, Llanbister	Llanbister; SO1099473308; 52°21′02″N 3°18′29″W	24 October 1951	Church	Occupying a steep site in the centre of the village, on the southern side of the B4356.	15013	See more images
Church of St Michael and All Angels, Clyro	Clyro; SO2133543834; 52°05′14″N 3°08′58″W	31 January 1995	Church	Orientated south west/north east in rubble-walled subcircular churchyard in village centre	15196	See more images
Baskerville Hall Hotel	Clyro; SO2077642840; 52°04′42″N 3°09′27″W	31 January 1995	Hotel		15314	Upload Photo
Barn Range North of Clyro Court Farmhouse	Clyro; SO2125143365; 52°04′59″N 3°09′02″W	25 February 1952	Barn	Set at a slight angle alongside the service road to Clyro Court Farm from the village of Clyro.	15316	Upload Photo
Attached Gateway north of Clyro Court Farmhouse	Clyro; SO2124143297; 52°04′57″N 3°09′03″W	25 February 1952	Gateway	Set at a slight angle alongside the service road to Clyro Court Farm from the village of Clyro.	15317	Upload Photo
Church of Holy Trinity, Bettws	Clyro; SO2278547325; 52°07′08″N 3°07′45″W	31 January 1995	Church	Situated 4 km northeast of Clyro and 1.5 km west of Rhydspence.	15318	See more images
Cabalva House	Clyro; SO2402446712; 52°06′49″N 3°06′39″W	31 January 1995	Country House		15326	Cabalva House
Lower Rabber, Gladestry	Gladestry; SO2513854348; 52°10′56″N 3°05′47″W	31 January 1995	House		15342	Upload Photo
Footbridge and boundary wall on the northern side of Leighton Hall.	Forden; SJ2415804706; 52°38′05″N 3°07′20″W	24 December 1982	Footbridge	Located on the northern boundary of the landscape gardens of Leighton Hall, with the Serpentine Pond immediately to the south.	15627	Upload Photo
Footbridge east of Leighton Hall Tower	Forden; SJ2419604585; 52°38′01″N 3°07′17″W	24 December 1982	Footbridge	Situated east of Leighton Hall Tower, south of Serpentine Pond and northeast of a terrace walk at Leighton Hall.	15628	Upload Photo
Grotto at Maesfron House	Trewern; SJ2811611426; 52°41′45″N 3°03′54″W	24 January 1995	Grotto	Built into the steep bank in the gardens of Maesfron House.	15641	Grotto at Maesfron House
Llwyn Melyn Farmhouse	Trewern; SJ2878211168; 52°41′37″N 3°03′19″W	3 November 1981	Farmhouse		15645	Upload Photo
Llandinam Bridge	Llandinam; SO0252188585; 52°29′11″N 3°26′13″W	15 February 1994	Bridge	Set at right angles to the main A.470 on the northern edge of Llandinam village, and carrying the by-road west over the River Severn.	15653	See more images
Statue and pedestal, to David Davies of Llandinam	Llandinam; SO0253588595; 52°29′12″N 3°26′12″W	3 October 1953	Statue	Situated at the roadside, set back from the eastern end of Llandinam Bridge.	15654	See more images
Park Farmhouse, Groes-Lwyd	Guilsfield; SJ2019711294; 52°41′36″N 3°10′56″W	22 February 1995	Farmhouse		15807	Upload Photo
Maesmawr Hall, Guilsfield	Guilsfield; SJ1667209660; 52°40′42″N 3°14′02″W	22 February 1995	House		15810	Upload Photo
Goetre, Pentre	Meifod; SJ1474913787; 52°42′54″N 3°15′48″W	26 May 1995	House		15990	Upload Photo
Llangwathan Farmhouse	Llanigon; SO2446740311; 52°03′22″N 3°06′11″W	20 June 1995	Farmhouse		16127	Upload Photo
Craig Coch Dam and valve tower, Elan Valley	Rhayader; SN8936468669; 52°18′18″N 3°37′27″W	31 July 1995	Dam/Valve tower		16198	See more images
Penygarreg Dam and valve tower, Elan Valley	Rhayader; SN9113767414; 52°17′39″N 3°35′52″W	31 July 1995	Dam/Valve tower		16199	See more images
Carreg ddu Viaduct	Rhayader; SN9103963955; 52°15′47″N 3°35′53″W	31 July 1995	Dam/Viaduct	About 7 km southwest of Rhayader, it forms the road connecting the Elan and Claerwan vallies.	16200	Carreg ddu Viaduct
Foel Valve Tower, Elan Valley	Rhayader; SN9106164071; 52°15′50″N 3°35′52″W	31 July 1995	Valve tower	Near northeast end of Carreg Ddu viaduct.	16201	See more images
Caban Coch Dam	Rhayader; SN9247164475; 52°16′04″N 3°34′38″W	31 July 1995	Dam	About 6 km southwest of Rhayader.	16202	See more images
Lower Cil Farmhouse, Cil	Berriew; SJ1825501604; 52°36′22″N 3°12′31″W	21 August 1995	Farmhouse		16363	Upload Photo
Stable block at Vaynor Park	Berriew; SJ1758700205; 52°35′36″N 3°13′05″W	21 August 1995	Stable		16401	Upload Photo
Former Powysland Museum & Library	Welshpool; SJ2260707682; 52°39′41″N 3°08′45″W	29 February 1996	Museum	Built around 2 sides of No 1 Salop Road, with the museum facing Salop Road, and the library facing onto Red Bank.	16704	Former Powysland Museum & Library
Statue of Fame in entrance courtyard at Powis Castle	Welshpool; SJ2154906414; 52°38′59″N 3°09′40″W	29 February 1996	Statue	Forms the centrepiece of the courtyard on the western side of the castle.	16785	See more images
Statue of Hercules at the eastern edge of the Top Terrace in Powis Castle Gardens	Welshpool; SJ2164706490; 52°39′02″N 3°09′35″W	29 February 1996	Statue	Towards the eastern end of the top terrace of the gardens, close to the great yew hedge.	16786	See more images
Powis Estate Sawmill with cast-iron launder	Welshpool; SJ2216105857; 52°38′42″N 3°09′07″W	29 February 1996	Sawmill	Approximately 1.6 km south of Welshpool, along the road.	16797	Upload Photo
Detached belltower at the church of St. Mary	Bronllys; SO1439234914; 52°00′22″N 3°14′55″W	28 September 1961	Belltower	Located within the churchyard of the Church of St. Mary, approximately 10 m northeast of the chancel.	16833	See more images
Church of St Llwchaiarn, Llandyssil	Llandyssil; SO1577993173; 52°31′48″N 3°14′35″W	26 October 1953	Church	Located on a narrow lane 400 m north of Llanmerewig village to the east of Church Farm. The church is situated in an oval churchyard bounded by a masonry wall.	17008	See more images
Stable Block at Gwernyfed High School	Gwernyfed; SO1758437382; 52°01′43″N 3°12′10″W	1 May 1976	Stable	Located on the northeastern side of the front forecourt to Gwernyfed High School, Gwernyfed Park, and attached to the northern corner of the house.	17047	Upload Photo
South tower in the inner front garden with a garden wall running to the southwestern ring of Old Gwernyfed.	Gwernyfed; SO1827036517; 52°01′16″N 3°11′33″W	28 September 1961	Tower	Located at the southeastern corner of the inner courtyard in front of Old Gwernyfed.	17051	Upload Photo
Gatepiers and garden walls to inner court in front of Old Gwernyfed.	Gwernyfed; SO1828236531; 52°01′16″N 3°11′32″W	28 September 1961	Gate Piers	Located axially on the approaching driveway to the main southeastern front of Old Gwernyfed, and placed symmetrically between the corner towers.	17052	Gatepiers and garden walls to inner court in front of Old Gwernyfed.
Boughrood Court	Glasbury; SO1271039383; 52°02′45″N 3°16′27″W	18 January 1996	House	Located 100 m northwest of Boughrood church across a small tributary of the River Wye, Boughrood Court has its own grounds and an associated farm to the north, consisting of a farmyard, buildings and mill.	17187	Boughrood Court
Boughrood Cottage	Glasbury; SO1270639360; 52°02′45″N 3°16′27″W	18 January 1996	House	Located 100 m to the northwest of Boughrood church across a small tributary of the River Wye, within its own grounds, and with its farmyard, buildings and mill to the north.	17188	Upload Photo
Gregynog Hall	Tregynon; SO0844697481; 52°34′03″N 3°21′08″W	9 June 1996	Country House	1.7 km southwest of parish church, in a large area of parkland and gardens. The house faces roughly southeast.	17256	See more images
Plas Dinam	Llandinam; SO0296989105; 52°29′28″N 3°25′50″W	26 November 1996	House	Plas Dinam stands on an elevated plateau above the valley of the Severn, about 1 km north of the village centre. It is approached from a formal driveway from the A470 Caersws to Llanidloes Road.	17771	Upload Photo
Glyn Celyn	Felinfach; SO0857632727; 51°59′08″N 3°19′58″W	29 November 1995	House	West of A470, approximately 1 km southwest of Felinfach, in its own grounds.	17921	Upload Photo
Brynderwen Bridge and Bridge 147 over the Montgomeryshire Canal	Llandyssil; SO1621395171; 52°32′53″N 3°14′13″W	14 July 1997	Bridge	Two bridges on the B4368 that link the A483 with Abermule village. Brynderwen bridge crosses the River Severn, to the east of bridge 147 over the Montgomeryshire canal.	18513	See more images
Carmel Independent Chapel	Nantmel; SO0541566577; 52°17′21″N 3°23′17″W	11 April 1997	Chapel	Set back on the northern side of a minor road north of the A44, approximately 2 km east-northeast of Nantmel.	19016	See more images
Threshing Barn and Granary, Leighton Farm	Forden; SJ2425705257; 52°38′23″N 3°07′15″W	24 December 1982	Barn	Situated in the centre of Leighton Farm with Stockyards I and II to the northeast and northwest respectively, and Stockyard IV to the south.	19507	Upload Photo
Cart Shed, Leighton Farm	Forden; SJ2429205232; 52°38′22″N 3°07′13″W	20 March 1998	Cart Shed	Situated within the main group of buildings at Leighton Farm. The Cart Shed stands immediately west of the former Root Shed and north of Maes-y-Gro. On its western side is a small yard with farm road.	19508	Upload Photo
Mill and Tank House, Leighton Farm	Forden; SJ2425805322; 52°38′25″N 3°07′15″W	20 March 1998	Mill	Towards the northern end of Leighton Farm with Piggery and Sheep Shed to the north, farm road and Stockyards I and II to the south, with the Granary attached to the southern side above the road.	19509	See more images
Stockyard I, Leighton Farm	Forden; SJ2427805274; 52°38′24″N 3°07′14″W	20 March 1998	Stockyard	On the eastern side of Leighton Farm with a farm road to the north, a minor road to the east, a Fodder Storage Building to the south. The upper level of the western range is the Granary attached to the Threshing Barn and Mill and is the partition between Stockyard I and Stockyard II.	19510	Upload Photo
Stockyard II, Leighton Farm	Forden; SJ2423905274; 52°38′24″N 3°07′16″W	20 March 1998	Stockyard	On the western side of Leighton Farm with Stockyard III to the west, Hay Storage Building to the south. The upper level of the eastern range is the Granary attached to the Threshing Barn and Mill. The eastern range is also the partition between Stockyard I and Stockyard II.	19511	Upload Photo
Stockyard III, Leighton Farm	Forden; SJ2420805270; 52°38′24″N 3°07′17″W	20 March 1998	Stockyard	On the western side of Leighton Farm with a farm road on northern and western sides. On the eastern side is Stockyard II and Hay Storage Building; to the south are further stockhouses.	19512	See more images
Hay Storage Building, Leighton Farm	Forden; SJ2422005260; 52°38′23″N 3°07′17″W	20 March 1998	Barn	On the western side of Leighton Farm with Threshing Barn to the east, Stockyard II to the north, Stockyard III to the west and stockhouses to the south.	19513	See more images
Stockyard IV, Leighton Farm	Forden; SJ2425605231; 52°38′22″N 3°07′15″W	20 March 1998	Stockyard	Situated in the centre of Leighton Farm with Threshing Barn to the north and Stable to the south.	19514	Upload Photo
Former Office and Stock Houses north of Poolton and Gortheur, Leighton Farm.	Forden; SJ2421005240; 52°38′23″N 3°07′17″W	20 March 1998	Office	Situated on the western side of Leighton Farm with farm road to the west, Stockyard III and Hay Storage Building attached to the north, and Poolton and Gortheur attached to the south.	19515	See more images
Stable, Leighton Farm	Forden; SJ2425505216; 52°38′22″N 3°07′15″W	20 March 1998	Stable	Situated at the southern end of Leighton Farm, fronting a minor road through Leighton. The building is attached to Stockyard IV at its northern end.	19516	Upload Photo
West Stockhouse, Leighton Farm	Forden; SJ2418705258; 52°38′23″N 3°07′18″W	20 March 1998	Stockhouse	Situated at the western end of Leighton Farm with a walled yard to the west and farm road to the east.	19517	Upload Photo
Former Sheep-Drying Shed, with attached walls, Leighton Farm	Forden; SJ2419605325; 52°38′25″N 3°07′18″W	20 March 1998	Sheep Shed	Situated on the northwestern side of Leighton Farm, with Piggery and Sheep Shed to the east. Its attached wall continues south as West Stockyard Wall.	19519	Upload Photo
Footbridge east of Serpentine Pond at Leighton Hall	Forden; SJ2422904682; 52°38′05″N 3°07′16″W	24 December 1982	Footbridge	Situated to the east of the Serpentine Pond, on the northeastern side of the landscape gardens at Leighton Hall.	19531	Upload Photo
Church of All Saints, Forden	Forden; SJ2635903935; 52°37′41″N 3°05′22″W	26 October 1953	Church	Isolated building high up on Long Mountain and situated east of a minor road between Leighton and Marton. The church is reached down a private track and has a woodland plantation to its east.	19546	Upload Photo
Stable courtyard at Treberfydd	Llangors; SO1291525529; 51°55′17″N 3°16′04″W	17 January 1963	Stable	Attached to the northwest side of Treberfydd mansion with main entrance from front terrace; also rear drive entrance.	20284	Upload Photo
Cathedine Fawr farmhouse including attached kitchen and granary range	Llangors; SO1460526081; 51°55′36″N 3°14′36″W	21 August 1998	Farmhouse	On rising ground overlooking Llangorse Lake from the east, just above the main road to Llangorse village and north of the hamlet of Cathedine.	20285	Upload Photo
Two granaries at Ty Mawr	Llangors; SO1243626030; 51°55′33″N 3°16′29″W	21 August 1998	Granary	Standing side by side and linked by a screen wall. Forming the southern side of a courtyard for Ty Mawr, reached by a farm track.	20312	Upload Photo
Tretower Court Barn	Llanfihangel Cwmdu with Bwlch and Cathedine; SO1862121198; 51°53′00″N 3°11′01″W	21 October 1998	Barn	100 m south of the Tretower church and on the east side of a minor road opposite of Tretower Court.	20660	Tretower Court Barn
Glanusk Bridge	Llanfihangel Cwmdu with Bwlch and Cathedine; SO1921019912; 51°52′19″N 3°10′30″W	21 October 1998	Bridge	On the southern side of Penmyarth Park. The bridge crosses the river Usk with a lodge at its southern end.	20666	Glanusk Bridge
Tower Lodge and Glanusk Bridge (partly in Llanfihangel Cwmdu with Bwlch and Cathedine community)	Llangattock; SO1921919857; 51°52′17″N 3°10′29″W	21 October 1998	Lodge and Bridge	The lodge and bridge are located towards the northern side of Glanusk Park. The bridge crosses the River Usk with the lodge at its southern end.	20689	Tower Lodge and Glanusk Bridge (partly in Llanfihangel Cwmdu with Bwlch and Cathedine community)
Bank of Limekilns	Llangattock; SO2062517282; 51°50′55″N 3°09′13″W	21 October 1998	Limekiln	Located immediately north of Upper Yard Bridge (Canal Bridge No. 115), on the western side of the Monmouthshire and Brecon Canal.	20706	Bank of Limekilns
The Stable Court	Llangattock; SO1941419522; 51°52′06″N 3°10′19″W	21 October 1998	House	Located in the centre of Glanusk Park, to the southwest of the site of the former house, and northeast of the Home Farm.	20715	Upload Photo
Llan Wysg	Llangattock; SO2058818764; 51°51′43″N 3°09′17″W	21 October 1998	House	Situated to the northwest of Dardy hamlet, on the northern side of the B4558 road, where the ground slopes down to the River Usk. The house is approached by a driveway from the southeast.	20723	Upload Photo
'Peach House' at Plas Llangattwg including attached former boiler-house	Llangattock; SO2125017837; 51°51′13″N 3°08′41″W	21 October 1998	House	Located in the kitchen gardens at Plas Llangattwg. The western end of the structure forms part of a long masonry wall which divides the formal gardens from the kitchen gardens.	20726	Upload Photo
Church of St Meugan, Talybont on Usk	Talybont-on-Usk; SO0867324537; 51°54′43″N 3°19′45″W	17 January 1963	Church	At Llanfeugan, in an isolated position southwest of the hamlet of Pencelli, on the western bank of a deep-cutting stream, surrounded by an elliptical churchyard with stone stile entrance.	21105	See more images
Limekilns at Brynhyfryd	Talybont-on-Usk; SO1170022391; 51°53′35″N 3°17′04″W	17 December 1998	Limekiln	On the southern bank of the Canal, within the grounds of Brynhyfryd, on the eastern edge of the village of Talybont.	21108	Limekilns at Brynhyfryd
The Tennis Pavilion	Talybont-on-Usk; SO1325521653; 51°53′12″N 3°15′42″W	17 December 1998	Pavilion	At the foot of Buckland Hill on the lane leading to the rear of Buckland Hall, facing the park.	21158	Upload Photo
Castle Farm farmhouse	Talybont on Usk; SO0947024930; 51°54′56″N 3°19′03″W	17 December 1998	Farmhouse	On the eastern side of Pencelli village surrounded on three sides by the former castle earthworks with the canal bordering these to the north.	21163	Upload Photo
Glan Ithon, including attached farm buildings	Llanyre; SO0585263874; 52°15′54″N 3°22′52″W	18 June 1999	House	Approximately 2 km northeast of Llanyre, reached by a drive on the southeastern side of a minor road connecting Llanyre to Crossgates.	21878	Upload Photo
Capel Seion including Railings	Llanrhaeadr ym Mochnant (S); SJ1223126099; 52°49′31″N 3°18′14″W	18 July 2000	Chapel	Situated on the northern side of the square just west of the bridge in the centre of Llanrhaeadr-ym-Mochnant.	23524	See more images
Eglwys Oen Duw	Treflys; SN9134052113; 52°09′24″N 3°35′23″W	30 October 2000	Church	On the eastern side of a minor road connecting Beulah to Abergwesyn, approximately 1.2 km northwest of Beulah village.	24349	See more images
Caban Coch dam (partly in Rhayader community)	Llanwrthwl; SN9247364436; 52°16′03″N 3°34′38″W	31 July 1995	Dam	Approximately 6 km southwest of Rhayader.	24389	See more images
Church of St David, Llanwrtyd Wells	Llanwrtyd Wells; SN8636047793; 52°07′00″N 3°39′40″W	19 January 2001	Church	Located in an exceptional setting in the Irfon valley just above the confluence with the Nant Lletgwial. Set in a large circular churchyard with many monuments.	24525	See more images
Cnewr and attached buildings	Cray; SN8904622084; 51°53′11″N 3°36′49″W	25 May 2001	House	Situated on the western side of the A4067, around 2.4 km south of Crai village.	25198	Upload Photo
Pantycolly including attached byre range	Erwood; SO0692140608; 52°03′22″N 3°21′32″W	8 March 2001	Farmhouse	Situated some 5 km southwest of Crickadarn, it is the last farm on the lane headed in the direction of the Cefn Llwydallt moorland.	25663	Upload Photo
Hafod y Garreg	Erwood; SO1076241516; 52°03′53″N 3°18′11″W	8 March 2001	House	Situated across field from Penygraig, reached by track from just north of Trericket Mill.	25674	Upload Photo
Canal Aqueduct over Afon Twrch, including weir	Ystradgynlais; SN7727009240; 51°46′06″N 3°46′48″W	12 April 2001	Aqueduct	Situated 50 m north of the Twrch Bridge between the Ystradgynlais and Ystalyfera communities, accessible by a footpath along the river from Gurnos Road.	25953	Canal Aqueduct over Afon Twrch, including weir
Walls enclosing Kitchen Garden including Vine House and Pineapple House	Trallong; SN9704229027; 51°57′01″N 3°29′58″W	18 January 2002	Wall	Situated some 150 m northwest of the bridge reached by winding path through rose garden.	26095	Upload Photo
Penpont Bridge including two doorways in an attached wall at its northern end.	Trallong; SN9710928827; 51°56′54″N 3°29′54″W	17 January 1963	Bridge	Crosses River Usk to northwest of the house at Penpont.	26097	Upload Photo
Cwm y Dwrgi	Cadfarch; SN7730195817; 52°32′47″N 3°48′39″W	8 July 2002	House	Located about 6 km southeast of Machynlleth, Cwm y Dwrgi can be accessed via a minor road running south from Forge.	26837	Upload Photo
Dolobran Hall	Llangyniew; SJ1184912275; 52°42′03″N 3°18′21″W	19 September 2002	Hall	Located 1 km west of Pontrobert village, Dolobran Hall is accessible by taking a lane north towards Mathrafal Road. Northwest of the hall is a farmyard that includes another listed building, with a garden located south of the hall.	26960	Upload Photo
Parish Church of St Wddyn, Llanwddyn	Llanwddyn; SJ0227419285; 52°45′44″N 3°26′59″W	26 February 2003	Church	300 m east of the Vyrnwy Dam, in a grassed churchyard in which there are apparently no burials; iron railings and gates.	80932	See more images
Church of Saint David, Honddu Isaf	Honddu Isaf; SO0456633516; 51°59′31″N 3°23′29″W	21 July 2003	Church	In large churchyard at junction of minor roads at Garthbrengy.	81038	See more images
Llwyn-onn, Tanat Valley	Llangynog; SJ0722926274; 52°49′34″N 3°22′42″W	3 April 1974	House	About 2 km east of the village of Llangynog and north of the Afon Tanat. The upper part of the house is sunk in a hollow and the lower part of the house is built on a raised platform.	81051	Upload Photo
Church of St Anno, Llanbadarn Fynydd	Llananno, Llanbadarn Fynydd; SO0956874345; 52°21′35″N 3°19′46″W	29 July 2004	Church	In a churchyard set down on the western side of the A483 on the southwestern side of the entrance to Glanrafon Farm.	82991	See more images
Church of St Dyfrig, Glantwymyn	Glantwymyn; SH7866003528; 52°36′57″N 3°47′37″W	8 May 2004	Church	Prominently sited in a raised circular churchyard on the northwest side of the village.	83006	Upload Photo
Esgair Llewelyn	Glantwymyn; SH8000508876; 52°39′51″N 3°46′33″W	8 May 2004	House	Located in an upland position in a clearing in the Dyfi Forest and reached by lanes and tracks running north from the B4404 at Mathafarn.	83013	Upload Photo
Tan y ffordd	Glantwymyn; SH8361905955; 52°38′20″N 3°43′17″W	19 December 1951	House	Located at the end of a short track off the western side of the road, close to the River Dovey.	83044	Upload Photo
Cruck-framed farm-building at Ystum Colwyn	Meifod; SJ1898416337; 52°44′19″N 3°12′05″W	19 August 2004	Farm building	Ystum Colwyn. Farm is at the eastern angle of the junction of the A490 and the A495 northeast of Meifod. The cruck-framed farm buildings bound the southwest side of the farmyard, southeast of the house.	83068	Upload Photo
The Hall	Abbeycwmhir; SO0547471261; 52°19′53″N 3°23′19″W	9 March 2004	Country House	In its own grounds on an elevated site above the Abbey ruins and to the eastern side of the parish church.	83105	See more images
Doldowlod House	Llanyre; SN9980262492; 52°15′05″N 3°28′09″W	15 November 2004	House	It is located on the western side of the A470, approximately 6 km south-southeast of Rhayader. It sits in its own grounds on the eastern bank of the River Wye.	83227	Upload Photo
Church of Saint Maelog, Honddu Isaf	Llandyfaelog Fach, Honddu Isaf; SO0339832387; 51°58′54″N 3°24′29″W	16 February 2005	Church	In a prominent position in the centre of Llandyfaelog Fach between the B4520 and the Afon Honddu.	83673	See more images
Glan-Honddu	Honddu Isaf; SO0304131957; 51°58′39″N 3°24′47″W	16 February 2005	House	On the southern side of Llandyfaelog Fach at the end of a drive west off the B4520.	83677	Upload Photo
Y Gribyn	Trefeglwys; SN9270391666; 52°30′44″N 3°34′57″W	18 February 2005	House	Located 0.8 km from Llawr y Glyn, Y Gribyn is accessible via a lane headed southeast and downhill from the village.	83707	Upload Photo
Doldowlod House	Nantmel; SN9981162488; 52°15′05″N 3°28′09″W	15 November 2004	House	In its own grounds on the east bank of the River Wye and the west side of the A470, approximately 6 km south-southeast of Rhayader.	84148	Doldowlod House
Church of Saint Cadmarch, Llangammarch	Llangammarch Wells; SN9351647325; 52°06′50″N 3°33′23″W	29 April 2005	Church	Situated on rocky spur between Irfon and Cammarch rivers, northwest of the railway.	84374	See more images
Primary House at Rhos Fawr Isaf	Meifod; SJ1359014741; 52°43′24″N 3°16′51″W	18 May 2005	Farmhouse	In the hills that run between the Vyrnwy and Cwm Nant y Meichiad, some 2.5 km northwest of Meifod. The building is located downhill, occupying a prominent rock spur to the southeast of the later farmhouse.	84403	Upload Photo
Dam at the Upper Neuadd Reservoir	Llanfrynach; SO0291518769; 51°51′33″N 3°24′40″W	28 July 2005	Dam	Situated in the Taf Fechan valley some 9.6 km southwest of Llanfrynach.	84824	Dam at the Upper Neuadd Reservoir
6, Glamorgan Street	Brecon; SO0455028450; 51°56′47″N 3°23′24″W	16 January 1952	House	The first houses to the west of Brecknock Museum.	85694	Upload Photo
2, Buckingham Place	Brecon; SO0441228487; 51°56′48″N 3°23′32″W	16 January 1952	House	16th-century townhouse, central property of a group forming the southwestern corner as Glamorgan Street turns north to become Wheat Street.	85742	2, Buckingham Place
3, Buckingham Place	Brecon; SO0442328479; 51°56′48″N 3°23′31″W	16 January 1952	House	16th-century townhouse, part of a group forming the southwest corner as Glamorgan Street turns north to become Wheat Street.	85745	3, Buckingham Place
Morgannwg House, including Forecourt Wall and Railings	Brecon; SO0449028454; 51°56′47″N 3°23′28″W	16 January 1952	House	On the southern side of the street, to the east of Havard House (Ursuline Convent).	85751	Morgannwg House, including Forecourt Wall and Railings

== See also ==
- Grade I listed buildings in Powys
- Scheduled monuments in Powys
- Registered historic parks and gardens in Powys
