= Crickhowell Rural District =

Former rural district in Brecknockshire, Wales

Coordinates: 51.85837°N 3.13670°W

Crickhowell
- Rural district
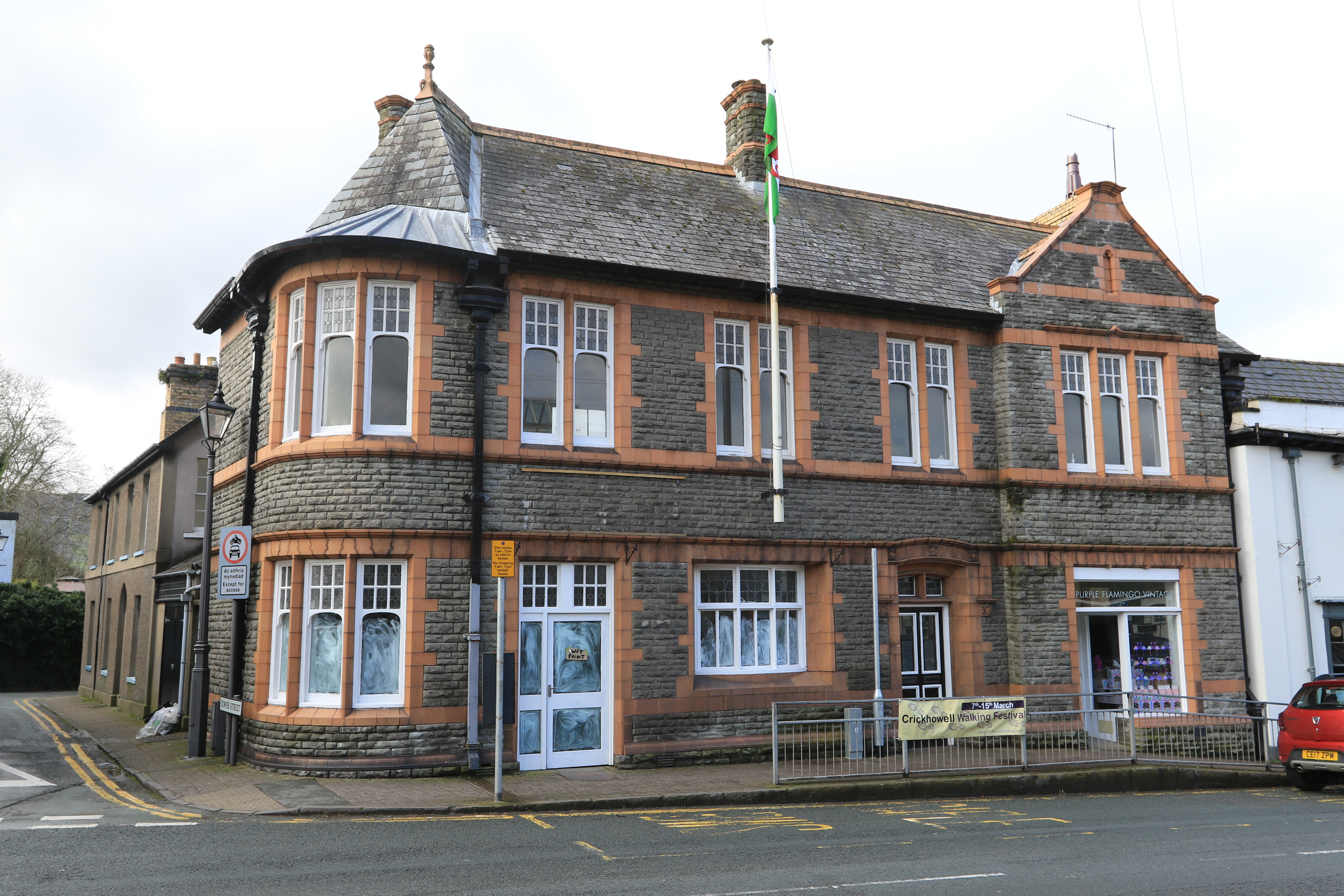
- Council's headquarters, Beaufort Chambers, Crickhowell
- Area
  - 1971: 18,669 hectares (46,130 acres)
- Population
  - 1901: 7,115
  - 1971: 8,010
- History
  - Created: 28 December 1894
  - Abolished: 31 March 1974
  - Succeeded by: Brecknock
- Status: Rural district
  - HQ: Crickhowell

Crickhowell Rural District was a rural district in Brecknockshire (or Breconshire), Wales from 1894 to 1974, covering an area in the south-east of the county around the small town of Crickhowell.

== Origins ==
The district had its origins in the Crickhowell poor law union, which had been created in 1836, covering Crickhowell itself and several surrounding parishes. In 1872 sanitary districts were established, giving public health and local government responsibilities for rural areas to the existing boards of guardians of poor law unions. Areas with existing urban authorities were excluded from the rural sanitary district, which covered the rest of the poor law union. Parts of the urban local government districts of Brynmawr, Ebbw Vale, Rhymney and Tredegar fell within the Crickhowell poor law union, and were therefore excluded from the Crickhowell rural sanitary district.

The town of Crickhowell itself had no urban authority, and so it was administered as part of the rural sanitary district. The rural sanitary district was administered from Crickhowell Union Workhouse, which had been completed in 1872 (on the site of an earlier workhouse) at the hamlet of Dardy in the parish of Llangattock, about a mile west of Crickhowell itself.

Under the Local Government Act 1894, rural sanitary districts became rural districts from 28 December 1894 with their own elected councils. Crickhowell Rural District Council held its first meeting on 31 December 1894 at the workhouse. The first chairman was Joseph Bailey, a former Conservative MP who had also been the chairman of the Crickhowell Board of Guardians for some years previously.

== Civil parishes ==
The parishes within the district were:

- Crickhowell
- Grwyne Fawr (absorbed into Partrishow 1934)
- Grwyne Fechan (absorbed into Llanbedr Ystradwy 1934)
- Llanbedr Ystradwy
- Llanelly
- Llanfihangel Cwmdu
- Llangattock
- Llangenny
- Llangynidr
- Partrishow

== Premises ==
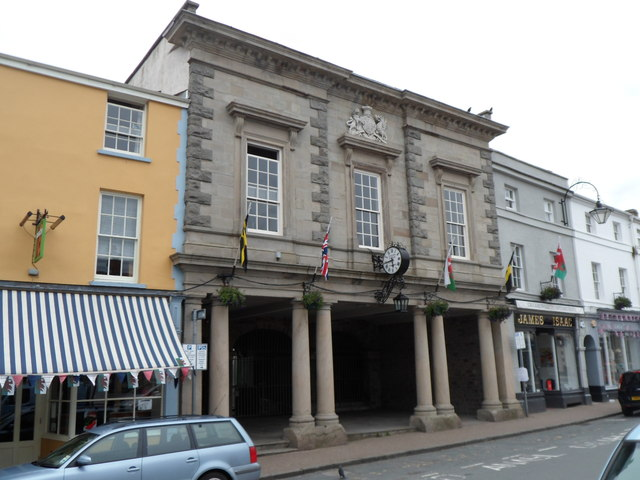
Crickhowell Town Hall: Council's meeting place 1900–1930

The council initially met at the workhouse, but in 1900 moved its meetings to Crickhowell Town Hall.

A new office building called Beaufort Chambers was built on Beaufort Street in 1906. The rural district council initially took a small suite of offices there for some of its staff, but later expanded to take over the whole building. Council meetings transferred from the Town Hall to a new council chamber at Beaufort Chambers in 1930, and the council bought the building in 1936.

== Abolition ==
Crickhowell Rural District was abolished in 1974 under the Local Government Act 1972, with the area becoming part of the Borough of Brecknock in the new county of Powys, with the exception of the parish of Llanelly, which was transferred to Blaenau Gwent.
