= Crickhowell Market Hall =

Municipal Building in Crickhowell, Wales

- Neuadd y Farchnad Crucywel (Welsh)
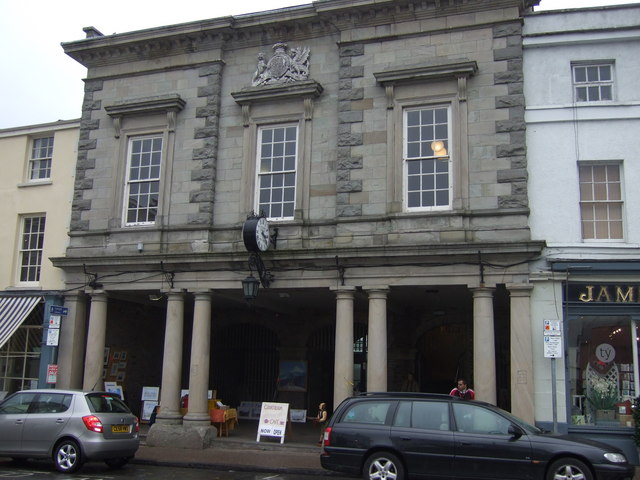
- Crickhowell Market Hall

- Shown in Powys
- 51.8589°N 3.1375°W
- Location: High Street, Crickhowell

History
- Built: 1834

Site notes
- Architect: Thomas Henry Wyatt
- Architectural style: Renaissance style

Listed Building – Grade II*
- Official name: Town Hall
- Designated: 9 May 1983
- Reference no.: 7211

Crickhowell Market Hall (Welsh: Neuadd y Farchnad Crucywel), formerly Crickhowell Town Hall (Welsh: Neuadd y Dref Crucywel), is a municipal building in the High Street, Crickhowell, Powys, Wales. The structure, which accommodates market stalls on the ground floor and a café on the first floor, is a Grade II* listed building.

== History ==
The first municipal building in the town was a market hall in the centre of the High Street which was completed in the 17th century. After the original building became dilapidated, it was demolished and later replaced by a memorial fountain dedicated to a local medical doctor, Henry John Lucas of Aberystwyth. In the early 1830s, the lord of the manor, Henry Somerset, 6th Duke of Beaufort, whose seat was at Raglan Castle, decided to commission a new building; the site he selected was on the west side of the High Street, a short distance to the west of the site of the original building. The new building was designed in the Renaissance style by Thomas Henry Wyatt, who was a nephew of the duke's agent, built in ashlar stone and was completed in 1834.

The design involved a symmetrical main frontage with three bays facing onto the High Street. On the ground floor, there was a tetrastyle portico created by pairs of Doric order columns in antis. On the first floor, the central bay, which was slightly recessed, was fenestrated by a sash window with an architrave and a bracketed cornice, surmounted by a carving of the Beaufort coat of arms and a modillioned cornice. The outer bays were fenestrated by sash windows in the same style, surmounted by entablatures and modillioned cornices, and flanked by rubble masonry quoins. Internally, the principal rooms were the market hall on the ground floor and a courtroom on the first floor.

The building served primarily as a courthouse. The manor which covered the town was called the 'borough of Crickhowell', but it was never given a charter and it appears that no borough council ever operated. Any residual claim Crickhowell may have had to be called a borough was extinguished under the Municipal Corporations Act 1883.

From 1894, the town was part of the Crickhowell Rural District. The rural district council initially met at the workhouse in Llangattock, but in 1900 moved its meetings to the building, which by then was known as the town hall. A new office building called Beaufort Chambers was built on Beaufort Street in 1906; the rural district council initially took a small suite of offices there for some of its staff, but later expanded to take over the whole building. Council meetings transferred from the town hall to a new council chamber at Beaufort Chambers in 1930.

The courtroom on the first floor of the town hall continued to be used for magistrates court hearings, as well as for child welfare surgeries. A new projecting clock was installed on the front of the building to celebrate the Golden Jubilee of Elizabeth II in 2002. The courtroom on the first floor was adapted for retail use and operated as the Cheese Press Café until it closed in 2006.

In 2007, Powys County Council offered a 99-year leasehold interest in the building to a newly-formed charity, the Market Hall Trust, at a subsidised rent. The building was subsequently refurbished by the charity and the room on the first floor re-opened as the Courtroom Café in 2008.

== See also ==
- Grade II* listed buildings in Powys
