= Upper House, the Malt House and Little Malt House =

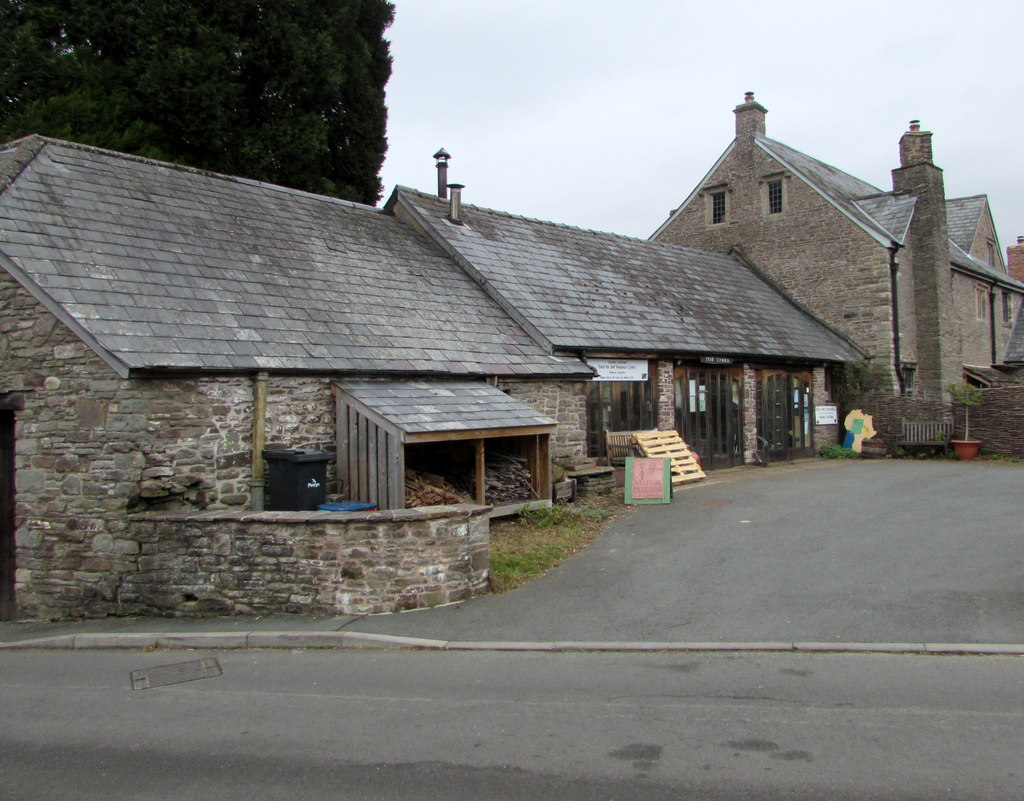
- Upper House is at the right of the image, with the Malthouse, Little Malt House, granary and gazebo out of shot behind

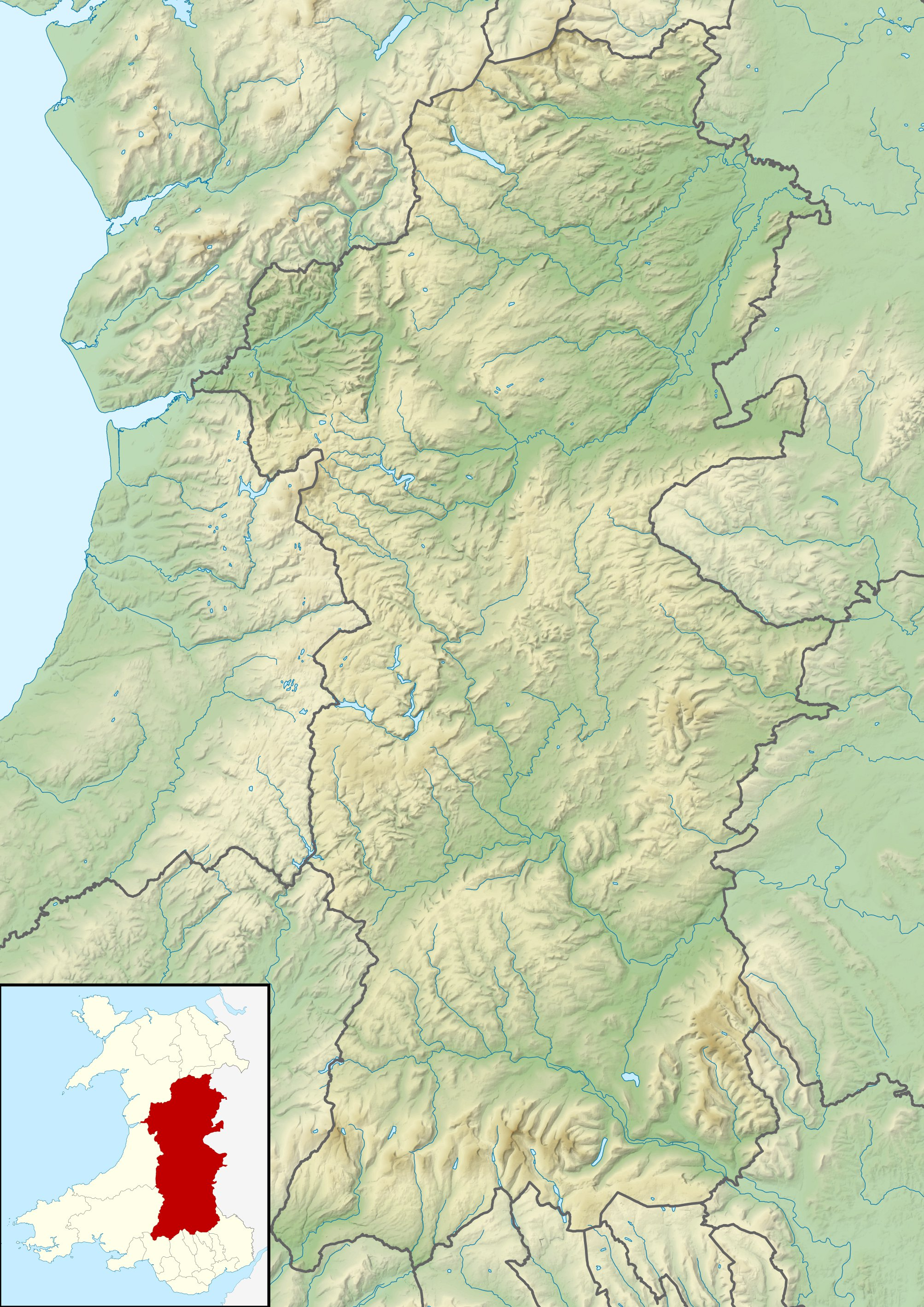
- Location within Powys
- 51.8596°N 3.1354°W
- Type: House
- Location: Crickhowell, Powys

History
- Built: 17th/18th centuries

Site notes
- Architectural style: Vernacular
- Governing body: Privately owned

Listed Building – Grade II*
- Official name: Upper House
- Designated: 19 July 1963
- Reference no.: 7251

Listed Building – Grade II*
- Official name: The Malt House
- Designated: 19 July 1963
- Reference no.: 7248

Listed Building – Grade II*
- Official name: Little Malt House
- Designated: 19 July 1963
- Reference no.: 7250

Listed Building – Grade II*
- Official name: Former Granary to the Malt House
- Designated: 19 July 1963
- Reference no.: 7247

Listed Building – Grade II*
- Official name: Gazebo at The Malthouse
- Designated: 25 September 1986
- Reference no.: 7249

Listed Building – Grade II
- Official name: Pigsty at Upper House
- Designated: 25 September 1986
- Reference no.: 7252

Upper House, the Malt House and Little Malt House, form three elements of a former large mansion, Rumsey Place, on Standard Street, Crickhowell, Powys, Wales. They date from the 17th and early 18th centuries. All three buildings, a granary, and a gazebo which stands on the garden of the Malt House, have Grade II* historic listings. A further granary and a pigsty are listed at Grade II.

== History and description ==
The Powys edition of the Pevsner The Buildings of Wales series dates the former mansion, Rumsey Place, to 1609. Cadw suggests earlier, 16th-century, origins for the complex. The Rumsey family were prosperous maltsters and brewers who, as their wealth grew, developed the complex as their Crickhowell townhouse. The house was built to a traditional hall H-plan, with a courtyard of ancillary commercial and agricultural buildings. In the 19th century, the mansion was subdivided, although remaining in the hands of the Rumsey family. Upper House formed the eastern wing, the Malt House the western wing, and the Little Malt House was formed later, in the 1920s, from the cross passage between the two.

The granary forms the western wing of the courtyard, and dates from the early 18th century. The pigsty and another granary stand to the east of Upper House. A gazebo in the garden of the Malt House also dates from the 18th century. The Royal Commission on the Ancient and Historical Monuments of Wales (RCAHMW) notes the building as being square with a pyramid roof. RCAHMW also records the interior of Upper House as containing remnants of Tudor decoration, including a fireplace and wall paintings.

Upper House, the Malt House, Little Malt House, and the granary and the gazebo at the Malt House, are Grade II* listed buildings, while the Upper House granary and pigsty are listed at Grade II.

== Sources ==
- Scourfield, Robert; Haslam, Richard (2013). Powys: Montgomeryshire, Radnorshire and Breconshire. The Buildings of Wales. New Haven, US and London: Yale University Press. ISBN 9780300185089.
