= Trewern Hall =

- Location in Montgomeryshire
- 52.6951°N 3.0831°W
- Location: Trewern, Montgomeryshire, Wales
- OS grid reference: SO326807311409

History
- Built: 15th Century and 1610
- Built for: Francis Family

Site notes
- Architect: M. J. Garner
- Architectural style: Timber framed Severn Valley House
- Restored: 1985-6 (SW end) and 1993-4 (NE end)
- Restored by: Murray.Ll. Chapman

Listed Building – Grade II*
- Designated: 25 April 1950
- Reference no.: 7920

Trewern Hall or Trewern Farmhouse is a country house in Montgomeryshire, Wales, close to the Shropshire border. It is on a spur in the floodplain of the River Severn, in the Trewern community area of what is now Powys, to the north of the A458 road from Shrewsbury to Welshpool. It is a fine example of a Severn valley half-timbered house. The Grade II* listed hall was occupied by the Lloyd, Francis and Whittaker families. In 1985–86 (SW end) and 1993–94 (NE end) it was extensively restored with some remodelling by the architect M. J. Garner for Murray Ll. Chapman.

== Architecture ==
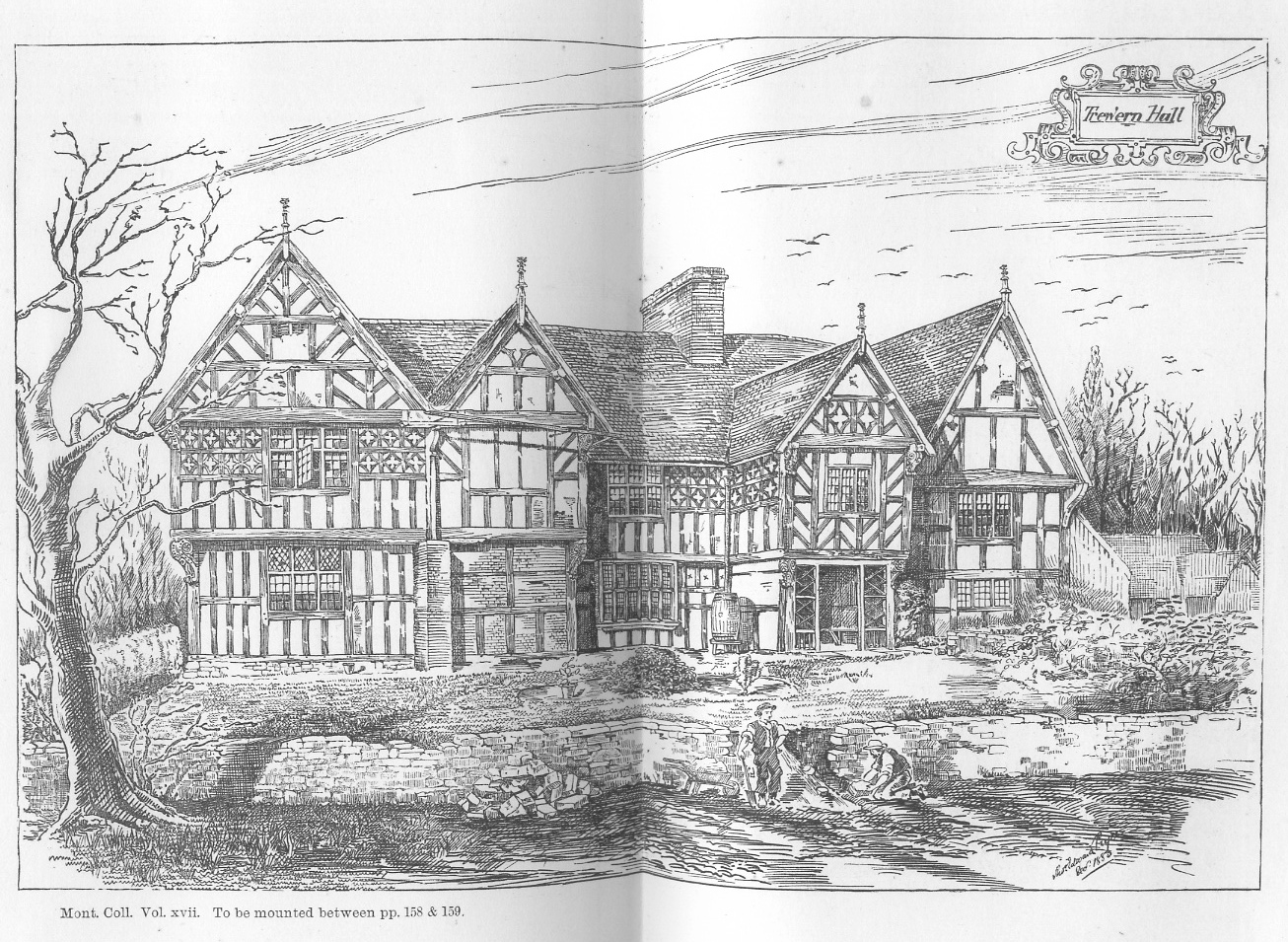
Trewern Hall or Trewern Farmhouse, Montgomeryshire 1884

The earliest depiction of Trewern Hall is a print of the house by Thomas Edward Pryce, who visited the house in December 1883. In his description of the house he notes that the porch was "badly mutilated" and that inside and all decorative features had been removed. The date 1610 and the initials R F also occur on a tie beam in the plainer kitchen wing to the east. The front of the house is nearly symmetrical with two outer gables with a hall between, the latter flanked by two-storeyed gabled wings. To the right is a porch with a lobby entrance to the hall and access to the kitchen wing. The main hall of the house had small square windows divided by moulded mullions at a high level in the room to an oriel window. In the exterior, the 17th-century timber framing consists of two upper courses of decorative quadrants, and a herringbone pattern. The house is also jettied on three sides on corbels, carved with figures and heads on the front.

== Literature ==
- Chapman, M. Ll. (1988), Trewern Hall, its owners and occupiers Montgomery Collections : 76 : 31–106. (with reconstructed plan of 1610 and 1910).
- Chapman, M. Ll. (2008), The Family of Roger Francis of Trewern Hall, The Montgomeryshire Collections : 96 : 3–59
- Pryce, T. E. (1884), Half timber houses of Montgomeryshire, The Montgomeryshire Collections : 17 : 149–64.
- Royal Commission on the Ancient and Historical Monuments of Wales (1911), Inventory of the Ancient Monuments in Wales and Monmouth I – County of Montgomery.
- Scourfield R. and Haslam R. (2013), The Buildings of Wales: Powys; Montgomeryshire, Radnorshire and Breconshire, Yale University Press. pp. 262–3.
- Smith P. (1988, 2nd ed.), Houses of the Welsh Countryside, H.M.S.O.

== See also ==
Other Montgomeryshire timber-framed houses:

- Great Cefnyberen
- Ty Mawr, Castle Caereinion
- Cilthriew, Kerry
- Maesmawr Hall, Llandinam
- Glas Hirfryn, Llansilin
- Lymore, Montgomery
