= Crickhowell =

Town in Wales

Crickhowell: Welsh: Crucywel
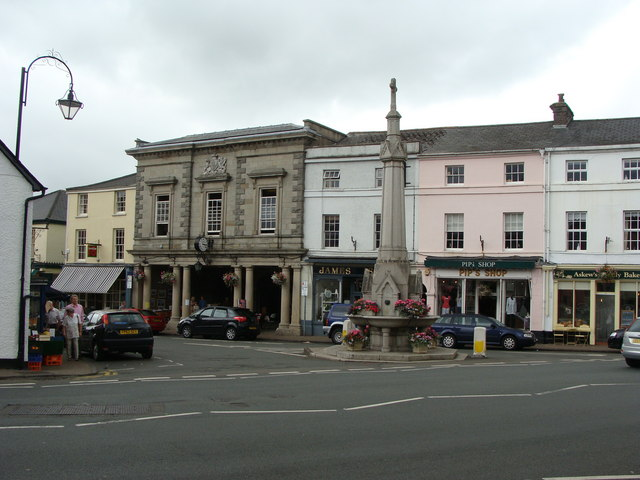
- Crickhowell Market Hall and the Lucas Memorial Fountain

- Location within Powys
- Population: 2,063 (2011)
- OS grid reference: SO217186
- Principal area: Powys
- Preserved county: Powys
- Country: Wales
- Sovereign state: United Kingdom
- Post town: CRICKHOWELL
- Postcode district: NP8
- Dialling code: 01873
- Police: Dyfed-Powys
- Fire: Mid and West Wales
- Ambulance: Welsh
- UK Parliament: Brecon, Radnor and Cwm Tawe
- Senedd Cymru – Welsh Parliament: Brecon and Radnorshire
- List of places UK Wales Powys 51.8597°N 3.1372°W Community map: Map of the community

Crickhowell (/krɪkˈhaʊəl/; Welsh: Crucywel pronounced [krɨkːəu̯ɛl], non-standard spelling Crughywel) is a town and community in southeastern Powys, Wales, near Abergavenny, and was historically in the county of Brecknockshire.

== Location ==
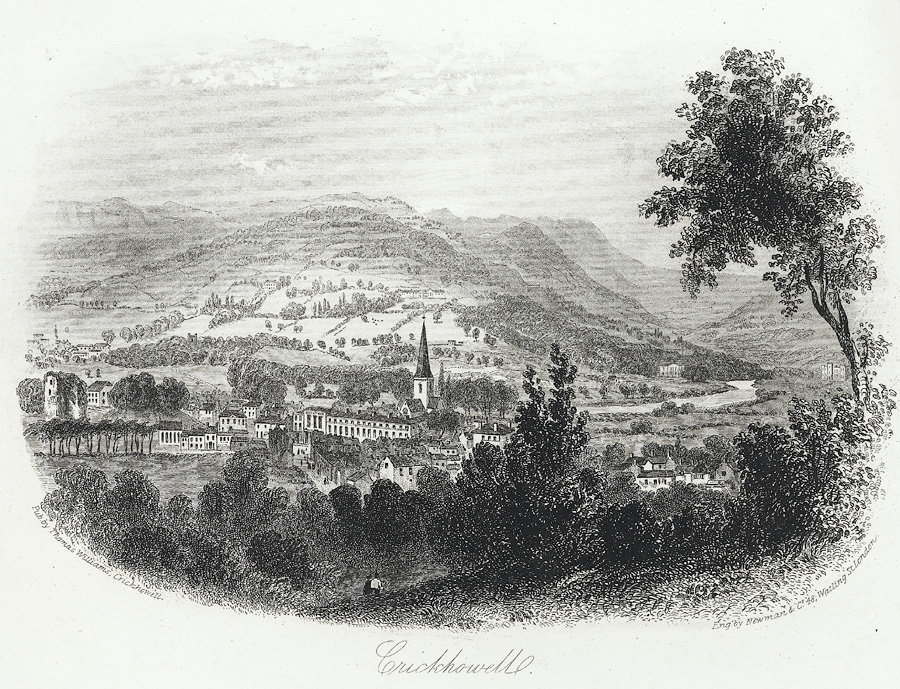
General view of the town, c. 1860

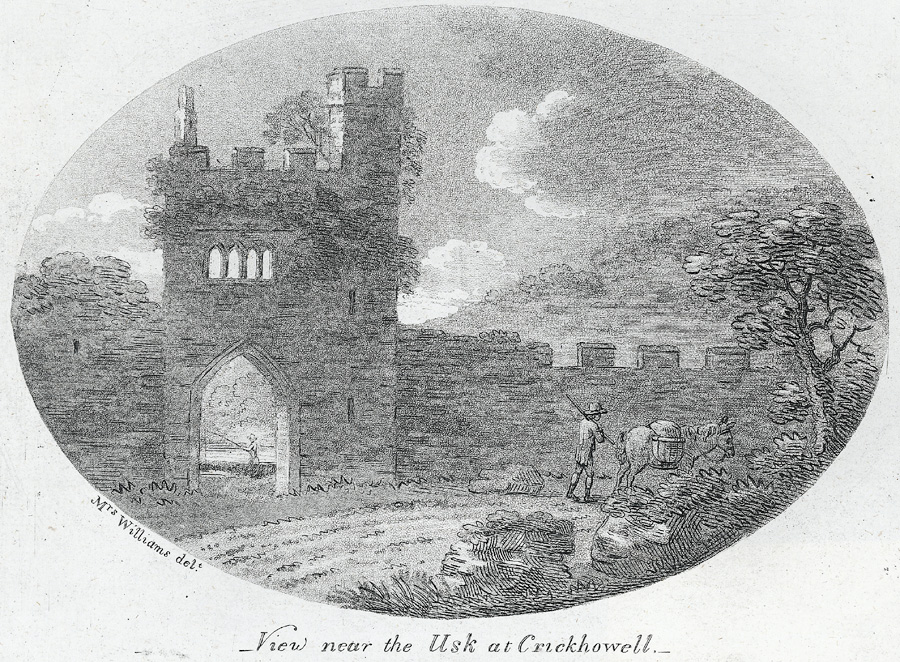
Porthmawr Gate c. 1800

The town lies on the River Usk, on the southern edge of the Black Mountains and in the eastern part of the Brecon Beacons National Park. Significant parts of the surrounding countryside, over 20,000 acres (81 km^{2}), form part of the Glanusk Park estate.

== Toponymy and language ==
The name Crickhowell is an anglicised spelling that corresponds to the Welsh Crucywel. The name is derived from Crug Hywel, meaning 'Hywel's mound'. This is usually identified with the Iron Age hill fort on nearby Table Mountain, although this has the local name of Mynydd y Begwn. It may be that Crug Hywel refers to the castle mound in the town itself. The language of Crickhowell (and Llangynidr) was originally Welsh. In his 1893 book Wales and her language, John E. Southall reports that over 60% of the population of Crickhowell spoke Welsh, although the town was only a few miles from more anglicised Abergavenny.

In a 1966 letter, the English author J. R. R. Tolkien wrote that the name Crickhowell was the inspiration for the name of the fictional town of Crickhollow, in Tolkien's fantasy novel trilogy The Lord of the Rings.

== The town ==
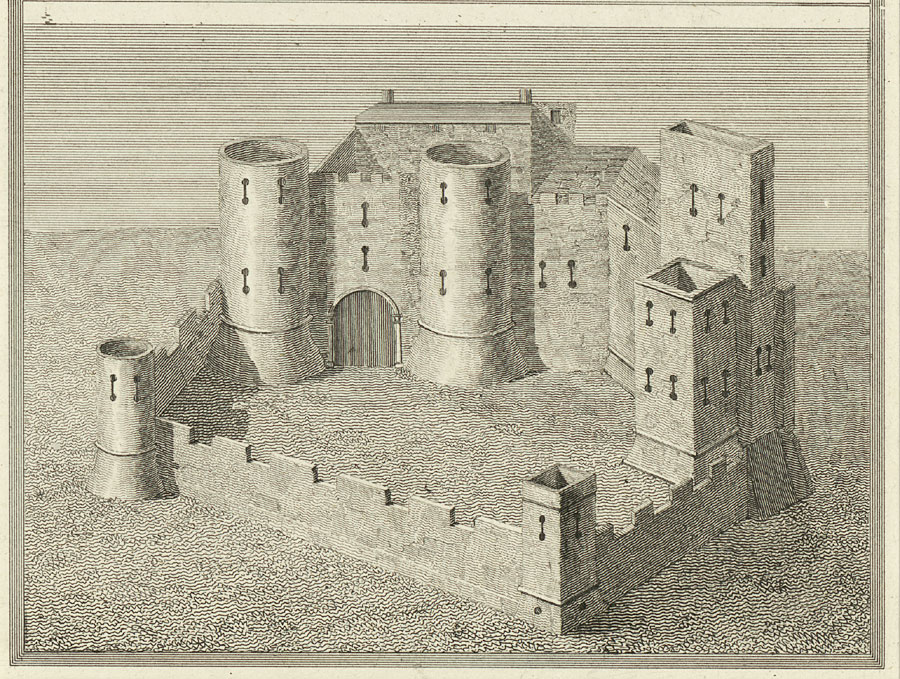
Crickhowell Castle. Engraving of Crickhowell Castle (1805) by James Basire

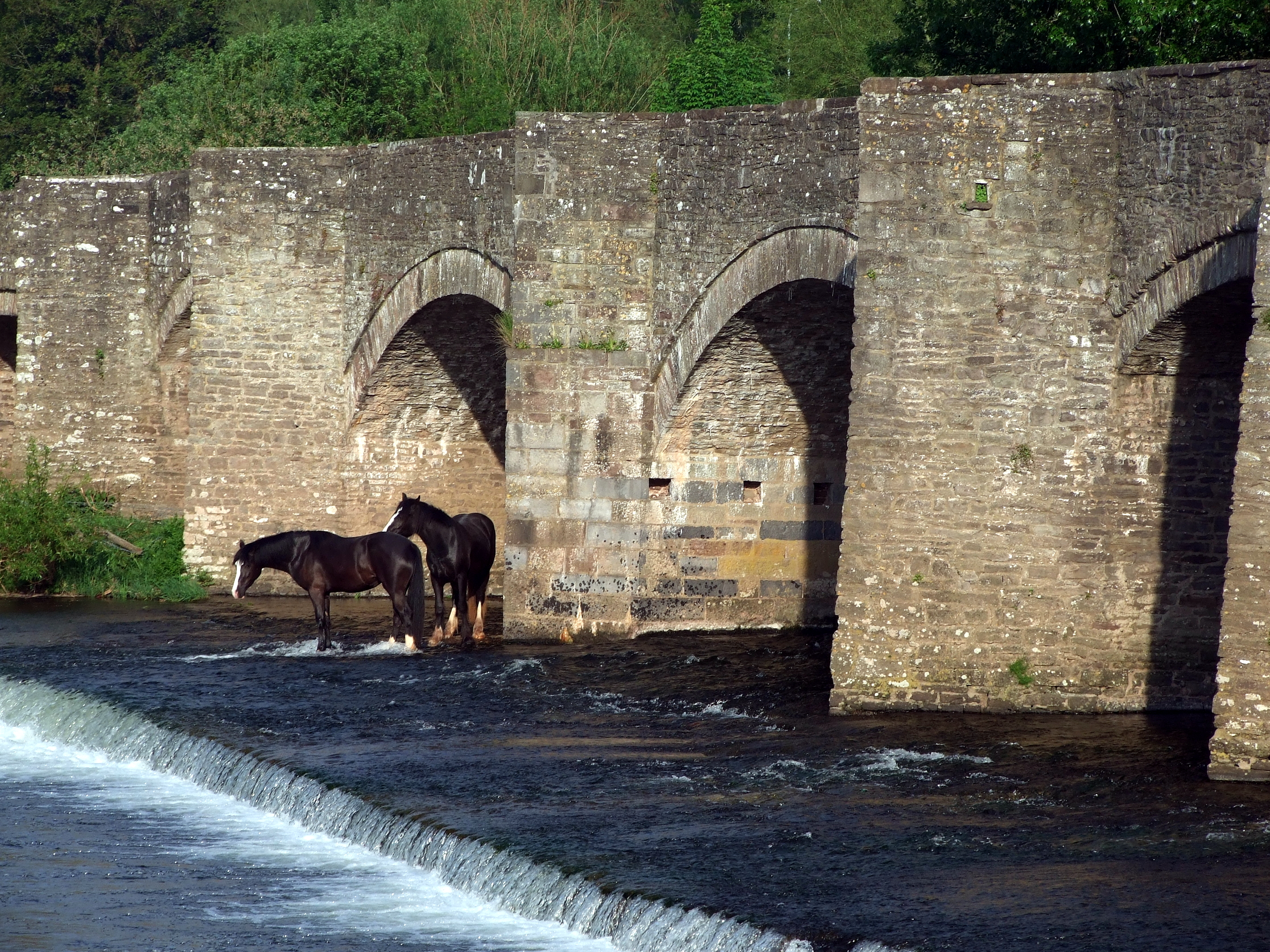
Detail of Crickhowell Bridge

There is a primary school and a secondary school; both act as a central point for a large catchment area. There is some light industry on the outskirts of Crickhowell at the Elvicta Industrial Estate. The town centre includes a variety of traditional businesses, many of which are family owned. Other facilities in Crickhowell include a library, two play areas, public toilets and the CRiC building, which houses a tourist information centre, an internet cafe, an art gallery and a local history archive. There are pubs, cafes, restaurants and two hotels: "The Bear" and "The Dragon".

The churches in Crickhowell include St Edmund's Church which holds a service every Sunday, Crickhowell Evangelical Church, a Baptist church and a Catholic church.

In 2015, Crickhowell appeared in a TV documentary, claiming it as the first British settlement to purposely use similar tax avoidance tactics used by multinational businesses to avoid paying taxes themselves, in protest at the way large corporations use legal loopholes to avoid paying UK corporation tax.

A market and fair have been recorded since 1281.

== Governance ==
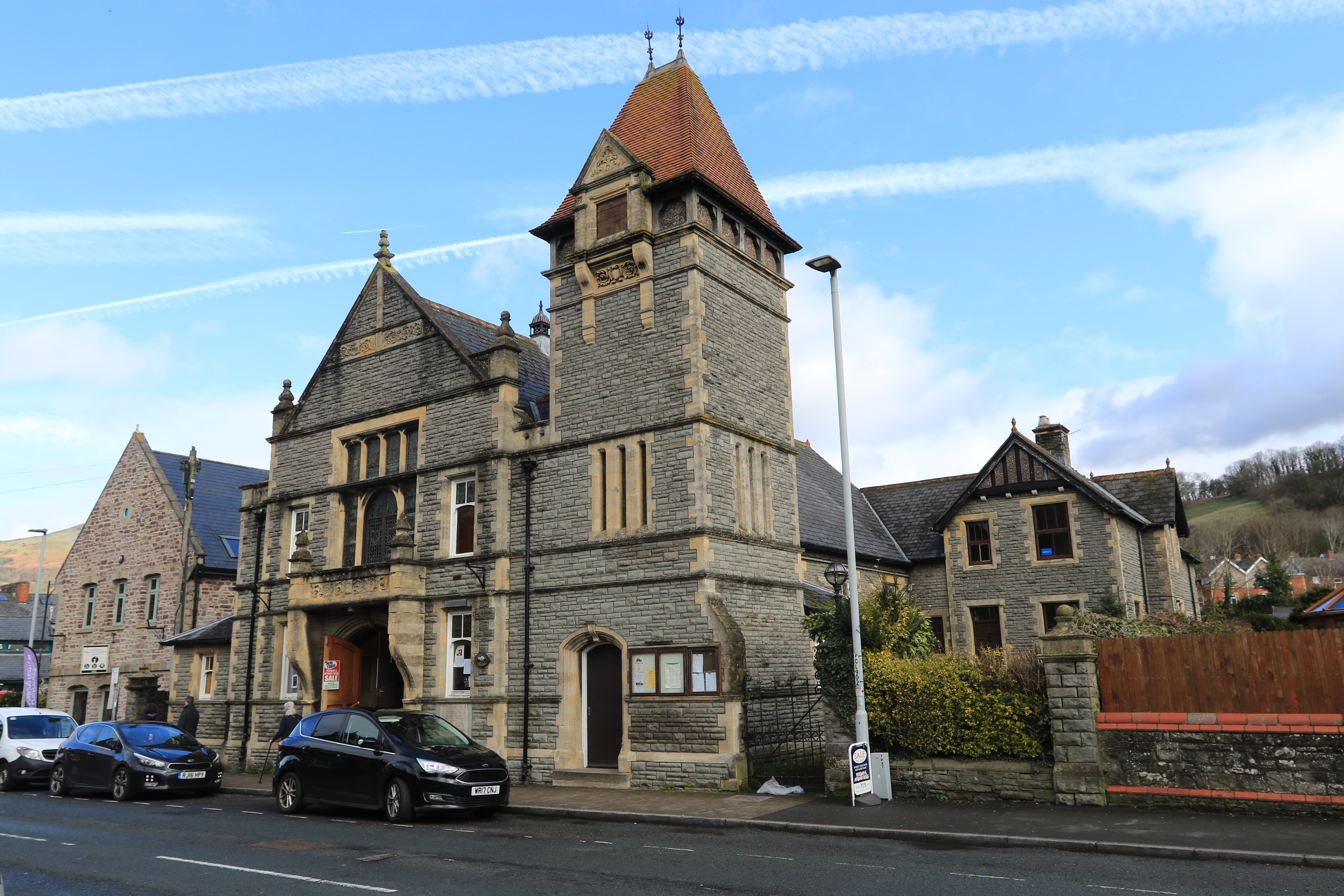
Clarence Hall: Main building (centre) is events venue, with Clarence House (town council offices) to right and Crickhowell Resource and Information Centre to left

There are two tiers of local government covering Crickhowell, at community (town) and county level: Crickhowell Town Council and Powys County Council. Planning matters fall to the Brecon Beacons National Park Authority. The town council meets at the Crickhowell Resource and Information Centre on Beaufort Street and has its offices in the adjoining Clarence House (part of the Clarence Hall complex).

=== Administrative history ===
Crickhowell was an ancient parish in the Crickhowell (or Crucywel) hundred of Brecknockshire. The manor which covered the town was called the 'borough of Crickhowell', but it was never given a charter and it appears that no borough council ever operated. Any residual claim Crickhowell may have had to be called a borough was extinguished under the Municipal Corporations Act 1883.

When elected parish and district councils were introduced in 1894, Crickhowell was given a parish council and included in the Crickhowell Rural District. The rural district was abolished in 1974, after which Crickhowell was included in the Borough of Brecknock in the new county of Powys; the borough in turn was abolished in 1996 and its functions passed to Powys County Council. The parish of Crickhowell was redesignated as a community in 1974; its community council took the name Crickhowell Town Council.

== Tourism ==
Today, Crickhowell is a popular tourist destination. In 2005 a tourist information centre was built in the centre of town and during summer the town is notably busier. Many people visit Crickhowell to see the Black Mountains and the Brecon Beacons, and perhaps to enjoy some mountain-biking, camping, hillwalking, rock climbing, fly-fishing, hang-gliding or caravanning, or simply to tour the area by car, staying in bed-and-breakfast accommodation. The Green Man Festival takes place annually in mid-August at nearby Glanusk Park.

== Notable buildings ==
Notable features in Crickhowell include the seventeenth-century stone bridge over the River Usk with its odd arches (twelve on one side, thirteen on the other) and its seat built into the walls, the 14th-century parish church of St Edmund, and the ruins of Crickhowell Castle on the green "tump" set back from the A40 Brecon to Abergavenny road.

=== Market Hall ===
Crickhowell Market Hall (originally the Town Hall) on The Square dates from 1834, nowadays with market stalls on the ground floor and a cafe in the first floor old courtroom. In 2007 Powys County Council handed over responsibility of the hall to a charity, the Market Hall Trust. The stone building, raised on twin doric columns, is Grade II* listed.

== Schools ==
Crickhowell has two schools: Crickhowell Community Primary School and a secondary school, Crickhowell High School.

== Notable people ==
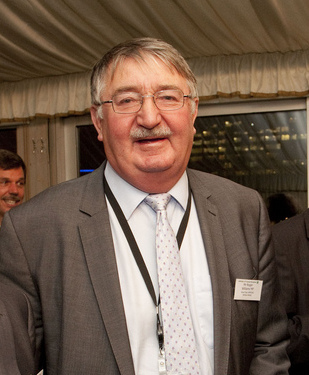
Roger Williams MP, 2011

- Watkin Herbert (ca.1517 – ca.1564), a politician and MP for Breconshire in 1558.
- Admiral John Gell (1740–1806), a commander in the Royal Navy for 30 years, died locally.
- Colonel Sir George Everest (1790–1866), eponym for Mount Everest. Surveyor and geographer, served as Surveyor General of India from 1830 to 1843. His English father had an estate nearby called "Gwernvale Manor".
- Admiral Sir Walter Cowan, 1st Baronet (1871–1956), a Royal Navy officer in both World Wars
- Nicholas Edwards, Baron Crickhowell (1934–2018), politician and MP for Pembrokeshire from 1970 until 1987 and Secretary of State for Wales
- Sir Roderic Llewellyn, 5th Baronet (born 1947), baronet, garden designer, journalist, author, and TV presenter.
- Roger Williams (born 1948), politician and MP for Brecon and Radnorshire from 2001 to 2015.
- Martyn Farr (born 1951), exploratory cave diver and caver
- Mark Wyatt (born 1957), played ten games for Wales national rugby union team
- Tiggy Legge-Bourke (born 1965), former royal nanny. Her childhood home was Glanusk Park estate. She still lives near the town as proprietor of Tŷ'r Chanter bed and breakfast lodgings.

== Golf course ==
The former Crickhowell & Penmyarth Golf Club was founded in 1897 and played on a course at Glanusk Park. The club and course disappeared in the late 1960s.

== Surrounding villages ==
- Cwmdu
- Glangrwyney
- Llanbedr
- Llangattock
- Llangenny
- Llangynidr
- Tretower— Tretower Castle and Tretower Court, a manor house still in very good condition

Cwrt y Gollen, a British Army training base, is near Crickhowell.
