= Bear Hotel, Crickhowell =

The Bear Hotel
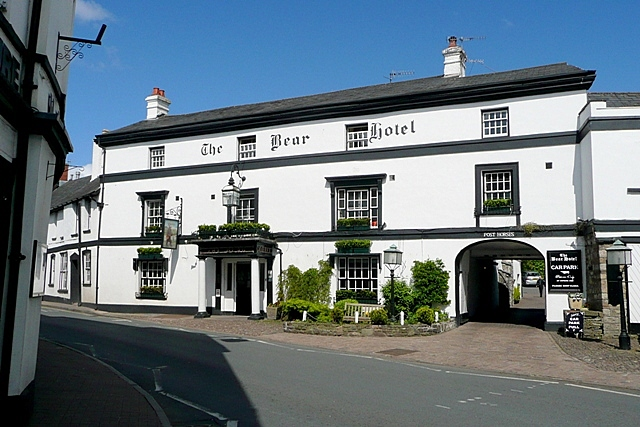
- "the epitome of a mid-to later 18th century coaching inn"

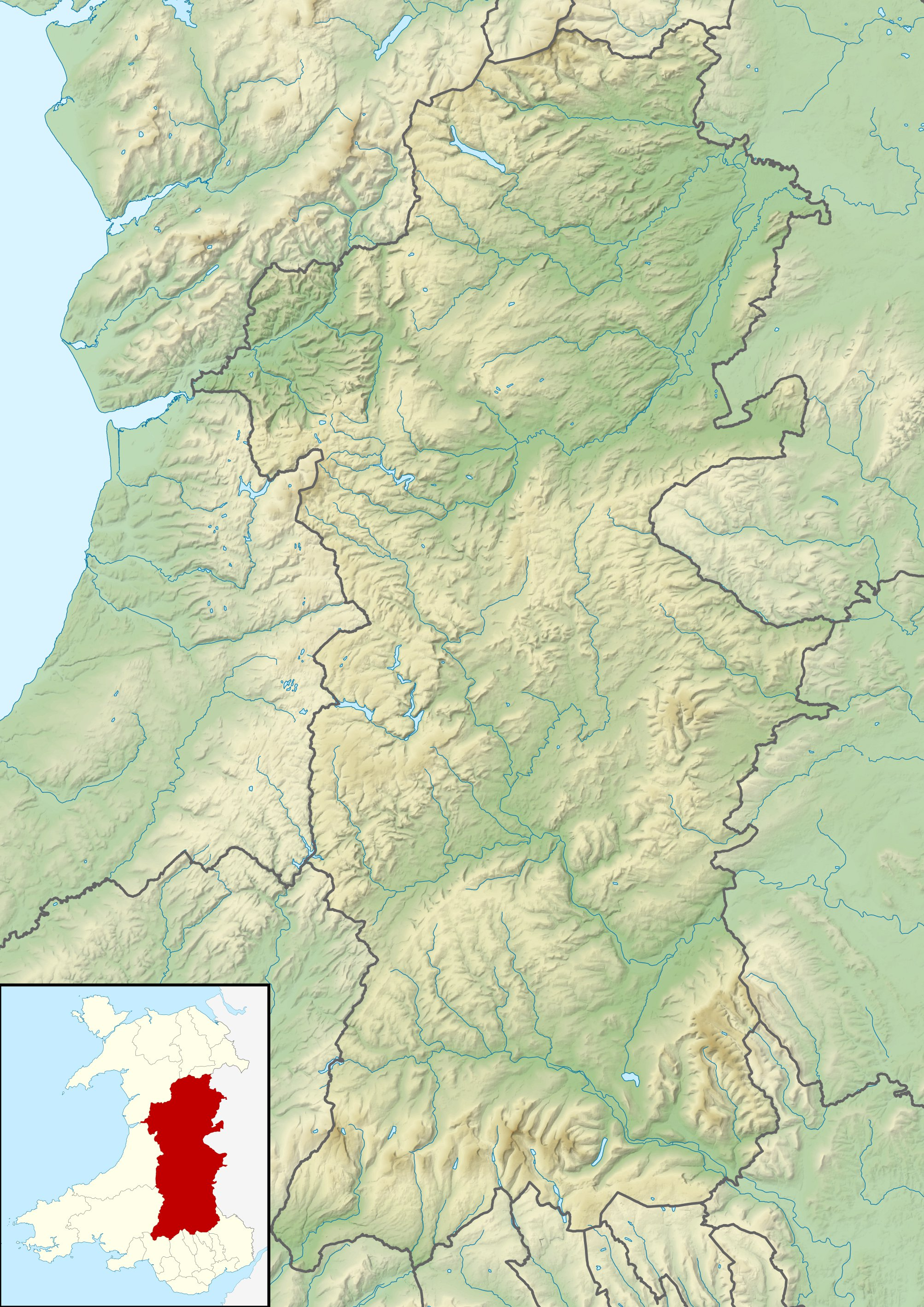
- Location within Powys
- 51.8593°N 3.137°W
- Type: Hotel
- Location: Crickhowell, Powys

History
- Built: 18th century with earlier origins

Site notes
- Architectural style: Vernacular
- Governing body: Privately owned

Listed Building – Grade II*
- Official name: The Bear Hotel
- Designated: 25 September 1986
- Reference no.: 7200

Listed Building – Grade II
- Official name: Bar to the Bear Hotel
- Designated: 25 September 1986
- Reference no.: 7201

The Bear Hotel, formerly the White Bear, stands on Beaufort Street, Crickhowell, Powys, Wales. A coaching inn from the mid 18th century, the building has older origins from the 17th and 15th centuries. It is a Grade II* listed building.

== History and description ==
The Powys edition of The Buildings of Wales describes the Bear as "the epitome of an 18th century coaching inn". It is reputed to have functioned as an inn since 1432, although Cadw attributes a certain dating only to the 17th century. In the late 19th century the inn was a local headquarters of the Cyclists' Touring Club. The Bear remains an independent hotel. In the 1990s, Robbie Williams stayed at the Bear for some months, when recording at Rockfield Studios following his split from Take That. In 2004 Johnny Depp visited while filming The Libertine at Tretower Court.

The main block of the hotel comprises three storeys with four bays, with a central porch flanked by Doric columns, and an arched carriage entrance to the right. The Bear is a Grade II* listed building, with the hotel bar having its own Grade II listing.

== Sources ==
- Scourfield, Robert; Haslam, Richard (2013). Powys: Montgomeryshire, Radnorshire and Breconshire. The Buildings of Wales. New Haven, US and London: Yale University Press. ISBN 9780300185089.
