= St Edmund's Church, Crickhowell =

Church in Powys, Wales

Coordinates: 51.8589°N 3.1392°W

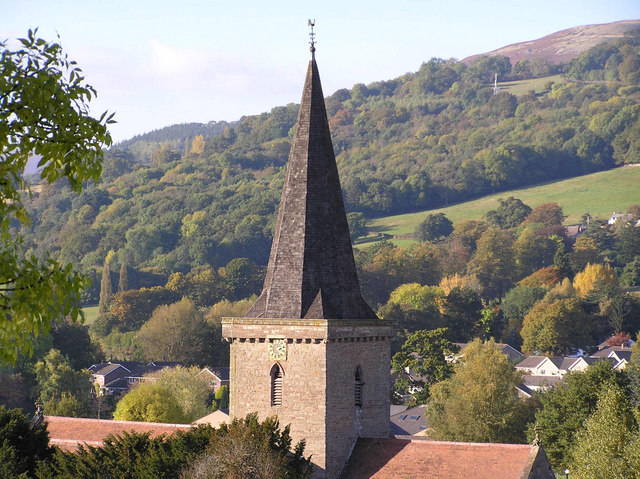
St Edmund's Church, Crickhowell

St Edmund's Church is located in Crickhowell, in southeastern Powys, Wales. Built in the early 14th century, the church is dedicated to Saint Edmund the king and martyr. It has been known by this name from its establishment in 1303. In a will dated 1576 in the register office at Brecon, it is termed the parish of Saint Edmund. It is a Grade II* listed building.

== Architecture and fittings ==
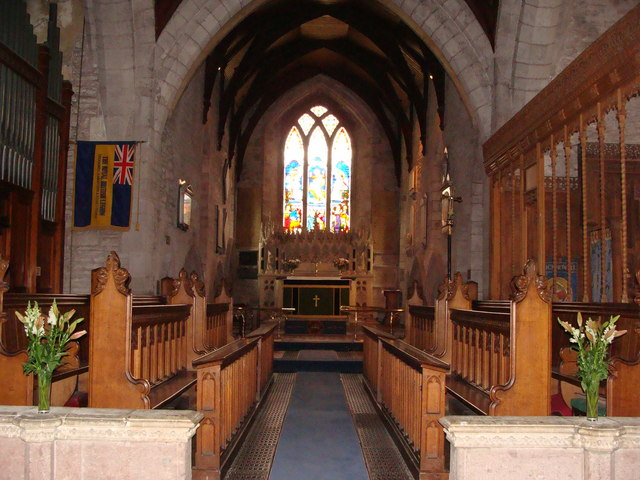
Interior

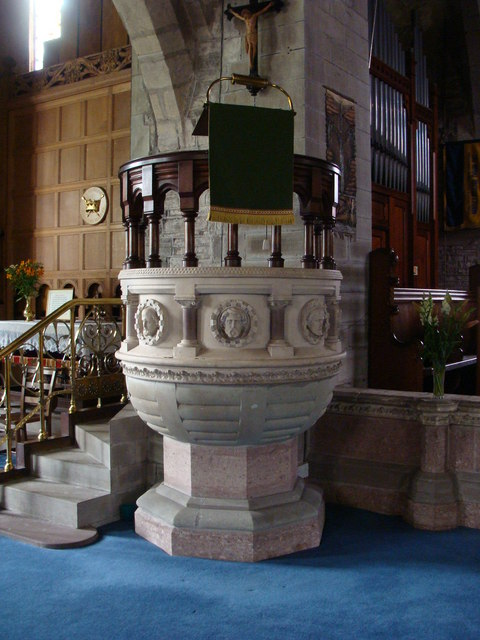
Pulpit

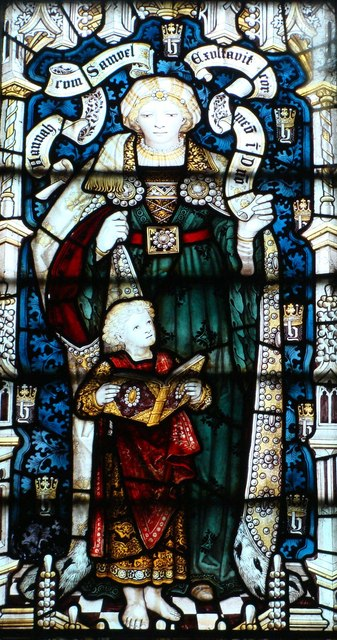
Stained glass window

The church was formerly much larger than it is at present, for having been found upon examination in a very dilapidated state, permission was obtained in 1765, to enable the churchwardens to take down the two side aisles. It is cruciform, consisting of a chancel, naive, two transepts and a shingled spire, (the only one in this county) containing five bells in the centre: the length from east to west is 112-feet 11 inches, from north to south 47 feet 8 inches, and the nave 20 feet (6.1 m) wide, but the chancel is only 17 feet (5.2 m). The rood-loft still remains, and is used as a belfry. The south transept is called the Rumsey chapel, having been formerly appendant to an estate belonging to that family. The north transept is called the Gwernvale chapel.

Improvements have deprived all distinguishing marks of antiquity, a lancet window of three lights in the west end immediately over the principal door of entrance, only excepted. The font is relatively modern, bearing the date of 1668 and the names of the wardens of that day. The side aisles, when standing had the emblems of different trading companies carved in wood. The church ceiling was of lath and plaster. It is paved and the seats are regular, but many of them are decayed and needing of repairing. The reading desk is of poor quality, and inconveniently placed, being screened by the pulpit from the greater part of the congregation.

=== Monuments ===
Under a low arch in the south wall of the chancel is a mutilated figure of a knight (formerly cross legged) in complete mail armour recumbent upon an altar monument of stone. By the arms on a shield the person interred and here commemorated was a Pauncefote or Pauncefoot. Upon the front margin or edge of the tablet on which the figure rests, is an inscription not legible. From the cross legs of figures of this kind many writers and some antiquaries of the eighteenth century were in the habit of concluding that these were the monuments of Knights Templars, or at least of crusaders, the public opinion on this has since changed. Opposite to this figure, under a similar arch in the north wall, is another of a female, probably the wife of the former, dressed in the costume of the time. The entrances into both these graves were evidently on the outside of the building, where the openings appear to have been walled up with hewn stones very closely jointed. There are two other arches of the same kind, one on each side of the chancel, but unoccupied.

On the north side of the chancel is a large altar monument of black and white marble, enclosed within iron rails, supporting effigies in alabaster, of Sir John Herbert of Dan y Castell, knight, and his lady Joan. At the east end of this monument are the figures of a man, the head broken off, habited as a sergeant at law, and a female, both kneeling, intended for Sergeant Lehunt and his wife, the former of whom died in 1703 and the latter in 1694. Within the rails of the communion table are inscriptions to the memory of Sibil, the wife of Edward Herbert of Dan y Castell.

The church received a Grade II* heritage listing in 1963.

== Grounds ==
In the churchyard is a tombstone to the memory of Thomas Havard of Dan y crug, (near Brecon) who died March, 1762. Another tombstone within iron rails is to the memory of Edward Williams who died 30 November 1754. In the same cemetery is a tombstone commemorating the internment, in the year 1750 of Samuel Walbeoffe.

== Bibliography ==
- Jones, Theophilus (1809). A history of the county of Brecknock : in two volumes : containing the chorography, general history, religion, laws, customs, manners, language and system of agriculture used in that county (Public domain ed.). W. & G. North.
