= Borough of Brecknock =

Former district of Powys, Wales

Coordinates: 51.947°N 3.391°W

Brecknock Brycheiniog
- Population
  - 1971: 37,781
  - 1992 (estimate): 41,500
- History
  - Created: 1 April 1974
  - Abolished: 31 March 1996
  - Succeeded by: Powys
- Status: Borough
  - HQ: Brecon

The Borough of Brecknock (Welsh: Bwrdeistref Brycheiniog) was one of the three local government districts of the county of Powys, Wales from 1974 until 1996. It covered the majority of the former administrative county of Brecknockshire. The borough was abolished in 1996, with Powys County Council taking over its functions.

== History ==
The borough of Brecknock was created on 1 April 1974 under the Local Government Act 1972. It covered the area of the administrative county of Brecknockshire, which was abolished at the same time, with the exceptions of Brynmawr and Llanelly, which were transferred to Gwent, and Penderyn and Vaynor, which were transferred to Mid Glamorgan.

The borough covered the whole area of eight abolished districts and parts of another two:

- Brecon Municipal Borough
- Brecknock Rural District
- Builth Rural District
- Builth Wells Urban District
- Crickhowell Rural District except for Llanelly
- Hay Rural District
- Hay Urban District
- Llanwrtyd Wells Urban District
- Ystradfellte from Vaynor and Penderyn Rural District
- Ystradgynlais Rural District

The borough was abolished by the Local Government (Wales) Act 1994, with its functions transferring to Powys County Council on 1 April 1996.

== Political control ==
The first election to the council was held in 1973, initially operating as a shadow authority before coming into its powers on 1 April 1974. A majority of the seats on the council were held by independents throughout the council's existence.

Party in control	Years
Independent	1974–1996

== Premises ==
The council was initially based at Oxford House on The Watton in Brecon, which had previously been the offices of Brecknock Rural District Council. By 1988 the council had moved to a modern office building called Neuadd Brycheiniog on Cambrian Way in Brecon. After the council's abolition Neuadd Brycheiniog became an area office for Powys County Council.
