= Llanwrtyd Wells =

Llanwrtyd Wells: Welsh: Llanwrtyd
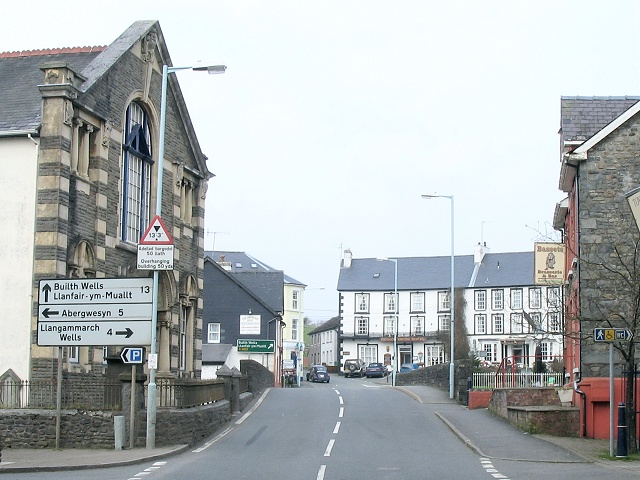

- Location within Powys
- Population: 850 (2011)
- OS grid reference: SN877465
  - Cardiff: 65.1 miles (104.8 km)
  - London: 198 miles (319 km)
- Principal area: Powys
- Country: Wales
- Sovereign state: United Kingdom
- Post town: LLANWRTYD WELLS
- Postcode district: LD5
- Dialling code: 01591
- Police: Dyfed-Powys
- Fire: Mid and West Wales
- Ambulance: Welsh
- UK Parliament: Brecon, Radnor and Cwm Tawe
- Senedd Cymru – Welsh Parliament: Brecon & Radnorshire
- List of places UK Wales Powys 52.10539°N 3.64110°W Community map: Map of the community

Llanwrtyd Wells (Welsh: Llanwrtyd "church of St Gwrtud") is a market town and community in Powys, Wales, in the historic county of Brecknockshire (Breconshire) on the Afon Irfon. The town is on the A483 between Llandovery and Builth Wells and is located near the pass between the Tywi and Irfon valleys.

The community also includes the smaller settlements of Llanwrtyd and Abergwesyn, the valley of the Afon Irfon, and a large part of the "Desert of Wales".

With a population of 850 (United Kingdom Census 2011), it claims to be the smallest town in Britain, although Fordwich in Kent has a smaller population.

== History ==
Llanwrtyd Wells grew in the 19th century as a spa town around the Ffynnon Ddrewllyd ("stinking well"), 1.5 miles from the much older settlement of Llanwrtyd. The town was also known as an eisteddfod site, and is the site of both the World Bog Snorkelling Championships and the annual Man versus Horse Marathon, as well as other annual events.

The Abernant Lake Hotel was built on the site of an old farm, to cater for the many visitors, keen to take the spa waters. The hotel grounds include a 5 acres (2 ha) lake created in 1903 by damming an oxbow of the Irfon. During World War II, the hotel was home to Bromsgrove School, evacuated from Worcestershire. From 1943–45 it housed the Czechoslovak State School for Refugee Children, where pupils included Alf Dubs. It remained as a hotel until 2007 when it became home to a multi-activity centre for school groups and families.

Llanwrtyd Wells had two golf clubs and courses during the 20th century, both now defunct. The early course was at the Dol-y-coed Hotel and the later one at Abernant Lake Hotel.

== Cambrian Mill ==
Built in 1852, the Cambrian Woollen Mill was the largest woollen mill in the Llanidloes area, employing over 250 workers at its peak. It was reduced to an empty shell by a fire in November 1889, but rebuilt in 1902 and has been in continuous operation since then. It is one of very few woolen mills still operating in Wales. According to the mill's website, visitors can experience "700 years of weaving history".

== Spa ==
Following the discovery in 1732 by the Rev. Theophilus Evans of waters claimed to have healing properties, Llanwrtyd Wells became a spa town. (In 1740 Wales' most famous hymn-writer, William Williams Pantycelyn was appointed curate to Evans.) The spa was referred to as Ffynnon Ddrewllyd "Stinking Well" because of the strong smell of hydrogen sulfide. The spa is located at the site of the Dol-y-Coed Hotel, now the home of Charcroft Electronics.

The fashion for spas reached its peak in the Victorian era and many of the hotels in the town date back to that time. The Belle Vue Hotel, the only purpose-built hotel in Llanwrtyd, was built in 1843.

== Modern times ==
In contrast to its history as a spa town, when hundreds flocked to take the waters for their claimed medicinal effects, the area is now better known for recreations such as pony trekking, mountain biking, walking and birdwatching, and for its annual Man versus Horse Marathon, Beer Festival, World Bog Snorkeling Championship and Welsh Open stone skimming championship. The World Record for the longest distance a stone has been skimmed was set on Abernant Lake by Dougie Isaacs, a Scotsman. The town's largest employer Charcroft Electronics is located in buildings which were previously the Dol-y-Coed Hotel. The hotel, on the banks of the Irfon, dates from about 1535.

In 1984 the town was the location for the filming of the BBC sitcom The Magnificent Evans, written by Roy Clarke and starring Ronnie Barker, Sharon Morgan and Myfanwy Talog.

== Governance ==
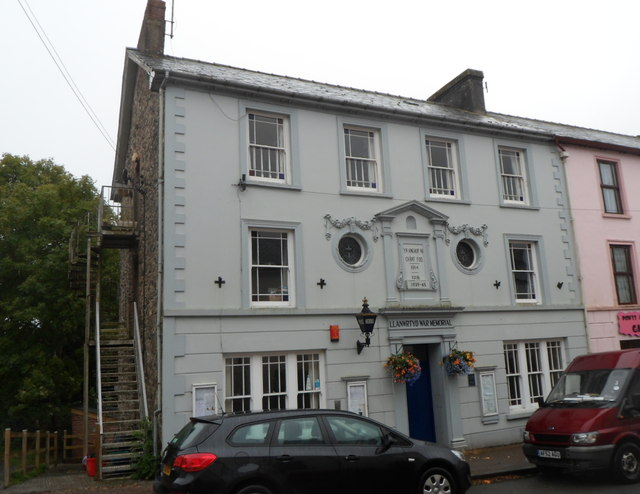
Llanwrtyd Wells War Memorial Institute: Serves as meeting place of town council

There are two tiers of local government covering Llanwrtyd Wells, at community (town) and county level: Llanwrtyd Wells Town Council and Powys County Council. The town council meets at the Institute on Irfon Terrace.

A Llanwrtyd Wells electoral ward exists, which also includes the neighbouring communities of Llangammarch Wells and Treflys. This ward had a population of 1,875 at the 2011 Census.

=== Administrative history ===
Llanwrtyd was an ancient parish in the historic county of Brecknockshire. When elected parish and district councils were established in 1894 it was given a parish council and administered by the Llandovery Rural District, most of which was in Carmarthenshire. Llanwrtyd was transferred to the Builth Rural District in 1898. In 1907 part of the old parish of Llanwrtyd was converted into an urban district called Llanwrtyd Wells. The remainder of the old parish outside the urban district became a separate parish called Llanwrtyd Without.

Llanwrtyd Wells Urban District was abolished in 1974, with its area becoming a community called Llanwrtyd Wells instead. District-level functions passed to Brecknock Borough Council, which in turn was abolished in 1996 and its functions passed to Powys County Council. The Llanwrtyd Wells and Llanwrtyd Without communities were merged into a single community called Llanwrtyd Wells in 1986, which also took in the Abergwesyn area to the north.

== Transport ==
Unlike many small towns in rural Wales, Llanwrtyd station still has a passenger train service. Heart of Wales line trains between Swansea and Shrewsbury call four times a day each way Monday to Saturday and twice each way on Sunday (2019 timetable)

== Notable residents ==
The town is the home of Robin Kevan, also known as "Rob the Rubbish", who has become famous for his efforts to clean up Britain's countryside.

== Town twinning ==
Llanwrtyd Wells is twinned with:

- Mériel, France
- Český Krumlov, Czech Republic
