= Llanwrtyd =

- Parish
- Ecclesiastical Parish of Llanwrtyd
- Location within Powys
- Coordinates: 52.11589°N 3.66193°W
- Country: Wales
- Local government county: Powys
- Historic county: Brecknockshire
- Diocese: Swansea and Brecon
- Dedication: St David
- OS grid reference: SN862478
- Deposited registers: 1748-1991

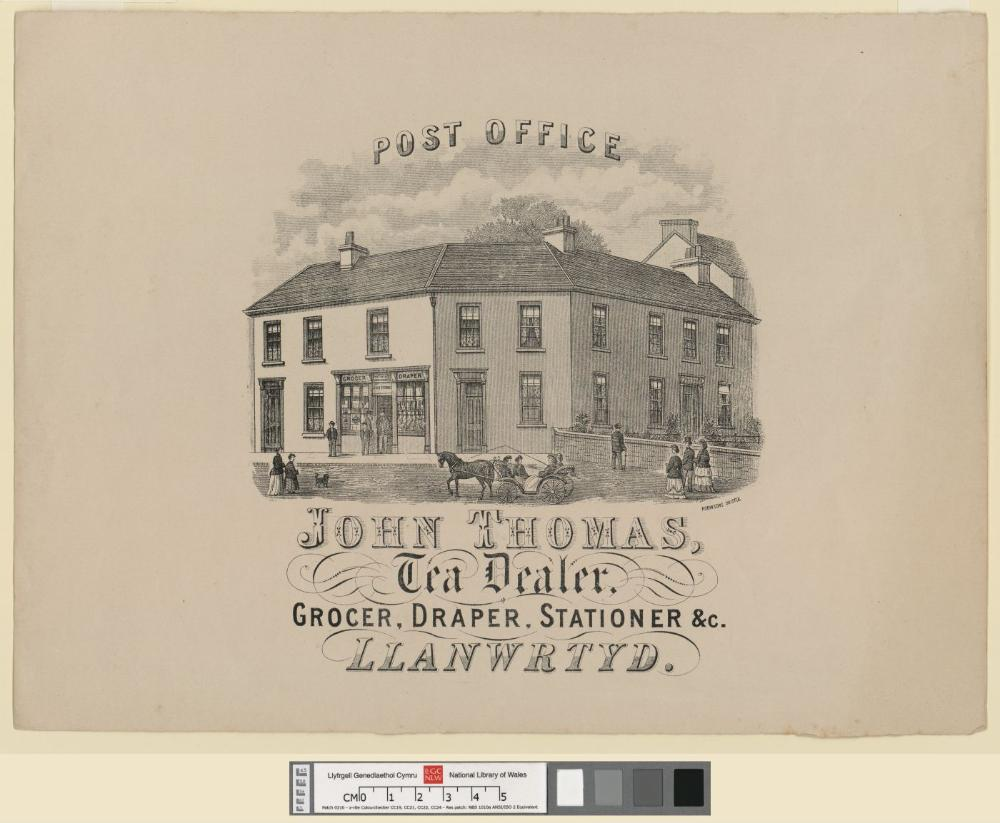
Post Office, Llanwrtyd. John Thomas, Tea Dealer.

Llanwrtyd is a small settlement in Powys, mid-Wales, in the historic county of Brecknockshire (Breconshire), through which flows the River Irfon. It lies 1.5 miles north of the town of Llanwrtyd Wells.

Llanwrtyd was historically the centre of a much larger parish which included Llanwrtyd Wells. The name Llanwrtyd is shared with the ancient parish, and is also sometimes applied to Llanwrtyd Wells (particularly in Welsh). The current community is called Llanwrtyd Wells, and includes Llanwrtyd, Llanwrtyd Wells and Abergwesyn.

== Origin of the name ==
The Clwyd-Powys Archaeological Trust (CPAT) survey suggests that the name Llanwrtyd is a combination of church ("llan") and a name "Gwrtud" or "Gwrtyd", ("Gwrtyd's Church"). The present dedication to Saint David, in whose diocese the church stands, is likely later. The earliest documented reference, to "Llanworted", dates from 1543. The traditional derivation of the name is given in the Reverend Thomas Morgan's Handbook of the Origin of Pace-names in Wales and Monmouthshire. This suggests the name comes from "Llanddewi wrth y rhyd" (David's church by the ford). Again, tradition says that the church was founded by St David in the 6th century and the CPAT survey notes the curved boundary around the churchyard and its siting by a river, both features which indicate that the church was established before the Norman Conquest. The church was a chapel attached to Llangammarch.

== History ==
Llanwrtyd was an ancient parish, a curacy attached to the vicarage of Llangammarch. The parish church of St David dates from the 11th century and is a Grade II* listed building.

Theophilus Jones, in his A History of the County of Brecknock, was fairly disparaging of the parish; when describing the church he states "there is nothing deserving of notice in this miserable fabric, unless it be an inscription on the wall, to the memory of an old woman of the name of Jones."

In 1740 the curate in the parishes of Llanwrtyd, Llanfihangel Abergwesyn and Llanddewi Abergwesyn, was Wales' most famous hymn-writer William Williams Pantycelyn.

The population in 1801 was about 500 which had risen to 854 by the 1901 census. After the coming of the railway in 1867 the parish played host to at least 12,000 visitors annually to drink the mineral waters at the sulphur springs about a mile and a half down river from the church, and the small town of Llanwrtyd Wells at the springs became the main population centre of the parish. In 1897 the church of St James was built in Llanwrtyd Wells.

Thomas Powel (1845–1922) was born in Llanwrtyd. He became a Welsh Celtic scholar and Professor of Celtic at University College, Cardiff from 1884 to 1918.

The parish became a civil parish (sometimes known in English as Llanwrtud). In 1907 the parish was split when Llanwrtyd Wells was made an urban district. The parish of Llanwrtyd was reduced to cover the same area as the Llanwrtyd Wells Urban District, and the remainder of the old parish became a separate civil parish called Llanwrtyd Without. When civil parishes and urban districts were abolished in Wales in 1974, the former urban district became a community called Llanwrtyd Wells and Llanwrtyd Without also became a community. The two were merged into a single community called Llanwrtyd Wells in 1986.
