= Low-water crossing =

Roadway usable only at low water levels

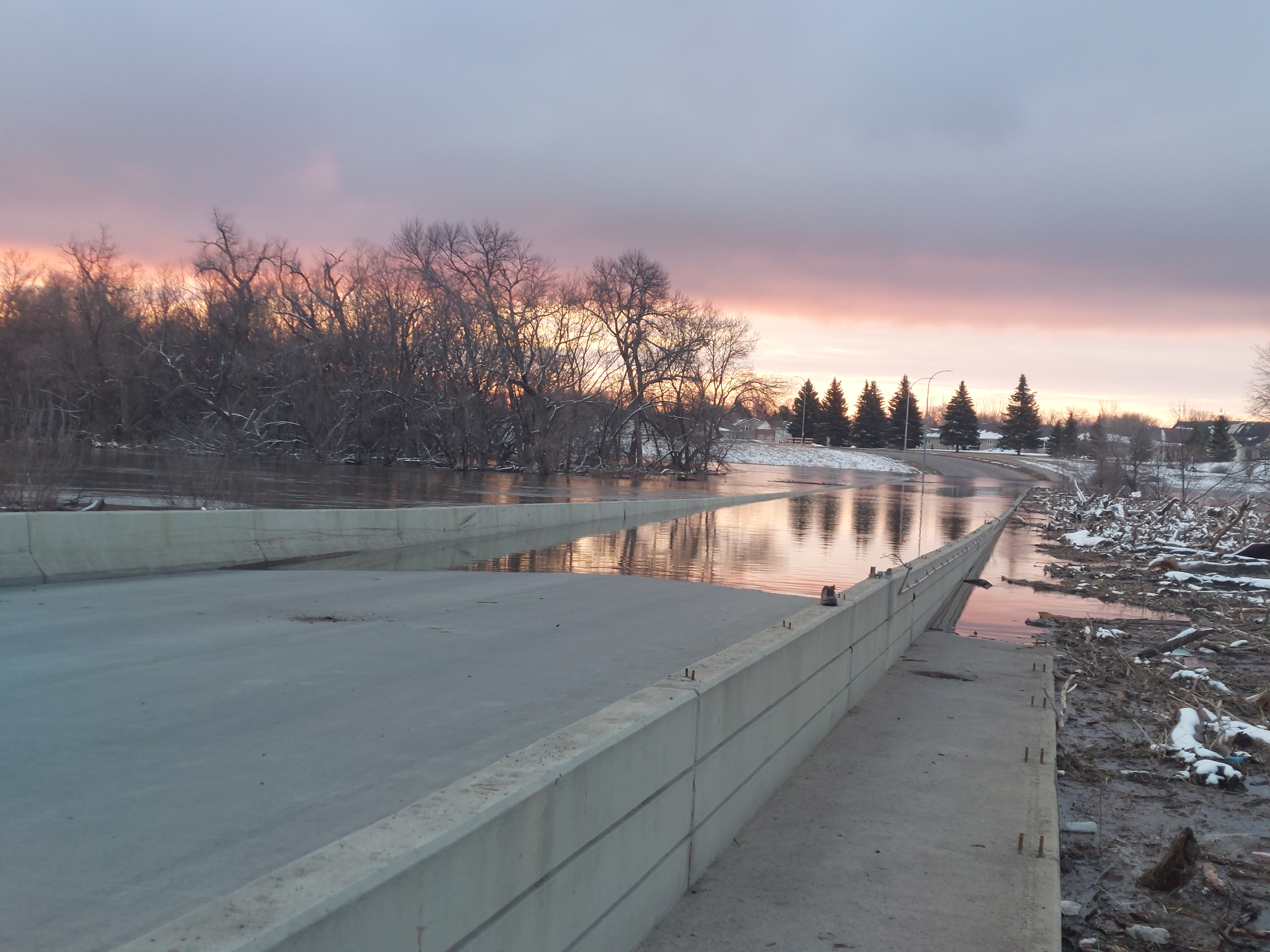
A low-water crossing in Fargo, North Dakota, United States of America during a routine flooding event on the Red River of the North. The water level was at 29.5 feet (9.0 m), just below the threshold for a major flood as defined by the National Weather Service.

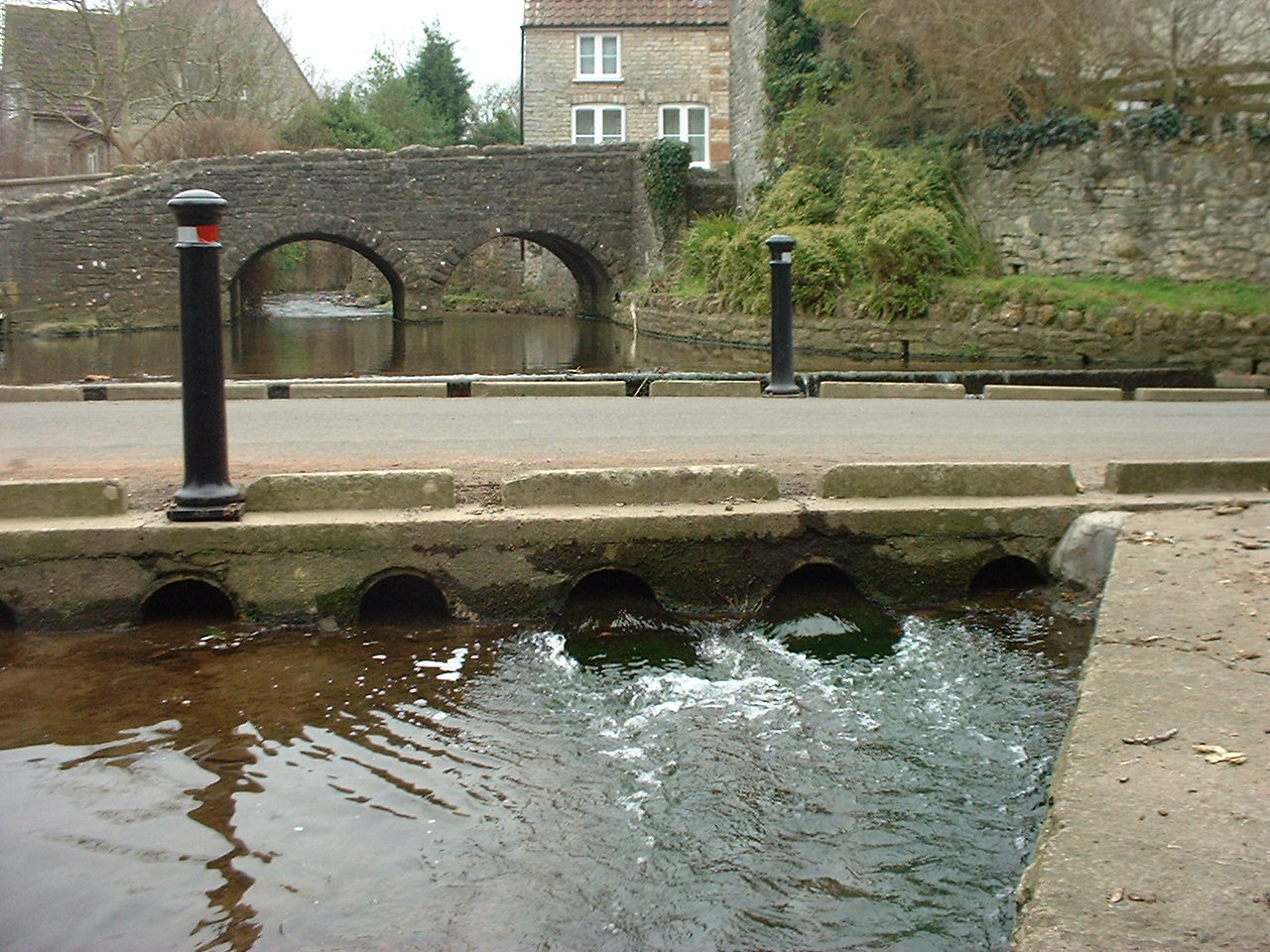
Low-water crossing (vented ford) at Chew Stoke, Somerset, United Kingdom

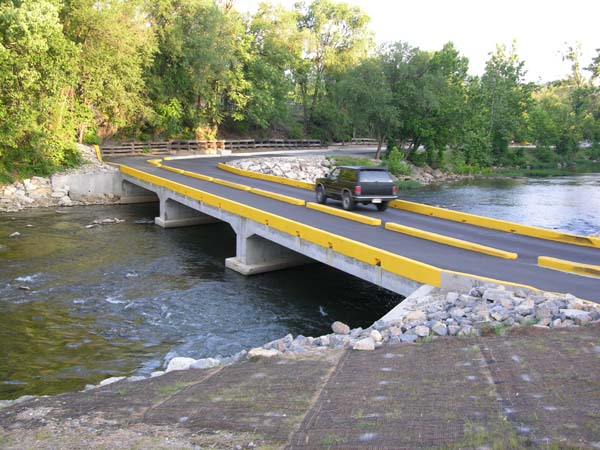
Roanoke River low water bridge, USA

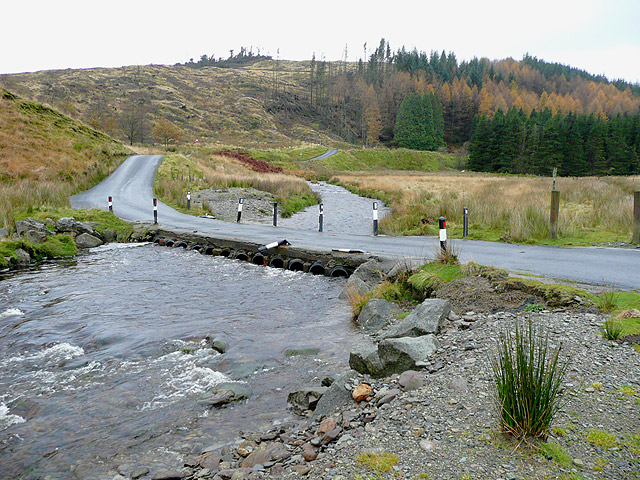
The drovers' road from Abergwesyn to Tregaron, Wales, United Kingdom, crosses the Afon Irfon via the Irish bridge at the foot of the Devil's Staircase

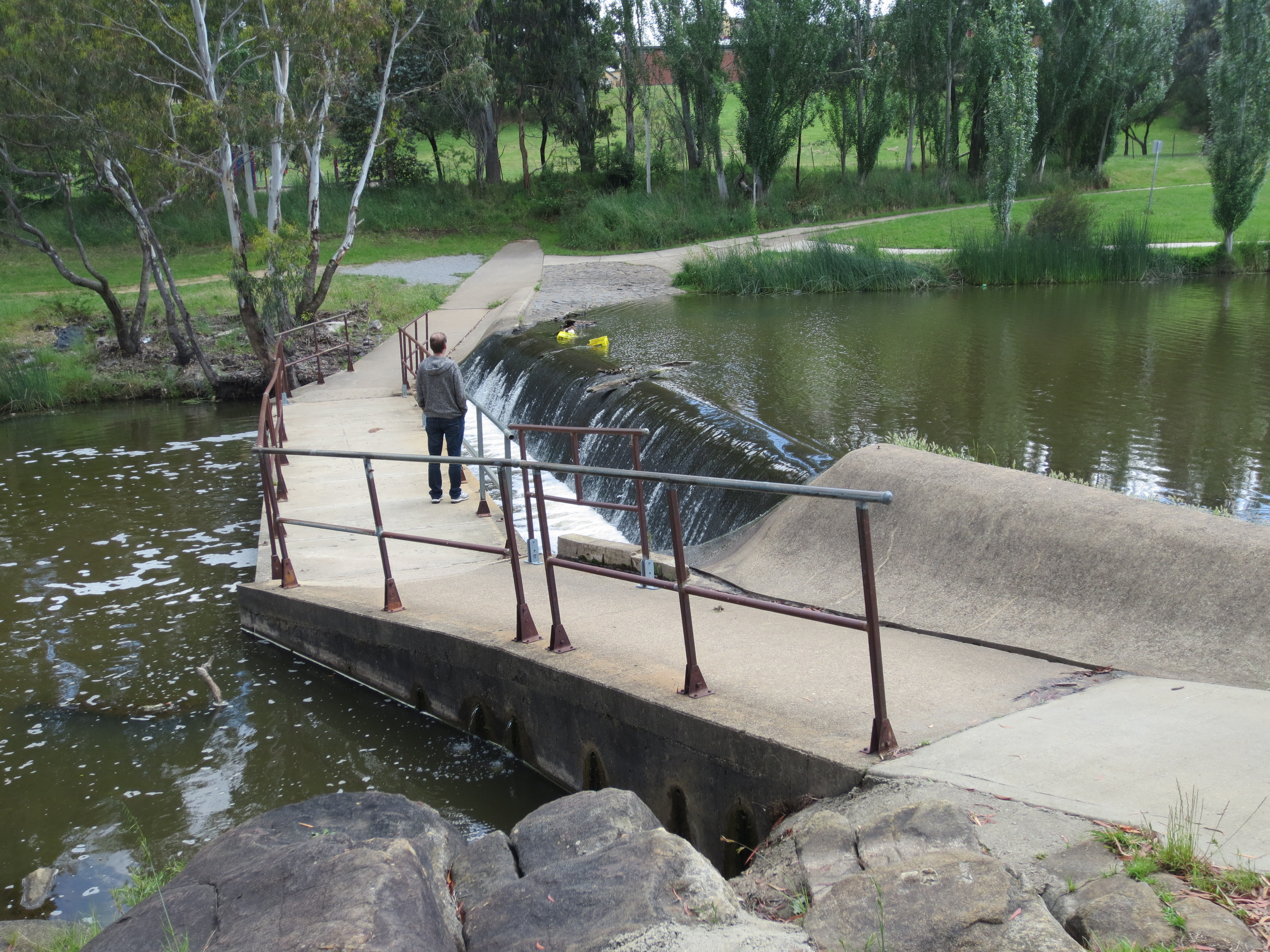
Shared pedestrian/cycle way over the Yass River in Yass, New South Wales, Australia

A low-water crossing (also known as an Irish bridge or Irish Crossing, causeway in Australia, low-level crossing or low-water bridge) is a low-elevation roadway traversing a waterbody that stays dry above the water when the flow is low, but is designed to be submerged under high-flow conditions such as floods. This type of crossing is much cheaper to build than a high bridge that keeps the road surface consistently above the highest water level, and is usually deployed in semi-arid areas where high-volume rainfall is rare and the existing channel is shallow (which requires extra ramping on the banks to build a more elevated bridge and thus costs more), particularly in developing countries.

Low-water crossings are essentially elevated floodways, functioning like causeways under normal conditions and serving as limited fords during high-discharge conditions. They are generally considered unsafe for traffic during floods due to the potentially fast and turbulent currents flowing over the road surface, and can be dangerous even after the flood has receded because silt, mud and debris left on the road by the water can reduce traction and cause skiding risks for both vehicles and pedestrians.

In Japan, a Konnyaku bridge is a type of low-water crossing.

== Construction ==
The low-water crossing was developed from the traditional ford. A ford permits vehicular traffic to cross a waterway with wet wheels. In some countries the term “low-water crossing” implies that the crossing is usually dry, while “ford” implies that the crossing is usually wet.

The simplest type of low water crossing is called an unvented ford or drift. This type of low water crossing is used mainly for shallow waterways or dry streambeds. It consists of an improved surface of gravel, gravel-filled geotextile grid, paving blocks, or concrete slabs positioned to match the slope and elevation of the adjacent waterway and floodplain.

To cross somewhat deeper waterways, a type of low water crossing called a vented ford can be constructed with culverts. The size of the culverts (often concrete pipes) is usually selected to allow the water to flow below the roadway and provide a dry crossing surface for most of the year. During periods of high water flow (e.g. spring runoff or flash floods), water will flow over the top of the crossing, as the culverts are not large enough to carry these flood-type runoff events.

A more elaborate low-water bridge will usually be an engineered concrete structure. There are thousands of such structures in the arid climates of the western United States; some of them accommodate four-lane city streets or highways. Typically, a low-water bridge that accommodates a high daily volume of vehicular traffic will be underwater only a few days per decade.

== Navigation ==
A low-water bridge renders the waterway non-navigable. In almost all cases this is not a practical concern, since the waterway would be non-navigable except during flood conditions anyway.

A low-water bridge is sometimes called a submersible bridge, but this is a misnomer. A true submersible bridge is used on navigable waterways and is actively lowered into the water.

== Safety ==
The concept behind low-water crossings is that they are convenient and safe to use in normal conditions. Once the water level rises to the point where it crosses the bridge surface, the bridge is generally unsafe to use due to high current. The force of the moving water may be strong enough to physically push the vehicle off the bridge: the higher the percentage of the vehicle in the water, the more likely the water's force will take the vehicle off the bridge and send it downriver with substantial damage. An additional risk for trying to cross a bridge under water, especially when more than a couple of feet deep, is the possibility of the vehicle's engine stalling. As people will typically try to then get out of the vehicle, they may step into water currents that cause them to fall or be pulled down into the water. As the current during floods is often quite strong, it may sweep them downriver and carry them into debris, possibly causing injury or death.

In developed countries this will usually be indicated by warning signs. An additional hazard is that the bridge surface may become completely obscured by the water, making it relatively easy to fall off the bridge surface into the deeper and more hazardous water on either side. As a consequence, the line of the submerged bridge is often marked with poles or other structures to indicate its course to unwary travelers and emergency users even when submerged.

Despite the obvious dangers and warnings given there are still a significant number of emergencies and even deaths attributable to the unwary use of low-water bridges during flood conditions.

One attempted solution/deterrent is the Stupid motorist law in the American state of Arizona. Drivers who become stranded on flooded low-water bridges are charged with the cost incurred by emergency services to come to their rescue.

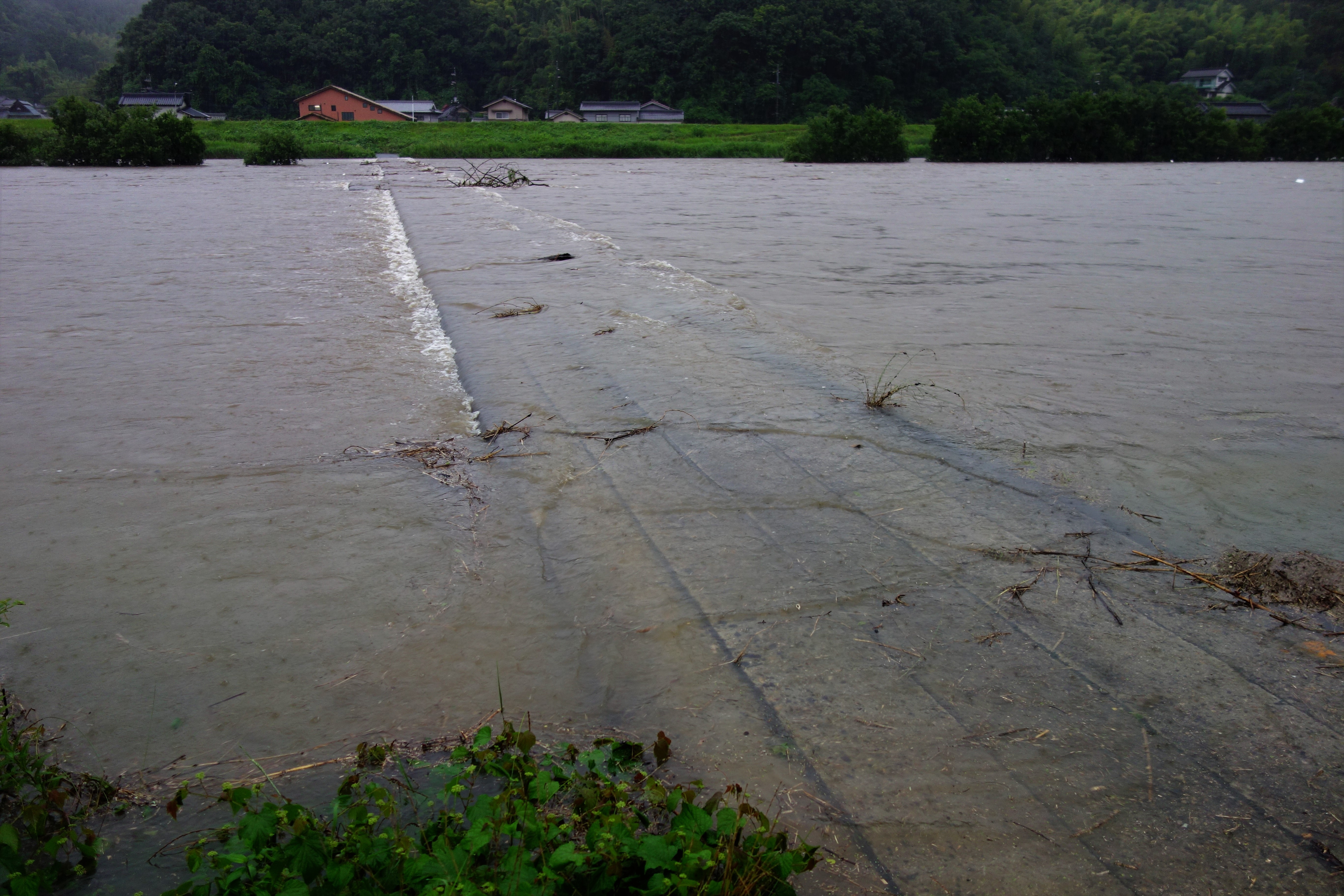
Flooded Low-water crossing

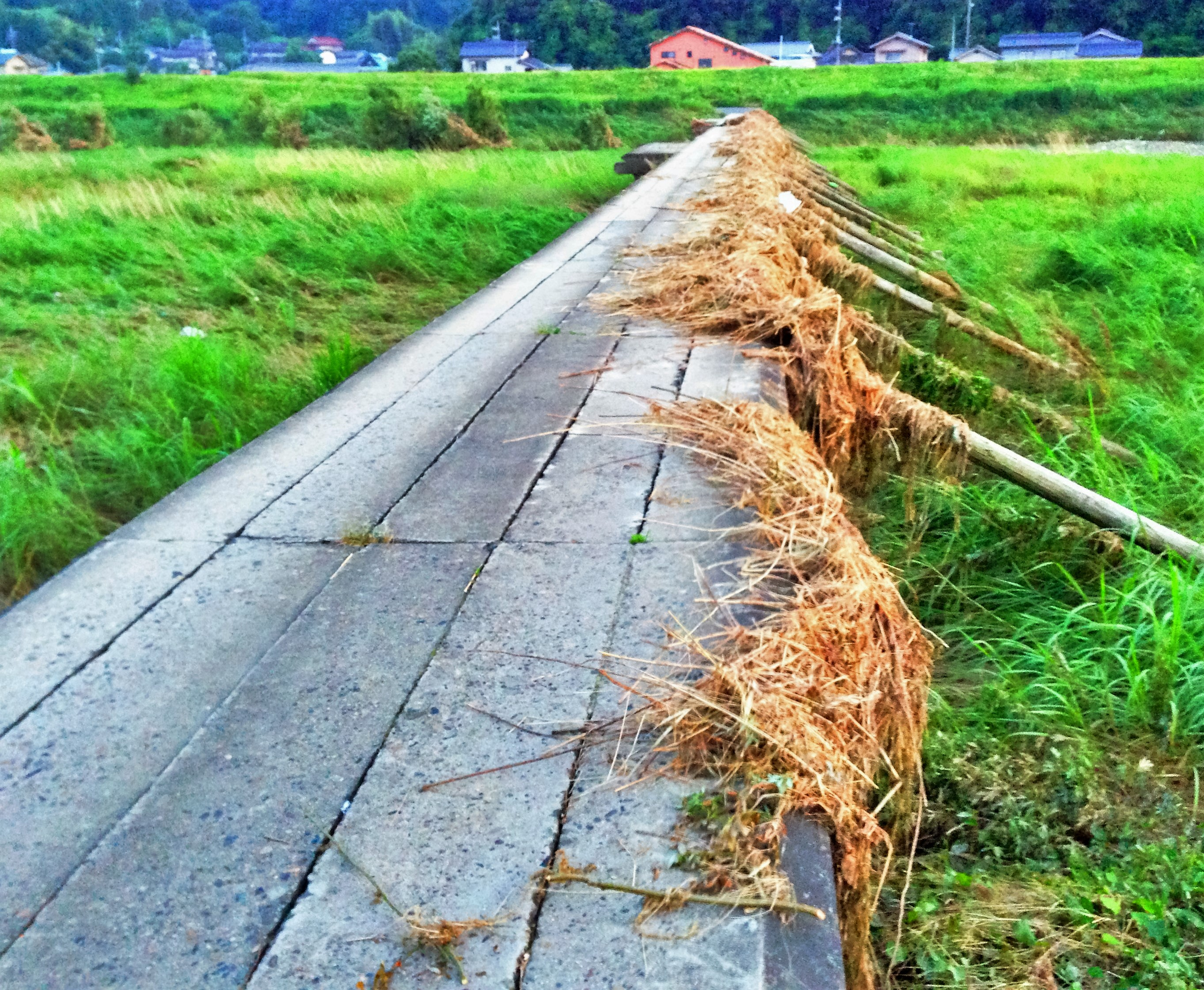
Bridge after the flood (No Entry)

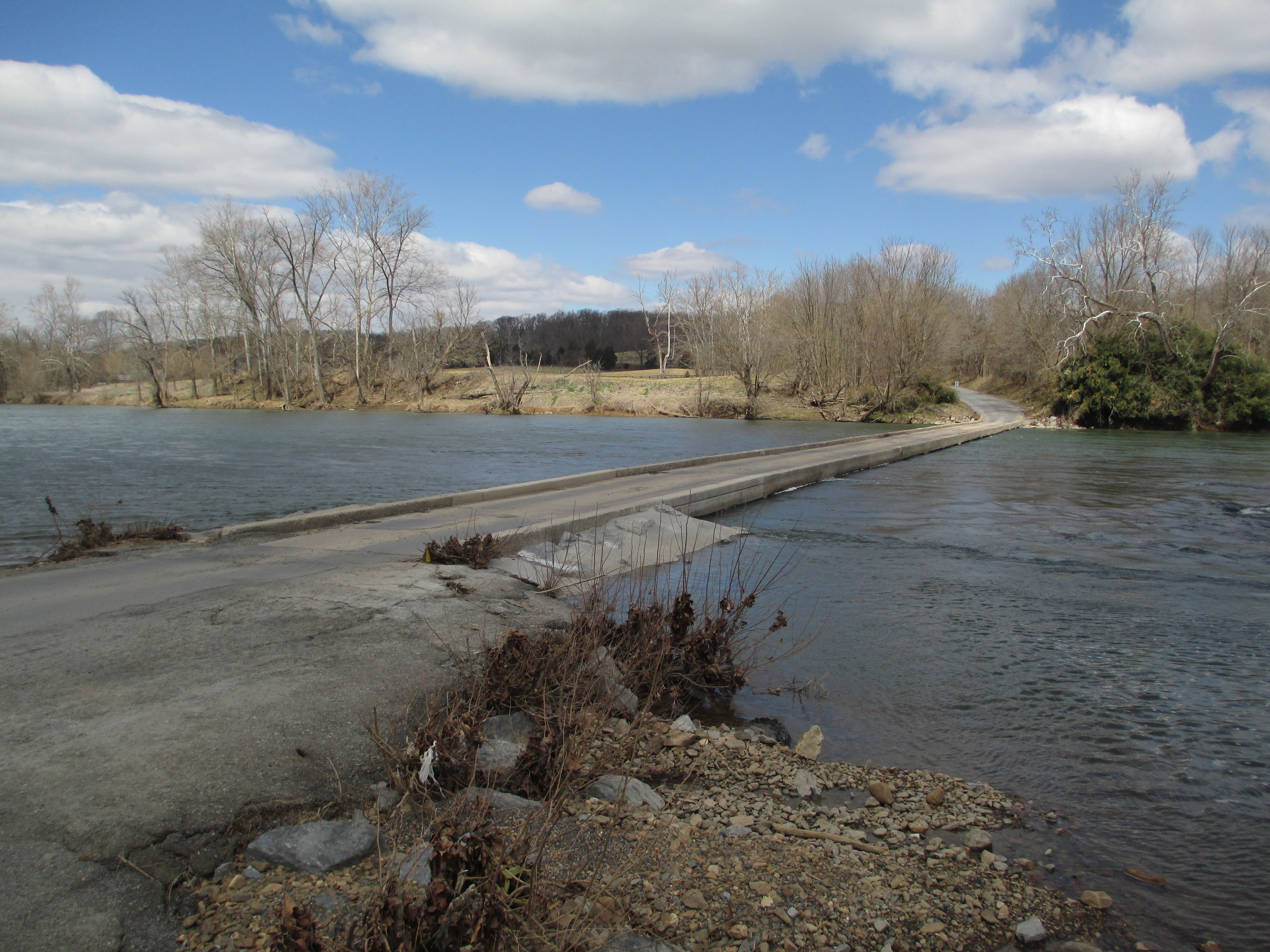
The former single-lane low-water bridge over the Shenandoah River in Virginia. This bridge was replaced in 2019.

== Fish passage at low-water crossings ==
Since 1980, the ecological impact of road crossings on natural streams and rivers has been recognised. Baffles may be installed along the culvert to provide some fish-friendly alternative. But baffles can reduce drastically the culvert discharge capacity for a given afflux, thus increasing substantially the total cost of the culvert structure to achieve the same design discharge and afflux, or increasing the risk of road flooding in an existing structure.
