= Llanwrtyd Wells (electoral ward) =

Coordinates: 52.1080°N 3.6111°W

Llanwrtyd Wells ward
- Electoral ward
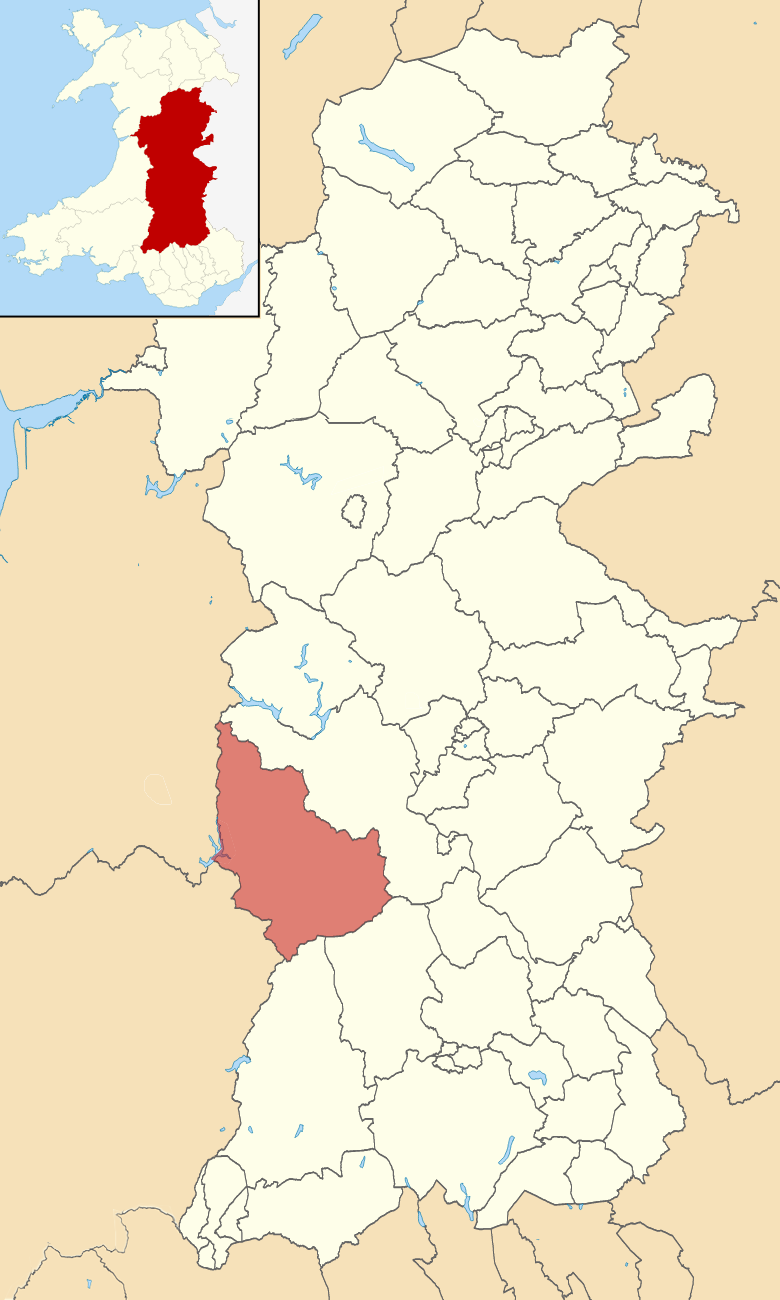
- Location of (pre-2022) Llanwrtyd Wells ward in Powys
- Population: 1,875 (2011 census)
- Principal area: Powys
- Country: Wales
- Sovereign state: United Kingdom
- Dialling code: 01591
- UK Parliament: Brecon, Radnor and Cwm Tawe
- Senedd Cymru – Welsh Parliament: Brecon and Radnorshire
- Councillors: 1 (County)

Llanwrtyd Wells is an electoral ward in mid Powys, Wales. It covers three local government communities and elects a councillor to Powys County Council.

== Description ==
The Llanwrtyd Wells ward covers the sparsely populated communities of Llanwrtyd Wells, Llangamarch and part of Treflys, including the small town of Llanwrtyd Wells and the villages of Llangammarch Wells and Beulah. Ceredigion and Carmarthenshire border the ward to the west. The Powys ward of Llanafanfawr with Garth borders to the east, with Maescar/Llywel and Yscir with Honddu Isaf and Llanddew to the south.

According to the 2011 UK Census the population of the ward was 1,875.

Following a boundary review to improve electoral parity, the Treflys community ward of Garth was transferred to Llanafanfawr, effective from the 2022 local elections.

== County elections ==
Since the May 1995 local government election, it has been represented by one county councillor on Powys County Council. Councillor Tim Van Rees, an independent, represented the ward from 1995 to 2022. He was a previous chairman of the county council. Councillor Van Rees retained his seat unopposed in May 2017. At the May 2022 local election Peter James, also an independent, was elected.
