= Bog snorkelling =

Race thru a peat bog trench

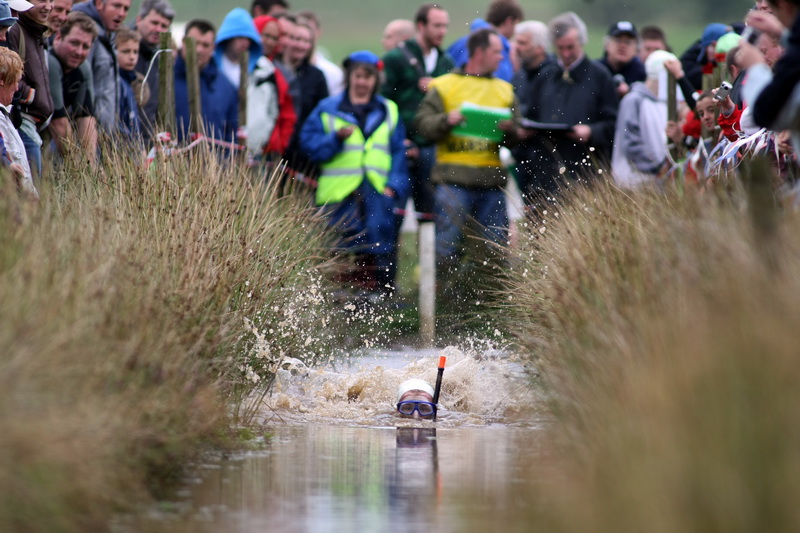
- Competitor of the World Bog Snorkelling Championship
- First played: 1976, Llanwrtyd Wells, Wales, United Kingdom

Characteristics
- Team members: No
- Mixed-sex: Yes, but in separate leagues
- Type: Outdoor, aquatic
- Venue: Water-filled trench cut through a peat bog

Bog snorkelling is a sporting event where competitors aim to complete two consecutive lengths of a 60 yards (55 m) water-filled trench cut through a peat bog in the shortest time possible, wearing traditional snorkel, diving mask and flippers. They complete the course without swimming, relying on flipper power alone.

The women's world record stands at 1 minute 22.56 seconds by Kirsty Johnson in 2014. The men's world record was set by Neil Rutter in 2018, with a time of 1 min 18.81 seconds. Both were set at the Waen Rhydd bog, Llanwrtyd Wells in Wales.

== Rules ==
- A water-filled trench 60 yards (55 m) in length must be cut through a peat bog by the organisers.
- Competitors must wear snorkels, masks and flippers.
- A wetsuit is not compulsory, but is often worn.
- Bog snorkelling competitors must traverse two consecutive lengths totalling 120 yards (110 m) in the shortest time possible.
- The course must be completed without using conventional swimming strokes, relying on flipper power alone.

== World record history ==
Time	Record holder	Location and date
1 min 44 sec	Peter Beaumont of Wales	Waen Rhydd bog, Llanwrtyd Wells, Powys, Wales in 1997.
1 min 39 sec	(Republic of Ireland) John Cantillon of Dublin	Llanwrtyd Wells 2000.
1 min 35.46 sec	(Wales) Philip John	Llanwrtyd Wells 2003.
1 min 34 sec	Casey Squibb from Dorset, England	Alice's Loft & Cottages, Doohamlet, Castleblayney, County Monaghan in 2009.
1 min 28 sec	Connor Murphy from Portadown, County Armagh, Northern Ireland	Doohamlet, later the same day in 2009.
1 min 23.13 sec	Dineka Maguire from Northern Ireland	Llanwrtyd Wells 2013.
1 min 22.56 sec	(England) Kirsty Johnson (Current women's world record)	Llanwrtyd Wells 24 August 2014.
1 min 19 sec	(Republic of Ireland) Paddy Lambe from Castleblayney, County Monaghan	Irish Bog Snorkelling Championship 2016 (His sister Moira Lambe also won the ladies' event.)
1 min 18.81 sec	(England) Neil Rutter (Current world record)	Llanwrtyd Wells 26 August 2018.

== World Bog Snorkelling Championship ==
The World Bog Snorkelling Championship, first held in 1985, takes place every August Bank Holiday in the dense Waen Rhydd peat bog, near Llanwrtyd Wells in mid Wales. Competitors travel from as far afield as Australia, Belgium, Canada, China, England, Finland, Germany, Ireland, New Zealand, Poland, Russia, South Africa, South Korea, Wales and the US.

Llanwrtyd Wells location map

Other bog snorkelling events take place, particularly in Wales, but also in Australia, Ireland, and Sweden. These include the Bog Snorkelling Triathlon, which consists of a 120 yards (110 metres) snorkel, a 19 miles (31 kilometres) bike ride and a 7 1/2 miles (12.1 km) run.

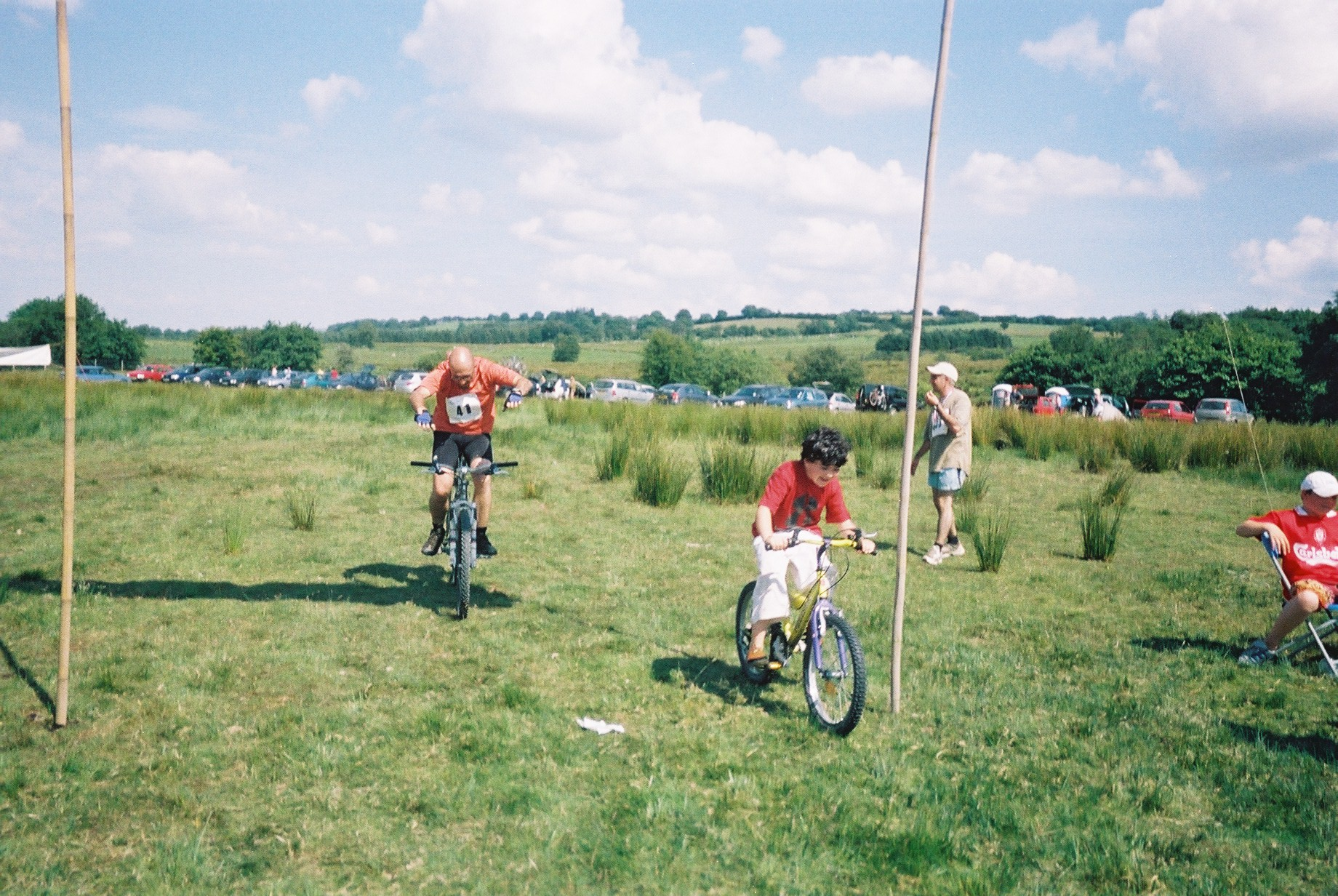
World Mountain Bike Bog Snorkelling Championship 2006

Proceeds from the World Championship go to a local charity each year. Past recipients include the Cystic Fibrosis Trust (2005) and the Motor Neurone Association (2006). The 2006 charity was chosen in memory of the Green Events treasurer, Ron Skilton, who died in December 2005.

== In popular culture ==
- 2019 - Royal Mail issue a collectable stamps edition of UK Weird and Wonderful Customs which includes Bog snorkelling at Llanwrtyd Wells, World Gurning Championship at Egremont, Up Helly Aa in Lerwick, Burning the Clocks in Brighton, 'Obby 'Oss festival in Padstow, Samhain Celtic festival (Halloween) at Derry, Horn Dance at Abbots Bromley and Cheese-Rolling at Cooper's Hill.
