= Garth railway station =

Garth railway station may refer to the following stations in Wales:

- Garth railway station (Bridgend), on the Maesteg line, in the village of Garth, Bridgend
- Garth railway station (Powys), on the Heart of Wales line, in Garth, Powys
