= Treflys =

- Population: 484
- OS grid reference: SN 903 508
  - Cardiff: 49.9 mi (80.3 km)
  - London: 154.4 mi (248.5 km)
- Community: Treflys
- Principal area: Powys
- Country: Wales
- Sovereign state: United Kingdom
- Post town: LLANGAMMARCH WELLS
- Postcode district: LD4
- Post town: LLANWRTYD WELLS
- Postcode district: LD5
- Police: Dyfed-Powys
- Fire: Mid and West Wales
- Ambulance: Welsh
- List of places UK Wales Powys 52.145°N 3.605°W Map of the community

Treflys is a community in the county of Powys, Wales, and is 49.9 miles (80.4 km) from Cardiff and 154.4 miles (248.5 km) from London. In 2011 the population of Treflys was 484 with 15.1% of them able to speak Welsh. It is in the historic county of Brecknockshire.

The villages of Beulah, Llanfechan and Garth lies within the community. Eglwys Oen Duw is a Grade II* Listed Building situated between Beulah and Abergwesyn, approximately 1.2 km NW of Beulah village. Treflys, in the Middle Ages was a "Cwmwd" within the Cantref of Buellt.

For elections to Powys County Council, Treflys is covered by the Llanwrtyd Wells electoral ward.

== See also ==
- List of localities in Wales by population
