= LD postcode area =

Postcode area within the United Kingdom

Llandrindod Wells
- Postcode area
- Coordinates: 52.130°N 3.340°W
- Country: United Kingdom
- Postcode area: LD
- Postcode area name: Llandrindod Wells
- Post towns: 8
- Postcode districts: 8
- Postcode sectors: 16
- Postcodes (live): 2,203
- Postcodes (total): 2,649
- Statistics as at May 2020

The LD postcode area, also known as the Llandrindod Wells postcode area, is a group of eight postcode districts in Wales. These postcode districts cover much of south Powys, including Llandrindod Wells, Brecon, Builth Wells, Presteigne, Knighton, Rhayader, Llanwrtyd Wells and Llangammarch Wells. The LD6 district also covers one isolated farmhouse in Ceredigion. The LD7 and LD8 districts extend across the border into England, covering very small parts of Shropshire and Herefordshire.

The LD area is sparsely populated and contains fewer postcodes than any other area on the British mainland, except for the KW area in the north-east of Scotland.

== Coverage ==
The approximate coverage of the postcode districts:

Postcode district	Post town	Coverage	Local authority area(s)
LD1	LLANDRINDOD WELLS	Llandrindod Wells, Crossgates, Newbridge-on-Wye	Powys
LD2	BUILTH WELLS	Builth Wells, Llanafan Fawr, Erwood	Powys
LD3	BRECON	Brecon, Talgarth	Powys
LD4	LLANGAMMARCH WELLS	Llangammarch Wells, Garth, Cefn Gorwydd	Powys
LD5	LLANWRTYD WELLS	Llanwrtyd Wells, Beulah, Abergwesyn	Powys
LD6	RHAYADER	Rhayader, St Harmon, Pant-Y-Dwr	Powys, Ceredigion
LD7	KNIGHTON	Knighton, Knucklas, Llangunllo, Llanfair Waterdine	Powys, Shropshire
LD8	PRESTEIGNE	Presteigne, New Radnor, Norton, Stapleton	Powys, Herefordshire

== Map ==
LD postcode area map, showing postcode districts in red and post towns in grey text, with links to nearby CF, HR, NP, SA and SY postcode areas.

== See also ==
- Postcode Address File
- List of postcode areas in the United Kingdom
