= Llanwrtyd railway station =

Railway station in Powys, Wales

Llanwrtyd
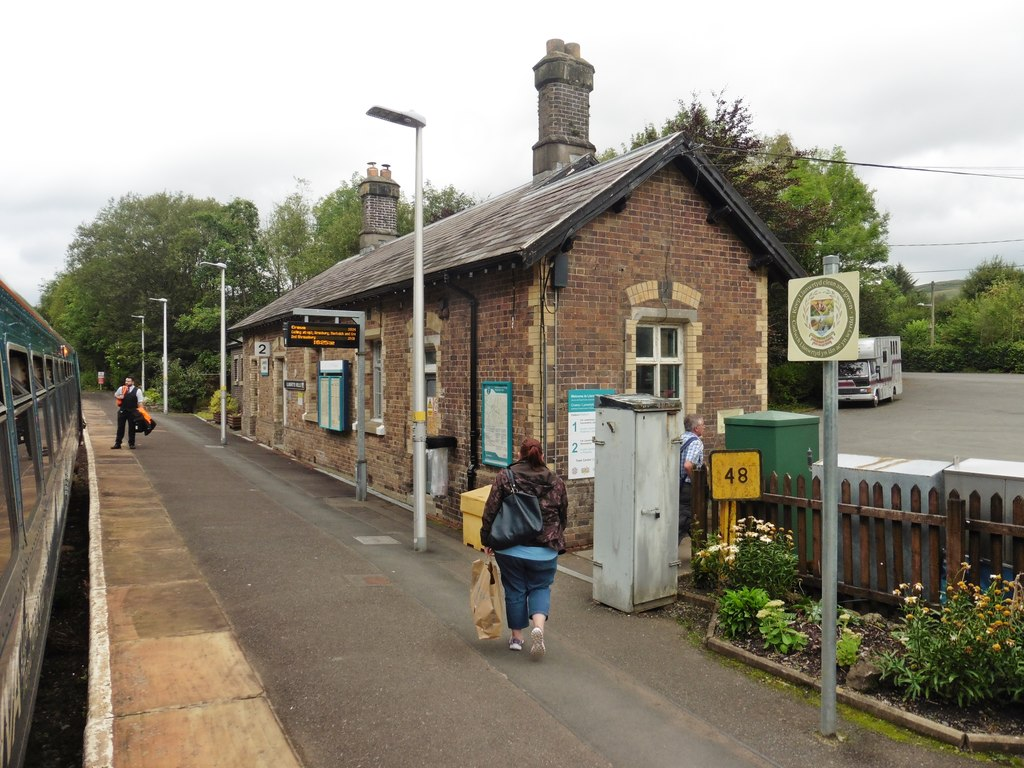

General information
- Location: Llanwrtyd Wells, Powys; Wales
- Coordinates: 52.105°N 3.632°W
- Grid reference: SN883464
- Manager: Transport for Wales
- Platforms: 2

Other information
- Station code: LNW
- Classification: DfT category F2

History
- Opened: 1867

Passengers
- 2021/22: ▲2,746
- 2022/23: ▲3,992
- 2023/24: ▲4,954
- 2024/25: ▲5,300
- 2025/26: ▲5,462

Listed Building – Grade II
- Feature: Llanwrtyd Wells Station & North Platform
- Designated: 8 January 1988
- Reference no.: 7490
Location
Notes
- Passenger statistics from the Office of Rail and Road

Llanwrtyd railway station (also known as Llanwrtyd Wells railway station) serves the town of Llanwrtyd Wells, Powys, Wales. The station is on the Heart of Wales Line 53 1/2 miles (86 km) north east of Swansea. The railway station is located at street level at Station Road near the town centre. All trains serving the station are operated by Transport for Wales.

== History ==
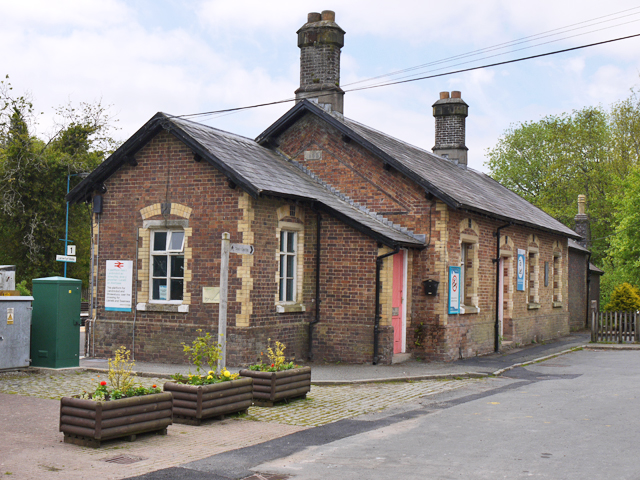
Station building on platform 2 (June 2013)

Opened by the LNWR on 6 May 1867, as part of the company's Central Wales Extension Railway project, it is the location of one of the route's five remaining passing loops. The loop points and associated indicators were replaced as part of a £5 million project by Network Rail to renew all five loops on the line in 2010.

== Facilities ==
The main buildings on the northbound platform still stand and whilst the station is now unstaffed (tickets must be bought on the train), a waiting room is not available within this building, a shelter near the main building is available. The main building is now run by Llanwrtyd Wells Community Transport (LWCT), who use it as a community centre and meeting rooms. A public phone and customer help point is available on this side, whilst the southbound platform has a waiting shelter only. Digital information screens and timetable posters provide train running details. Step-free access is available to both platforms, though the southbound one requires the use of a steeply inclined ramp.

== Services ==
There are five trains a day in each direction - southbound to Swansea and northbound to Shrewsbury from Monday to Saturday, and two services on Sundays. It is the crossover point where some northbound and southbound services meet (except on Sundays), and where train crews can swap between trains.

Preceding station	National Rail	Following station
Sugar Loaf	Transport for Wales; Heart of Wales Line	Llangammarch
