= Cilmeri railway station =

Railway station in Powys, Wales

Cilmeri
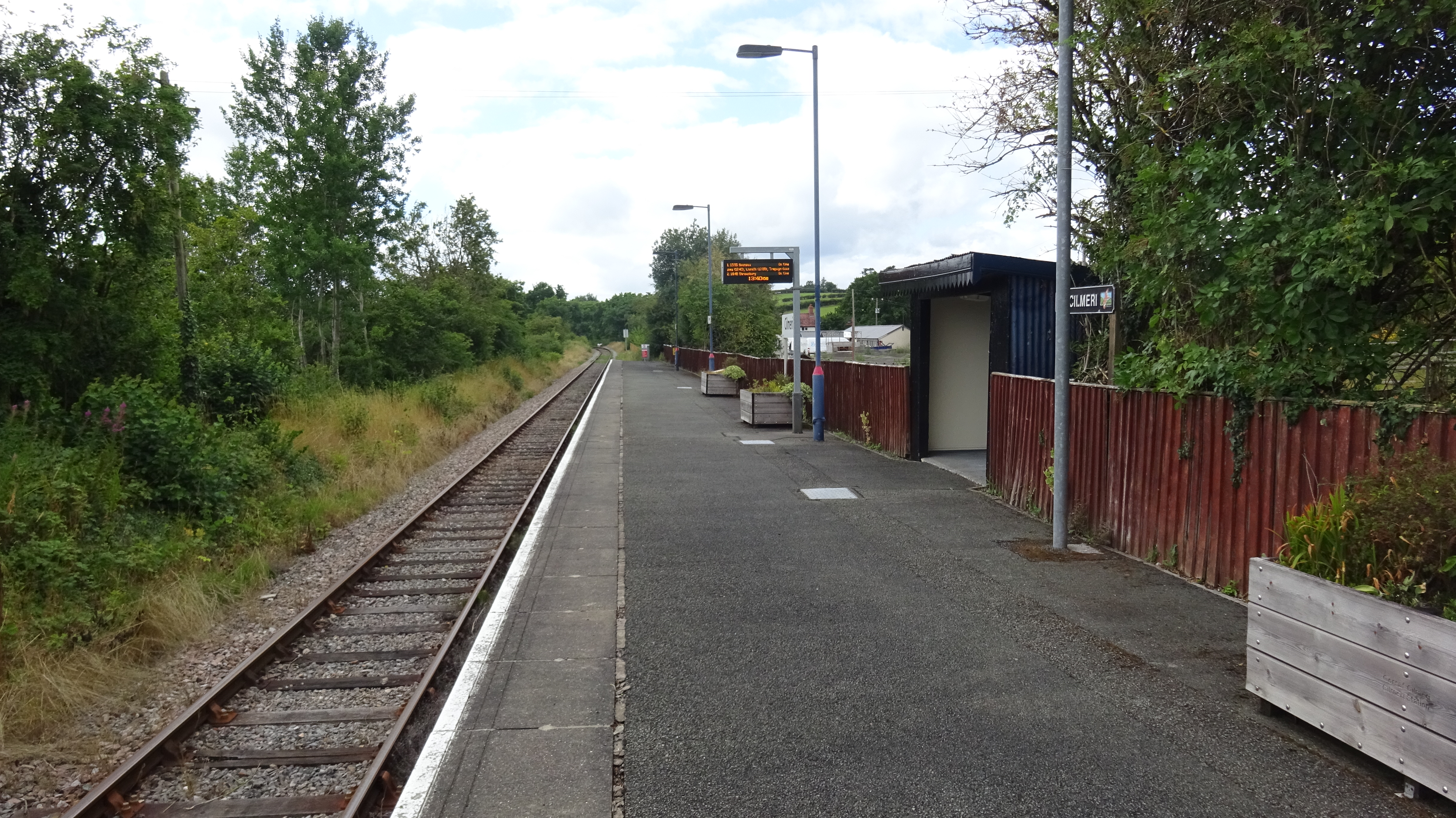

General information
- Location: Cilmery, Powys; Wales
- Coordinates: 52.151°N 3.457°W
- Grid reference: SO002511
- Manager: Transport for Wales
- Platforms: 1

Other information
- Station code: CIM
- Classification: DfT category F2

History
- Opened: 1867

Passengers
- 2021/22: ▲420
- 2022/23: ▲760
- 2023/24: ▲874
- 2024/25: ▲1,066
- 2025/26: ▼890
Location
Notes
- Passenger statistics from the Office of Rail and Road

Cilmeri railway station is a railway station serving the village of Cilmeri, in Powys, mid Wales. It is situated on the Heart of Wales Line 59 1/2 miles (95.8 km) southwest of Shrewsbury and was opened in 1867. The station is located in a rural setting just to the south of the A483.

== Facilities ==
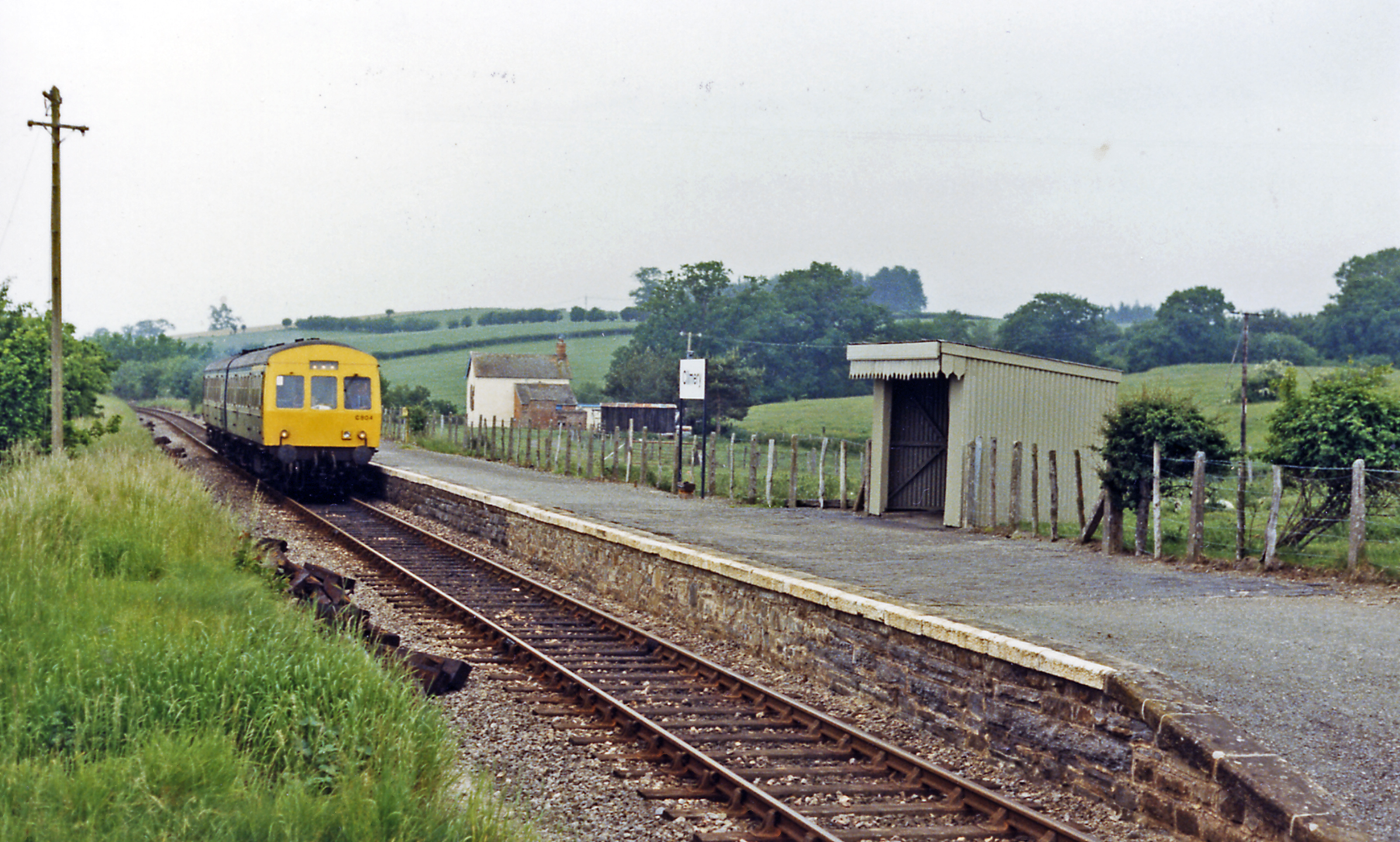
The station in 1986

The station is unstaffed (like almost all others on the line), with a single active platform and basic amenities (CIS display, help point and timetable information board). Step-free access is provided from the station entrance to the platform, though the access path is unmade and somewhat uneven.

== Services ==
All trains serving the station are operated by Transport for Wales. There are five trains a day in each direction from Monday to Saturday, and two services on Sundays.

Preceding station	National Rail	Following station
Garth	Transport for Wales; Heart of Wales Line	Builth Road
