= Floodway (road) =

Road that is subjected to flooding

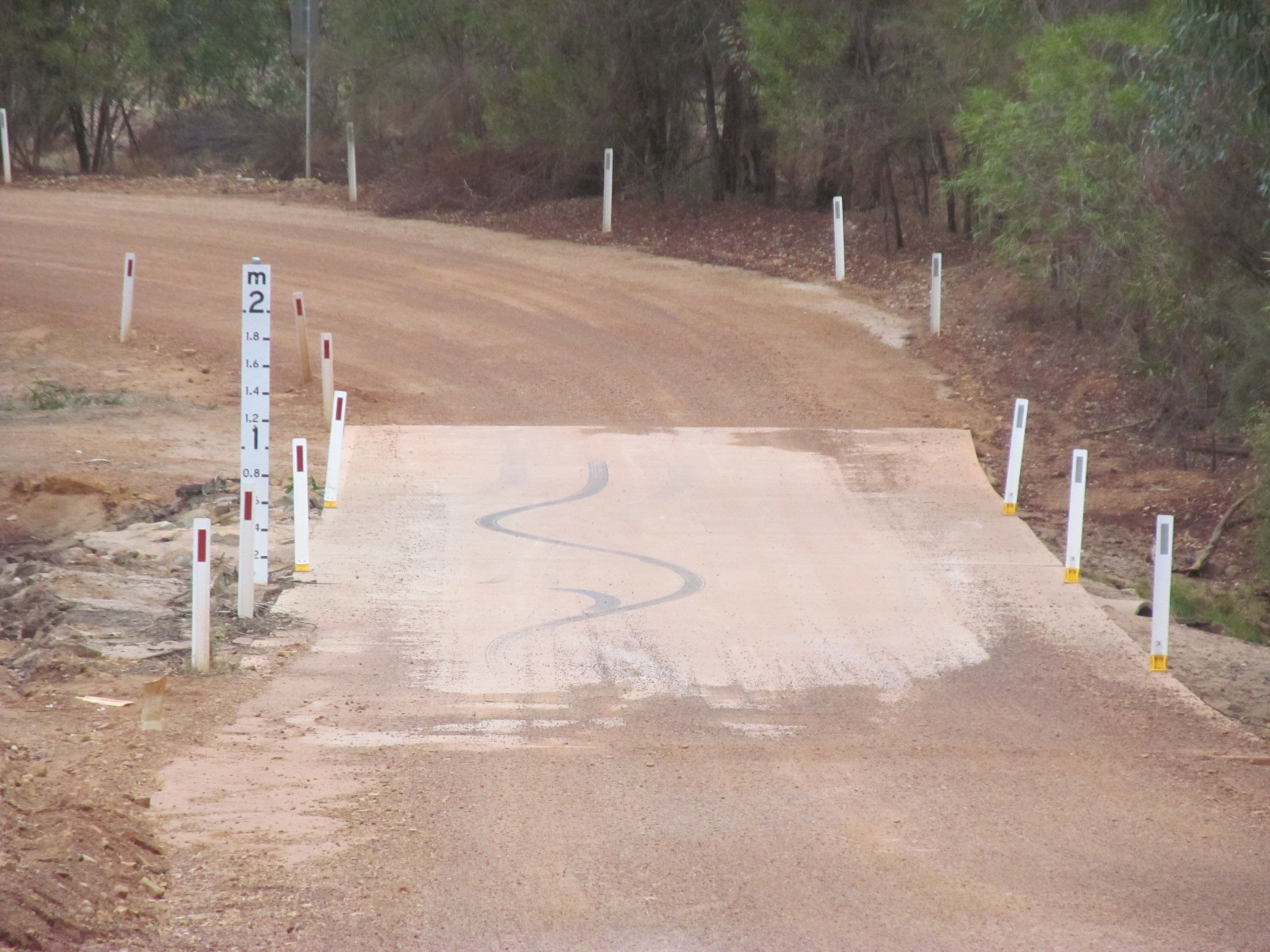
A floodway on a gravel road

A floodway is a flood plain crossing for a road, built at or close to the natural ground level. It is similar to a causeway, but crosses a shallow depression that is subject to flooding, rather than a waterway or tidal water.

They are designed to be submerged under water while withstanding such conditions. Typically floodways are used when the flood frequency or time span is minimal, traffic volumes are low, and the cost of a bridge is uneconomic – in most cases, in rural areas.

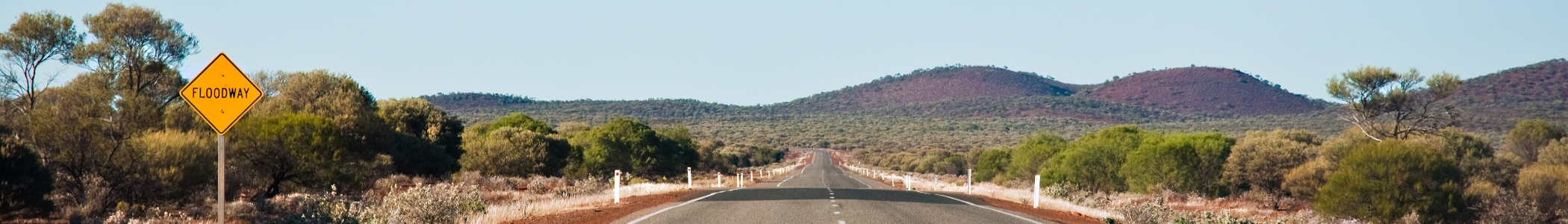
Floodway on Great Northern Highway, Western Australia

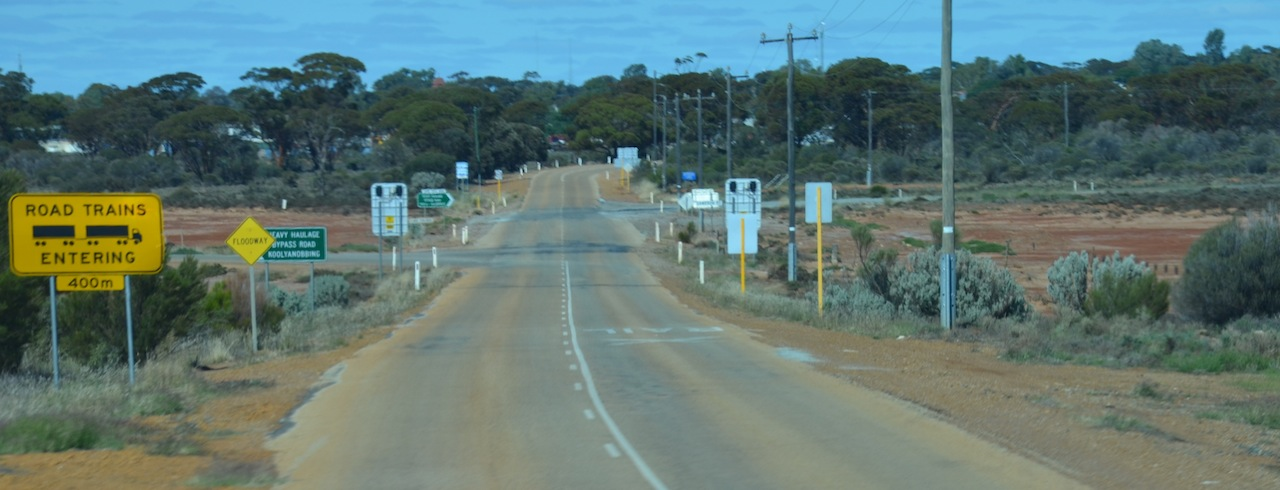
Floodway and signs, eastern side of Southern Cross, Western Australia

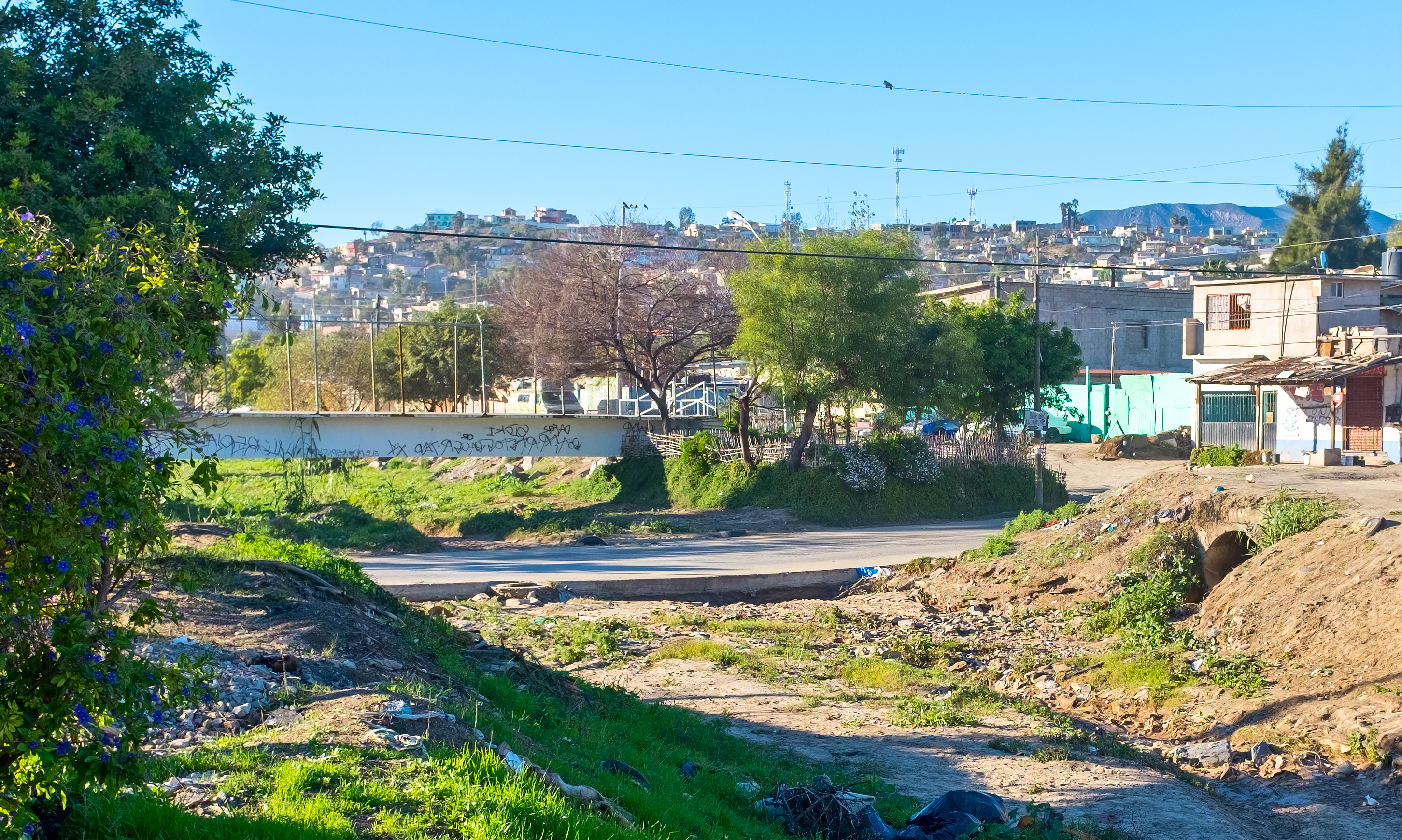
Floodway (road goes across the photo) in Baja California, Mexico. Note bridge behind it.

== See also ==
- Flood control channel
- Glossary of road transport terms
- Low water crossing

== Notes ==
- Department of Transport and Main Roads (March 2010). "Chapter 10 Floodway Design" (PDF). Road Drainage Manual. Queensland Government.
- Lokuge, Weena; Setunge, Sujeeva; Karunasena, Warna (2014). Investigating the performance of floodway in an extreme flood event (PDF). 1st International Conference on Infrastructure Failures and Consequences (ICFC 2014) 16–20 July 2014. Melbourne, Australia.
- Greene, I.; Lokuge, W.; Karunasena f, W. (2020). Floodway Design Process Revisted (PDF). 25th Australasian Conference on Mechanics of Structures and Materials (ACMSM25), 4–7 December 2018. Brisbane, Australia – via University of Southern Queensland.
