= Nant Irfon National Nature Reserve =

Protected area in Wales

Coordinates: 52.174°N 3.692°W

Nant Irfon National Nature Reserve is a national nature reserve located high in the hills above the Afon Irfon valley near the village of Abergwesyn in Powys, Wales. It is surrounded by vast moorlands and striking conifer forests. Its steep slopes and rocky crags are covered with oak woodland, which is some of the highest in Wales. In late spring, swathes of bluebells transform the woodland floor.
