= Konnyaku bridge =

Type of low-water crossing bridge in Japan

A konnyaku bridge (こんにゃく橋, konnyaku-bashi) is a low water crossing bridge in Japan, so named locally because of the way it seems to tremble underfoot like konnyaku (konjac) jelly. Several are even officially named "konnyaku bridge", and this type of bridge can be found throughout Japan.

During low tide a konnyaku bridge can be crossed, but during high tide the bridge girdle and pier are submerged by water, rendering it unusable. Moreover, many are unsafe because they are narrow, lack hand rails, or have fallen into disrepair. Hence many are slated for demolition and are being replaced by other kinds of bridge. Examples that have been demolished include the Moguri and Hamatakabō bridges.
