= Robin Kevan =

British environmentalist (born 1945)

Robin Kevan (born 8 April 1945), a retired social worker, is affectionately known as Rob the Rubbish in his home town of Llanwrtyd Wells, Powys, for voluntarily clearing litter from the town's streets each day.

== Environmental activism ==
He has become famous throughout the United Kingdom for his efforts to clean up the countryside, most notably on Ben Nevis in Scotland, Snowdon in Wales and Scafell Pike in England. It started with him quietly cleaning his own village of litter and went on from there. Slowly the media picked up on his efforts and he has been featured in numerous newspaper articles and TV and radio shows including the Richard & Judy Show on Channel 4, the BBC's Countryfile and the Jeremy Vine Show.

On 4 September 2006, The Daily Telegraph described Kevan as "the unlikely new hero of the environmental lobby". The Independent stated in one of its leaders in 2005 that "Mr Kevan thus follows in the footsteps of others who have decided something must be done and done it. One thinks of Florence Nightingale, Albert Schweitzer, Bob Geldof, Diana, Princess of Wales...". At the end of 2005, Stephen Jardine of the Edinburgh Evening News stated that Robin Kevan was his choice for Man of the Year and concluded: "Britain needs more people like Rob the Rubbish who recognise enough is enough and are prepared to take responsibility for doing something about it." In October 2006 he was taken on a trek to Mount Everest by Travel and Trek to clean up to the base camp of the world's highest mountain. In 2007 he appeared on the BBC's documentary series Mountain presented by Griff Rhys Jones in which it highlighted his work in cleaning up Snowdon in Wales. In the book which accompanied the series Jones said, "Rob proved to be an unnervingly delightful chap. He disliked litter so he had put on a day-glo jacket, taken up his claw stick and, like some medieval holy man, dedicated his life to wandering the wild places on behalf of us sinners. And he had a jacket for me too. It said, 'Griff the Garbage'".
