= Llangammarch railway station =

Railway station in Powys, Wales

Llangammarch
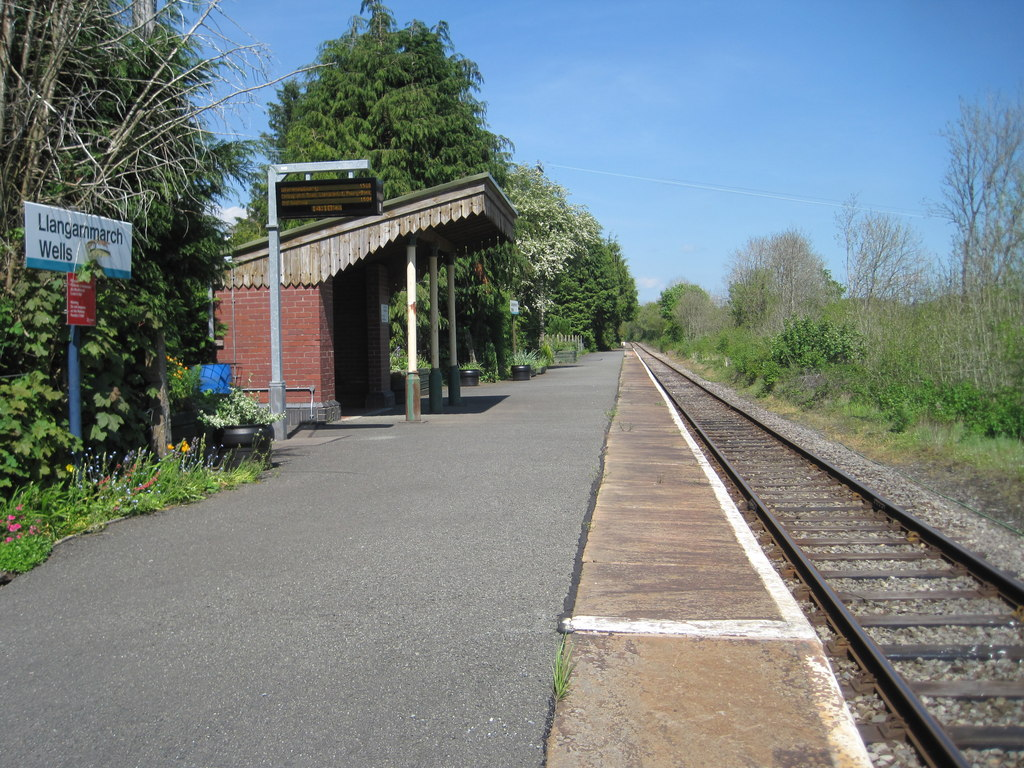

General information
- Location: Llangammarch Wells, Powys; Wales
- Coordinates: 52.114°N 3.555°W
- Grid reference: SN935473
- Manager: Transport for Wales
- Platforms: 1

Other information
- Station code: LLM
- Classification: DfT category F2

History
- Opened: 6 May 1867

Passengers
- 2021/22: ▲678
- 2022/23: ▲1,006
- 2023/24: ▲1,518
- 2024/25: ▲2,156
- 2025/26: ▼1,812
Location
Notes
- Passenger statistics from the Office of Rail and Road

Llangammarch railway station serves the village of Llangammarch Wells in Powys, Wales. Situated near the centre of the village, the station is on the Heart of Wales Line 56 3/4 miles (91.3 km) north east of Swansea.

== History ==
The station was opened in May 1867, as part of the second stage of the Central Wales Extension Railway's line from the Llandrindod Wells to Llandovery. This had been given parliamentary approval in 1860, but took until 1867 to reach Llanwrtyd and was not finally completed throughout until 1 June 1868. A single platform station was provided here, with booking office, waiting room and toilets located in the main building, a separate house for the station master and a simple goods shed served by a single siding.

Further south, the Neath and Brecon Railway obtained an act of parliament for a line from Sennybridge to Llangammarch; that railway's promoter, John Dickson, also made a start on constructing the interconnecting route, but work was suspended on his bankruptcy in 1867 and never resumed. The partially completed earthworks can still be seen in the countryside north of Sennybridge.

In 1870 the London and North Western Railway took over and the line subsequently became a well used through route between Shrewsbury and Swansea, with passenger trains from the station conveying through coaches to destinations as varied as Liverpool, Manchester, York, Birmingham New Street and London Euston. Llangammarch and the other towns in the area were also promoted by the LNWR for the healing properties of their mineral waters, leading to the addition of 'Wells' to the station name here (and elsewhere) in the 1880s and the construction of a company-owned hotel nearby (this still survives, though it is now a private house).

The station passed into the ownership of the London, Midland and Scottish Railway at the 1923 Grouping, then to the Western Region of British Railways upon nationalisation in January 1948. The station was host to a LMS caravan from 1934 to 1939. It was threatened with closure (along with the line) in 1962 and again in 1967, but survived on each occasion. It did however lose both its goods handling facilities and station staff in the summer of 1964, when through freight traffic ended and passenger services were converted to diesel operation. The main building remained intact (though in an increasingly dilapidated state) until 1980, when it was finally demolished and replaced by a basic wooden shelter. This in turn was replaced by the current (more substantial) structure in 1998.

== Facilities ==
The station has only basic amenities (brick and timber waiting shelter, timetable information board and bench seating) though it has been fitted with a digital CIS display and customer help point (like others on the line). Though listed at the National Rail Enquiries site as Llangammarch, the station name boards now include the "Wells" suffix.

== Services ==
All trains serving the station are operated by Transport for Wales. On Mondays to Saturdays there are five trains a day in each direction, northbound to Shrewsbury and southbound to Swansea, while on Sundays there are two services each way. Llangammarch is a request stop: passengers wishing to board a train here must signal to the driver; those wishing to alight must inform the train conductor.

Preceding station	National Rail	Following station
Llanwrtyd	Transport for Wales; Heart of Wales Line	Garth
