= Garth, Powys =

Village in Powys, mid Wales

Coordinates: 52.13419°N 3.53459°W

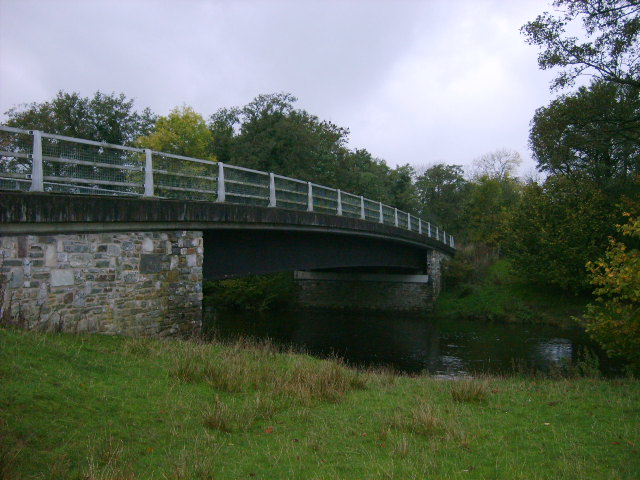
Gwarafog Bridge, crossing the River Irfon at Garth

Garth is a village in Powys, mid Wales, in the community of Treflys. It lies on the A483 road between Builth Wells and Beulah at the point where the B4519 joins it from the south. The River Irfon flows to the south of the village.

Garth railway station is a request station on the Heart of Wales Line.

== Notable residents ==
Garth was associated with the Gwynne family, which included Marmaduke Gwynne (1691–1769) and his daughter Sarah (1726–1822) who were early converts to Methodism. Sarah married Charles Wesley (1707–1788) at the nearby Llanlleonfel church in 1749.
