= Burning the Clocks =

Winter festival in Brighton, England

Coordinates: 50.8180°N 0.1295°W

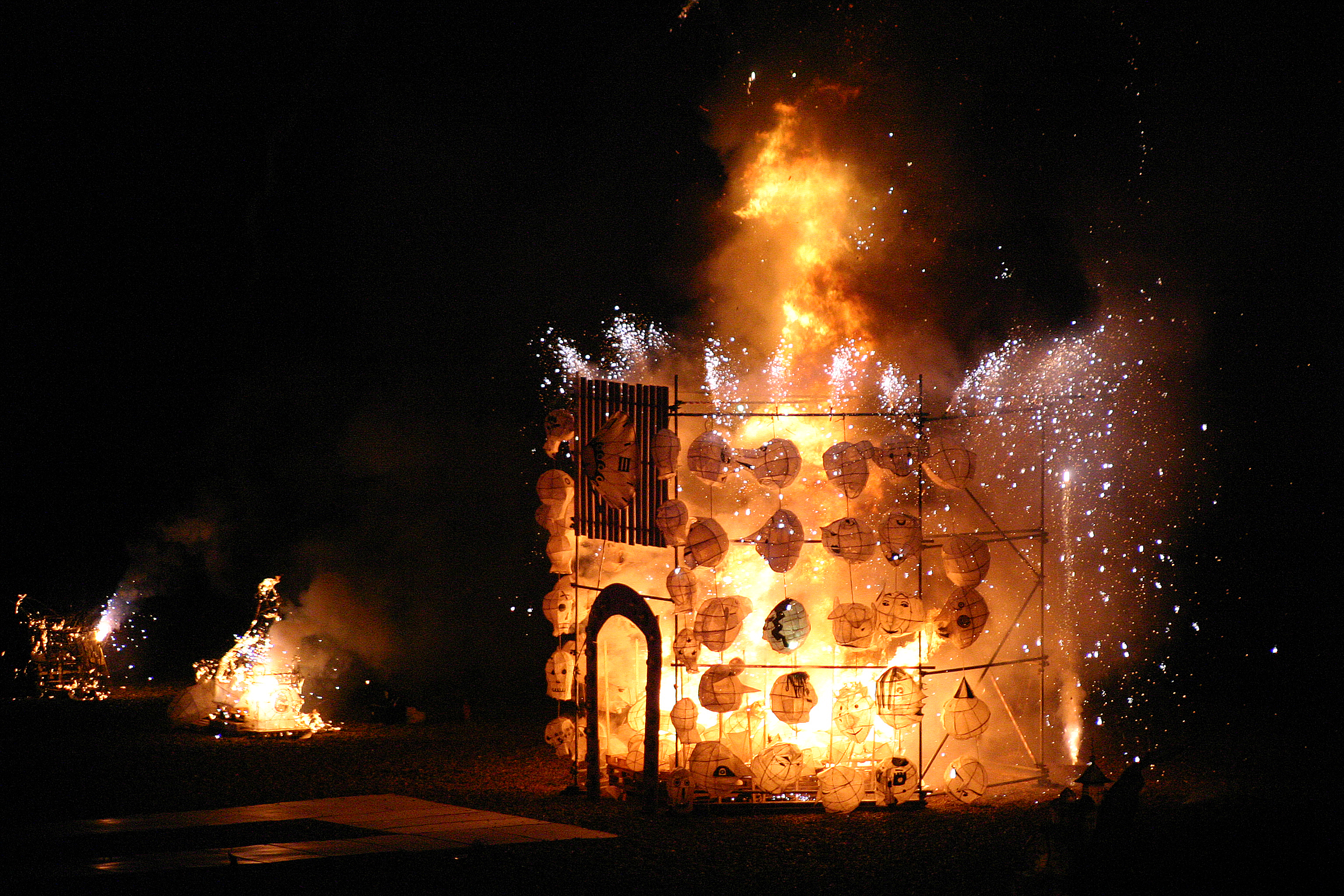
Lanterns being burned on the seafront in 2010

Burning the Clocks is a winter solstice festival that takes place each year in Brighton, England. It has taken place since 1994 as a response to Christmas commercialisation.

== The event ==
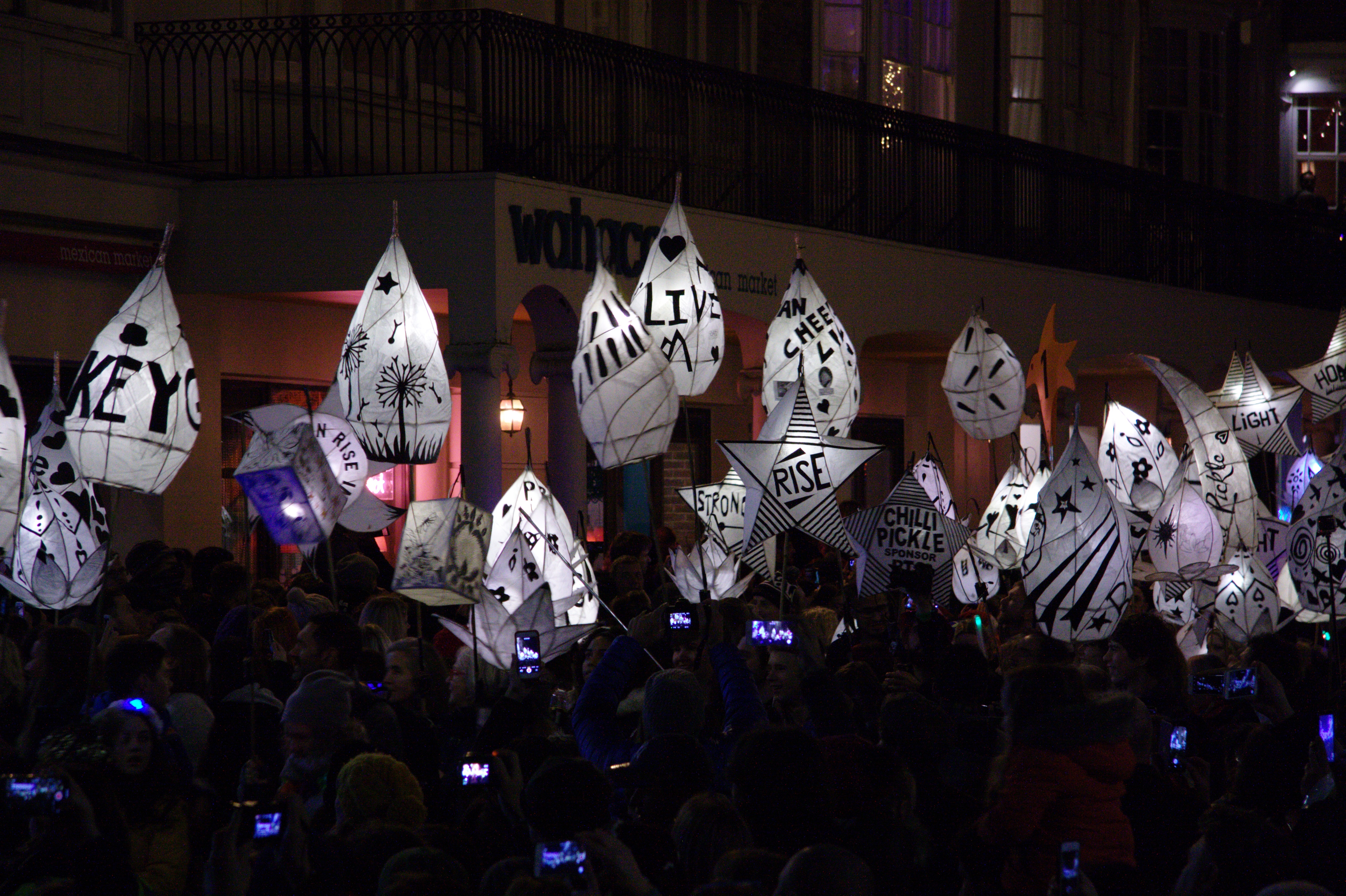
Lanterns being paraded through the streets of Brighton

Founded in 1993, the celebration is based on a procession of lanterns and costumes, made from withies (willow canes) and white tissue paper, led by local bands with a carnival atmosphere. The procession makes its way through Brighton city centre to the seafront where the festivities culminate in a lantern bonfire, accompanied by fireworks. The costumes all include a clockface to represent the passing of time, although each year has a slight change of theme.

Same Sky, an arts initiative, first organised the event with Brighton Co-op to commemorate the founding of the Co-operative Movement, 150 years before. Brighton Co-op provided the finance for the firework display and Same Sky organised local schools producing the lanterns for the parade. They explain:

"Burning the Clocks is an antidote to the excesses of the commercial Christmas. People gather together to make paper and willow lanterns to carry through their city and burn on the beach as a token for the end of the year ... The lantern makers become part of the show as they invest the lanterns with their wishes, hopes, and fears and then pass them into the fire. Same Sky [create] new urban rituals to replace those traditional festivals that were lost in the dash to be new and non-superstitious."

In 2000, Brighton Museum commissioned a costume from Same Sky artist Nikki Gunson. She created "Mother Time Keeper" and performed it in the parade before returning to the museum. Incidentally the festival took place on New Year's Eve' that year. Local colleges also participate; Sussex Downs College have been contributing since 1998.

The event was cancelled in 2009 due to snow and low temperatures making the streets and pavements of the city unsuitable for the processions and anticipated crowds, and in 2020 and 2021 due to the COVID-19 pandemic.

== Ethos ==
The Same Sky arts initiative describes the festival as "the giving and sharing of thoughts and wishes… and put them into a secular format that can be enjoyed by all regardless of faith or creed" and says that the intention is to "[create] new urban rituals to replace those traditional festivals that were lost in the dash to be new and non superstitious". Brighton newspaper The Argus argue that the event "[creates] new urban rituals to replace traditional festivals lost in the politically correct drive to be modern, secular and non-superstitious."
