= Stupid motorist law =

Arizona law regarding obvious hazards

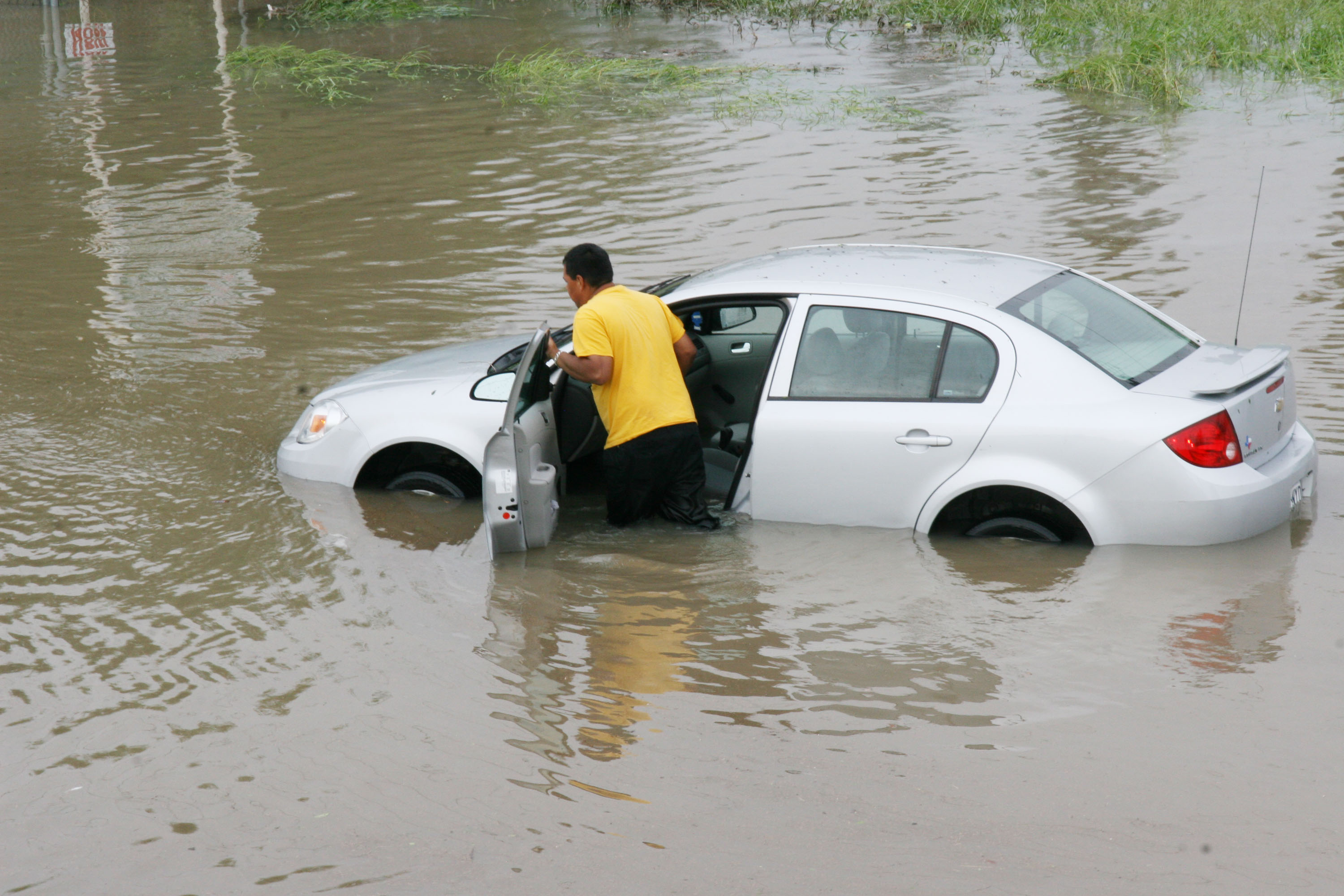
A motorist stranded in high water with his vehicle in flooding in 2008 in Brownsville Texas

The "stupid motorist law" is a law in the U.S. state of Arizona that states that any motorist who becomes stranded after driving around barricades to enter a flooded stretch of roadway may be charged for the cost of their rescue. The law corresponds to section 28-910 of the Arizona Revised Statutes.

If public emergency services (such as a fire department or paramedics) are called to rescue a flooded motorist and tow the vehicle out of danger in Arizona, the cost of those services can be billed to the motorist, plus additional liability of up to $2,000. Motorists are only liable if water already covers the road, barriers are in place but bypassed, and people are rescued from a vehicle. The 'stupid-motorist law' is not a chargeable statute; to be fined under the law, a motorist must commit at least one other violation.

Although the statute was enacted in 1995, only a handful of incidents had been prosecuted under ARS 28-910 as of 2015.

== Background ==
The need for the law came from the lack of storm sewers in the deserts of the Southwestern United States, combined with heavy rainfall in the desert, usually associated with the summer monsoon. These conditions can lead to flash floods in Arizona, which can unleash powerful torrents of water containing debris ranging in size from sand to boulders. The floods often resemble a concrete slurry due to their low water content; flows may contain as little as 20% water, while still moving at over 20 miles per hour (32 km/h). Only six inches (15 cm) of water is required to reach the bottom of most passenger cars, which can cause loss of control and possible stalling. Most passenger cars will float in just 12 inches (30 cm) of water, and 24 inches (61 cm) of water will sweep most vehicles (including SUVs and pick-ups) away.

== Documented incidents ==
In late July 2013, a tour bus carrying 33 people was swept up while traveling down a flooded road. The bus was carried 300 yards (270 m) before it was tipped on to its side. Occupants of the bus were able to escape to safety before rescue teams arrived. Because the area was under a flash flood warning at the time, the driver of the bus potentially faced charges under the stupid motorist law. This incident took place in northwestern Arizona in the small community of Dolan Springs.

== Statute ==
The law reads exactly:

28-910. Liability for emergency responses in flood areas; definitions

A. A driver of a vehicle who drives the vehicle on a public street or highway that is temporarily covered by a rise in water level, including groundwater or overflow of water, and that is barricaded because of flooding, is liable for the expenses of any emergency response that is required to remove from the public street or highway the driver or any passenger in the vehicle that becomes inoperable on the public street or highway or the vehicle that becomes inoperable on the public street or highway, or both.

B. A person convicted of violating section 28-693 for driving a vehicle into any area that is temporarily covered by a rise in water level, including groundwater or overflow of water, may be liable for expenses of any emergency response that is required to remove from the area the driver or any passenger in the vehicle that becomes inoperable in the area or the vehicle that becomes inoperable in the area, or both.

C. The expenses of an emergency response are a charge against the person liable for those expenses pursuant to subsection A or B of this section. The charge constitutes a debt of that person and may be collected proportionately by the public agencies, for-profit entities or not-for-profit entities that incurred the expenses. The person's liability for the expenses of an emergency response shall not exceed two thousand dollars for a single incident. The liability imposed under this section is in addition to and not in limitation of any other liability that may be imposed.

D. An insurance policy may exclude coverage for a person's liability for expenses of an emergency response under this section.

E. For the purposes of this section:

1. "Expenses of an emergency response" means reasonable costs directly incurred by public agencies, for-profit entities or not-for-profit entities that make an appropriate emergency response to an incident.

2. "Public agency" means this state and any city, county, municipal corporation, district or other public authority that is located in whole or in part in this state and that provides police, fire fighting, medical or other emergency services.

3. "Reasonable costs" includes the costs of providing police, fire fighting, rescue and emergency medical services at the scene of an incident and the salaries of the persons who respond to the incident but does not include charges assessed by an ambulance service that is regulated pursuant to title 36, chapter 21.1, article 2.
