= Garth railway station (Powys) =

Railway station in Powys, Wales

Garth (Powys)
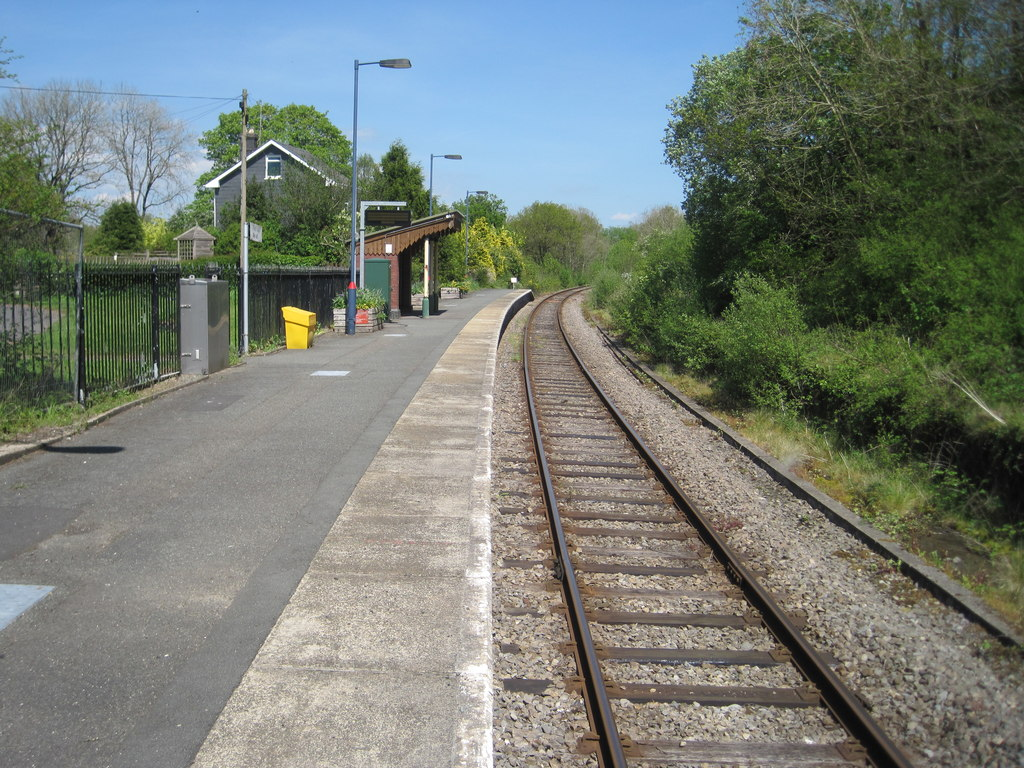

General information
- Location: Garth, Powys; Wales
- Coordinates: 52.133°N 3.530°W
- Grid reference: SN953494
- Manager: Transport for Wales
- Platforms: 1

Other information
- Station code: GTH
- Classification: DfT category F2

History
- Opened: 1868

Passengers
- 2021/22: ▲420
- 2022/23: ▲586
- 2023/24: ▲838
- 2024/25: ▲1,118
- 2025/26: ▲1,174
Location
Notes
- Passenger statistics from the Office of Rail and Road

Garth railway station (Powys) serves the village of Garth, Powys, Wales. The railway station is located at street level at the end of the Llais yr Afon lane near the village centre. The station is known as Garth (Powys) in order to differentiate it from Garth (Bridgend).

It formerly had a passing loop and two platforms, but only one is now used (the disused one is overgrown but still visible).

== Facilities ==
The facilities provided here are limited to a small brick waiting shelter, timetable poster board, digital CIS display and a customer help point. No ticketing provision is available, so passengers must buy in advance of travel or on board the train.

== Services ==
All trains serving the station are operated by Transport for Wales. There are five trains a day in each direction from Monday to Saturday, and two services on Sundays. This is a request stop, whereby passengers have to signal to the driver to board or alight from the train.

Preceding station	National Rail	Following station
Llangammarch	Transport for Wales; Heart of Wales Line	Cilmeri
