= Afon Irfon =

River in Powys, Wales

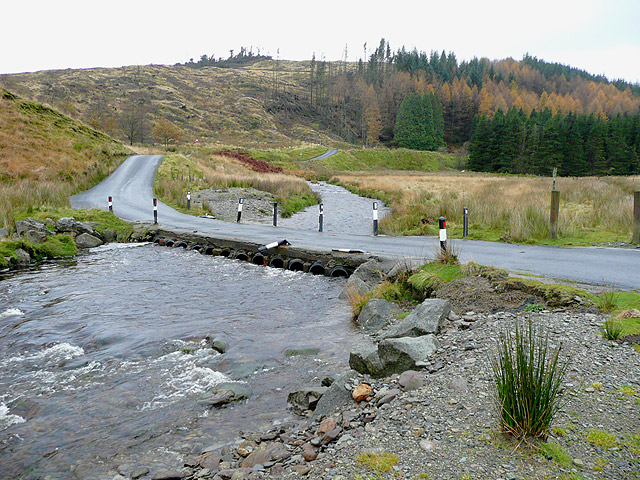
- The drovers' road to Tregaron crosses the Afon Irfon via the Irish bridge at the foot of the 'Devil's Staircase'

- Location within Wales

Location
- Country: Wales
- County: Powys

Physical characteristics
- Source: Desert of Wales
  - location: Bryn Garw, Cambrian Mountains
  - coordinates: 52.237°N 3.715°W
  - elevation: 540 m (1,770 ft)
- Mouth: River Wye
  - location: Builth Wells
- Length: 28 mi (45 km)

Afon Irfon (the River Irfon) is a river in Powys, Wales. It flows from the upper slopes of Bryn Garw in the Cambrian Mountains, through the Abergwesyn Valley, past the Nant Irfon National Nature Reserve in the hills above the village of Abergwesyn, and through Llanwrtyd Wells to its confluence with the River Wye at Builth Wells. The source of the Irfon is in the so-called 'Desert of Wales'.

Afon Irfon is the listed name of the Site of Special Scientific Interest in the upper reaches of the river Irfon Powys, Wales.

== Description ==
From its source at 540 metres (1,770 feet) AMSL on the upper slopes of Bryn Garw in the Cambrian Mountains the Irfon flows southwards past the foot of the Devil's Staircase, along the Abergwesyn Valley, through the scenic Camddwr Bleiddiad (Wolves' Gorge), and into the Wolves' Pool. It then flows past a forest of sessile oak (Quercus petraea) to join the Afon Gwesyn at Abergwyesn where it passes beneath the Irfon Forest and the Nant Irfon National Nature Reserve towards Llanwrtyd Wells. Lastly, overlooked by the scarp of Mynydd Epynt to the south, it flows eastward through Llangammarch Wells, and Garth to join the River Wye at Builth Wells (Llanfair ym Muallt) approximately 28 winding miles from its source.

The name 'Irfon' may be identical in its origin to the River Irvine in Scotland, for which multiple etymologies have been proposed.

== History ==
The river is famous in Welsh history for the fact that it was on its banks, in the vicinity Cilmeri, that Llywelyn ap Gruffudd, Prince of Wales, was killed on 11 December 1282.

== Literature ==
The Abergwesyn Valley and the legend of the boy failing to safely leap the Wolves' Gorge ('Camddwr Bleiddiad') were described by George Borrow in his 1862 travel publication Wild Wales: Its People, Language and Scenery.

== Gallery ==
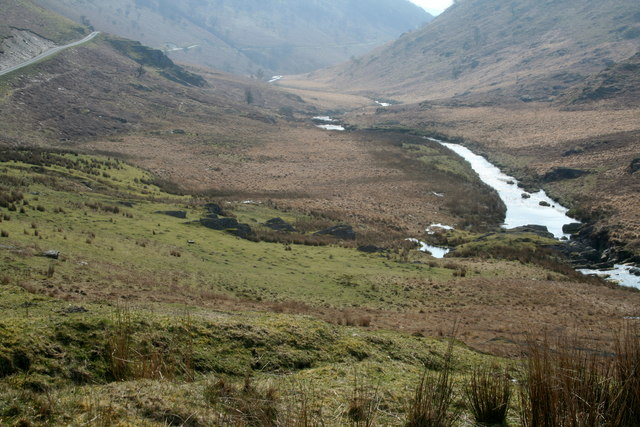
The Irfon flowing down the Abergwesyn Valley, dropping into the 'Wolves' Gorge' in the middle-ground of the picture

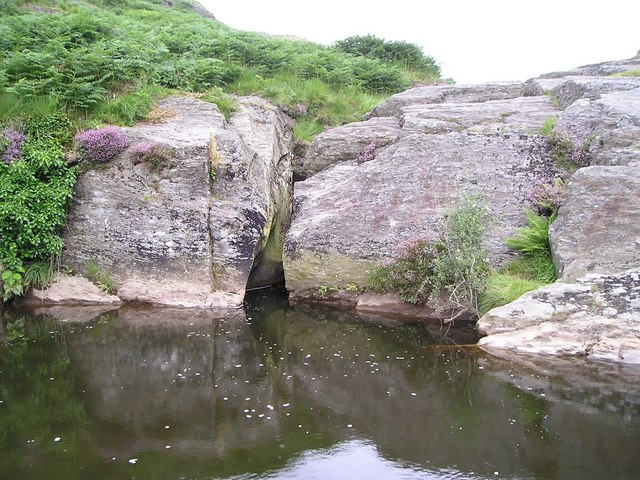
Afon Irfon flows through the narrow Wolves' Gorge into the Wolves' Pool in the Abergwesyn Valley

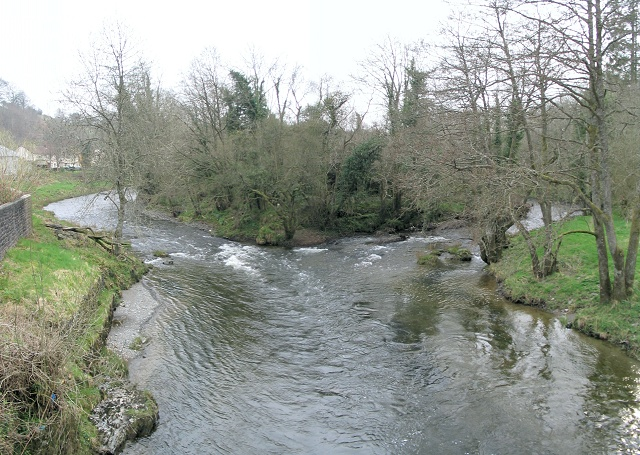
Afon Irfon at Llangammarch Wells

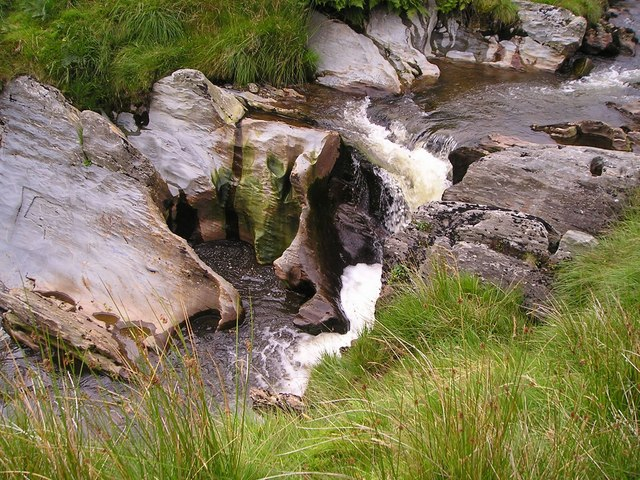
Wolves' Gorge

== See also ==
- List of Sites of Special Scientific Interest in Brecknock
