= Llangammarch Wells =

Coordinates: 52.11371°N 3.55816°W

Llangammarch Wells: Welsh: Llangamarch
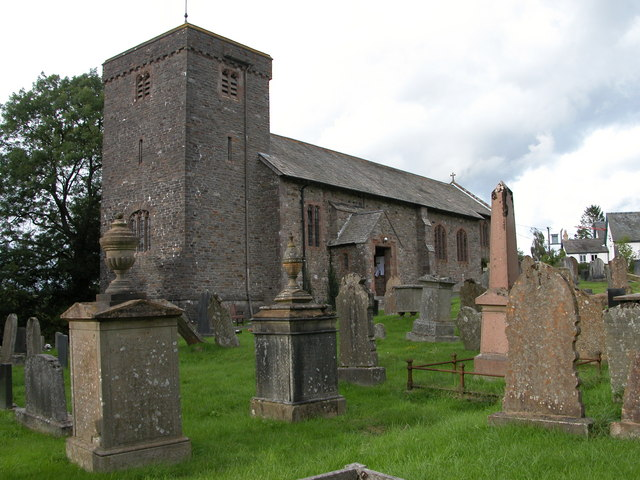
- Church of St Cadmarch
- Population: 541 (2011)
- OS grid reference: SN934473
- Community: Llangamarch
- Principal area: Powys
- Preserved county: Powys
- Country: Wales
- Sovereign state: United Kingdom
- Post town: LLANGAMMARCH WELLS
- Postcode district: LD4
- Dialling code: 01591
- Police: Dyfed-Powys
- Fire: Mid and West Wales
- Ambulance: Welsh
- UK Parliament: Brecon, Radnor and Cwm Tawe
- Senedd Cymru – Welsh Parliament: Brecon & Radnorshire
- Website: llangammarch-cc.gov.wales
- List of places UK Wales Powys Community map: Map of the community

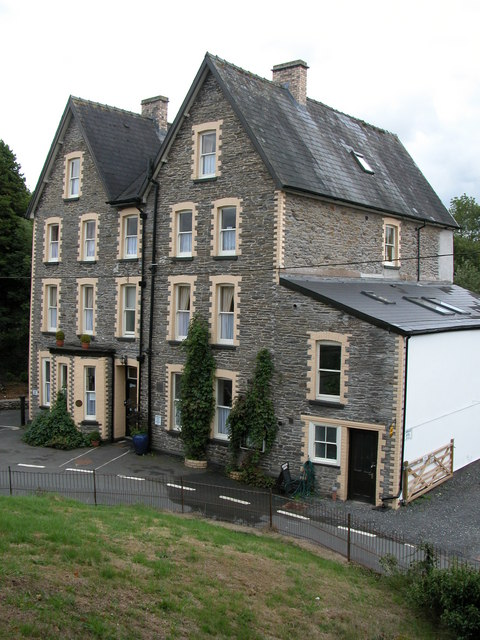
The Cammarch Hotel

Llangammarch Wells, or simply Llangammarch (Welsh: Llangamarch), is a village and community in Powys (formerly Breconshire and the historic county of Brecknockshire), Mid Wales, which lies on the Afon Irfon.

It is the smallest of the four spa villages of mid-Wales, alongside Llandrindod Wells, Builth Wells and Llanwrtyd Wells. The spa was focused on a barium well, which is now closed. The old village is centred on the parish church of St Cadmarch, a Grade II* listed building in Powys. The church graveyard contains the grave of Theophilus Evans, a former vicar of the church, to which was added, at his own request, the mortal remains of his grandson, Theophilus Jones (historian), the noted historian of Brecknockshire, who wrote the two-volume History of the County of Brecknock (1805-1809) and other works. Jones wrote about 'Llangamarch or Llangammarch' in Volume One of his History.

Llangammarch station is on the Heart of Wales Line with trains provided by Transport for Wales. It lies on National Cycle Route 43 of the National Cycle Network.

Llangammarch Wells Golf Club (now defunct) was founded in 1904. The club and course disappeared in the 1950s.

The community includes the small settlements of Tirabad and Cefn Gorwydd, birthplace of John Penry (1563–1593) the martyr, who was born at Cefn Brith farm. The farmhouse is not the original building.

== Governance ==
For elections to Powys County Council, Llangamarch is covered by the Llanwrtyd Wells electoral ward.

== Notable people ==
- Theophilus Evans (1693-1767}, a clergyman and historian.
- Thomas Howell (1588–1650), clergyman and Bishop of Bristol from 1644 to 1646.
- T. Harri Jones (1921–1965), a Welsh poet and university lecturer, commemorated by a statue in the town.
- John Penry (1563–1593), executed for high treason during the reign of Queen Elizabeth I, a Protestant Separatist martyr.
