= Beulah, Powys =

Coordinates: 52.148704°N 3.578797°W

Beulah
- Location within Powys
- OS grid reference: SN 9207 5122
  - Cardiff: 49 mi (79 km)
  - London: 154 mi (248 km)
- Community: Treflys
- Principal area: Powys
- Country: Wales
- Sovereign state: United Kingdom
- Post town: LLANWRTYD WELLS
- Postcode district: LD5
- Dialling code: 01591
- Police: Dyfed-Powys
- Fire: Mid and West Wales
- Ambulance: Welsh
- UK Parliament: Brecon, Radnor and Cwm Tawe
- Senedd Cymru – Welsh Parliament: Brecon and Radnorshire

Beulah is a village in southern Powys, Wales, in the community of Treflys, lying on the Afon Cammarch. The village sits astride the main A483 road about 8 miles (13 km) south-west of Builth Wells and is 49 miles (79 km) from Cardiff and 154 miles (248 km) from London.

It benefits from both a pub and service station with attached shop. The parish church Eglwys Oen Duw ("Lamb of God"), built in 1867, can be found one mile (1.6 km) to the north-west of the village.
