= Abergwesyn =

Village in Powys, Wales

Coordinates: 52°09′32″N 3°40′38″W

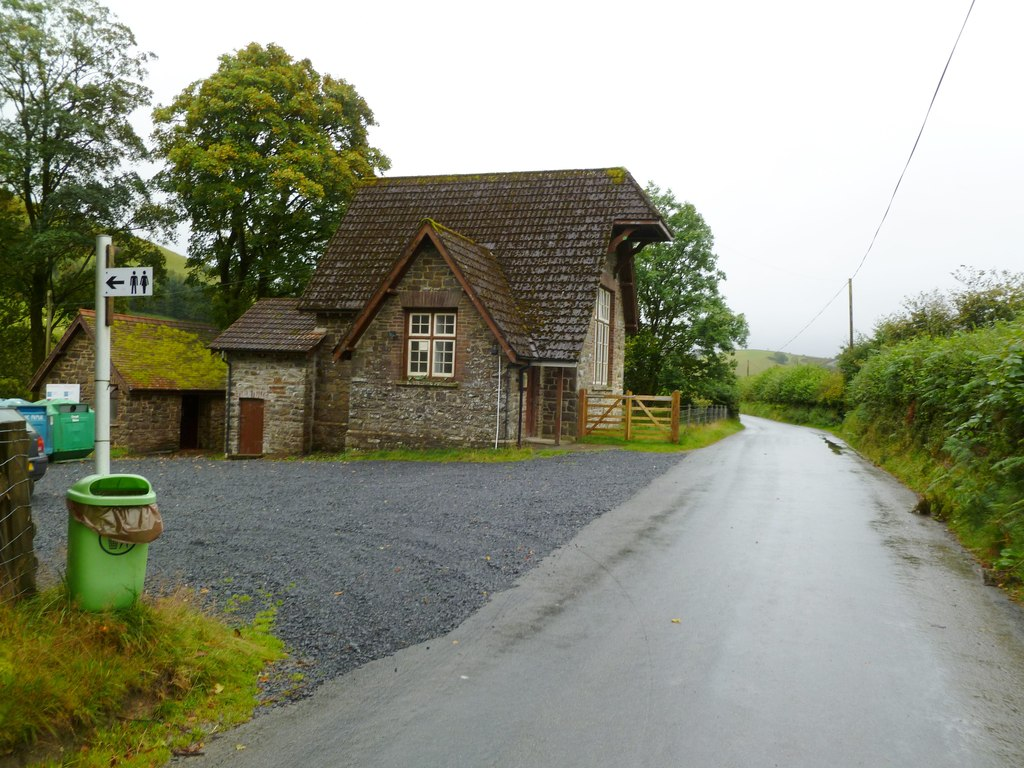
Village Hall, 2011

Abergwesyn (Welsh pronunciation) is a village in the Welsh county of Powys, in mid-Wales, at the start of the Abergwesyn valley and at the confluence of the Afon Irfon and the Afon Gwesyn. It is 52 miles (84 km) from Cardiff and 158 miles (254 km) from London.

Abergwesyn Commons stretch between the Nant Irfon valley and Llanwrthwl. They are rich in archaeology, including Bronze Age ritual sites and deserted medieval villages. A National Trust project is focused on the preservation of the peatland.

== Abergwesyn Commons ==
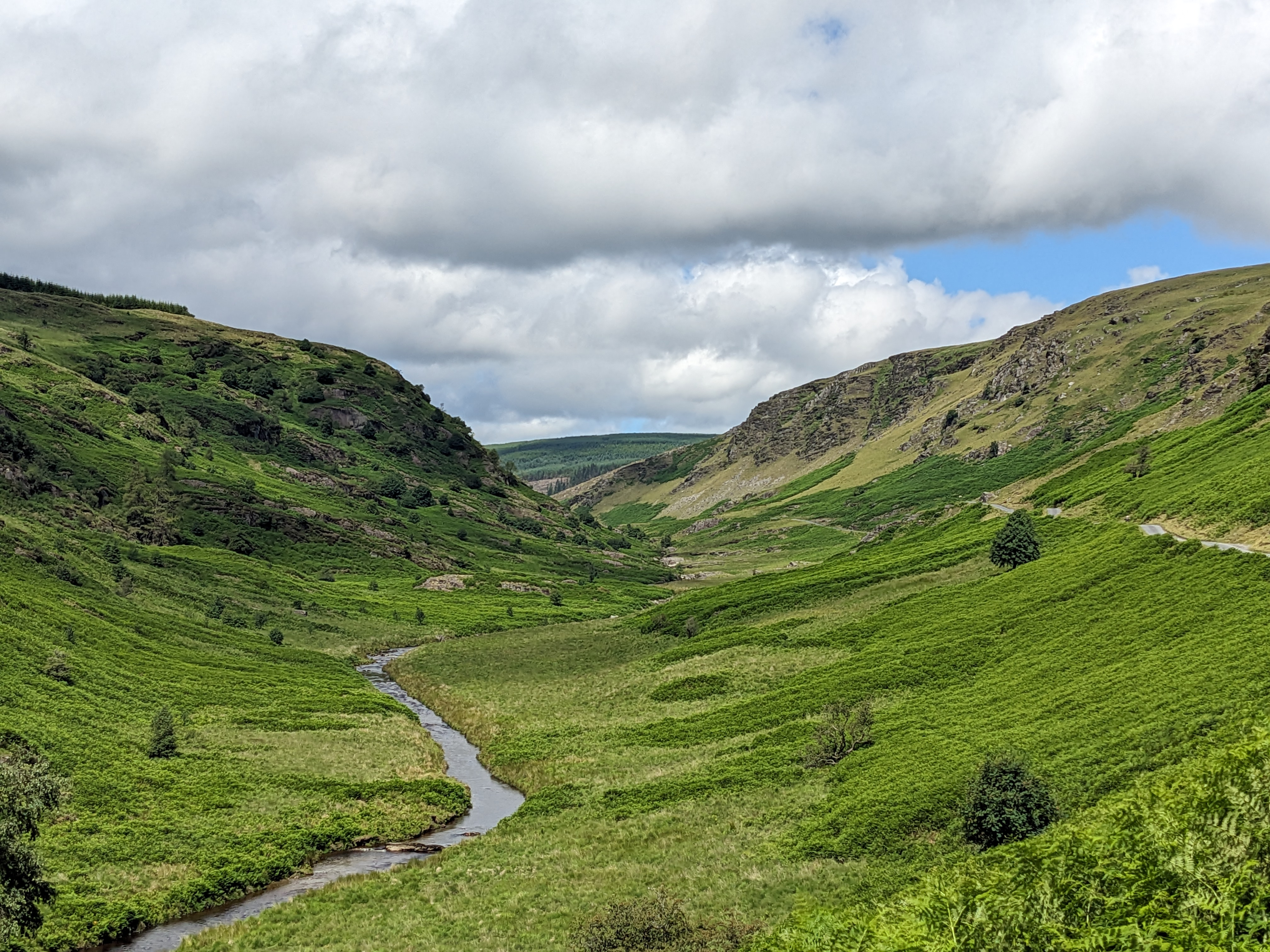
Abergwesyn Common, looking north-west

Abergwesyn Commons cover an area of some 16,500 acres (6,700 ha) and stretch for 12 miles (19 km) between the Nant Irfon valley in the west and Llanwrthwl in the east, are rich in archaeology, including Bronze Age ritual sites and deserted medieval villages. There are many cairns and other evidence of ancient human activity. To the north the ground falls away to the edge of the Elan Valley Reservoirs. The summit ridge is wild and bleak with expansive views across the roof of Wales. Among the wildlife to be seen are red grouse, northern lapwing and red kite.

== National Trust ==
The National Trust has an ongoing ecology project, centred on the preservation of peatland in the 16,500 acres (6,700 ha) Abergwesyn Commons. The site has extensive areas of deep peat and blanket bog in poor condition due to past overgrazing and burning. The work done has benefited the golden plover, an amber-listed species on the Birds of Conservation Concern index.

== Church and chapel ==
Originally a chapel of ease to Llangammarch Wells, St David's later became a parish church, but was last used as such in the mid-19th century. It stands within the remnants of a churchyard and is linked to Dewi's Well (a holy well or fount).

In 1740 the curate in the parishes of Llanwrtyd, Llanfihangel Abergwesyn and Llanddewi Abergwesyn, was Wales' most famous hymn-writer William Williams Pantycelyn (1717–1791). Llanddewi Abergwesyn parish was united with Llanfihangel Abergwesyn parish in 1885, and separate marriage registers were not kept thereafter. Parish registers are held, at the National Library of Wales and/or Powys Archives for baptisms 1813–1984, marriages 1813–1873, burials 1813-1986 and banns 1826-1862 and 1957–1959. Also, at Cardiff Central Library and NLW, are records of baptisms 1738–1812, marriages 1738-56 and 1765–1812, and burials 1738–1812. Bishops' Transcripts, for various periods, are also held at NLW.

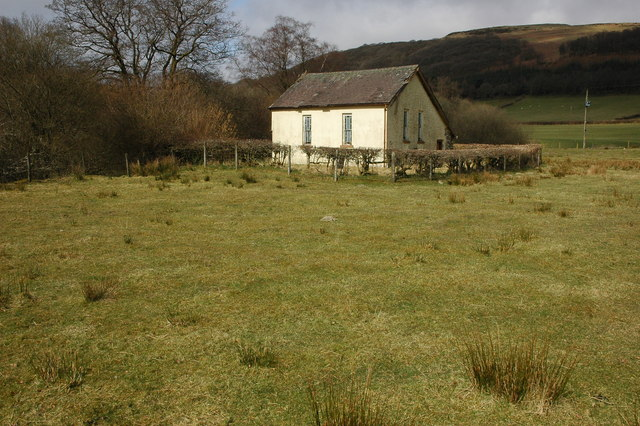
Moriah Welsh Independent Chapel, built 1828, rebuilt 1867

The Moriah Welsh Independent Chapel, initially constructed in 1828 and later rebuilt in 1867, is characterized by its whitewashed stone construction and follows the vernacular architectural style. It is entered through a gabled porch and contains a platform pulpit dating from the late 19th century. The pulpit end of the chapel and the opposite side have two rectangular sash windows; each of these have late 19th-century coloured border glazing. Although the chapel remained in use as of 2001, it had ceased operations by 2010.

== Other Landmarks ==
=== ROC Bunker ===
The village was the location for a small Royal Observer Corps Monitoring Bunker between 1961 and 1968, It remains mostly intact.

== See also ==
- Desert of Wales
