= Craig y Cilau =

Mountain in Powys, Wales

Coordinates: 51.8374°N 3.1816°W

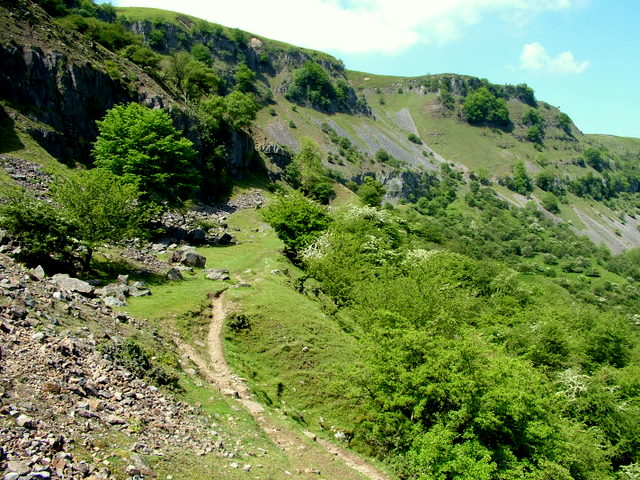
Part of Craig y Cilau

Craig y Cilau is a limestone escarpment in the Brecon Beacons National Park in Powys, Wales. The name translates from Welsh as crag of the nooks.

It was declared a national nature reserve in 1959 because of its importance for wildlife, particularly plants. It is situated on the north side of Mynydd Llangatwg in Llangattock community, about 2 miles (3.2 km) south-west of Crickhowell. The site was identified as early as 1915 by the Society for the Promotion of Nature Reserves as one of just under 300 wildlife sites in Britain and Ireland worthy of protection.

The reserve covers 157 acres (0.64 km^{2}) and has a varied geology with Old Red Sandstone below the cliffs and Twrch Sandstone above them. The range of habitats is equally wide with woodland and scrub in the lower parts and moorland higher up. There are numerous caves and disused quarries along the escarpment.

The limestone cliffs are home to many scarce plants including angular solomon’s-seal (Polygonatum odoratum), hutchinsia (Hornungia petraea) and the most southerly British population of alpine enchanter's nightshade (Circaea alpina). Five species of whitebeam occur including the narrow-leaved whitebeam (Sorbus leptophylla) and lesser whitebeam (Sorbus minima) which are endemic to Wales.

About 50 species of bird breed on the reserve including ring ouzel and raven on the cliffs and redstart, wood warbler and pied flycatcher in the woods. One of the caves, Agen Allwedd, holds a roost of lesser horseshoe bats during the winter months.
