= Pritzel =

Pritzel is a German-language surname. Notable people with the surname include:

- Ernst Georg Pritzel (1875–1946), German botanist
- Georg August Pritzel (1815–1874), German librarian and botanical writer
- Lotte Pritzel (1887–1952), German costume designer and doll maker

== See also ==
- Pritzelago alpina otherwise Hornungia alpina
- Pritzelia otherwise Trachymene
- Pritzel's feather flower otherwise Verticordia pritzelii
- Hakea pritzelii
