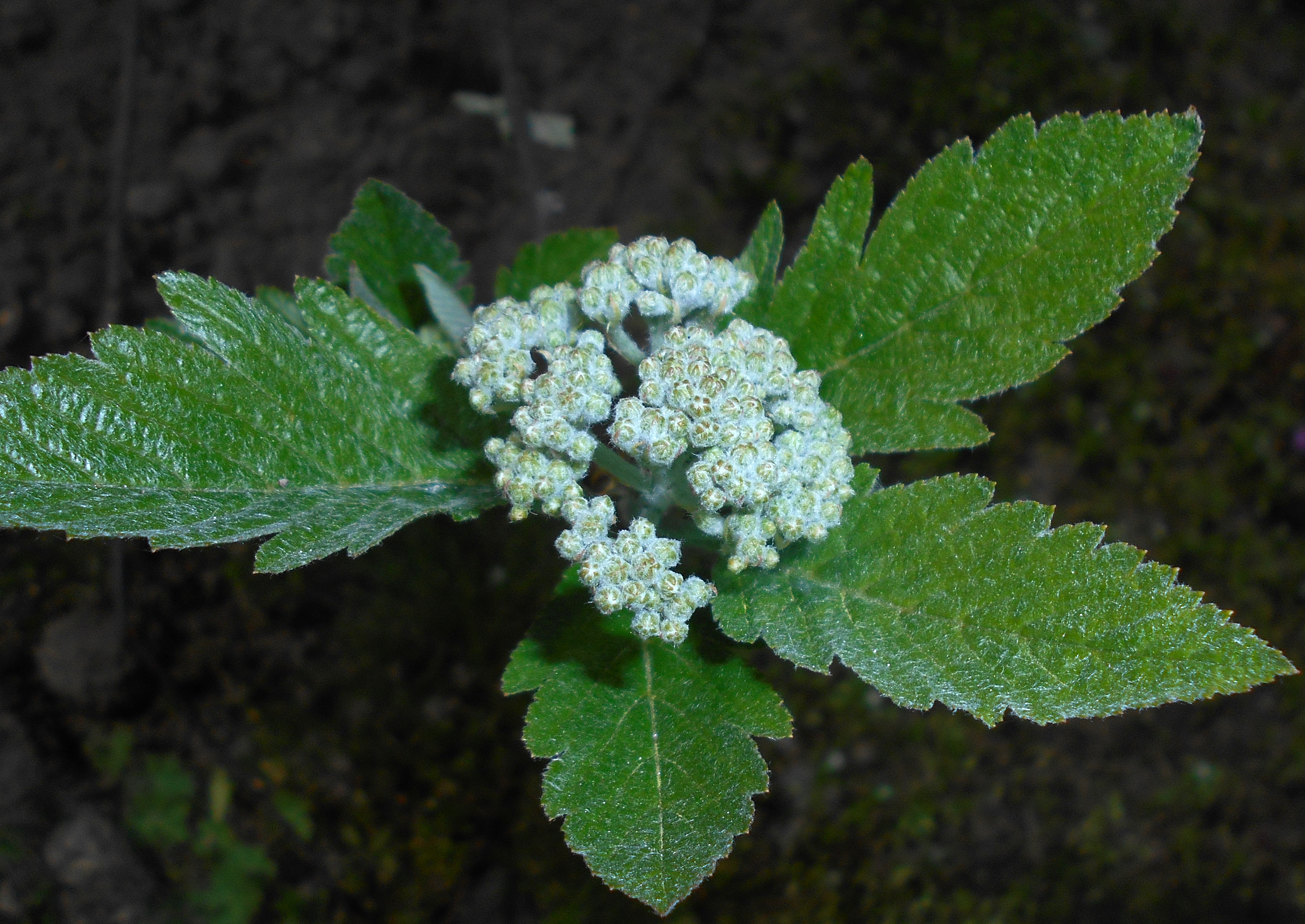

Conservation status
- Vulnerable (IUCN 3.1)

Scientific classification
- Kingdom: Plantae
- Clade: Tracheophytes
- Clade: Angiosperms
- Clade: Eudicots
- Clade: Rosids
- Order: Rosales
- Family: Rosaceae
- Genus: Hedlundia
- Species: H. minima

Binomial name
- Hedlundia minima (Ley) Hedl.

Synonyms
- Pyrus minima; Sorbus minima

= Hedlundia minima =

Species of shrub

Hedlundia minima, commonly known as the lesser whitebeam or least whitebeam, is a deciduous shrub in the rose family Rosaceae. It belongs to the genus Hedlundia, which includes species that have arisen from a hybridisation between members of the genus Sorbus (rowans) and members of genus Aria (whitebeams). It is an apomictic microspecies that reproduces only asexually, and is endemic to Wales.

== Taxonomy and description ==
Lesser whitebeam probably originated as a hybrid between the rock whitebeam (A. rupicola) and the rowan (S. aucuparia). It was first discovered in 1893 by Augustin Ley, the vicar of Sellack in Herefordshire who travelled widely in Wales.

It is a slender, deciduous shrub which can reach three metres in height. The leaves are 6–8 centimetres long and are fairly narrow and oval in shape being 1.8–2.2 times as long as they are broad. They are acutely pointed at the tip and base, have 7–10 (usually 8 or 9) pairs of veins and are lobed one fifth to one third of the way to the midrib. The flowers are produced in May and June and their petals are 4 millimetres long and white. The red berries are 6–8 millimetres across with a few small lenticels.

== Distribution ==
Lesser whitebeam grows at a few sites in the traditional county of Breconshire, a part of modern Powys. It grows on Carboniferous Limestone cliffs near Crickhowell on the northern edge of Mynydd Llangatwg in the Brecon Beacons National Park. The largest population is at Craig y Cilau National Nature Reserve where, in September 2002, 730 plants were counted within the reserve with several more in surrounding areas. Smaller numbers grow further west at Cwm Cleisfer and a single plant remains at Craig y Castell. It formerly also occurred at Blaen Onneu.

== Status ==
In 1947 the species was endangered by British Army mortar practice in and around its habitat. By raising the issue in the House of Commons, and inducing War Secretary Frederick Bellenger to order the Army to pull out of the area, Tudor Watkins, Labour MP for Brecon and Radnorshire is credited with preserving the species from extinction.

The species has been affected by quarrying which has destroyed many plants and reduced the amount of available habitat. It can recolonize disused quarries but does not reach the same population density as at undisturbed sites. All the locations where the species grows, apart from Cwm Cleisfer, now have some kind of protection and a population is kept at the National Botanic Garden of Wales.

== Sources ==
- Ellis, R. G. (1983) Flowering Plants of Wales. National Museum of Wales, Cardiff.
- Rich T. C. G.; Motley G. S. & Kay, Q. O. N. (2005). "Population sizes of three rare Welsh endemic Sorbus species (Rosaceae)" (PDF). Watsonia. 25: 381–388.
- Stace, Clive A. (1997) New Flora of the British Isles. Cambridge University Press.
- Tutin, T. G. et al. (1968) Flora Europaea, Volume 2. Cambridge University Press.
