= Ellen Hutchins =

Irish botanist, writer and illustrator

- Born: 17 March 1785; Ballylickey House, Bantry Bay, County Cork, Ireland
- Died: 9 February 1815 (aged 29)
- Resting place: Bantry churchyard, County Cork, Ireland
- Citizenship: British, Irish
- Known for: Finding plants new to science, collections of specimens, plant identification, botanical drawings.
- Scientific career
- Fields: Botany especially algae, mosses, liverworts, and lichens
- Workplaces: County Cork, Ireland

Ellen Hutchins (17 March 1785 – 9 February 1815) was an early 19th C. Irish botanist. She specialised in seaweeds, lichens, mosses and liverworts. Hutchins is known for finding several plants new to science, identifying hundreds of species, and her extensive botanical illustrations in contemporary publications. Her ability to find specimens was renowned and her work informed that of leading botanists with whom she corresponded and shared specimens. In the 21st century, Hutchins' work continues to be valued because contrasts between the species she was able to collect and those present today in the same locations provide insights into the effects of agriculture and changing climate on biodiversity.

== Personal life ==
Ellen Hutchins was from Ballylickey, where her family had a small estate at the head of Bantry Bay, County Cork, Ireland. She was born 17 March 1785 at Ballylickey House, the second youngest surviving child of her parents. Her father, Thomas, was a magistrate who died when she was two years old, leaving his widow Elinor and six surviving children (from twenty-one). She was sent to school near Dublin, and while there, her health deteriorated. Dr Whitley Stokes, a family friend, took her under his and his wife's care in his house in Harcourt Street, Dublin. She regained her appetite and health, and also followed Stokes advice to take up natural history as a healthy hobby. Following her improved health, she returned to her family home to care for her mother and her disabled brother Thomas. In her correspondence with botanist Dawson Turner, Hutchins often describes her solitude and melancholy as a caretaker for her family in the country.

Her health declined again and by late 1812 she was seriously ill. She and her mother moved to Bandon in 1813 to receive medical care. After her mother died there in 1814, Hutchins moved back to Ardnagashel House, close to Ballylickey, to be cared for by her brother Arthur and his wife Matilda. She died on 9 February 1815 after a long illness in which she had been taking mercury for her liver. She was buried in the old Bantry churchyard. Her grave was unmarked, but a plaque was erected in 2002 by the Hutchins family in their private family burial ground. A public memorial was placed in the old Bantry (Garryvurcha) graveyard in 2015, the bicentenary of her death, by the National Committee for Commemorative Plaques in Science and Technology.

Hutchins wrote many letters to botanists and her brothers. She sometimes utilized a style of letter writing used to save postal charges called a crossed letter in which the page is turned sideways and writing is continued at right-angles to the first set of sentences. The collection of her letters has been a valuable resource of information about her life and botanical contributions.

== Botanical collecting and illustration ==
Hutchins focused on botany (Stokes' own specialism) and spent much time out of doors accompanied by the indoor occupations of identifying, recording and drawing the plants she collected. She studied plants, specialising in the Cryptogams such as mosses, liverworts, lichen, and seaweeds. Nearly all of her collecting was undertaken in the Bantry area and County Cork. The Lusitanian flora of West Cork was comparatively unknown at this time. She learnt quickly and clearly had a gift for plant identification, produced very detailed watercolour drawings, and meticulously prepared specimens. She sent samples to Stokes which he passed on to other botanists. Through Stokes she became acquainted with James Townsend Mackay, a curator at the Botanic Garden of Trinity College. He helped her in the classification of the plants she was collecting and she contributed to his Flora Hibernica. In 1807, Mackay sent her specimens to Dawson Turner a botanist in Great Yarmouth on the East Anglian coast of England, for his publication Fuci. Turner's 'thank you' note was the beginning of a seven-year correspondence and exchange of specimens and drawings. A selection of these letters has been published by the National Botanic Gardens Glasnevin, Dublin in 1999. Twenty four of the surviving letters between Hutchins and Turner during 1811 have been transcribed by Hutchins great-great-grandniece Madeline Hutchins and can be accessed online. This publication also reprints the list of nearly 1100 plants that she prepared between 1809 and 1812 at the request of Dawson Turner for "a complete catalogue of plants of all kinds that you have found in your neighbourhood".

During her searches for specimens she recorded over 400 vascular plant species, around 200 species of algae, 200 bryophytes and 200 lichens. Among the latter two groups she discovered several new species including Jubula hutchinsiae, Herberta hutchinsiae, Leiocolea bantriensis (Bantry Notchwort), the lichen Thelotrema isidiodes and three further species of lichen that are named after her. Differences between her species lists and later records from West Cork are also of interest since they help date the decline of some species caused by changes in agricultural practices as well as the arrival of invasive species from other parts of the world.

Her ability to find new plants, and the quality of her drawings and specimens drew admiration from the leading botanists of the day, and her work was featured in many publications. Although she never published under her own name, she was a major contributor to the new and developing plant sciences of her era. At first refusing to have her name associated with her finds, she soon relented. The later volumes of English Botany (1790–1814) from James Sowerby and James Edward Smith included descriptions of her discoveries. The latter wrote of her that "she could find almost anything". After her death Dawson Turner wrote "that botany had lost a votary as indefatigable as she was acute, and as successful as she was indefatigable." In William Hooker's liverwort monograph British Jungermanniae (1816), her name was more or less connected with nearly every rare species mentioned within it. Her rare finds included lichens and she contributed to Lewis Weston Dillwyn's work British Confervae (1802–09).

She was a keen gardener, and she tended plants including ones sent to her by Mackay, in a field at Ballylickey, known as Miss Ellen's Garden. She was at her happiest in the garden, or out in her little boat, gathering seaweeds, which she then brought home to classify and paint.

== Patronymic species ==
Many species have been named in her honor.

- Hutchinsia (now Hornungia) in the Brassicaceae. The common name "Hutchinsia" persists in the UK for Hornungia petraea C. Agardh.
- Lecania hutchinsiae
- Pertusaria hutchinsiae
- Enterographa hutchinsiae
- Cladophora hutchinsiae (Dillwyn) Kützing (= Conferva hutchinsiae Dillwyn)
- Dasya hutchinsiae Harvey
- Jubula hutchinsiae (common name Hutchins Hollywort)
- Ulota hutchinsiae (common name Hutchins' Pincushion)

In addition, the orange-coloured leafy liverwort Herbertus hutchinsiae (Juniper Prongwort) is named after her. It has been considered a subspecies of Herbertus aduncus as well as a species.

== Legacy ==
Her specimens, artwork and documents are in the most significant museum collections in the UK, Ireland and the USA. She bequeathed her collection of plant specimens to Dawson Turner and many are now in the Natural History Museum, London. Her drawings were given by her sister-in-law, Matilda, to Dawson Turner, and over two hundred of her drawings of seaweeds are now in the archives of the Royal Botanic Gardens, Kew, with some in store at Sheffield City Museum. Specimens and drawings that had been sent to leading botanists, and featured in their publications, went into their collections. These include collections at Trinity College, Dublin; the Linnean Society, London (Smith collection); and the New York Botanical Garden (William and Lynda Steere Herbarium). Her letters to Dawson Turner are in Trinity College, Cambridge; and Dawson Turner's letters to her are in Kew Botanical Gardens' library and archives. Kew also has letters from Mackay to Hutchins, and Trinity College Dublin has her letters to him.

An Ellen Hutchins Festival was held in and around Bantry in 2015 and this has now become an annual event.

An exhibition of her life and work was held in the School of Natural Sciences, Trinity College Dublin February – April 2017.

An exhibition about Hutchin's life and work was held in the Boole Library of University College Cork in 2018.

Ellen Hutchins (1785-1815) Botanist of Bantry Bay (2019) was written by Madeline Hutchins and designed by Jenny Dempsey about Hutchins' life including some of her illustrations and modern photographs of the area where she lived and studied.

An exhibition of her letters, drawings and botanical publications was held at Kew Gardens September to November 2019.

In 2020 the book A Quiet Tide by Marianne Lee was published. It was a fictional account of Hutchins' life.

In September 2022 the Environmental Research Institute at University College Cork renamed their building in honour of Ellen Hutchins. At the same time, the Ellen Hutchins Reading Room was unveiled, which contains archival material, pressed seaweed specimens, and books, letters and a drawing by Hutchins.
