= Llangattock (disambiguation) =

Llangattock may refer to:

== Places ==
- Llangattock, Powys (sometimes historically Llangattock-juxta-Crickhowell), a village near Crickhowell in the Brecon Beacons National Park
- Llangattock Lingoed, a village in northern Monmouthshire
- Llangattock-Vibon-Avel, a parish in northeast Monmouthshire
- Llangattock-juxta-Usk (or Llangattock nigh Usk), a parish south of Abergavenny
- Llangattock-juxta-Caerleon, a parish containing the village of Caerleon

== Landforms ==
- Llangattock Mountain, a hill in the Brecon Beacons National Park

== People ==
- Baron Llangattock
