= Hall of the Mountain King =

In the Hall of the Mountain King is an 1875 orchestral piece composed by Edvard Grieg.

In the Hall of the Mountain King or Hall of the Mountain King may also refer to:

== Geography ==
- Hall of the Mountain King, the largest chamber in the Ogof Craig a Ffynnon cave system in Wales
- Hall of the Mountain King, a cliff structure found at Bryce Canyon National Park in southwest Utah
- Hall of the Mountain King, an area of Kentucky's Bedquilt Cave, which also appears in Colossal Cave Adventure

== Books ==
- In the Hall of the Mountain King, a story by John Varley (author)
- Hall of the Mountain King, a novel by Judith Tarr

== Film and TV ==
- The Ash Lad: In the Hall of the Mountain King, a 2017 Norwegian fantasy adventure film
- La Maldicion de la Bestia, also known as Hall of the Mountain King, a 1975 Spanish horror movie-

== Music ==
- Hall of the Mountain King, a 1987 studio album by Savatage

== See also ==
- Hall of the Mountain Grill, a 1974 album by Hawkwind
