= Martyn Farr =

British cave diver

Martyn Farr (born Crickhowell, Wales, March 3, 1951) is a leading exploratory cave diver and caver, known for his record-breaking cave dives and the exploration of many miles of previously undiscovered underground passages (e.g. in Ogof y Daren Cilau and Noon's Hole). As an author and photographer, he has written many books on the subject of cave diving history and techniques and caving locations.

== Life and career ==
Farr began caving in 1961 and cave diving in 1971, and within 10 years had established a world record for underwater cave penetration in the Bahamas. He is noted within the cave diving community for his explorations in Wookey Hole in 1977 and 1982, and for completing the first traverse of Llangattock Mountain in Wales in 1986, the execution of which was a televised media event, being the longest and deepest caving through trip in the British Isles. In 1978, Farr also discovered the Pollatoomary cave in the Partry Mountains of the Republic of Ireland. In 2008, his student Artur Kozłowski explored this cave to a depth of 103 metres (338 ft), which made it the deepest known cave on the British Isles.

As well as running a cave diving training facility in South Wales, Farr is a regular contributor to diving magazines around the world. Farr has also acted as support diver in some of the world's most notable cave diving penetrations, including the British-led expedition to Pozo Azul in Spain in September 2010, which at 8.8 km (5.5 miles) of underwater travel is the world's longest cave diving penetration.

Farr is the author of The Darkness Beckons, regarded as the definitive book on the history of UK cave diving.

== Bibliography ==
- The Darkness Beckons - The History And Development Of Cave Diving (1980)
- The Great Caving Adventure (1984)
- Wookey: The Caves Beyond (1985)
- Darkworld - The Secrets Of Llangattock Mountain (1997)
- The Secret World Of Porth yr Ogof (1998)
- Dan yr Ogof: The Jewel Of Welsh Caves (1999)
- Underground Wales (2001)
- Diving In Darkness - Beneath Rock, Under Ice, Into Wrecks (2003)
- Hidden Realms (2023)

== See also ==
- Cave Diving Group – UK based cave diver training and certification agency
- Caving in the United Kingdom
