= Ogof Agen Allwedd =

Cave in Llangattock, Powys, Wales

Coordinates: 51.835723°N 3.180446°W

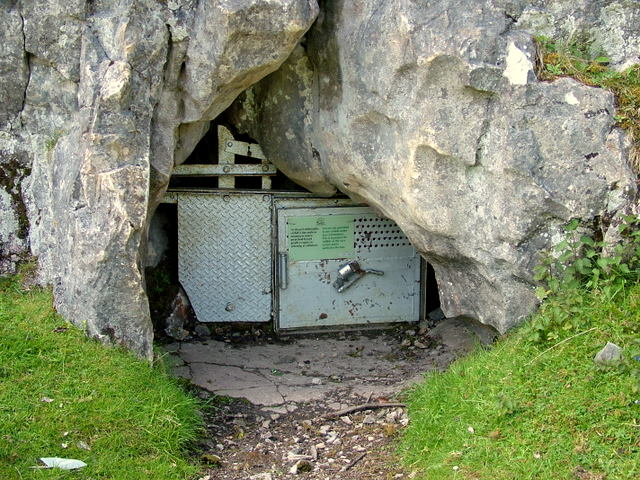
- The gated Ogof Gam entrance to Agen Allwedd cave.
- Interactive map of Ogof Agen Allwedd
- Location: Llangattock escarpment, Wales, United Kingdom
- Length: 20 miles (32.5 km)
- Discovery: Initial discovery 1949, breakthrough in 1957.
- Geology: Limestone
- Entrances: 1
- Hazards: Main streamway flood prone
- Access: Mynydd Llangatwg Cave Management Advisory Committee
- Translation: Keyhole Cave (Welsh)
- Cave survey: Chelsea Spelaeological Society
- Registry: Cambrian Cave Register

Ogof Agen Allwedd or Agen Allwedd, is, at 20.2 miles (32.5 km), one of the longest cave systems in Wales, and the longest cave system on the Llangattock escarpment.

== History ==
The cave was first investigated by Brian Price and party in 1949 and 1950, but it was not until 1957 that the Hereford Caving Club broke through the First Boulder Choke and found the main part of the cave. The cave system was further explored in 1971 by John Parker, J. Phillips and others who dived through sumps and extended the known length of the cave. Further exploration in 1973 by Martyn Farr and Roger Solari resulted in a fatality when Solari failed to return from a dive.

== The cave system ==
Ogof Agen Allwedd is the longest cave system on the Llangattock escarpment, with over 20.2 miles (32.5 km) of passages. There are several round trips that can be followed within the system, but all trips start via the short entrance series and first boulder choke. Crawling is required for the long entrance passages but most of the cave consists of large stream passages which provide easy caving and no specialist equipment is required.

The round trips include the Grand Circle – along Main Stream Passage, which has four boulder chokes (rock obstructed passages) in it, and Southern Stream Passage, a long, wet and tedious passage. There are also the Outer and the Inner Circles, which include Turkey Streamway; with some formations including gour pools. Each round trip takes upwards of six hours and some parts of the cave are prone to flooding. The sump at the 3rd Boulder Choke soon becomes water-filled, and in worse flood conditions it becomes impossible to negotiate the 2nd Boulder Choke and the narrow section of Turkey Streamway above Northwest Junction. Maytime and the Lower Main Stream become inaccessible under flood conditions. In general, Agen Allwedd contains few formations. Agen Allwedd is also important due to the numbers of bats that roost there. Bats are strictly protected from disturbance under the Wildlife & Countryside Act 1981, the Habitat Regulations 1994 and the EC Habitats Directive. It is a criminal offence to deliberately or recklessly disturb bats. Cavers should take care to avoid causing disturbance.

== Access ==
Originally, the cave was accessed through the Agen Allwedd entrance, but gated access is now available through the Ogof Gam entrance. This provides a bypass to an awkward rift section and that route is now blocked with a pillar. Keys are available to people with valid permits who must sign the book on entering the cave indicating the route to be taken. No carbide is to be used in the cave and additional permits are required for camping inside, blasting or research.

== See also ==
- Daren Cilau
- Craig a Ffynnon
