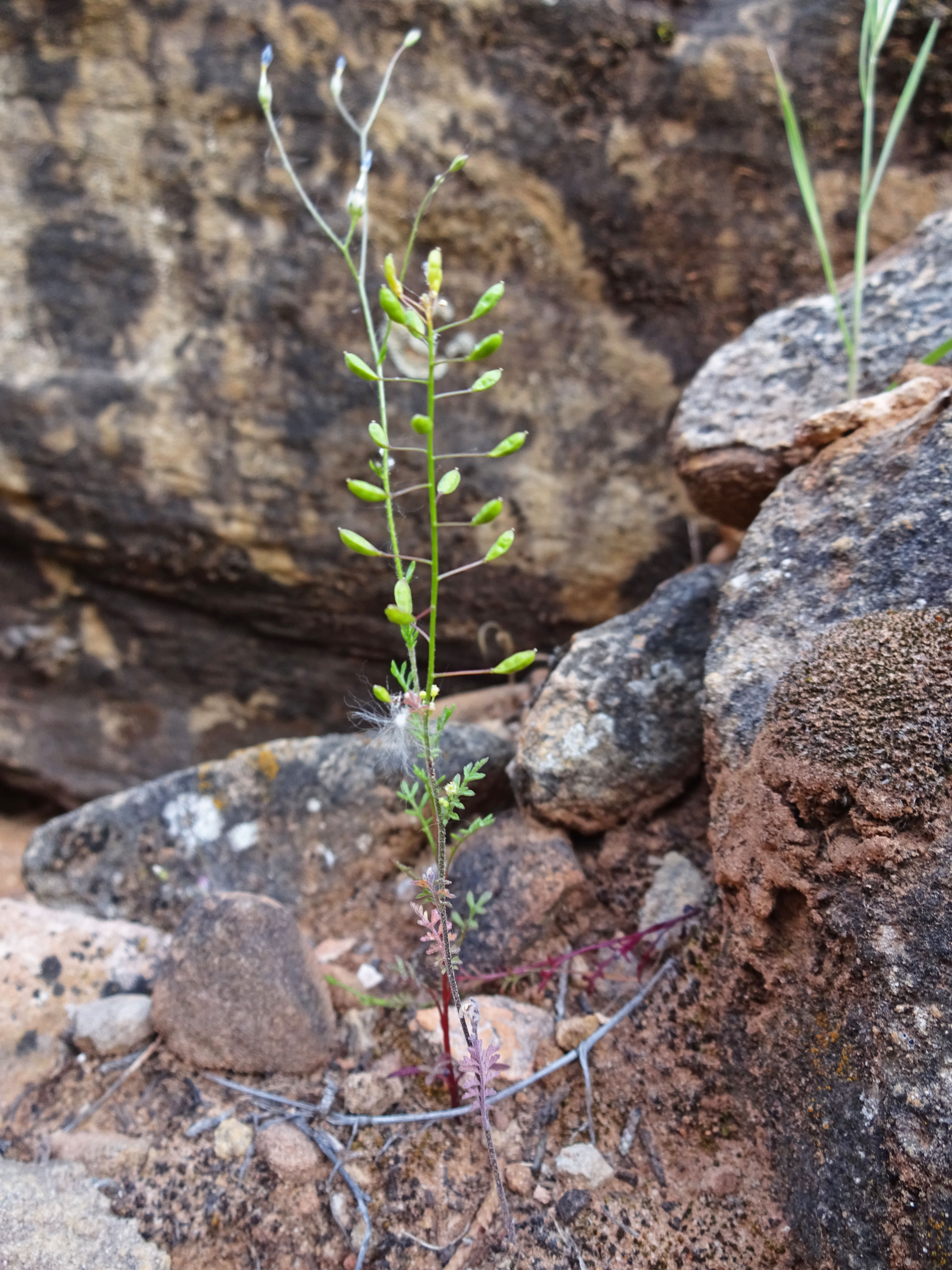

Conservation status
- Secure (NatureServe)

Scientific classification
- Kingdom: Plantae
- Clade: Tracheophytes
- Clade: Angiosperms
- Clade: Eudicots
- Clade: Rosids
- Order: Brassicales
- Family: Brassicaceae
- Genus: Hornungia
- Species: H. procumbens

Binomial name
- Hornungia procumbens (L.) Hayek

Subspecies
- Hornungia procumbens subsp. procumbens; Hornungia procumbens subsp. revelierei (Jord.) Giardina & Raimondo

Synonyms
- Capsella elliptica C.A.Mey.; Capsella procumbens (L.) Fr.; Hutchinsia procumbens (L.) Desv.; Hymenolobus procumbens (L.) Nutt.; Lepidium procumbens L.; Noccaea procumbens (L.) Rchb.; Thlaspi procumbens (L.) Lapeyr.

= Hornungia procumbens =

Species of flowering plant

Hornungia procumbens is a species of herb native to the temperate zone of the northern hemisphere. Common names include oval purse, slenderweed and prostrate hutchinsia.

== Description ==
It is an annual herb with white flowers. Growth habit ranged from procumbent (trailing along the ground) to upright; when upright it can reach up to 30 centimetres in height.

== Taxonomy ==
The generic placement of this species has long been in dispute. When first published by Carl Linnaeus in his 1753 Species plantarum, it was placed in Lepidium as Lepidium procumbens. In 1815, Nicaise Auguste Desvaux transferred it into Hutchinsia. In 1832 Elias Magnus Fries transferred it into Capsella. It was transferred into Hymenolobus by Hans Schinz and Albert Thellung in 1921, and four years later placed in Hornungia by August von Hayek. A number of the resulting names are still maintained. Most herbaria have adopted Hornungia procumbens, but many use Hymenolobus procumbens, and a few retain Hutchinsia procumbens.

== Distribution and habitat ==
It is native to the temperate zone of the northern hemisphere.
