= Ogof y Daren Cilau =

Cave in Llangattock, Powys, Wales

Coordinates: 51.83064°N 3.15479°W

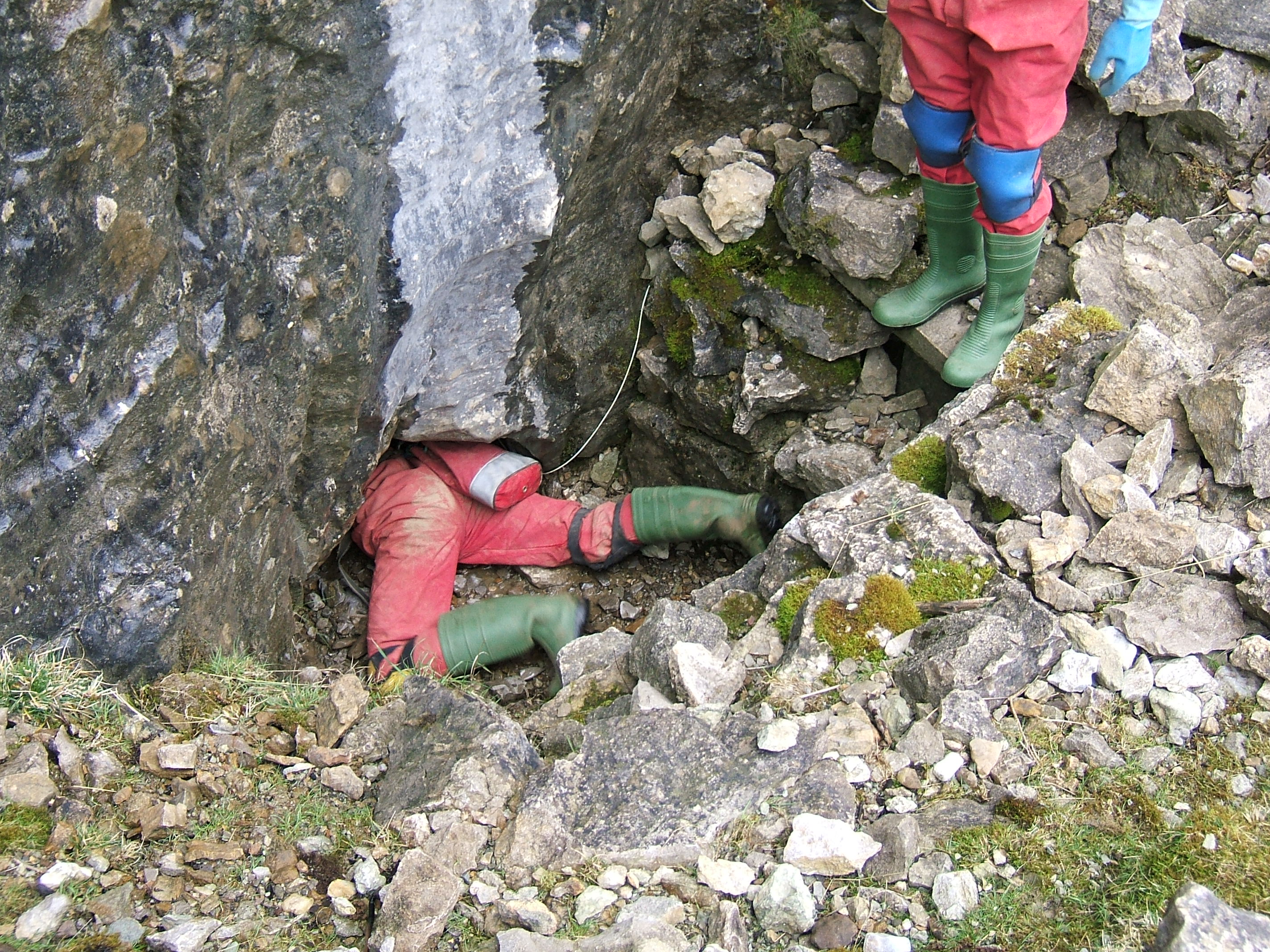
- Caver crawling into entrance
- Interactive map of Ogof y Daren Cilau
- Location: Llangattock escarpment
- OS grid: SO20521530
- Depth: 192 m (630 ft)
- Length: 27 km (16.8 mi)
- Entrances: 2
- Difficulty: tortuous entrance series
- Access: Public access via the Crawl. Via the Ogof Cnwc entrance, the Mynydd Llangatwg Cave Management Advisory Committee
- Translation: Cave of the outcrop with [many] nooks (Welsh)
- Cave survey: Chelsea Spelaeological Society
- Registry: Cambrian Cave Register

Ogof y Daren Cilau is a cave system in the limestone escarpment on Mynydd Llangatwg (Llangattock Mountain), which is south of Llangattock village and overlooks Crickhowell in south Powys, Mid Wales. The escarpment is the remnant of quarrying that had begun by the mid-18th century and initially provided limestone for building and agriculture as a fertiliser, and subsequently for the blast furnaces of the local ironworks as a flux. The cave system was discovered in 1957 and is one of the longest in the United Kingdom. The system is next to the Ogof Agen Allwedd system.

== The cave ==
Ogof y Daren Cilau is one of the longest cave systems in the United Kingdom (over 26 kilometres/16 miles in total) and the entrance section is long, tight and strenuous, making the trip into the further parts of the cave a serious undertaking. Its awkward 517-metre (1,696 ft) entrance crawl is a natural barrier to any casual visitor and precludes the need for a locked gate to protect it from vandals. Highlights of Daren Cilau include the "Time Machine", the largest cave passage in Britain; the "White Company", a set of pure white stalactites; and the "Bonsai Tree", a branching helictite.

Because of the extent of the passages several kilometres from the entrance which would require trips of up to 20 hours to explore, some permanent underground camps have been established, including the "Restaurant at the End of the Universe", which is some thirteen hours from the entrance.

== History ==
The article by Llangattock Local History Society (1961) is an extremely informative early source of information, see particularly the section entitled 'Llangattock Caves' on pages 126 to 129. The later contribution of a chapter by Smart and Gardener (1989) to the book Limestones and caves in Wales is also informative.

The entrance to the cave was discovered in 1957 by Vic Howells of the British Nylon Spinners Caving Club. Further investigation and the removal of debris showed an entrance in which a pool of water accumulated. In the ensuing period, the water was drained away and a 400-foot (120 m) passage was revealed ending in a boulder choke. The major breakthrough into the system beyond the entrance series occurred in 1984, before which the cave consisted of little more than the entrance series and several uninspiring passages. In 1986 Martyn Farr connected the Terminal Sump to Elm Hole in the next valley by cave diving.

After decades of work and numerous cave digging projects, a connection to the nearby cave Ogof Agen Allwedd has yet to be found, even though they are only 75 metres (246 ft) apart at their closest point.

== See also ==
- Craig a Ffynnon
- Agen Allwedd
