= The Darkness Beckons =

History of UK cave diving by Martyn Farr

The Darkness Beckons: The History and Development of Cave Diving
- Author: Martyn Farr
- Language: English
- Subject: Cave diving
- Publisher: Diadem Books
- Publication date: 1980
- ISBN: 0-939748-32-0
- OCLC: 23766199
- Dewey Decimal: 796.5/25 20
- LC Class: GV200.63 .F37 1991

The Darkness Beckons: The History and Development of Cave Diving is a non-fiction book about the history of UK cave diving by Martyn Farr. It is considered the definitive work on the subject. Farr was a major figure in UK diving at a time when many of the original participants were still alive and available for interview. The first edition of the book was published in 1980. A second edition was published in 1991, followed by a substantially rewritten third edition on 3 July 2017.

== Awards ==
The third edition of The Darkness Beckons was shortlisted for the 2018 British Sports Book Awards in the Illustrated Book of the Year category.

== See also ==
- Cave Diving Group
- Caving in the United Kingdom
