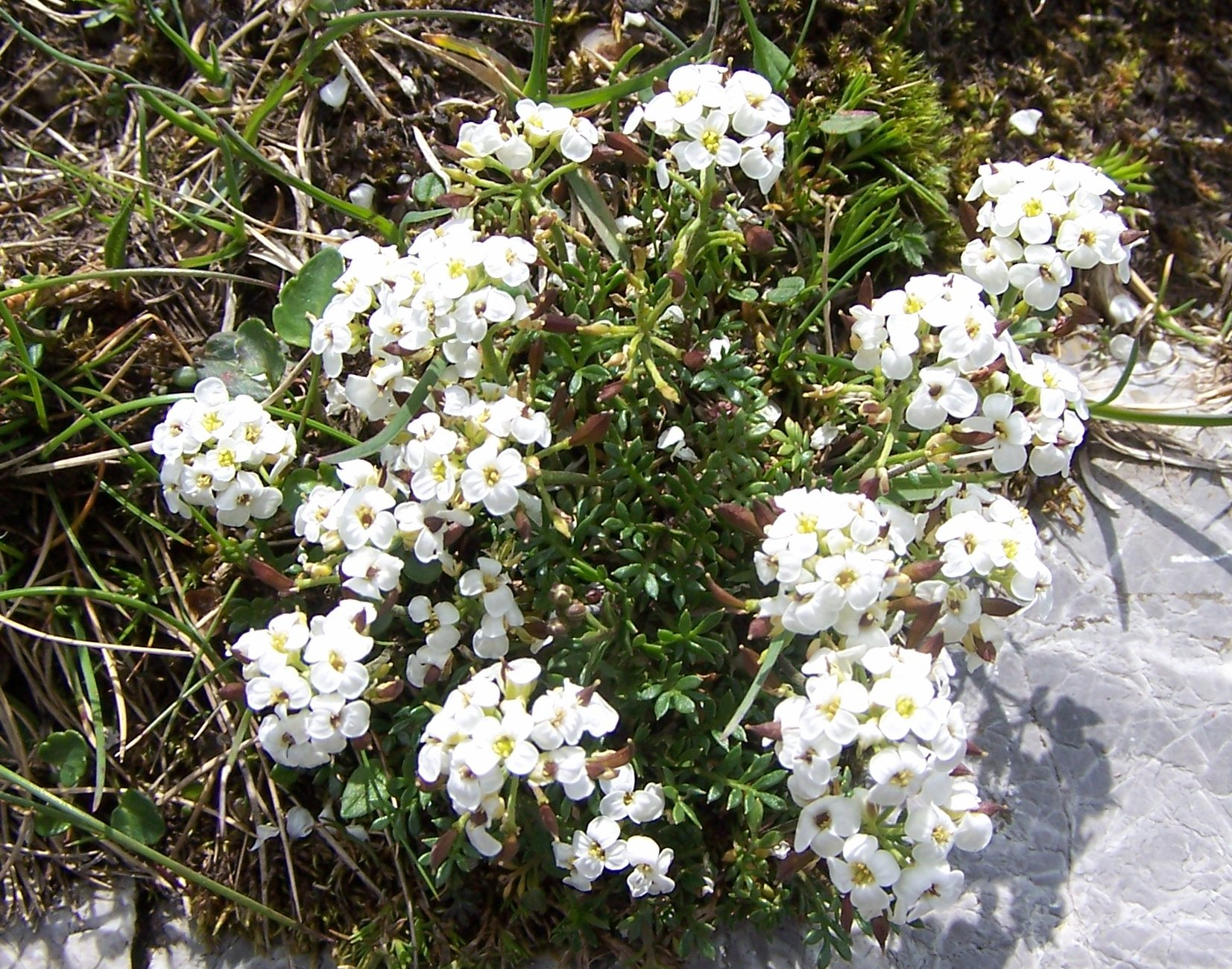

Scientific classification
- Kingdom: Plantae
- Clade: Tracheophytes
- Clade: Angiosperms
- Clade: Eudicots
- Clade: Rosids
- Order: Brassicales
- Family: Brassicaceae
- Genus: Hornungia
- Species: H. alpina

Binomial name
- Hornungia alpina (L.) R.Br.

= Hornungia alpina =

Species of flowering plant

Hornungia alpina (also Hutchinsia alpina or Pritzelago alpina) is a flowering plant in the family Brassicaceae. It is native to the mountains of Southern and Central Europe, as far south as northern Spain (Pyrenees and Cordillera Cantábrica), central Italy and North Macedonia , and is sometimes grown as an ornamental plant in gardens .
