= Llangattock, Powys =

Village and community in Powys, Wales

Llangattock
- Village and community
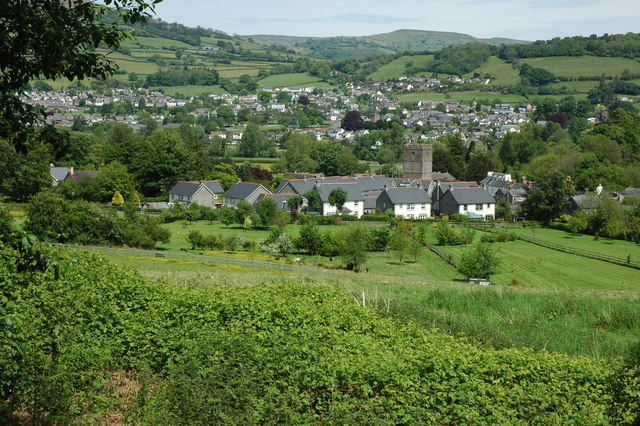
- The village and church from the canal, with Crickhowell beyond.

- Location within Powys
- Principal area: Powys
- Country: Wales
- Sovereign state: United Kingdom
- Police: Dyfed-Powys
- Fire: Mid and West Wales
- Ambulance: Welsh
- List of places UK Wales Powys 51.8509°N 3.1484°W Community map: Map of the community

Llangattock (Welsh: Llangatwg) is a village, community and electoral ward in the Brecon Beacons National Park in Powys, Wales. It lies in the Usk Valley just across the river from the town of Crickhowell. The Monmouthshire and Brecon Canal passes through the village en route between Brecon and Pontypool. It is in the historic county of Breconshire.

According to the 2011 UK census the population of the community was 999, with the village itself having a population of around 660.

Llangattock elects a community council of ten members who, amongst other things, are responsible for the running of Llangattock cemetery. Llangattock electoral ward also elects one county councillor to Powys County Council.

== Location ==
To the south of Llangattock village is the imposing Llangattock Escarpment whose great limestone cliffs were scarred by extensive quarrying in the nineteenth century. Above these is the great gritstone plateau of Mynydd Llangatwg or Llangattock Mountain. Some of Britain's longest cave systems lie concealed beneath this hill, including Ogof y Daren Cilau and Ogof Agen Allwedd together with the shorter though more accessible cave of Eglwys Faen (or 'stone church'). The natural amphitheatre formed by the cliffs of Craig y Cilau and the quarried Daren Cilau was designated a national nature reserve on account of a variety of rare plants, notably species of whitebeam endemic to the area. The hollow itself is thought to be a product of both glacial action and a massive rotational landslip during the ice ages. The village is near Crug Hywel which is clearly seen from most houses.

== The village ==
The village is close to Crickhowell. It has a church, St Catwg's, a pub (that does not open on Mondays and Tuesdays) and is a mostly residential area. It is home to a chapel, and is of archaeological interest due to the 4,000 year old burial ground in the park. It has a boathouse and old limekilns, “scars of its industrial past”. It also has a school with around 100 pupils.

=== The Dardy ===
There is a smaller village in Llangattock community further along the canal. It houses Llangattock's old workhouse, residents and chicken coops.

=== The church ===
Llangattock church is dedicated to St Catwg (or Cattwg). The tower was built in the 12th century, and it has six bells. It also houses antique whipping posts and stocks.

=== Llangattock Park House ===
To the north of the village stands Llangattock Park House, a shooting lodge built by Thomas Henry Wyatt for Henry Somerset, 7th Duke of Beaufort. It is a Grade II listed building and its gardens and park are listed at Grade II on the Cadw/ICOMOS Register of Parks and Gardens of Special Historic Interest in Wales.

=== Plâs Llangattock (Llangattwg) ===
Also to the north of the village stands Plâs Llangattock, an 18th-century gentry house. It is a Grade II* listed building and its gardens are listed, also at Grade II* on the Cadw/ICOMOS Register of Parks and Gardens of Special Historic Interest in Wales.

== Historical importance ==
The parish of Llangattock was one of the first and largest in Wales, though it has since shrunk. The Marconi family worked on some of the earliest telegraph experiments there. Llangattock had a large lime quarry.

== Famous/notable Residents ==
- Admiral John Gell retired at Llanwysg House
- 17th-century metaphysical poet Henry Vaughan and his brother Thomas Vaughan were schooled as boys by the local rector.
- Anne Eleanor Colclough, wife of late English rugby player Maurice Colclough.
