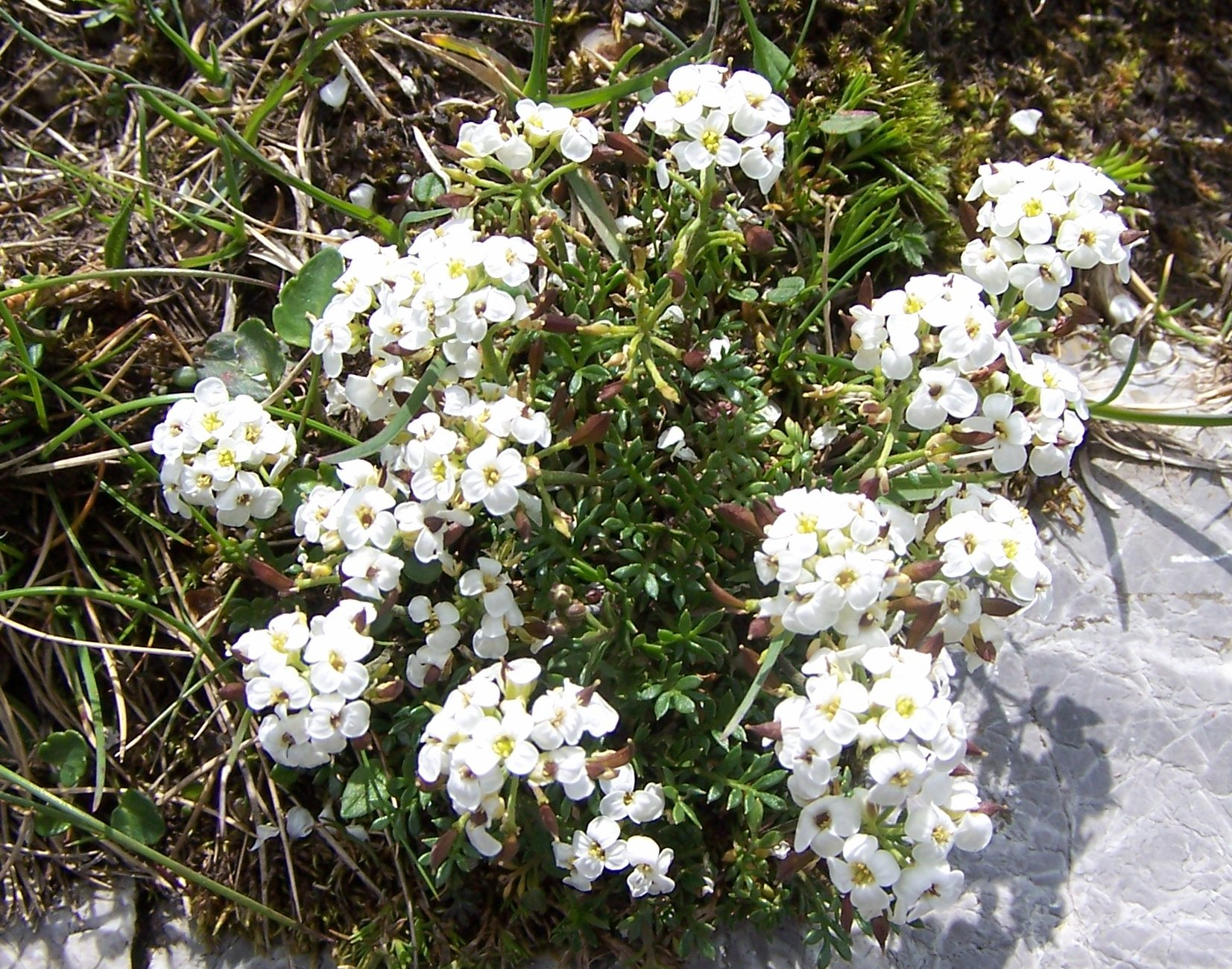
- Hornungia alpina

Scientific classification
- Kingdom: Plantae
- Clade: Tracheophytes
- Clade: Angiosperms
- Clade: Eudicots
- Clade: Rosids
- Order: Brassicales
- Family: Brassicaceae
- Genus: Hornungia; Rchb. 1837 not Bernh. 1840 (syn of Gagea in Liliaceae)

Synonyms
- Astylus Dulac; Hinterhubera Rchb. ex Nyman; Hutchinsiella O.E.Schulz; Hymenolobus Nutt.; Microcardamum O.E.Schulz; Nasturtiolum Gray; Pritzelago Kuntze

= Hornungia =

Genus of flowering plants

Hornungia is a small genus of plants in the family Brassicaceae. It currently contains three species that have previously been classified as members of other genera, including Hutchinsia and Pritzelago. The genera, and sometimes several others, are usually treated as synonyms.

== Species ==
Seven species are accepted.

- Hornungia alpina (L.) O.Appel (syn. Hutchinsia alpina)
- Hornungia angustilimbata V.I.Dorof.
- Hornungia aragonensis (Loscos & J.Pardo) Heywood
- Hornungia pauciflora (W.D.J.Koch) Soldano, F.Conti, Banfi & Galasso
- Hornungia petraea (L.) Rchb. (syn. Hutchinsia petraea)
- Hornungia procumbens (L.) Hayek (syn. Hutchinsia procumbens)
- Hornungia puberula (Rupr.) D.A.German

These are fleshy annuals with white flowers native to Eurasia. One species, H. procumbens, is also widespread in North America.
