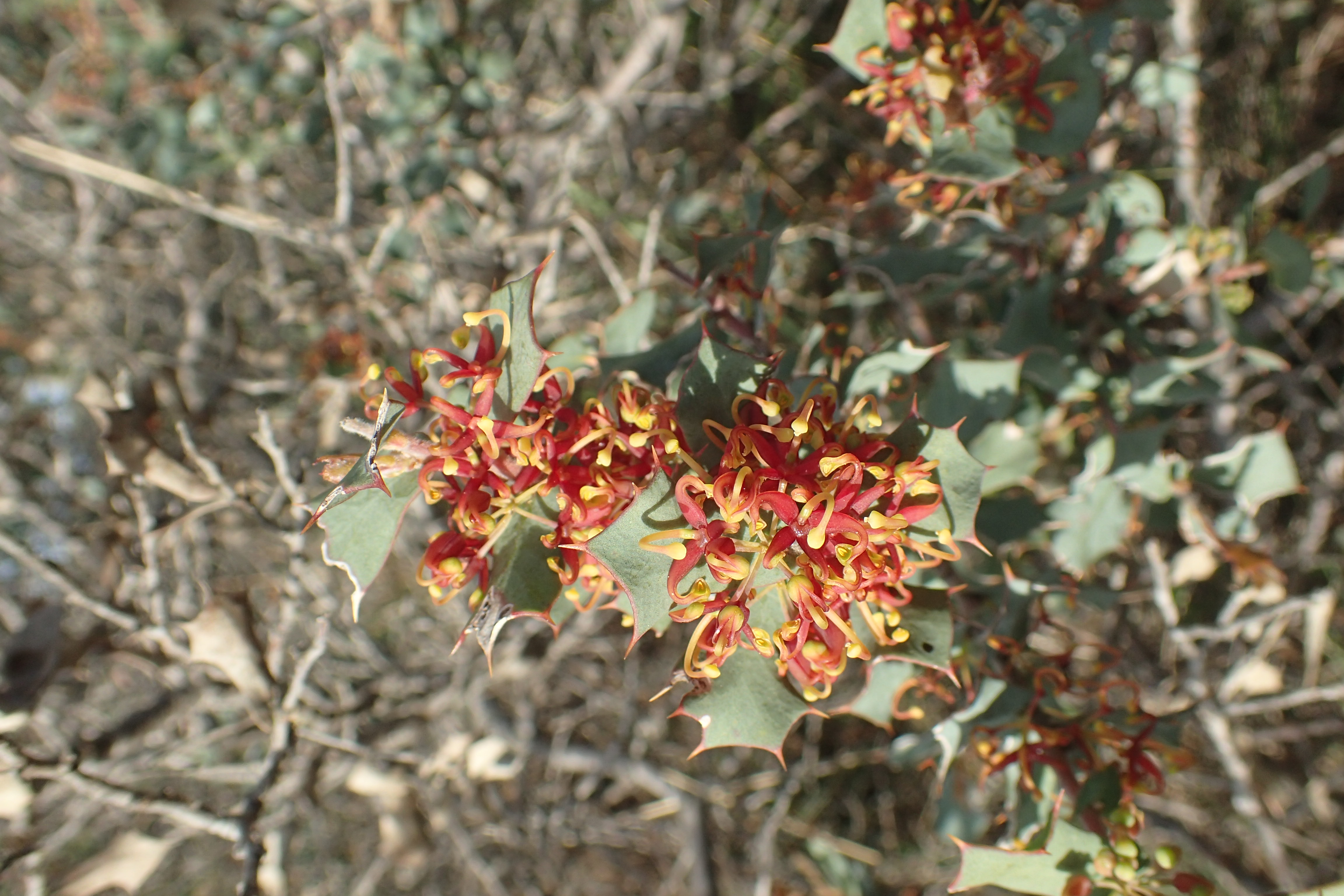

Scientific classification
- Kingdom: Plantae
- Clade: Tracheophytes
- Clade: Angiosperms
- Clade: Eudicots
- Order: Proteales
- Family: Proteaceae
- Genus: Hakea
- Species: H. pritzelii

Binomial name
- Hakea pritzelii Diels

= Hakea pritzelii =

Species of shrub endemic to Western Australia

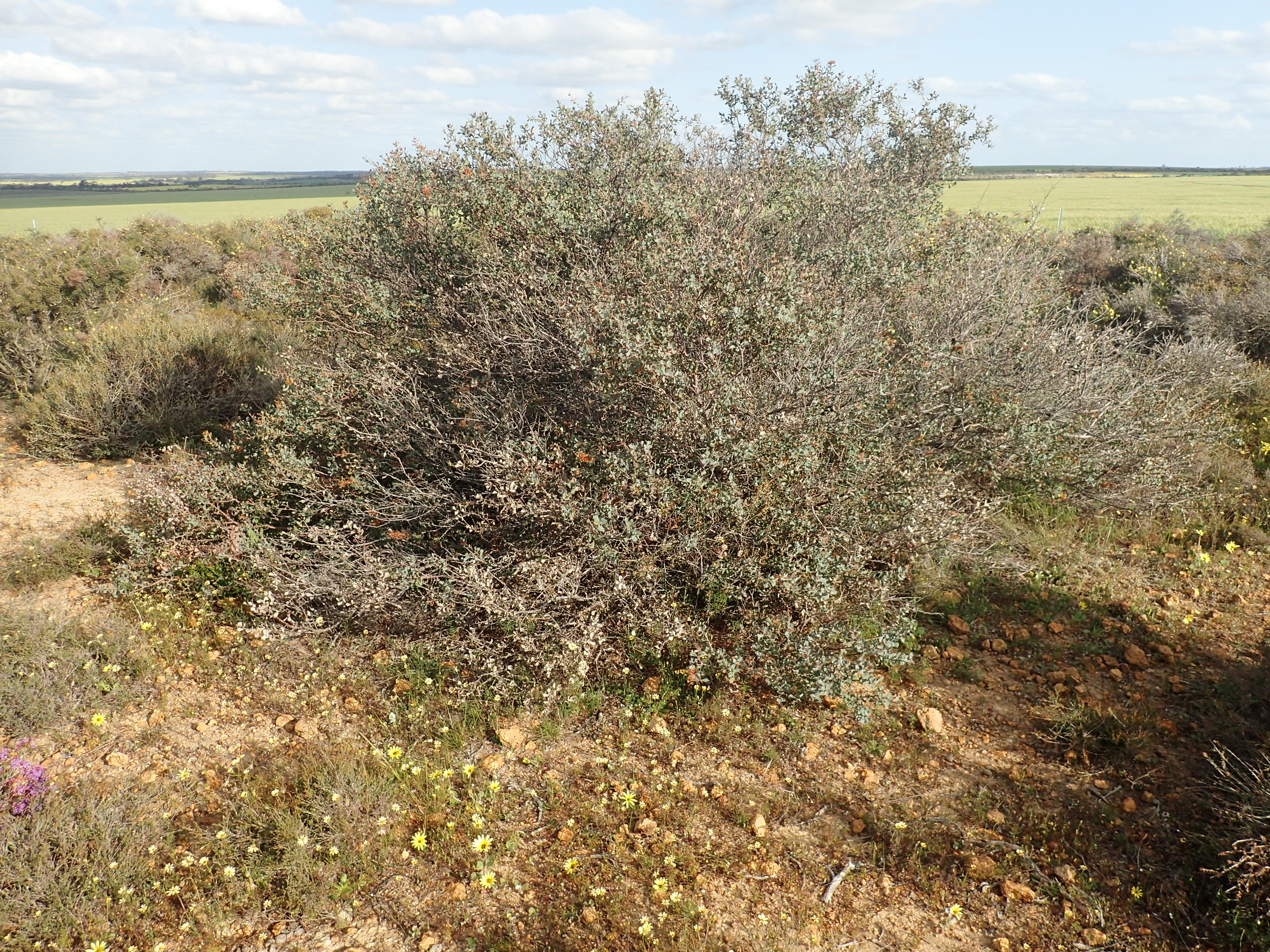
Habit in a nature reserve south of Tarin Rock

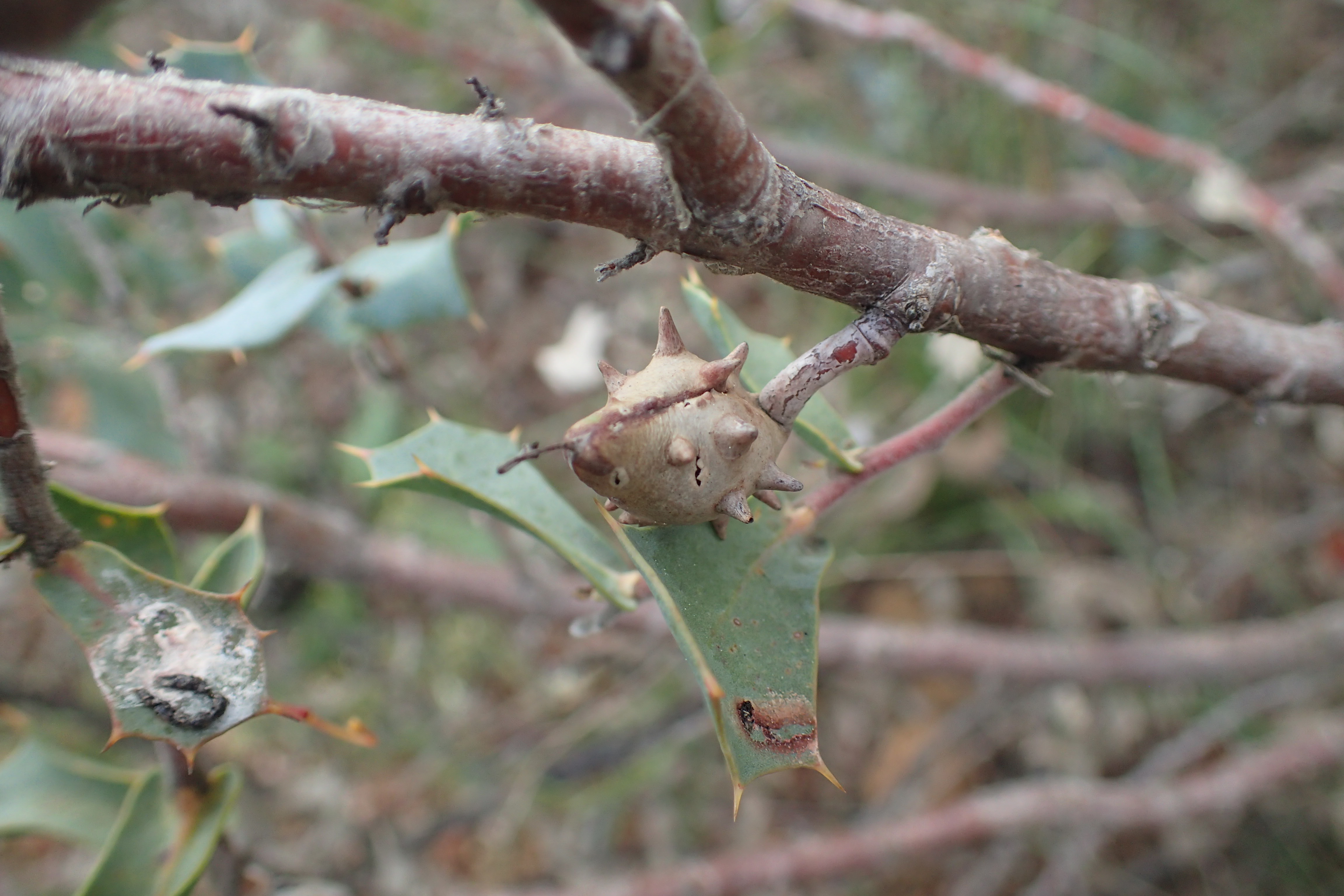
Fruit

Hakea pritzelii is a flowering shrub in the family Proteaceae and is endemic to a few small areas in the Great Southern region of Western Australia. It has rigid, pale green leaves and scented red-purple flowers.

== Description ==
Hakea pritzelli is an erect, dense, spreading shrub typically growing to a height of 1 to 2.5 metres (3.3 to 8.2 ft). It blooms from July to August and produces sweetly scented red-purple flowers with a light green style in clusters in leaf axils or along stems on old wood. The leaves are obovate, thick, rigid and stem clasping with a prominent sharp point. The pale green leaves vary from being entire to shallowly divided having 3, 5 or 9 small very sharp, prickly teeth. The fruit are 20 mm (0.8 in) long and 9–10 mm (0.4–0.4 in) wide with corky spines on the external surface.

== Taxonomy and naming ==
Hakea pritzelii was first formally described in 1904 by Ludwig Diels and the description was published in Botanische Jahrbücher für Systematik, Pflanzengeschichte und Pflanzengeographie. The species was named after the German botanist Ernst Georg Pritzel who travelled with Ludwig Diels collecting specimens of Western Australia flora.

== Distribution and habitat ==
Hakea pritzelii grows from Cranbrook and the Stirling Range National Park to Gnowangerup in heath and scrubland in white sand. Often found in low lying seasonally wet areas. It is a good habitat plant due to its dense prickly habit.

== Conservation status ==
Although Hakea pritzelii has a restricted range, it is considered "not threatened" by the Western Australian Government Department of Parks and Wildlife.
