= Powys =

County and preserved county in Wales

- County and preserved county
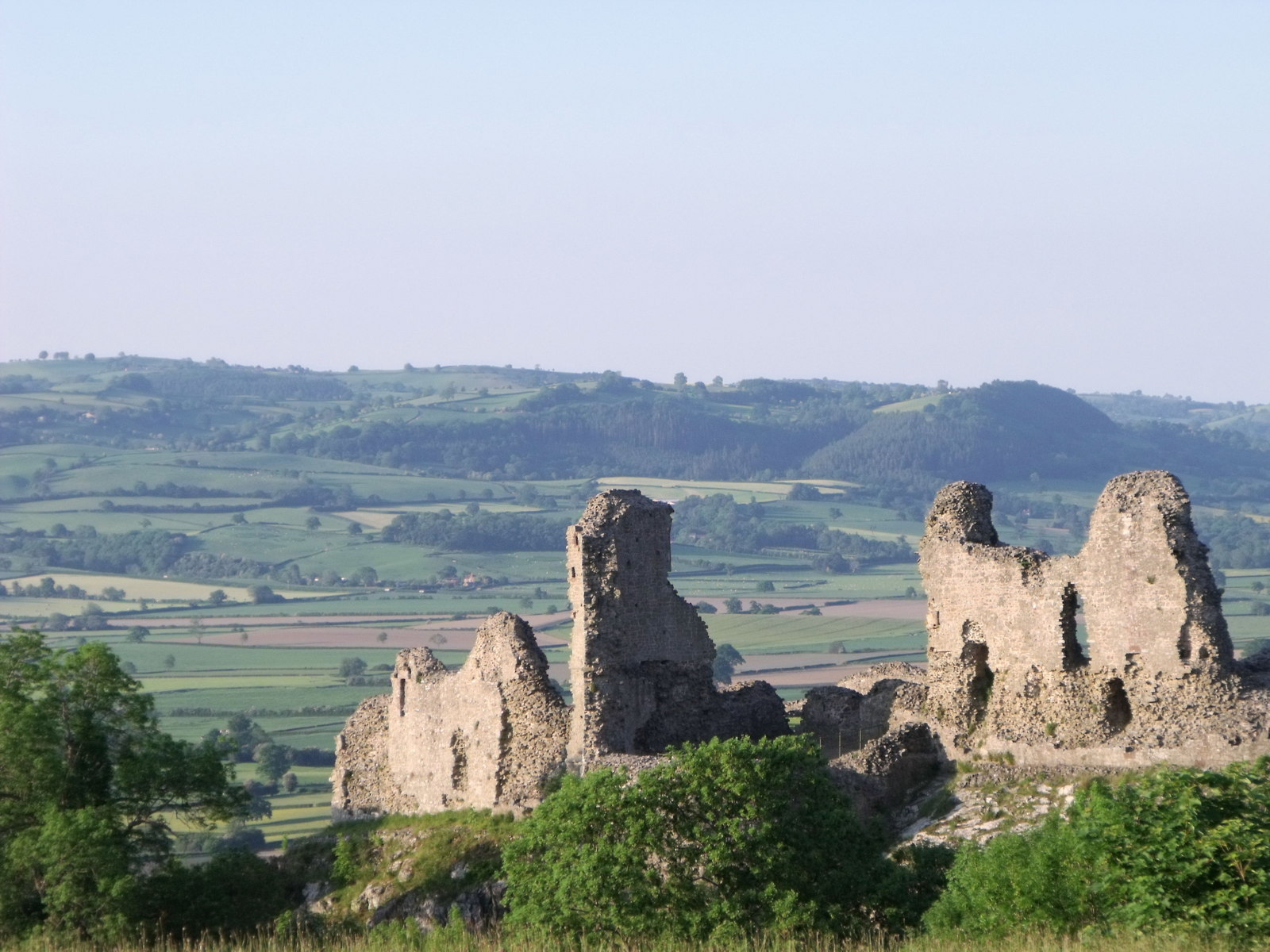
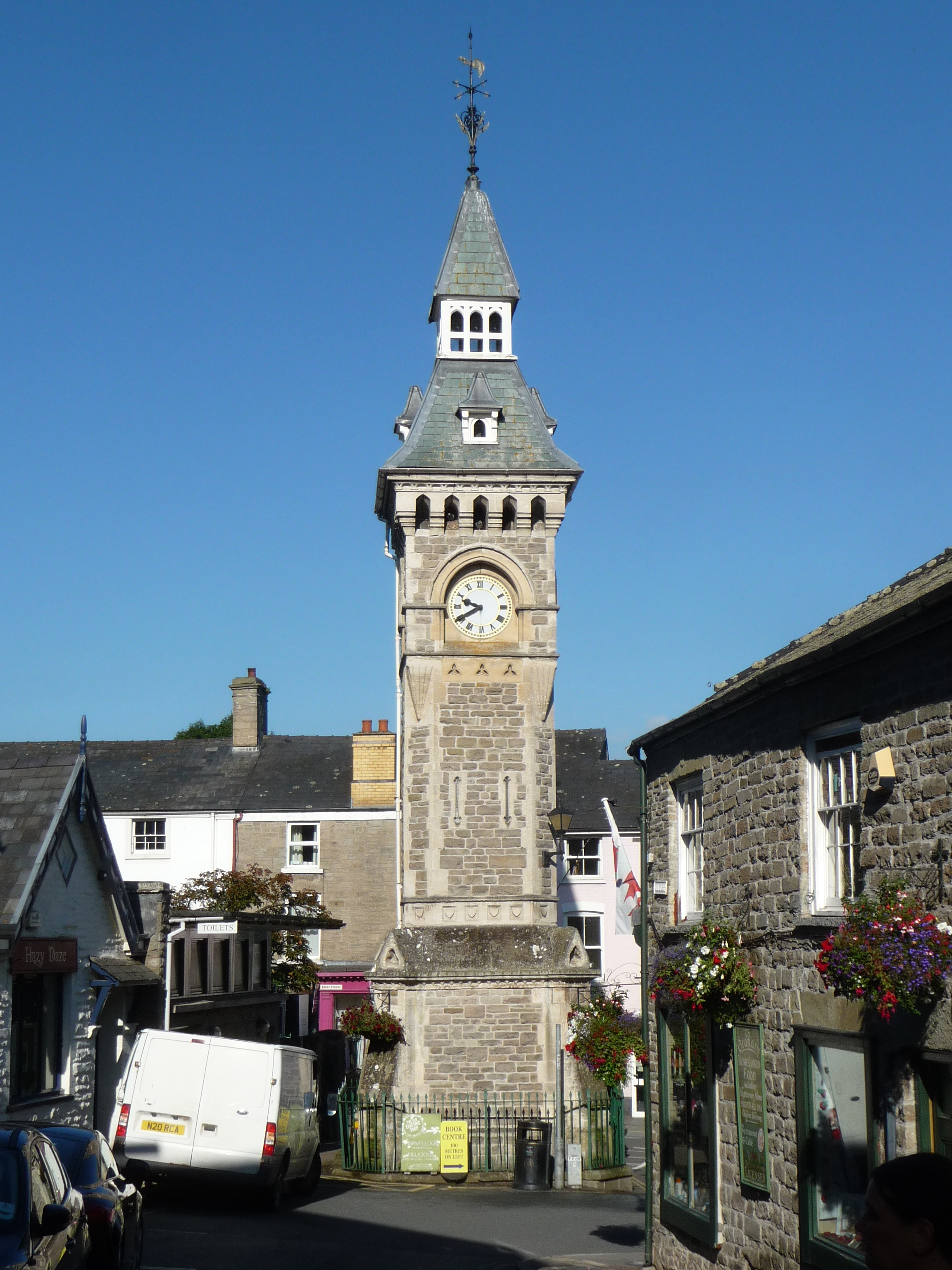
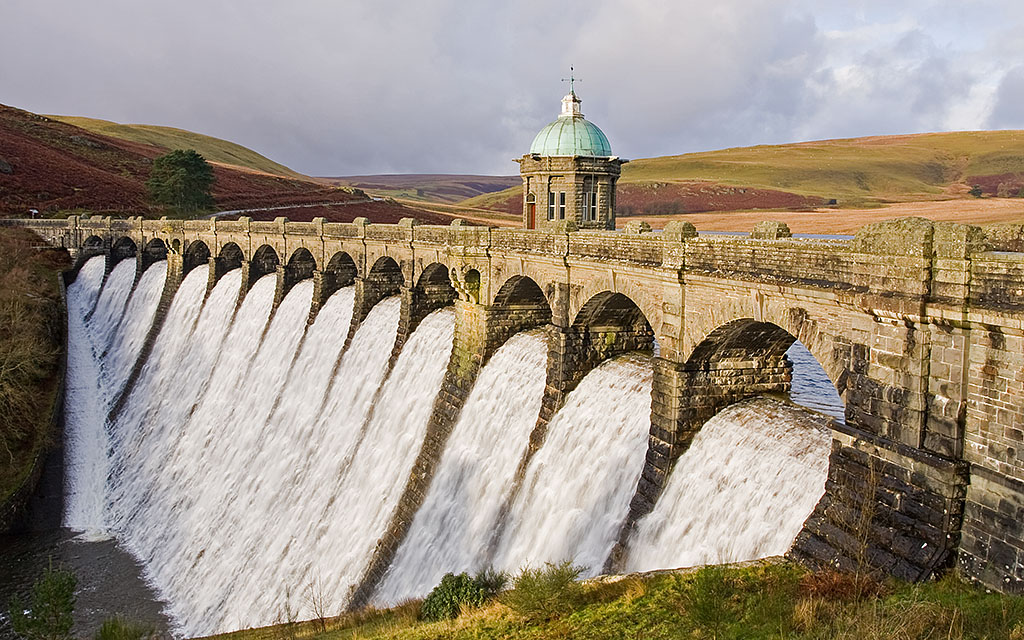
- Left to right: View from Montgomery Castle; Hay-on-Wye Clock Tower; Craig Goch Dam in the Elan Valley

- Coat of arms
- Motto: Welsh: Powys Paradwys Cymru, lit. 'Powys, paradise of Wales'
- Powys shown within Wales
- Coordinates: 52°18′N 3°25′W
- Sovereign state: United Kingdom
- Country: Wales
- Incorporated: 1 April 1974
- Unitary authority: 1 April 1996
- Administrative HQ: County Hall, Llandrindod Wells

Government
  - Type: Principal council
  - Body: Powys County Council
  - Control: No overall control
  - MPs: 2 MPs: David Chadwick (LD); Steve Witherden (L)
  - MSs: 12 MSs: 6 in Brycheiniog Tawe Nedd; 6 in Gwynedd Maldwyn

Area
  - Total: 2,000 sq mi (5,181 km^{2})
  - Rank: 1st

Population (2024)
  - Total: 135,059
  - Rank: 12th
  - Density: 67/sq mi (26/km^{2})

Welsh language (2021)
  - Speakers: 16.4%
  - Rank: 7th
- Time zone: UTC+0 (GMT)
  - Summer (DST): UTC+1 (BST)
- ISO 3166 code: GB-POW
- GSS code: W06000023
- Website: www.powys.gov.uk

Powys (/ˈpoʊɪs, ˈpaʊɪs/ POH-iss, POW-iss, Welsh: [ˈpou̯ɪs]) is a county and preserved county in Wales. (Note: Located in the east-central parts of Wales, either in the Mid Wales and East Wales regions or in both North and South Wales under historical definitions.) It borders Gwynedd, Denbighshire and Wrexham to the north; the English ceremonial counties of Shropshire and Herefordshire to the east; Monmouthshire, Blaenau Gwent, Merthyr Tydfil, Caerphilly, Rhondda Cynon Taf and Neath Port Talbot to the south; and Carmarthenshire and Ceredigion to the west. The largest settlement is Newtown, and the administrative centre is Llandrindod Wells.

Powys is the largest and most sparsely populated county in Wales, having an area of 5,181 km^{2} (2,000 sq mi) and a population of 135,059 in 2024. While largely rural, its towns include Welshpool in the north-east, Newtown in the north-centre, Llandrindod Wells in the south-centre, Brecon in the south, Ystradgynlais in the far south-west, and Machynlleth in the far west. The Welsh language can be spoken by 16.4% of the population. The boundaries of Powys largely follow those of the historic counties of Montgomeryshire, Radnorshire, and Brecknockshire.

The county is predominantly hilly and mountainous. To the west lie the Cambrian Mountains, where the River Severn and River Wye both have their source on the Powys side of the Plynlimon massif; together with their tributaries they drain most of the county. The southern quarter of Powys contains, from east to west, part of the Black Mountains, the Brecon Beacons, Fforest Fawr, and part of the Black Mountains, all of which are part of Brecon Beacons National Park. Further north are two more upland areas, Mynydd Epynt and Radnor Forest. The only extensive area of flat land in Powys is the region northeast of Welshpool.

The county is named after the Kingdom of Powys, which was a Welsh successor state, petty kingdom and principality that emerged during the Middle Ages following the end of Roman rule in Britain.

== Geography ==
Powys covers the historic counties of Montgomeryshire and Radnorshire, most of Brecknockshire, and part of historic Denbighshire. With an area of about 2,000 square miles (5,200 km^{2}), it is now the largest administrative area in Wales by land and area (Dyfed was until 1996 before several former counties created by the Local Government Act 1972 were abolished). It is bounded to the north by Gwynedd, Denbighshire and Wrexham County Borough; to the west by Ceredigion and Carmarthenshire; to the east by Shropshire and Herefordshire; and to the south by Rhondda Cynon Taf, Merthyr Tydfil County Borough, Caerphilly County Borough, Blaenau Gwent, Monmouthshire and Neath Port Talbot.

The largest towns are Newtown, Ystradgynlais, Brecon, Welshpool, Llandrindod Wells and Knighton. Powys has the lowest population density of all the principal areas of Wales. Most of Powys is mountainous, and most roads and railways are relatively slow.

Just under a third of the residents have Welsh linguistic skills: Welsh speakers are concentrated mainly in the rural areas both in and around Machynlleth, Llanfyllin and Llanrhaeadr-ym-Mochnant (where William Morgan first translated the whole Bible into Welsh in 1588) in Montgomeryshire, and the industrial area of Ystradgynlais in the southwest of Brecknockshire. In Radnorshire, the language survived into the 20th century west of Rhayader with a few native speakers from Nantmel parish surviving into the 20th century too. The 2021 census recorded that 16.4% of the population were able to speak the Welsh language, a decline from 18.6% in 2011 and 21% in 2001.

== History ==
The county is named after the ancient Welsh Kingdom of Powys, which in the sixth century AD included the northern two-thirds of the area as well as most of Shropshire, Herefordshire and adjacent areas now in England, and came to an end when it was occupied by Llywelyn ap Gruffudd of Gwynedd during the 1260s.

The uplands retain evidence of occupation from long before the Kingdom of Powys, and before the Romans, who built roads and forts across the area. There are 1130 identified burial mounds within the county, of varying styles and ages, dating from 4000 BC to 1000 BC, most of them belonging to the Bronze Age. Of these, 339 are scheduled monuments. Standing stones, most again dating to the Bronze Age, also occur in large numbers, 276 being found across the county, of which 92 are scheduled. From the Iron Age, the county has 90 scheduled hillforts and a further 54 enclosures and settlement sites.

Powys is served by the Cambrian Line and Heart of Wales line which offer connections to major towns and cities such as Swansea, Wrexham, Shrewsbury, Birmingham, Wolverhampton, Manchester, Cardiff, Aberystwyth, London and Telford. The county used to be served by key railways such as the Mid-Wales Railway, Oswestry and Newtown Railway, Tanat Valley Light Railway, Llanfyllin Branch, Leominster and Kington Railway, Swansea Vale Railway and the Hereford, Hay and Brecon Railway, all of which offered connections to South Wales, Hereford, Oswestry, North Wales and West Wales but have all since closed.

== Heraldry ==
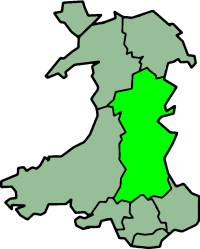
Powys from 1974 to 1996

The gold in the county council's coat of arms symbolises the wealth of the area. Black is for both mining and the Black Mountains. The fountain is a medieval heraldic charge displayed as a roundel barry wavy argent and azure. It represents water and refers to both the water catchment area and the rivers and lakes. Thus, the arms contain references to the hills and mountains, rivers and lakes, water supply and industry. The crest continues the colouring of the arms. A tower has been used in preference to a mural crown, which alludes to the county's military history and remains. From the tower rises a red kite, a bird almost extinct elsewhere in Britain but thriving in Powys. The bird is a "semé of black lozenges" for the former coal mining industry, while the golden fleece it carries is a reference to the importance of sheep rearing in the county.

The county motto is: Powys – the paradise of Wales (Welsh: Powys Paradwys Cymru).

== Government ==
On 1 April 1974, Powys was created under the Local Government Act 1972. At first, the former administrative counties of Montgomery, Radnor, and Brecknock were districts within it. On 1 April 1996, the districts were abolished, and Powys was reconstituted as a unitary authority. There was a minor border adjustment in the northeast—specifically, the addition of the communities of Llansilin and Llangedwyn from Glyndŵr district in Clwyd—and with moving the border, so that rather than half of Llanrhaeadr-ym-Mochnant, all is included.

The first Lord Lieutenant of Powys was previously the Lord Lieutenant of Montgomeryshire. The Lord Lieutenant of Brecknockshire and Lord Lieutenant of Radnorshire were appointed as lieutenants. The present lord lieutenant is Shân Legge-Bourke of Crickhowell.

The two UK parliament constituencies covering Powys (in pink) from 2024. 1 = Montgomeryshire and Glyndŵr, 2 = Brecon, Radnor and Cwm Tawe

From 2024, Powys would be in the UK parliament constituencies of Brecon, Radnor and Cwm Tawe and Montgomeryshire and Glyndŵr, both of which extend out of the county. From 2026, it would be part of the two Senedd constituencies of Brycheiniog Tawe Nedd and Gwynedd Maldwyn.

== Attractions ==
- Black Mountains
- Brecon Beacons – a mountain range
- Radnor Forest
- Y Gaer – a Roman fort
- Battle of Bryn Glas

=== Castles ===
- Dolforwyn Castle
- Montgomery Castle
- Powis Castle
- Tretower Castle
- Aberedw Castle
- Castell Du
- Bronllys Castle
- Cefnllys Castle

=== Lakes, reservoirs and waterfalls ===
- Elan Valley Reservoirs
- Lake Vyrnwy
- Llangorse Lake
- Clywedog Reservoir
- Pistyll y Llyn – one of the highest waterfalls in Wales
- Pistyll Rhaeadr
- Water-breaks-its-neck – waterfall in Radnor Forest
- Waterfall Country – waterfalls on the upper tributaries of the River Neath

=== Cathedral ===
- Brecon Cathedral

=== Cave systems ===
- Ogof Agen Allwedd
- Ogof Craig a Ffynnon
- Ogof Ffynnon Ddu
- Ogof y Daren Cilau

=== Museums and exhibitions ===
- Centre for Alternative Technology, Machynlleth
- Llandrindod Wells Museum
- National Cycle Museum, Llandrindod Wells
- Llanidloes Museum
- Knighton Museum, Knighton
- Museum of Welsh Textiles, Whitton, Powys
- Newtown Textile Museum
- Powysland Museum, Welshpool
- Judge's Lodging, Presteigne
- The Old Bell Museum, Montgomery
- Robert Owen Museum, Newtown
- WHSmith Museum, Newtown
- Rhayader Museum & Gallery, Rhayader
- Wyeside Arts Centre, Builth Wells
- Y Gaer, Brecon
- Llanwrtyd Wells Heritage and Arts Centre, Llanwrtyd Wells

=== Walks ===
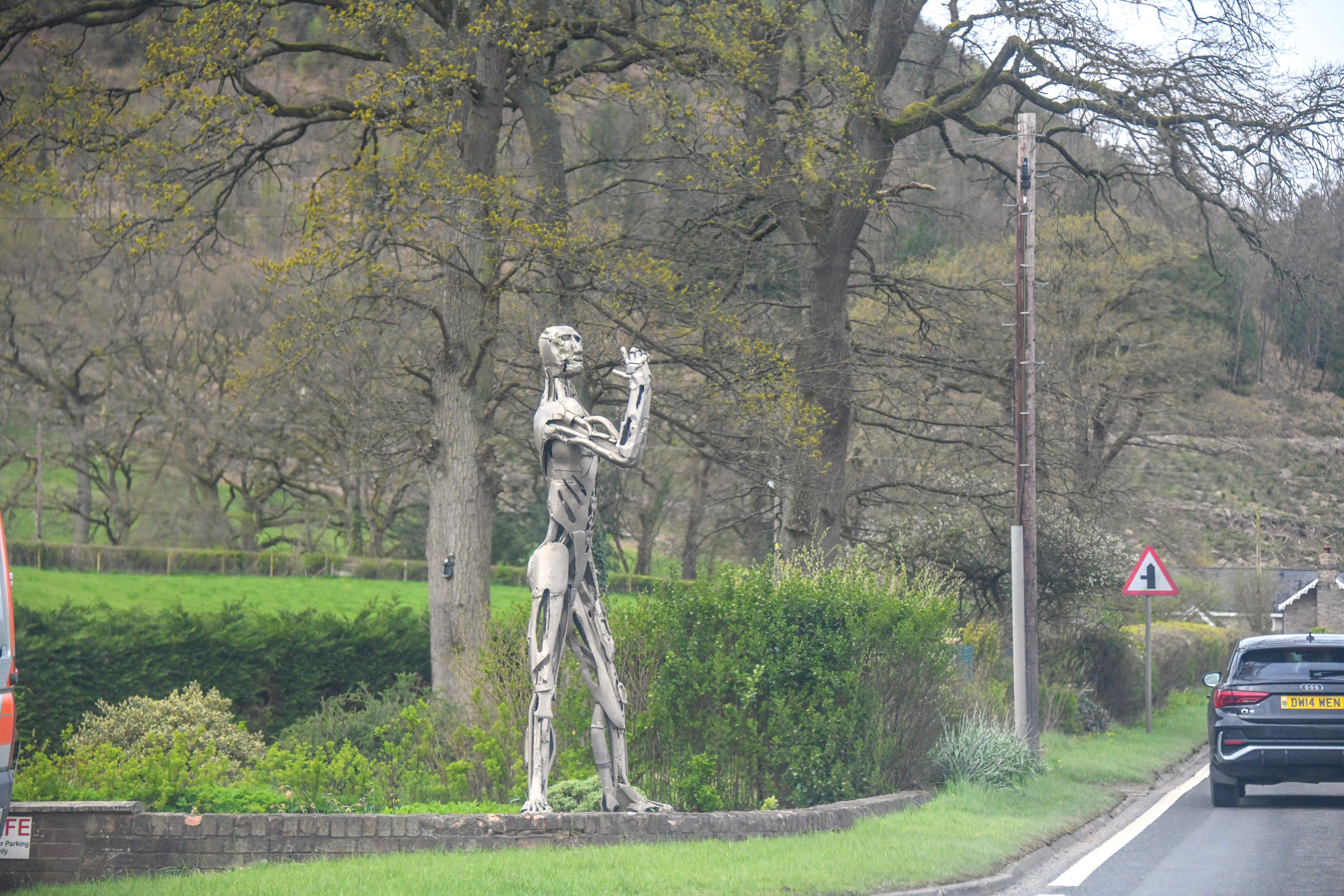
Llanidloes Without, Sculpture by Lewis Clarke

- Glyndŵr's Way – a 135-mile (217 km) extended loop through Powys between Knighton and Welshpool
- Sarn Sabrina Walk – a 25-mile (40 km) circular walking route from Llanidloes to the source of the River Severn
- Severn Way – described by the Long Distance Walkers Association as a 224-mile (360 km) waymarked long-distance trail
- Taff Trail – walking and cycle path that runs for 55 miles (89 km) between Cardiff Bay and Brecon
- Offa's Dyke Path – a long-distance footpath about 177-mile (285 km)
- Wye Valley Walk – a 136 miles (219 km) long-distance footpath from Chepstow to Rhayader

=== Railways ===
- Brecon Mountain Railway (heritage line)
- Cambrian Line (main line)
- Heart of Wales line (main line)
- Welshpool & Llanfair Light Railway (heritage line)

== Fairtrade ==
In December 2007, Powys was awarded Fair Trade County status by The Fairtrade Foundation.

== See also ==
- List of Lord Lieutenants of Powys
- List of High Sheriffs of Powys
- List of schools in Powys
- List of churches in Powys
