= Mynydd Llangatwg =

Hill (528.9m) in Powys, Wales

Coordinates: 51.8236°N 3.1667°W

Mynydd Llangatwg or Llangattock Mountain is a hill in the Brecon Beacons National Park mostly in the county of Powys, south Wales but also extending into both Monmouthshire and Blaenau Gwent. It is named from the village of Llangatwg (or 'Llangattock') which sits in the valley of the River Usk to the north of it. It is essentially an undulating plateau rising in the west to a height of 530 metres (1,740 ft) at grid reference SO171157 and in the east to a height of 529 metres (1,736 ft) at Hen Dy-aderyn / Twr Pen-cyrn. This latter spot is marked by a trig point. The shallow pool of Pwll Gwy-rhoc sits in a broad depression towards the northern edge of the plateau whilst a smaller pool frequently occupies a large shakehole a few hundred metres to its west. The hill forms an impressive northern scarp overlooking the Usk valley and commonly referred to as the Llangattock Escarpment. Its southern margins are more subdued. Its eastern end is defined by the drops into the Clydach Gorge. Beyond the B4560 to the west the hill merges with Mynydd Llangynidr which has a similar character.

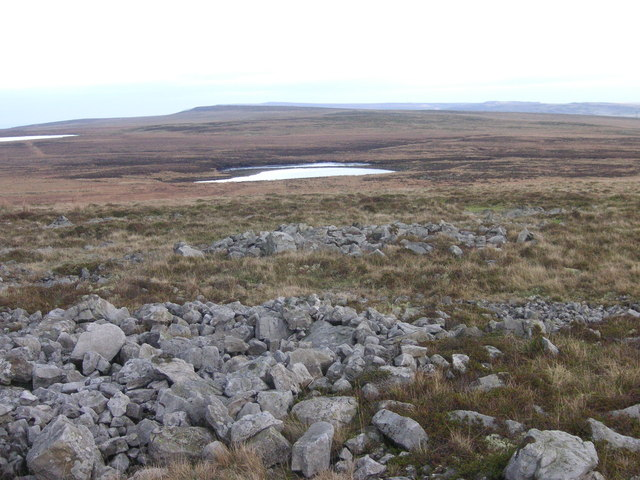
Looking south east across Mynydd Llangatwg from Ty Aderyn with periglacial boulder stream in foreground. (November 2005)

Particular features of note include 'The Lonely Shepherd', an isolated limestone pinnacle which stands at the eastern tip of the plateau, left there by quarryworkers who removed great quantities of the surrounding rock. A number of cairns are scattered across the hill, notably the sizeable pair which decorate the summit of Twr Pen-cyrn and which are thought to be of Neolithic age. Some freshwater ponds litter the mountain, including Pwll Gwy-rhoc the "witches' pool". A more recent addition to the landscape was Cairn-Mound Reservoir which once impounded the headwaters of Nant yr Hafod on the southern slopes. Welsh Water abandoned this some years ago and its bed has revegetated, though the embankment remains. A couple of gas pipelines have been laid across the mountain and their courses can be traced variously by fences, vegetation changes and marker poles.

== Geology ==
Mynydd Llangatwg is formed from a layer cake of Palaeozoic Era sandstones and limestones which dip gently southwards into the South Wales Coalfield basin. Imposing cliffs of Carboniferous Limestone occur along the northern escarpment and this rock underlies the entire hill and hosts the extensive cave systems which lie beneath it, notably those of Ogof y Daren Cilau and Ogof Agen Allwedd. These two systems are amongst the longest in Britain. The plateau is formed from coarse sandstones ('gritstones') also dating from the Carboniferous Period and which have foundered in many places as the underlying limestone has dissolved over millennia. The sandstone forming low secondary scarps above the main northern and eastern escarpments is the frequently conglomeratic Twrch Sandstone often still referred to by its earlier name, the Basal Grit. In contrast, the more poorly exposed sandstone forming the high ground of the centre of the hill is the lowermost Westphalian age Farewell Rock which marks the base of the South Wales Coal Measures. Sections of the hill have a pock-marked appearance due to the dozens of shakeholes in its surface arising from the presence of the limestone beneath the sandstone cover, an example of interstratal karst.

== Quarries and tramways ==
The greater part of the length of the northern escarpment is scarred by limestone quarries which operated for much of the nineteenth century. The rock was removed by means of a series of tramroads or tramways which linked north via steep inclines to a wharf on the Monmouthshire and Brecon Canal at Llangattock and south to Brynmawr and the ironworks at Nant-y-glo by two tramroads which contoured the eastern end of the hill. The upper tramway which dates from the start of the nineteenth century, runs south from Pant y Gilwern and Daren Disgwylfa and then west around the head of Cwm Clydach. It is now a grassy footpath providing easy walking through otherwise rough terrain. The lower tramway was constructed in 1828-30 and has since been converted to a public road. Both tramroads had several branches to serve individual quarries along the escarpment. Both the Twrch Sandstone and Farewell Rock have been quarried on a small scale in the past alongside the B4560 Beaufort Road with larger quarries in the latter once operating near the hill's southwestern corner.

== Access ==
The B4560 road from Garnllydan to Llangynidr cuts across the high moorland and offers the easiest access to the hill and to Mynydd Llangynidr to its west. Almost the entire hill is designated as urban common and was mapped as open country under the provisions of the Countryside and Rights of Way Act 2000 and therefore freely available for walkers to roam at will. There are few defined paths though a public footpath crosses from north to south passing just east of the top known as Twr Pen-cyrn. The former tramways mentioned above also provide easy level access around the margins of the hill.
