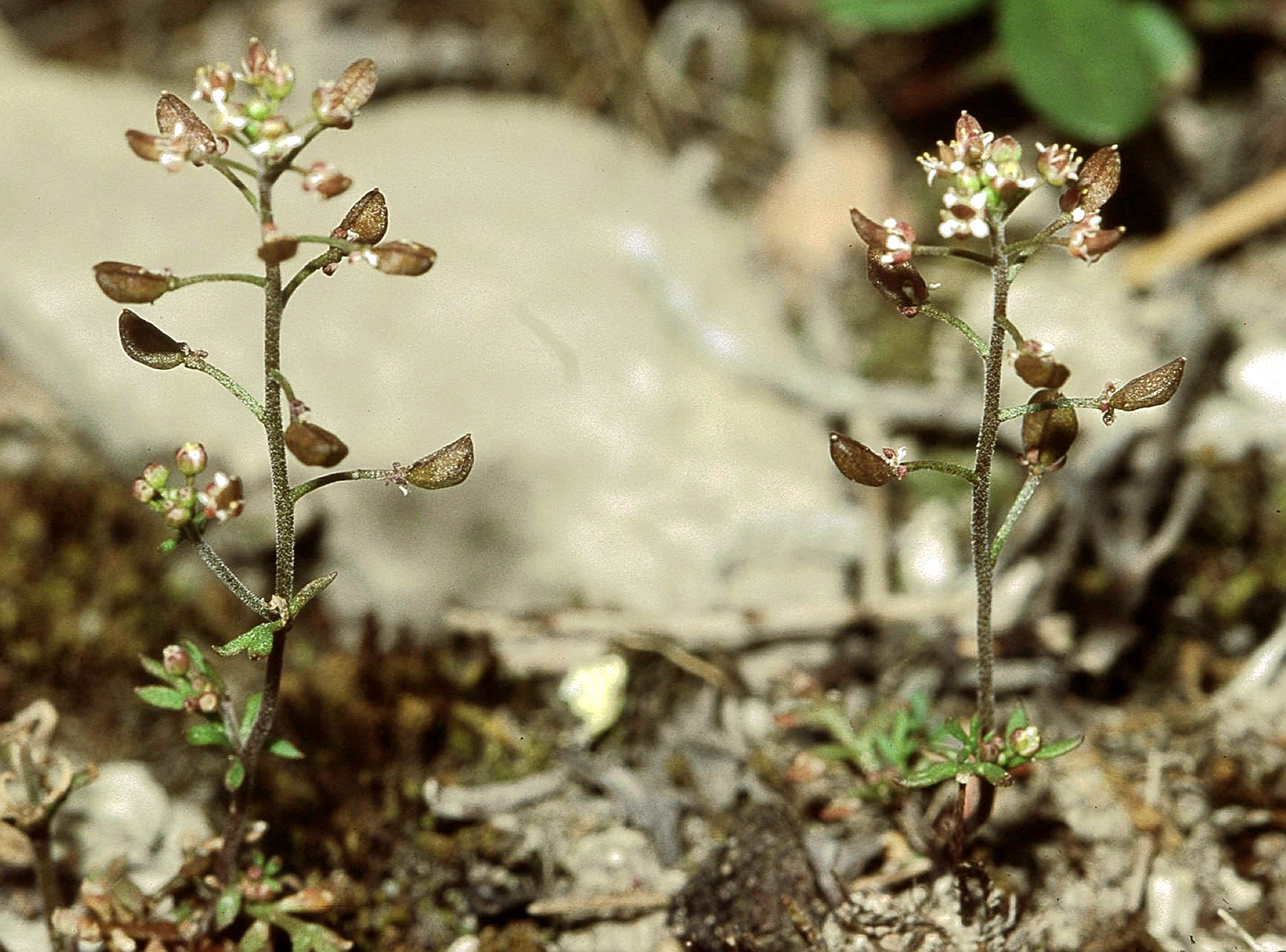

Scientific classification
- Kingdom: Plantae
- Clade: Tracheophytes
- Clade: Angiosperms
- Clade: Eudicots
- Clade: Rosids
- Order: Brassicales
- Family: Brassicaceae
- Genus: Hornungia
- Species: H. petraea

Binomial name
- Hornungia petraea (L.) Rchb.

= Hornungia petraea =

Species of flowering plant

Hornungia petraea (also Hutchinsia petraea) is a small flowering plant in the family Brassicaceae. It is native to Europe and parts of North Africa and the Middle East.
