= Ogof Craig a Ffynnon =

Cave in Clydach Gorge, Wales

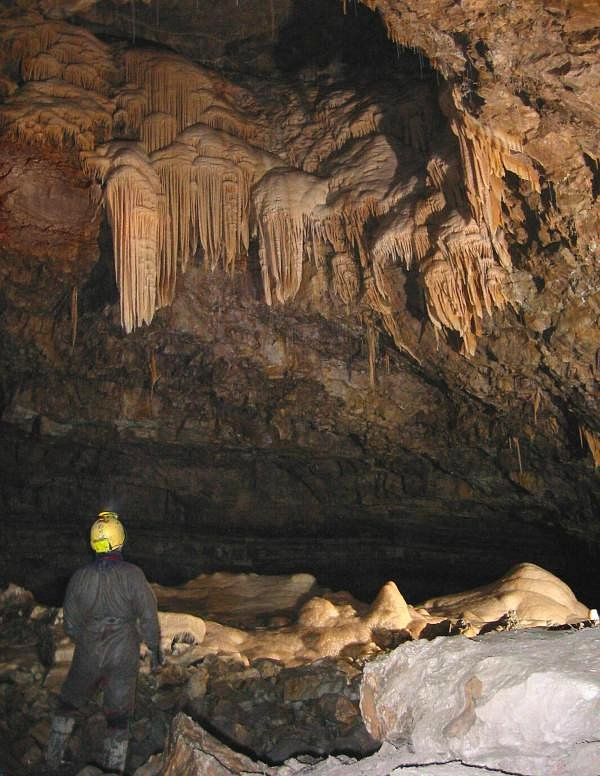
- Speleothems in Hall of the Mountain King
- Interactive map of Ogof Craig a Ffynnon
- Location: South Wales
- Coordinates: 51.8090°N 3.1328°W
- Length: 7 kilometres (4 mi)
- Access: Mynydd Llangatwg Cave Management and Advisory Committee
- Translation: Cave [of] the Rock and Spring (Welsh)

Ogof Craig a Ffynnon (Welsh for "Cave [of the] Rock and Spring") is a cave in Wales. The cave is about 7 km in length and is located at the base of a quarried rockface in the Clydach Gorge. Water flowing out of the cave is a resurgence of water draining off Llangatock Mountain above.

== History ==
The cave was discovered in 1976 by Jeff Hill, John Parker and Bill Gascoine, who had been searching for years for the way in to an underground system that they knew existed to account for the water which resurged in the locality, giving its name to the Rock and Fountain Inn on the road below. The entrance is at the bottom of a quarried rock face in the disused Daren Ddu Quarry, in the flanks of the Llangatock Mountain.

== The cave ==
The cave is about 7 km (4 mi) in length and is renowned as one of the best-decorated caves in Wales. It contains some early short crawling sections (and what is known as an arduous and uncomfortable boulder choke) and wet passages with voluminous quantities of mud before developing into a series of large sections lavishly decorated with mud and calcite formations. The most spectacular of these is the Hall of the Mountain King, a large cavern adorned with flowstone. The Promised Land is a long, linear passage section with a small stream.

Beyond the well-decorated section, the cave continues in a long series of low passages. It is thought that the cave will eventually be connected to the theoretical Llangattock System through Ogof y Daren Cilau. All the passages in Ogof Craig a Ffynnon occur in the Gilwern oolite which is located below the Llanelly Formation. The resurgences from the cave all occur in this oolite layer or the shales just above and there is evidence that there is plenty of waterflow, from much of Mynydd Llangatwg, emerging in the Pwll y Cwm oolite, which is the resurgence for Ogof y Daren Cilau.

== Access information ==
The cave can be approached from just above the old Rock and Fountain Inn on the Heads of the Valleys Road where there is a blocked layby beside some lime kilns. An old tramroad track leads from here to the Darren Ddu Quarry. The entrance to the cave is at the foot of a rock face and is barred to prevent casual access and vandalism.

Since November 2004, access to the cave has been controlled by the Mynydd Llangatwg Cave Management and Advisory Committee. This means a key must be obtained to gain access through the gate, and the log book should be signed. Round trips to the "Hall of the Mountain King" take about two and a half hours while those to the "Promised Land" take six hours. There is a fixed ladder at the first boulder choke and climbing aids at the second boulder choke, but otherwise cavers need to provide their own tackle. The cave sometimes floods, with a sump forming beyond the first boulder choke.

== See also ==
- Daren Cilau
- Ogof Draenen
