= Flitcroft =

Flitcroft is a surname. Notable people with the surname include:

- David Flitcroft (born 1974), English assistant football manager and former professional footballer, brother of Garry
- Garry Flitcroft (born 1972), English football manager and former professional footballer
- Henry Flitcroft (1697–1769), English architect in the Palladian style
- John Flitcroft (1914–1994), British cleric and academic
- Maurice Flitcroft (1929–2007), British amateur golfer and hoaxer

== See also ==
- Re Exchange Banking Co, also known as Flitcroft's case, an 1882 UK company law case
