= University of Manchester Library =

Academic library system of the University of Manchester

Coordinates: 53°27′52″N 2°14′08″W

The University of Manchester Library
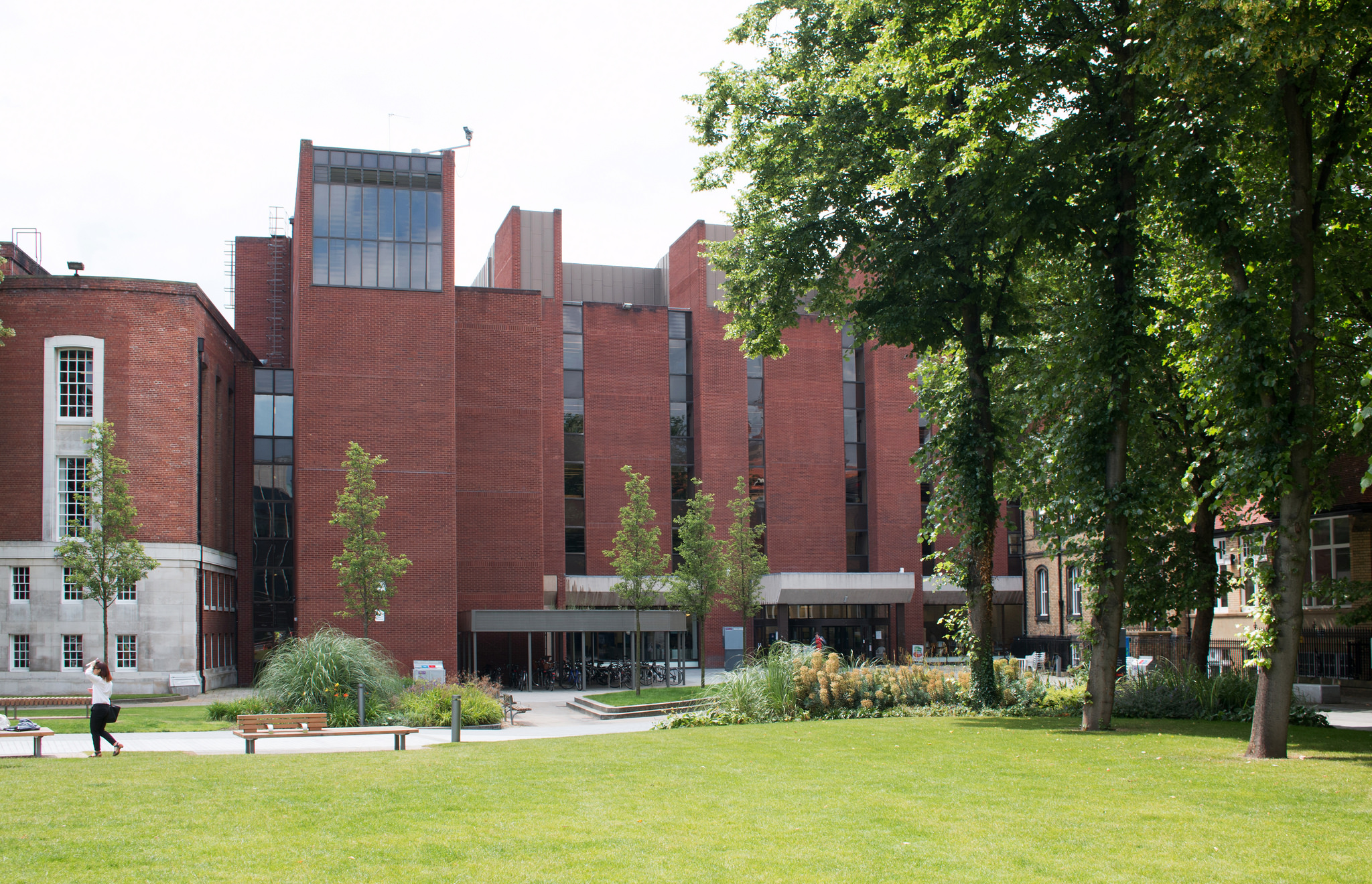
- Main library looking towards the entrance from Burlington Street
- Location: Oxford Road, Manchester, England
- Type: Academic library
- Established: 1851
- Branches: 10

Collection
- Items collected: Books, journals, newspapers, magazines, sound and music recordings, maps, prints, drawings and manuscripts
- Size: Over 4 million items

Access and use
- Population served: Greater Manchester and worldwide
- Members: The University of Manchester (and some other groups on application)

Other information
- Director: Christopher Pressler
- Employees: 300+
- Website: library.manchester.ac.uk

The University of Manchester Library is the library system and information service of the University of Manchester. The main library is on the Oxford Road campus of the university, with its entrance on Burlington Street. There are also ten other library sites, eight spread out across the university's campus, as well as the John Rylands Library (John Rylands Research Institute and Library) on Deansgate and the Ahmed Iqbal Ullah Race Relations Resource Centre situated inside Manchester Central Library.

In 1851 the library of Owens College was established at Cobden House on Quay Street, Manchester. This later became the Manchester University Library (of the Victoria University of Manchester) in 1904. In July 1972 this library merged with the John Rylands Library to become the John Rylands University Library of Manchester (JRULM).

On 1 October 2004 the library of the Victoria University of Manchester merged with the Joule Library of UMIST forming the John Rylands University Library (JRUL). The Joule Library was the successor of the library of the Manchester Mechanics' Institute (established in 1824) which later became the library of the University of Manchester Institute of Science & Technology (UMIST). One of the institute's first actions was to establish a library, with a full-time librarian, at premises in King Street, Manchester. The library changed its name in the summer of 2012 to become The University of Manchester Library.

The library is one of only five National Research Libraries – an award of the Higher Education Funding Council for England (HEFCE), and the only one in the north of England. It is a member of the North West Academic Libraries consortium (NoWAL) and of Research Libraries UK consortium (RLUK). RLUK was formerly the Consortium of University Research Libraries (CURL) of which the library was a founder member in the 1980s.

The present university librarian and director, Christopher Pressler, is assisted by an executive team of one archivist and three librarians.

== Contents ==
The library has the largest non-legal deposit academic collection in the United Kingdom, the largest collection of electronic resources of any library in the UK and supports all subject areas taught by the university. The library provides its members with a range of services and materials, including an extensive collection of electronic resources. A range of services is provided for members of the public and schools.

== Library buildings ==
The main building is on Burlington Street, west of Oxford Road: (building no. 55 on the university's Campus Guide): its oldest part is the east wing built in 1936: it was extended by south and west wings in 1953–56 and by the Muriel Stott Hall in 1978. Until 1965 it was known as the Arts Library. The Christie Building contained the library's scientific section and the medical library was in a separate building until 1981. An extension to the north designed by architects Dane, Scherrer & Hicks opened in 1981. (It had been designed in 1972 as the first instalment of a larger building.) The University of Manchester Library has a number of site libraries in other University buildings, including the Eddie Davies Library in the Alliance Manchester Business School, the Stopford Library in the Stopford Building, the Alan Gilbert Learning Commons (a student-centred, wholly digital, library named after Professor Alan Gilbert, the University’s former President and Vice-Chancellor), and the Art and Archaeology Library.

Notable collections housed in the main library are the Guardian Archives, the Manchester Collection of local medical history, maps and plans, and the Christian Brethren Archive. For many years the main library housed the offices of the Manchester Medical Society which had accommodation in the university since 1874.

Between summer 2009 and January 2010 part of the ground floor of the main library was refurbished.

== History ==
=== 1824–1851 ===
The library is made up of collections brought together on various occasions: These are the library of the Manchester Mechanics' Institute, established in 1824; the library of the Manchester Medical Society, established in 1834; the library of the Manchester Royal Infirmary from the 1750s to the late 19th century; and the Radford Library from Saint Mary's Hospital, Manchester (early obstetrical and gynaecological literature collected by surgeon Thomas Radford). (The two latter collections were donated to the Medical Library in 1917 and 1927 respectively.) The library of the Manchester Mechanics' Institute was the original library which eventually became the UMIST Library (Joule Library) which was merged with the John Rylands University Library in October 2004.

=== 1851–1936 ===
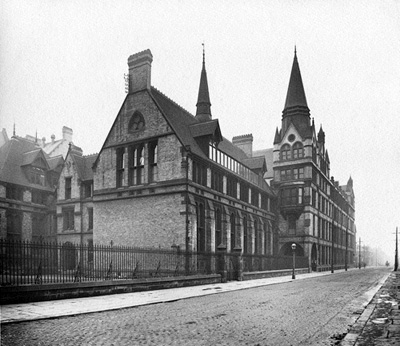
The first home of the Medical School in Coupland Street, Chorlton on Medlock (as seen in 1908 looking west) The medical library was accommodated here, 1874–1981

Owens College was founded in 1851 and the college library began with donations from James Heywood (1,200 volumes) and William Charles Henry in the first year. The first large addition to stock was the library of James Prince Lee, bishop of Manchester, 7,000 volumes in 1869 and then a further instalment. The collection contained theology, church history and fine art. Over the following 30 years, many additions were made such as the personal libraries of E. A. Freeman (6,000 volumes) and Robert Angus Smith (4,000 volumes). In 1904 the Owens College Library became the Manchester University Library when the college merged with the Victoria University of Manchester which had been so named in 1903. The library had three locations in its early years, Cobden's House on Quay Street, the John Owens Building between 1873 and 1898 and the Christie Building from autumn 1898. From 1903 the librarian (Charles Leigh) improved the administration of the library by introducing the Dewey Decimal Classification and higher cataloguing standards. On the death of Richard Copley Christie the library received his personal library of over 8,000 volumes including many rare books from the Renaissance period. By 1933 the Christie Library's stock amounted to 256,000 volumes. In 1936 the library was divided into two when the Arts Library opened on Lime Grove. Thereafter the Christie Building contained only scientific and technical literature. The medical school had its own library founded in 1834 as the library of the Manchester Medical Society accommodated in Owens College once the Medical School was established there in 1874 and on its centenary in 1934 was enriched by the Manchester Collection of E. Bosdin Leech relating to the medical history of the Manchester district. From 1919 the Deaf Education collection was established and was significantly enlarged by Abraham Farrar's bequest.

=== 1936–present ===
==== Moses Tyson ====
For the first thirty years of this period the librarian was Moses Tyson (1897–1969) who had previously been keeper of western manuscripts at the John Rylands Library in Manchester. He was a historian and the first University Librarian to be a member of the University Senate. The building of a new Arts Library meant that the stock had to be divided into two groups of subjects: arts and social sciences, and science and technology. The latter subjects remained in the original Christie Library though in areas of overlap there was some duplicating of entries in the library catalogues to assist the readers. By the early 1950s the stock had grown to such a size that the arts library building needed to be extended. This had been foreseen by the architects and once funds were available the building of two new wings in a similar style was undertaken between 1953 and 1957 (however the pattern of reading and stack rooms in the three wings is not the same). Features such as an exhibition hall and a department of special collections were included in the design together with improvements in the administrative accommodation. New departments had been established in the university by this time and these meant that the library extended its coverage in areas such as American studies, history of art, music and Near Eastern studies.

==== Frederick Ratcliffe to Christopher Pressler ====
After Tyson's retirement in 1965, F. W. Ratcliffe was appointed librarian and a period of further expansion followed which included an ambitious acquisitions policy, the beginnings of library computerisation and better liaison with the academic departments. He had a major role, with Sir William Mansfield Cooper, the vice-chancellor until 1970, in the successful merger of the John Rylands Library with the Manchester University Library on 19 July 1972. An additional extension was planned about this time though it was not built until eight years later as funding was not then available. The extension was planned as a rectangular block, in two unequal parts (the second part was never built). Before the extension could be built congestion in the library building had to be alleviated by moving some stock to other locations on the campus. The benefaction of Muriel Stott, an honorary governor of the John Rylands Library, enabled the building of a tent-like octagonal hall next to the library, the Muriel Stott Conference Centre (on the building of the extension this was enclosed by the rest of the library). The design of the extension was modified when actually implemented in 1979 so that a link section united it with the three-wing existing library building. This new extension opened in the autumn term of 1981 and at the same time the medical and science (Christie) libraries were vacated so that a more coherent organisation of stock became possible. By the time this building opened Ratcliffe had left to be the University Librarian at Cambridge.

Ratcliffe was succeeded in 1981 by Dr Michael Pegg, formerly Librarian of the University of Birmingham, who remained until he resigned on grounds of ill health in 1991. He was followed by Christopher J. Hunt (formerly Social Sciences sub-librarian at Manchester) who later became university librarian of James Cook University, Townsville, Queensland, and of La Trobe University, both in Australia, and, after returning to the UK, librarian of the British Library of Political and Economic Science, London. On Mr Hunt's retirement, William G. Simpson, librarian of Trinity College, Dublin, was appointed. Mr Simpson had previously been Acting Deputy Librarian of the John Rylands University Library of Manchester until 1985 and subsequently university librarian of the Universities of London and Surrey. Mr. Simpson remained until his retirement in December 2007. During the period 2004–07 a major refurbishment of the historic John Rylands Library in the centre of Manchester, together with the construction of new visitor centre, was completed, whilst the Library as a whole merged with the libraries of UMIST and the Manchester Business School to create The John Rylands University Library, University of Manchester. Following Mr. Simpson's retirement in 2007, Jan Wilkinson (then Head of Higher Education at the British Library and formerly University Librarian and Keeper of the Brotherton Collection at the University of Leeds and Deputy Librarian at the London School of Economics) was appointed as University Librarian and Director of The John Rylands Library, taking up the post in January 2008. In 2019, Christopher Pressler, formerly University Librarian of Dublin City University, the University of London and the University of Nottingham was appointed John Rylands University Librarian and Director of The University of Manchester Library.

=== Former librarians ===
Notable librarians of the library before 1972 were Charles W. E. Leigh (1903–1935), Moses Tyson (1935–1965) and Frederick William Ratcliffe (formerly assistant librarian, librarian 1965–1980) whose years of service amount to a total of 78 years. George Wilson was librarian of the Medical Library for over 50 years.
