= Henry Fishwick =

British soldier, politician and antiquary

Lt-Col Henry Fishwick JP FSA FRHistS
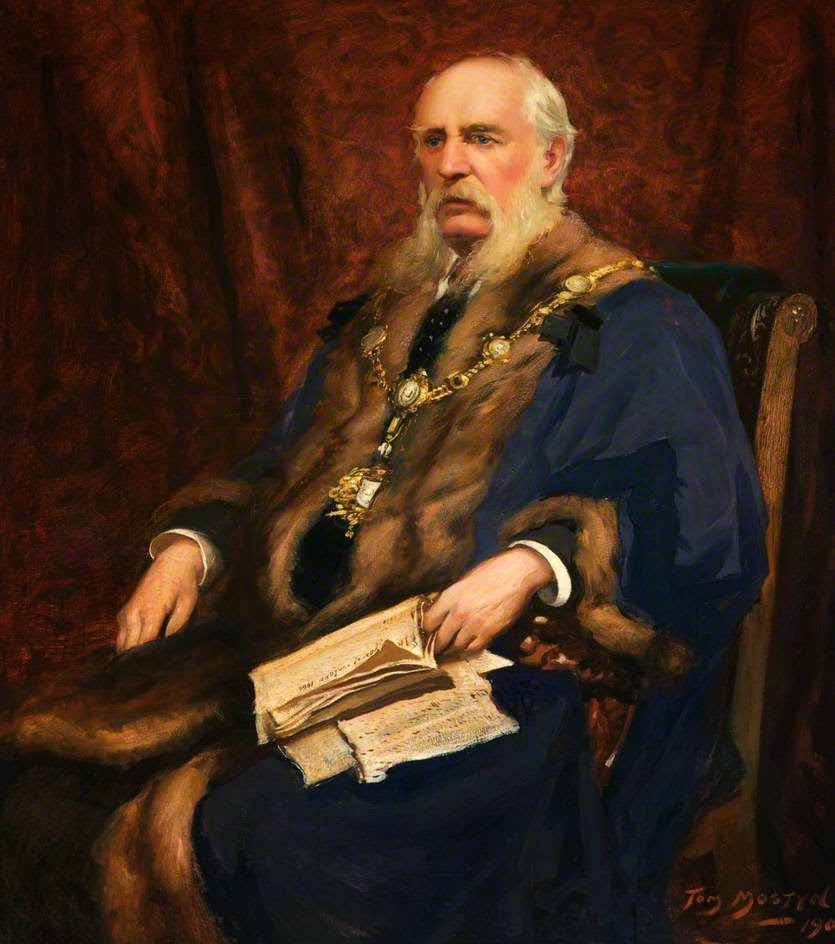
- Portrait of Henry Fishwick (1906) by Thomas Edwin Mostyn

Mayor of Rochdale
- In office 1903–1905
- Preceded by: Sir James Duckworth
- Succeeded by: Sir James Jones

Councillor for Rochdale
- In office 1871–1914

Personal details
- Born: 9 March 1835 Rochdale, Lancashire
- Died: 23 September 1914 (aged 79) Rochdale, Lancashire
- Party: Liberal Party
- Occupation: Soldier; Politician; Antiquary

Military service
- Branch/service: British Army; (United Kingdom) Volunteer Force
- Years of service: 1860–1902
- Rank: Lieutenant-Colonel (1871)
- Unit: Volunteer Force
- Commands: Eighth (King's) Regiment

Lt-Col Henry Halliwell Fishwick JP FSA FRHistS (9 March 1835 – 23 September 1914) was a British soldier, politician and antiquary. After a military career, he became a Liberal Party Councillor (1871–1914) and twice Mayor of Rochdale (1903–1905). He was also author and editor of several books on Lancashire and was a founding member of three of the county's historical societies.

== Background ==
Fishwick was the son of Henry Halliwell Fishwick (1800–72) of Brownhill, Rochdale, and his wife Jane Fishwick (1800–64), and was born on 9 March 1835. At the age of eighteen, he became the secretary of the Rochdale branch of the Young Men's Christian Association. He was a prominent Freemason: being admitted, passed, and raised as a Master Mason in the Lodge of Harmony No. 298, Rochdale. At the age of twenty-two in 1857–58, he was elected as Worshipful Master of the Lodge, and was involved in preparations for the Lodge's relocation to new rooms in Ann Street, Rochdale in 1859.

== Soldier ==
Fishwick was one of the earliest supporters of the Volunteer Force movement in Rochdale and, when a corps was formed, he joined as a Lieutenant (1860). He was later promoted to Major, and then commanding officer. From 1871, as lieutenant colonel, he was attached to the Eighth (King's) Regiment (stationed in Salford).

== Politician ==
Fishwick entered local politics in 1871, when he was elected to Rochdale Town Council. He served as a Liberal Party Councillor (1871–1914), and was Chairman of the Library and Art Gallery Committee (from 1881). He was a Member of the School Board (1870–1903) from its formation to its abolition, serving as chairman (from 1897), and then a Member of its successor, the Education Committee (1903–14), serving as chairman. In 1909, he was elected President of the Association of Education Committees of England and Wales.

He was twice elected Mayor of Rochdale (in 1903–04 and 1904–05), also serving as a borough magistrate and county JP for Lancashire. In 1906, he was honoured with the Honorary Freedom of the borough, and was known as the ‘Father of the Council’. In 1911, Fishwick was honoured by a Public testimonial presented by Lord Sheffield.

== Antiquary ==
Fishwick was a frequent contributor of papers on various subjects to Transactions of Rochdale Literary and Scientific Society (1880–6) and Transactions of Lancashire and Cheshire Antiquarian Society (1884–1910). He edited several volumes for the Chetham Society and Record Society of Lancashire and Cheshire, and was the author of several parish histories: Goosnargh (1871), Kirkham (1874), Garstang (1878–79), Rochdale (1889), as well as other works.

Fishwick was a member of several societies: Manchester Arts Club (Founding Member and chairman); Chetham Society (Council Member, 1875–1901, and Vice-President, 1901–14); Rochdale Literary and Scientific Society (Founder Member (1878), President and Vice-President); Record Society of Lancashire and Cheshire (Founder Member, Vice-President, 1878–95, 1904–14, and President, 1895–1904); Historic Society of Lancashire and Cheshire (Council Member, 1880–1914); Lancashire and Cheshire Antiquarian Society (founding member, Council Member, 1883–1914, Vice-President, and President, 1897–98); and Lancashire Parish Register Society (founding member and President, 1897–1914). He was elected a Fellow of the Society of Antiquaries and the Royal Historical Society.

== Family ==
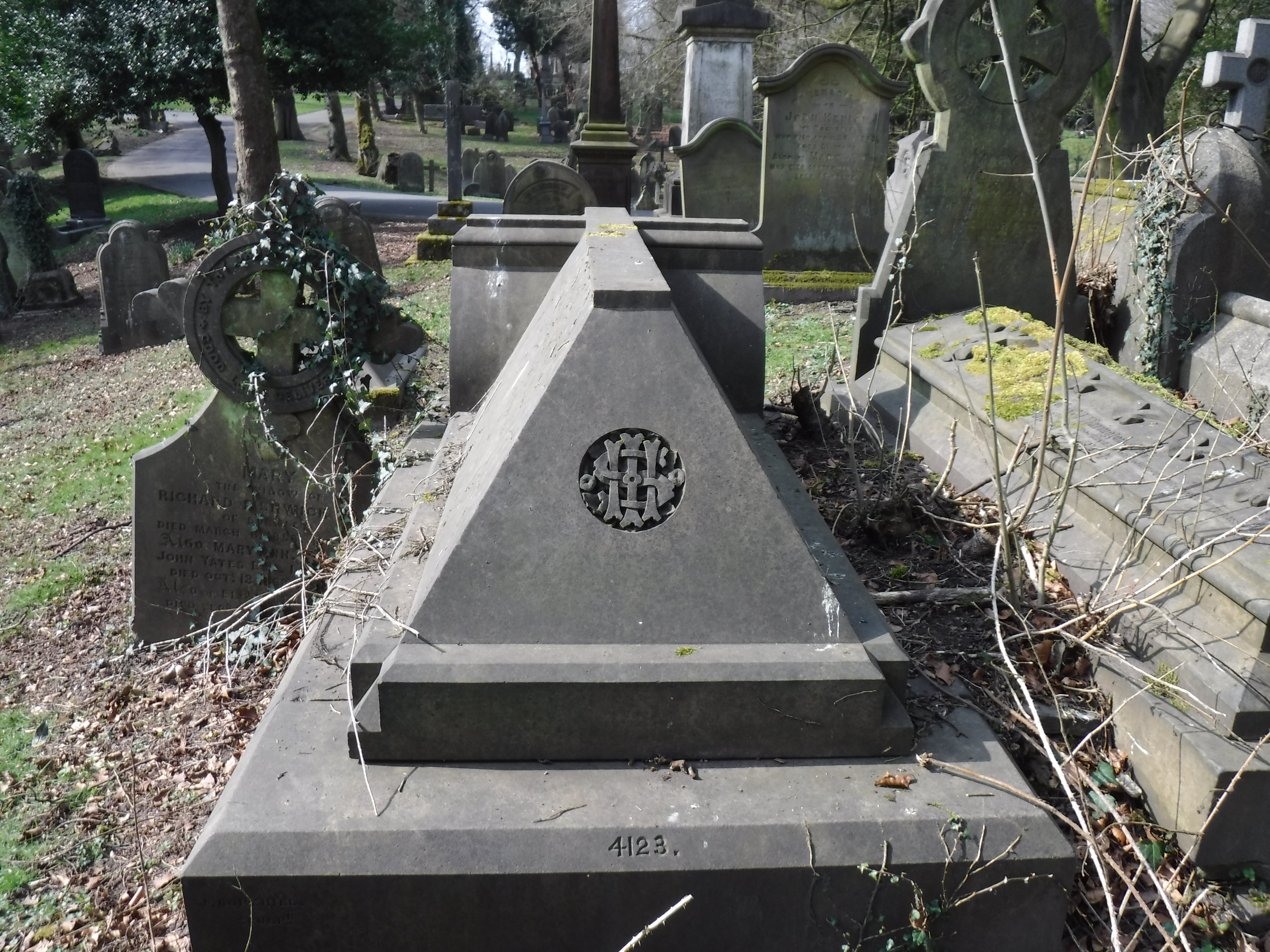
Fishwick Tomb, Rochdale Cemetery

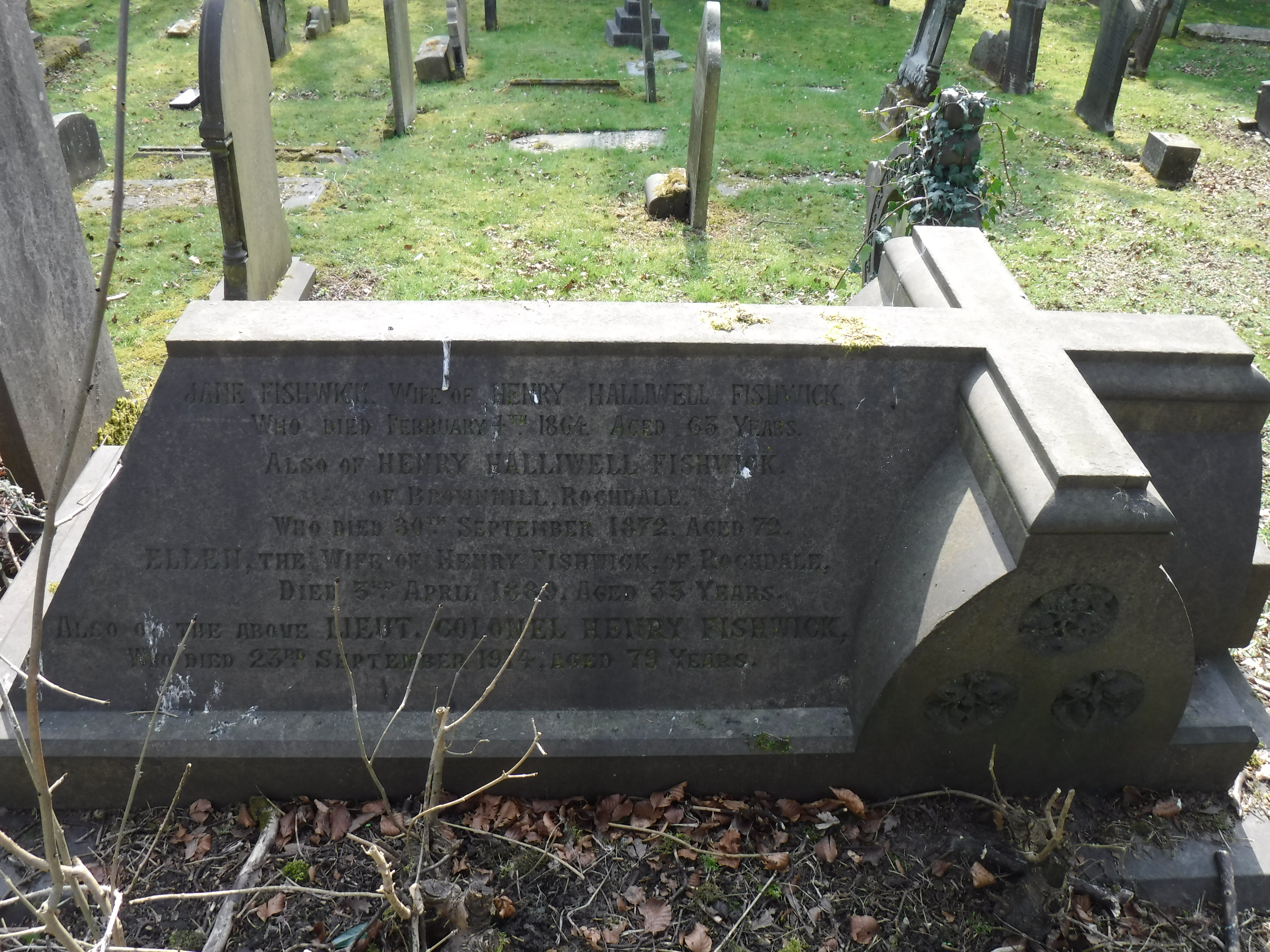
Fishwick Tomb, Rochdale Cemetery

Fishwick married Ellen Bullmore (1836–89), the daughter of Dr W. H. Bullmore of Truro, Cornwall, and they had four children: one son, James Halliwell Fishwick (who emigrated to Canada) and three daughters, Caroline, Henrietta (1861–1931), and Janet (1864–1944). Fishwick lived at The Heights, Rochdale until his death on 23 September 1914. The funeral service was followed by his interment at Rochdale Cemetery on 26 September 1914. Probate for Fishwick's estate (valued at £3,013 4s. 7d.) was granted at Manchester, on 16 October 1914, to his daughters Henrietta and Janet and the insurance agent Thomas Southall Parker. On her death in 1944, his daughter Janet bequeathed to the John Rylands Library, Manchester, a collection of deeds and documents relating to Rochdale and other districts and counties from 1541 to 1822 which now form the Fishwick Deeds in the Rylands Charters (RYCH/4613–4702).

== Select bibliography ==
Books

- Fishwick, H.H. (1871), The History of the parochial Chapelry of Goosnargh in the County of Lancaster, Goosnargh: C. Simms
- Fishwick, H.H. (1874), The History of the Parish of Kirkham in the County of Lancaster, Old Series, vol. 92, Chetham Society
- Fishwick, H.H. (1875), The Lancashire Library: A Bibliographical Account of Books on Topography, Biography, History, Science, and Miscellaneous Literature relating to the County Palatine, including an Account of Lancashire Tracts, Pamphlets, and Sermons printed before the year 1720, London: Routledge and Sons
- Fishwick, H.H. (1878), Lancashire and Cheshire Church Surveys 1649–1655, vol. 1, Record Society of Lancashire and Cheshire
- Fishwick, H.H. (1878), History of the Parish of Garstang in the County of Lancaster: Part I, Old Series, vol. 104, Chetham Society
- Fishwick, H.H. (1879), History of the Parish of Garstang in the County of Lancaster: Part II, Old Series, vol. 105, Chetham Society
- Fishwick, H.H. (1880), The Bibliography of Rochdale as illustrated by the Books in the local Free Public Library, Manchester: Ireland and Co.
- Fishwick, H.H. (1884), A Genealogical Memorial of the family of Fielden, of Todmorden, in the counties of York and Lancaster; with appendices of abstracts of parish registers, wills, monumental inscriptions, and original documents; together with notices of the family in Newark in county of Nottingham, and in various parts of Lancashire and Yorkshire, London: Mitchell and Hughes
- Fishwick, H.H. (1884), A list of Lancashire wills proved in the Archdeaconry of Richmond 1547 to 1680], vol. 10, Record Society of Lancashire and Cheshire
- Fishwick, H.H.; Fishwick, Caroline (1885), A Calendar of Lancashire and Cheshire Exchequer Depositions by Commission, 1558–1702, vol. 11, Record Society of Lancashire and Cheshire
- Fishwick, H.H. (1885), The History of the Parish of Poulton-le-Fylde, in the County of Lancaster, New Series, vol. 8, Chetham Society
- Fishwick, H.H. (1886), A list of Lancashire wills proved in the Archdeaconry of Richmond 1681 to 1748, vol. 13, Record Society of Lancashire and Cheshire
- Fishwick, H.H.; Cope, Gilbert; Chester, Joseph Lemuel (1887), Genealogy of the Sharpless family, descended from John and Jane Sharples, settlers near Chester, Pennsylvania, 1682: together with some account of the English ancestry of the family, including the researches by Henry Fishwick, P.H.S., and the late Joseph Lemuel Chester, L.L.D.; and a full report of the bi-centennial reunion of 1882, Philadelphia
- Fishwick, H.H. (1887), The History of the Parish of Bispham, in the County of Lancaster, New Series, vol. 10, Chetham Society
- Fishwick, H.H. (1888), Registers of the Parish Church of Rochdale, in the County of Lancaster, 1582–1616, Rochdale: J. Clegg
- Fishwick, H.H. (1889), Registers of the Parish Church of Rochdale, in the County of Lancaster, 1617–41, Rochdale: J. Clegg
- Fishwick, H.H. (1889), The History of the Parish of Rochdale in the County of Lancaster, Rochdale
- Fishwick, H.H. (1891), A List of Lancashire Wills proved in the Archdeaconry of Richmond, 1748 to 1790, vol. 23, Record Society of Lancashire and Cheshire
- Fishwick, H.H. (1891), The History of the Parish of St Michael-on-Wyre in the County of Lancaster; with an Appendix containing a Transcript of the Registers of the Chapelry of Woodplumpton for 1604 to 1613, New Series, vol. 25, Chetham Society
- Fishwick, H.H. (1894), A History of Lancashire, London: E. Stock
- Fishwick, H.H. (1894), The Note Book of The Rev. Thomas Jolly, A.D. 1671–1693, New Series, vol. 33, Chetham Society
- Fishwick, H.H. (1896), Pleadings and Depositions in the Duchy Court of Lancaster: Part 1: Henry VII and Henry VIII, vol. 32, Record Society of Lancashire and Cheshire
- Fishwick, H.H. (1897), Pleadings and Depositions in the Duchy Court of Lancaster: Part 2: Henry VIII, vol. 35, Record Society of Lancashire and Cheshire
- Fishwick, H.H. (1899), Pleadings and Depositions in the Duchy Court of Lancaster: Part 3: Edward VI and Philip & Mary, vol. 40, Record Society of Lancashire and Cheshire
- Fishwick, H.H. (1900), History of the Parish of Preston in Amounderness in the County of Lancaster, Rochdale: J. Clegg
- Fishwick, H.H. (1900), A Genealogical Memorial of the family of Buckley of Derby and Saddleworth in the counties of Derby and York: with appendices, abstract of wills, chancery proceedings, inquisitions post mortem, &c
- Fishwick, H.H. (1900), The Registers of the Parish Church of Croston in the County of Lancaster, 1538–1727, vol. 6, Lancashire Parish Register Society
- Fishwick, H.H.; Ditchfield, P.H. (1901), Memorials of Old Lancashire, London: Bemrose and Sons Ltd
- Fishwick, H.H. (1904), The Registers of the Parish Church of Croston in the County of Lancaster, 1691–1727, vol. 20, Lancashire Parish Register Society
- Fishwick, H.H. (1906), Rochdale Jubilee: A Record of Fifty Years' Municipal Work, 1856 to 1906
- Fishwick, H.H. (1907), The History of the Parish of Lytham in the County of Lancaster, New Series, vol. 60, Chetham Society
- Fishwick, H.H. (1913), A List of the Lancashire wills proved within the archdeaconry of Richmond and now preserved in the probate, court at Lancaster, from 1793 to 1812, also a list of the wills proved in the Peculiar of Halton, from 1793 to 1812, vol. 66, Record Society of Lancashire and Cheshire
- Fishwick, H.H. (1913), The Survey of the Manor of Rochdale in the County of Lancaster, Parcel of the Possessions of The Rt Worshipful Sir Robert Heath, Knt, His Majesty's Attorney-General, made in 1626, New Series, vol. 71, Chetham Society

Articles

- Fishwick, H.H. (1877), "Lancashire in the Time of Elizabeth", Transactions of the Royal Historical Society, 6: 183–202, doi:10.2307/3677988, JSTOR 3677988
- Fishwick, H.H. (1884), "Heralds' Visitations of Lancashire", Transactions of the Lancashire and Cheshire Antiquarian Society, 2
- Fishwick, H.H. (1886), "On Rochdale Church", Transactions of the Lancashire and Cheshire Antiquarian Society, 4
- Fishwick, H.H. (1887), "Quaker Lancashire Literature of the Seventeenth Century", Transactions of the Lancashire and Cheshire Antiquarian Society, 5
- Fishwick, H.H. (1891), "On a Find of Roman Coins at Heywood", Transactions of the Lancashire and Cheshire Antiquarian Society, 9
- Fishwick, H.H. (1892), "Notes from an Unpublished MS.", Transactions of the Lancashire and Cheshire Antiquarian Society, 10
- Fishwick, H.H. (1892), "Tonge Hall", Transactions of the Lancashire and Cheshire Antiquarian Society, 10
- Fishwick, H.H. (1893), "On an Ancient Font at Rochdale", Transactions of the Lancashire and Cheshire Antiquarian Society, 11
- Fishwick, H.H. (1895), "On Tim Bobbin versus John Whitaker", Transactions of the Lancashire and Cheshire Antiquarian Society, 13
- Fishwick, H.H. (1897), "On a Disputed Boundary in Ashworth", Transactions of the Lancashire and Cheshire Antiquarian Society, 15
- Fishwick, H.H. (1901), "On Old Castles in Lancashire", Transactions of the Lancashire and Cheshire Antiquarian Society, 19
- Fishwick, H.H. (1902), "On Ashworth Chapel", Transactions of the Lancashire and Cheshire Antiquarian Society, 20
- Fishwick, H.H. (1902), "Inventories of Goods in the Churches and Chapels of Lancashire, taken in the year A.D. 1552, Edited from Materials collected by John Eglington Bailey: Part 3: Amounderness and Lonsdale Hundreds", Chetham Miscellanies I, Chetham Society, New Series, 47
- Fishwick, H.H. (1905), "On Tim Bobbin's Ancestors", Transactions of the Lancashire and Cheshire Antiquarian Society, 23
- Fishwick, H.H. (1910), "On Lancashire Possessions of Knights of St John of Jerusalem", Transactions of the Lancashire and Cheshire Antiquarian Society, 28

Civic offices
Preceded by Sir James Duckworth	Mayor of Rochdale; 1903–1905	Succeeded by Sir James Jones
Professional and academic associations
Preceded by Richard Copley Christie	President of the Record Society of Lancashire and Cheshire; 1895–1904	Succeeded by John Paul Rylands
Preceded by Creation	President of the Lancashire Parish Register Society; 1897–1914	Succeeded by John William Robinson Parker
Preceded by Spencer Cavendish, 8th Duke of Devonshire	President of the Lancashire and Cheshire Antiquarian Society; 1897–8	Succeeded by James Holme Nicholson
Preceded by Rt Rev. William Stubbs	Vice-President of the Chetham Society; 1901–14	Succeeded by Dr William Ecroyd Farrer
