= E. F. Jacob =

British historian (1894–1971)

Professor Ernest Fraser Jacob FSA FRHistS FBA
- Born: 12 September 1894
- Died: 7 October 1971 (aged 77)

Academic background
- Education: Twyford School; Winchester College; New College, Oxford

Academic work
- Era: Middle Ages
- Discipline: History
- Sub-discipline: Medieval History
- Institutions: All Souls College, Oxford; Christ Church, Oxford; University of Manchester
- Doctoral students: Penry Williams
- Notable students: A. L. Rowse

Ernest Fraser Jacob FSA FRHistS FBA (12 September 1894 – 7 October 1971) was a British medievalist and scholar who was President of the Chetham Society, Lancashire Parish Register Society and Ecclesiastical History Society.

== Education ==
He was educated at Twyford School, Winchester College, and then for a period at New College, Oxford - broken by service in World War I. He won a fellowship to All Souls College, Oxford, and taught there and at Christ Church where his pupils included A. L. Rowse.

== Professor ==
He was then professor of history at Manchester University from 1929 to 1944 before returning to Oxford as Chichele Professor of Modern History at All Souls from 1950 until 1961. He was an able academic politician, and is said to have recruited Sir Lewis Namier to Manchester by reading in his newspaper that Namier had no position, making a phone call to invite him to take a chair, and only then walking over to tell the vice-chancellor of the recruitment. Jacob was a Member of the Chetham Society, serving as a Member of Council from 1931 and as president from 1938 until 1971.

He was a Fellow of the Society of Antiquaries, Royal Historical Society and British Academy and also President of the Ecclesiastical History Society (1965–66).

== Legacy ==
Jacob is remembered as the link between the old school of 'structuralist' medievalists, including distinguished names such as William Stubbs, T. F. Tout and F. W. Maitland, and the subsequent school of more socio-political medieval historiography, to which J. S. Roskell, K.B. McFarlane and C. A. J. Armstrong belonged. His professorships at Manchester and Oxford did much to make the two schools England's academic centres for medieval studies. He also contributed the Fifteenth Century volume to the landmark Oxford History of England series.

== List of works ==
- The Legacy of the Middle Ages (Oxford University Press, 1926) co-authored with C. G. Crump
- The Holy Roman Empire (Ernest Benn, 1928) no. 9 "Benn's Sixpenny Library"
- Essays in the Conciliar Epoch (Manchester University Press, 1943)
- Henry V and the Invasion of France (The English Universities Press, 1947) "Teach Yourself History" series
- The Medieval Registers of Canterbury and York (St. Anthony's Hall, 1953)
- Italian Renaissance Studies: A Tribute to the Late Cecilia M. Ady (Faber, 1960) editor
- The Fifteenth Century 1399-1485 (Oxford University Press, 1961) volume 6 in the "Oxford History of England" series
- Archbishop Henry Chichele (Nelson, 1967)
- Essays in Later Medieval History (Manchester University Press, 1968)

Professional and academic associations
Preceded by John William Robinson Parker	President of the Chetham Society; 1938–71	Succeeded by John Smith Roskell
Preceded by John William Robinson Parker	President of the Lancashire Parish Register Society; 1938–46	Succeeded by Christopher Robert Cheney
