= Moses Tyson =

British librarian and historian (1897–1969)

- Born: 1897; Westmorland
- Died: 1969 (aged 71–72)
- Occupations: Historian; Librarian

Moses Tyson (born 1897, Westmorland; died 1969), was a British historian and librarian who was Keeper of Western Manuscripts at the John Rylands Library from 1927 to 1935 and then Librarian of the Manchester University Library from 1935 until 1965. He was the first University Librarian to be a member of the University Senate.

His successor Frederick William Ratcliffe described him as "one of the great unsung figures of the University"; according to Brian Pullan, historian of the University, Dr Tyson was "a painfully shy bachelor who shunned the company of women" and "the self-effacing, misogynistic, chain-smoking Librarian".

His friends included Sir William Watson the poet and H. B. Charlton, Professor of English Literature at the University of Manchester.

Tyson was a Member of the Chetham Society, and served as a Member of Council (1934-58) and as Secretary (1940-51). He was also a Member of the Manchester Literary and Philosophical Society.

== Works ==
- 1930 : Hand-List of the Collections of French and Italian Manuscripts in the John Rylands Library. Manchester: Manchester University Press (first published in Bulletin, vol. 14, pp. 563–609)
- 1932 : (with Henry Guppy) The French Journals of Mrs Thrale and Doctor Johnson edited from the original manuscripts in the John Rylands Library and in the British Museum. Manchester: Manchester University Press (Rylands English MSS. 617; British Museum [now British Library] Add MS 35299)
- 1937 : The Manchester University Library. Manchester: University Press
- 1941 : "The First Forty Years of the John Rylands Library" in: Bulletin of the John Rylands Library; vol. 25, pp. 46–66
- Other contributions to the Bulletin were: "Hand-list of charters, deeds and similar documents, vol. II" (vols. 17, pp. 130–77, 348–82; 18, 393–454); "Hand-list of the collection of English manuscripts, 1928" (vol. 13, pp. 152–219); additions, 1928–35 (vol. 19, pp. 230–54, 458–85); "Hand-list of additions to the collections of Latin manuscripts, 1908–28" (vol. 12, pp. 581–609); "The Spanish manuscripts" (vol. 16, pp. 188–99); "Unpublished manuscripts, papers and letters of Dr Johnson, Mrs Thrale, and their friends [Eng. MSS. 530-660]" (vol. 15, 467–88); "A review and other writings by Charles Dickens [Eng. MS. 725]" (edited by Tyson; vol. 18, 177–96).

== Footnotes ==
Professional and academic associations
Preceded by Ernest Broxap	Secretary of the Chetham Society; 1940–51	Succeeded by Rev. John Flitcroft
