= Henry Guppy =

Henry Guppy may refer to:

- Henry B. Guppy (1854–1926), British botanist
- Henry Guppy (librarian) (1861–1948), British librarian
