= William Ecroyd Farrer =

British Historian and Genealogist (1861–1924)

William Farrer
- Born: 1861
- Died: 1924 (aged 62–63)
- Education: Rugby School
- Occupation: Historian
- Spouse(s): (1) Ellen Jane Ward; (2) Eliza Boyce
- Children: 4

William Ecroyd Farrer (28 February 1861 – 17 August 1924) was an English historian and genealogist.

== Career ==
William Ecroyd was born in 1861, the son of the Conservative politician William Farrer Ecroyd and his wife Mary. He assumed the surname Farrer in order to comply with the will of father's uncle, another William Farrer, in 1896. He was educated at Rugby School, then briefly joined the family's worsted manufacturing business. He lived at Leyburn then Over Kellet, Lancashire, and finally at Witherslack, Westmorland.

Farrer's interest in Lancashire and Yorkshire genealogy led into his research on wider local history. He contributed much to local societies and their journals as he began his work on History of the Parish of North Meols. With John Brownbill as co-editor, he published eight volumes of the Victoria History of the County of Lancaster between 1906 and 1914. He also completed three volumes of Early Yorkshire Charters between 1914 and 1916.

He was a Member of the Chetham Society, served as Council Member from 1908, and then as vice-president from 1915 until his death. He was awarded an honorary degree (LittD) from the University of Manchester and was an honorary lecturer in local history in the University of Liverpool. He died in Norway.

== Family ==
Farrer married Ellen Jane Ward, daughter of Henry Ward, of Rodbaston, Staffordshire. He married for a second time to Eliza Boyce, daughter of John Boyce, of Redgrave, Suffolk. He had a daughter from his first marriage and a son and two daughters from his second marriage.

== Selected publications ==
- Feudal Cambridgeshire (1920)
- Court Rolls of the Honor of Clitheroe (3 vols, 1897–1913)
- The Chartulary of Cockersand Abbey (3 vols., Chetham Society, 1898–1909)
- Final Concords of the County of Lancaster (4 parts, Record Society of Lancashire and Cheshire, 1899–1910)
- Court Rolls of Thomas, Earl of Lancaster in the County of Lancaster (ibid., 1901)
- Lancashire Pipe Rolls and Early Charters (1902);
- Lancashire Inquests, Extents, and Feudal Aids (3 parts, Record Society of Lancashire and Cheshire, 1903–15)
- An Outline Itinerary of King Henry I (English Historical Review, 34 (1919), and reprint, Oxford)
- Records Relating to the Barony of Kendale (with J. F. Curwen, 2 vols., Cumberland and Westmorland Antiquarian and Archaeological Society, 1923–4)

Professional and academic associations
Preceded by Henry Fishwick	Vice-President of the Chetham Society; 1915–24	Succeeded by George William Daniels
