= William Fleming (doctor) =

British physician and antiquary (1799–1880)

- Born: 1799; Manchester, Lancashire, England
- Died: 1880 (aged 80–81); Chester, Cheshire, England
- Occupation: Physician

William Fleming (1799–1880) was a British physician and antiquary.

== Career ==
Fleming was the son of Thomas Fleming and was born in Manchester in 1799. He obtained his Doctor of Medicine (MD) degree and practiced as a physician in Manchester for many years. He was a member of several local societies. He was elected a Member of the Manchester Literary and Philosophical Society in 1828. He was a founding Member of the Chetham Society and served as its first Secretary from 1843 to 1852. Fleming was also one of the founders of the Manchester Botanical Gardens. He lived in Pendleton, later Kendal, and died near Chester in 1880. His archives were bequeathed to the Medical Collections at the University of Manchester Library.

== Publications ==
- Fleming, William, Report on the state of the parochial and other schools for the poor at Manchester (London, 1845).

Professional and academic associations
Preceded by Creation	Secretary of the Chetham Society; 1843–52	Succeeded by William Langton
