= J. S. Roskell =

English historian (1913–1998)

Professor J. S. Roskell FRHistS FBA
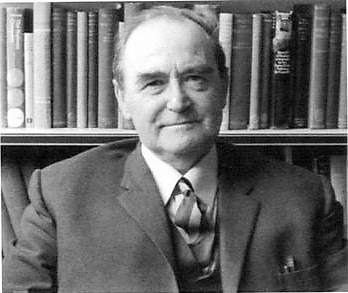
- Born: John Smith Roskell; 2 July 1913; Norden, Lancashire, England
- Died: 1 May 1998 (aged 84)
- Spouse: Evelyn Liddle (m. 1942)

Academic background
- Education: University of Manchester; Balliol College, Oxford
- Thesis: The Commons in the Parliament of 1422
- Doctoral advisor: V. H. Galbraith
- Influences: E. F. Jacob; William Abel Pantin

Academic work
- Discipline: History
- Sub-discipline: Medieval history
- Institutions: University of Nottingham; University of Manchester

John Smith Roskell FRHistS FBA (1913–1998) was an English historian of the Middle Ages.

== Biography ==
Roskell was born on 2 July 1913 in Norden, near Rochdale. He won a scholarship to Rochdale Municipal Secondary School before attending Accrington Grammar School. In 1930 he won a history scholarship for Manchester University. Here he was influenced by William Abel Pantin and E. F. Jacob, who helped Roskell gravitate towards medieval history. Roskell was taught a neo-Stubbsian method that sought to use administrative and biographical research in studying constitutional history.

He gained a first in 1933 and was awarded an MA a year later. His master's thesis was published by the Chetham Society in 1937 as The Knights of the Shire for the County Palatine of Lancaster, 1377–1460. After being awarded a Langton Fellowship in 1935, Roskell studied the Parliament of 1422 at Balliol College, Oxford, for his doctoral thesis. Under the supervision of V. H. Galbraith, he completed this in 1940 (The Commons in the Parliament of 1422) but his studies were interrupted by the Second World War. Roskell served in the Royal Navy in the Mediterranean and the North Atlantic.

Roskell returned to Manchester in 1945 and his thesis was eventually published in 1954. For ten years after 1952 he was Professor of Medieval History at the University of Nottingham before returning to the University of Manchester to take the chair of medieval history. He retired in 1978. In 1968 he was awarded a Fellowship of the British Academy.

Against the views of Albert Pollard and J. E. Neale, Roskell argued in 1964 that it was in the seventeenth century that Parliament became indispensable to the Crown, not the during the sixteenth. With Linda Clark and Carole Rawcliffe, he edited The History of Parliament that covered the House of Commons from 1386 to 1421. This work was published in four volumes in 1992.

He married Evelyn Liddle in 1942, with whom he had two children. He died on 1 May 1998.

== Works ==
- The Knights of the Shire for the County Palatine of Lancaster, 1377–1460 (Chetham Society, new ser., XCVI (1937).
- ‘Medieval Speakers for the Commons in Parliament’ Bulletin of the Institute for Historical Research, XXIII (1950).
- ‘The Office and Dignity of Protector of England, with Special Reference to its Origins’, English Historical Review, LXVIII (1953).
- The Commons in the Parliament of 1422: English Society and Parliamentary Representation under the Lancastrians (1954).
- ‘The Problem of the Attendance of the Lords in Medieval Parliaments’, Bulletin of the Institute for Historical Research, XXIX (1956).
- ‘Perspectives in English Parliamentary History’, Bulletin of the John Rylands Library, XLVI (1964), pp. 448–75.
- The Commons and their Speakers in English Parliaments, 1376–1523 (1965).
- ‘A Consideration of Certain Aspects of the English Modus Tenendi Parliamentum’, Bulletin of the John Rylands Library (1967).
- 'The Authorship and Purpose of the Gesta Henrici Quinti', Bulletin of the John Rylands Library, LIII (1970-l) and LIV (1971–72).
- (co-edited and translated with Frank Taylor), Gesta Henrici Quinti: The Deeds of Henry the Fifth (Oxford, 1975).
- Parliaments and Politics in late Medieval England (3 vols., 1981–83).
- The Impeachment of Michael de la Pole, Earl of Suffolk, in 1386 in the Context of the Reign of Richard II (1984).

Professional and academic associations
Preceded by Ernest Fraser Jacob	President of the Chetham Society; 1972–84	Succeeded by William Reginald Ward
Preceded by John Michael Wallace-Hadrill	President of the Lancashire Parish Register Society; 1962–84	Succeeded by Jeffrey Howard Denton
