= Frederick William Ratcliffe =

English philologist and librarian (1927–2026)

Frederick William Ratcliffe CBE (28 May 1927 – 16 April 2026) was an English philologist and librarian.

== Life and career ==
Ratcliffe was born in Leek on 28 May 1927.

He received a Ph.D. in German, given for his thesis on Heinrich von Mügeln at the University of Manchester.

From 1954 he was an assistant librarian or sub-librarian in the universities of Manchester, Glasgow, and Newcastle upon Tyne. He succeeded Moses Tyson as the University Librarian at Manchester in 1965. From 1972 he was additionally director of the John Rylands University Library.

In 1980 he became University Librarian at the University of Cambridge where he remained until his retirement in 1994. He was Parker Librarian at the Parker Library, Corpus Christi College from 1995 to 2000.

Ratcliffe wrote a number of papers on the subject of librarianship including the preservation of library materials.

In 1988-1989 he held the Sandars Readership in Bibliography at Cambridge speaking on "A pre-Lutheran German psalter: A case study of the fourteenth-century translation of Heinrich von Mügeln."

Ratcliffe died on 16 April 2026, aged 98.

== Selected writings ==
- 1966-1980: University of Manchester. Librarian's report, 1966–1980
- 1980: "The Scholar in the Academic Library" in: B. C. Bloomfield, ed., Middle East Studies and Libraries: a felicitation volume for Professor J. D. Pearson. London: Mansell Information Publishing; pp. 163–178
- 1980: "Archival Responsibilities of University Libraries" in Journal of Librarianship and Information Science vol. 12 (1980) pp. 71–83
- 1982: The Role of the Modern University Library. 23 pp. Darwin
- 1991: "Preservation and Scholarship in Libraries" in Library Review vol. 40 (1991) pp. 62–71
- 2007: Books, Books, Just Miles and Miles of Books: across the library counter, 1950–2000. 317 p.; 31 cm. Cambridge: F. W. Ratcliffe (unpublished autobiography, held at Cambridge University Library)
