= Bulletin of the John Rylands Library =

- Language: English

Publication details
- Former name(s): Bulletin of the John Rylands University Library of Manchester
- History: 1903–present
- Publisher: Manchester University Press (United Kingdom)
- Frequency: Biannually

Standard abbreviations
- ISO 4: Bull. John Rylands Libr.

Indexing
- ISSN: 2054-9318

Links
- Journal homepage

The Bulletin of the John Rylands Library is a journal published by Manchester University Press. Articles are meant to enhance the "scholarship and understanding" of the collections of the John Rylands Library. The journal was established in 1903, and has been published by MUP since 2014. The founding editor was Henry Guppy and from 2014 to 2017 the editor was Paul Fouracre.

Dr. Guppy began publication of the Bulletin of the John Rylands Library in 1903; it later became a journal publishing academic articles and from autumn 1972 the title was changed to the Bulletin of the John Rylands University Library of Manchester (further slight changes have occurred since). Frank Taylor (keeper of manuscripts) became the editor from 1948 to 1977. However he was not named as such until 1962. Until 1977 two numbers were published each year. Under the editorship of Clive Field this was changed to three numbers each year with one of the numbers devoted to the library's collections. For the greater part of its history the Bulletin was printed by Aberdeen University Press but this is no longer the case.
