= Lancashire Parish Register Society =

Text publication society and registered charity

- Formation: 26 November 1897; 128 years ago
- Type: Historical Society
- Registration no.: 511396
- Legal status: Charity
- Purpose: Historical Study; Research
- Headquarters: Manchester, United Kingdom
- Location: Manchester Central Library
- Region served: Lancashire; Greater Manchester
- Official language: English
- Activities: Research; Publications
- Collections: Library; Archives
- 9th President: Thomas Woodcock
- Website: www.lprs.org.uk

The Lancashire Parish Register Society is a text publication society and registered charity which was founded for the "purpose of printing the registers of the ancient parishes" in Lancashire and has published more than 175 volumes, CDs and CD-Roms since 1898.

== History ==
The society was formed at a meeting at Chetham's Library, convened by the historian Henry Fishwick, on 26 November 1897, but the year 1898 was fixed as the first year of the society's existence. The society became a registered charity (No. 511396) in 1981.

== Publications ==
Since 1898, the society has published 175 printed volumes of Lancashire's parish registers, as well as numerous CDs and CD-Roms. The society published its 175th volume in 2012.

== Membership ==
Membership is open to all individuals and institutions interested in the parish registers of the county.

== Officers ==
=== Presidents ===
- 1897–1914 Lt-Col. Henry Fishwick
- 1920–38 Col. John William Robinson Parker
- 1938–46 Prof. Ernest Fraser Jacob
- 1946–55 Prof. Christopher Robert Cheney
- 1955–62 Prof. John Michael Wallace-Hadrill
- 1962–84 Prof. John Smith Roskell
- 1984–99 Prof. Jeffrey Howard Denton
- 1999–2003 John Leslie Ogilvie Holden
- 2004–present Thomas Woodcock

=== General Editors ===
- 1976–2008 Dr Colin D. Rogers
- 2008–present Alan A. Kenwright

=== Secretaries ===
- 1897–98 Rev. W. Löwenberg
- 1898–1931 Dr Henry Brierley
- 1931–56 Archibald Sparke
- 1941–82 Dr Frank Taylor
- 1982–86 Jean M. Ayton
- 1986–89 Irene Foster
- 1989–93 R. Neil Hudson
- 1993–99 John Leslie Ogilvie Holden
- 1999–2010 Marnie Mason
- 2010–2022 R. Neil Hudson
- 2022-present Barbara Kenwright

=== Treasurers ===
- 1897–1936 John Rigg Faithwaite
- 1936–48 Dr Ernest Bosdin Leech
- 1948–77 Dr Robert Dickinson
- 1971–77 Florence Dickinson
- 1977–95 J. R. Bulmer
- 1995–2005 T. O’Brien
- 2005–08 Alan A. Kenwright
- 2008–25 Jackie Roberts
- 2025-present Kim Z Travis

== See also ==
- Chetham Society
- Historic Society of Lancashire and Cheshire
- Record Society of Lancashire and Cheshire
- Lancashire and Cheshire Antiquarian Society
