= Paul Booth (historian) =

British medieval historian (born 1946)

Paul Howson William Booth (born 4 April 1946) is a British medieval historian and teacher, specialising in the history of Cheshire in the thirteenth and fourteenth centuries, and local history of the North West. Booth is an Honorary Senior Research Fellow of the University of Keele, having previously held the same honour at the University of Liverpool from 2010 to 2012.

== Early life and education ==
Booth graduated from the Universities of Sheffield (BA, 1967), King's College London (P.G.C.E., 1968) and Liverpool (MA, 1974) where he was supervised by Professor A. R. Myers. In 2011 he was awarded the degree of Doctor of Letters of Liverpool University, in recognition of his research and publications in his specialist subjects.

== Career ==
Booth was lecturer in History at University of Liverpool from 1972 to 2010 (Senior Lecturer from 1983). He taught medieval history to undergraduates, and trained archives students in medieval palaeography and diplomatic. During this time he taught and organised University Continuing Education courses in History and Local History in the North West.

Several of Booth's classes formed themselves into local history societies, all of which have active publication programmes. He has served on the Councils of all of the regional local history societies, has been chairman of both the Cheshire Local History Committee and the Lancashire Local History Federation and was president and joint general secretary of the Chetham Society. From 2008 to 2011 he was co-director of the Arts and Humanities Research Council (AHRC)-funded project, "The Gascon Rolls, 1317–1468", jointly with Malcolm Vale of the University of Oxford.

Booth is a fellow of the Royal Historical Society, and has acted as external adviser to University of Toronto Press and the Irish Research Council, and as a peer reviewer to the AHRC.

Booth's research focus has been in the field of medieval Cheshire. His research into the financial and legal records of the county palatine has added to historical knowledge of the county, and called into question previous assumptions about agriculture, political disorder, and involvement in the royal wars in Wales, Scotland and France. In particular, he has asserted that the oppressive period of the Black Prince's rule, did not result, as had been generally accepted, the "great rebellion of 1353" (so called by Geoffrey Barraclough, second professor of Medieval History at Liverpool).

Booth's work has influenced other medieval historians; for example his study of the Black Prince's state visit to Cheshire in 1353 enabled Professor Thorlac Turville-Petre to demonstrate that the Middle English alliterative poem Winner and Waster was based on the events of that year in Cheshire. Similarly, Professor Chris Given-Wilson has stated that Booth's research on the detailed working of the mechanism of Cheshire’s government in the 1350s and 1360s has made clear the unique roles of the prince’s two successive business-managers, Sir John Wingfield and Sir John Delves.

Booth's research students have continued his work; for example, Andrew Tonkinson's monograph on Macclesfield in the later fourteenth century and the late Phyllis Hill's edition of the County Court of Chester Indictment roll, 1354 to 1377.

A group of Booth's former adult students formed themselves into the Ranulf Higden Society, which hosts lectures by medieval historians, and also organises members into research groups which are working on publishing medieval documents. The first volume of these appeared in Life, Love and Death in North East Lancashire 1510 to 1537.

In October 2012 the University of Liverpool terminated Booth's honorary fellowship because of remarks made by him on a social media site which were critical of the University.

In 2015 Booth was in the news when he discovered the apparent first known use of a now commonly used expletive, within the name of one Roger Fuckebythenavele, in the plea rolls of the Chester County Court for the years 1310–1311.

== Publications ==
- Booth, P. H. W. (1978). Burton Manor: the biography of a house. Burton. ISBN 0906402018.
- Booth, P. H. W. (1981). The Financial Administration of the Lordship and County of Chester, 1272–1377. Chetham Society 3rd ser. Vol. 28. Manchester: Manchester University Press. ISBN 978-0-7190-1337-9.
- Booth, P. H. W., ed. (1984). Burton in Wirral: a history. Burton: Burton and South Wirral Local History Society. ISBN 0950914509.
- Booth, P. H. W.; Carr, Anthony D., eds. (1991). Account of Master John de Burnham the Younger, Chamberlain of Chester, of the revenues of the counties of Chester and Flint, Michaelmas 1361 to Michaelmas 1362. Record Society of Lancashire and Cheshire. Vol. 125. Manchester: Record Society of Lancashire and Cheshire.
- Dickinson, J. Roger; Booth, P. H. W. (1996). The Lordship of Man under the Stanleys: government and economy in the Isle of Man, 1580–1704. Chetham Society 3rd ser. Vol. 41. Manchester: Chetham Society. ISBN 1859360378.
- Booth, P. H. W. (2003). Accounts of the Manor and Hundred of Macclesfield, Cheshire, Michaelmas 1361 to Michaelmas 1362. Record Society of Lancashire and Cheshire. Vol. 138. Manchester: Record Society of Lancashire and Cheshire. ISBN 0902593536.
- Booth, P. H. W. (2004). Warton in the Middle Ages (rev. ed.). Mourholme: Mourholme Local History Society. ISBN 0953429814.
- Harrop, John; Booth, P. H. W.; Harrop, Sylvia A., eds. (2005). Extent of the Lordship of Longdendale 1360: Extanta dominii de Longdendale anno xxxiiij Edward terij. Record Society of Lancashire and Cheshire. Vol. 140. Manchester: Record Society of Lancashire and Cheshire. ISBN 0902593633.
- Lynch, Margaret; Booth, P. H. W., eds. (2006). Life, Love and Death in North-East Lancashire, 1510 to 1537: A Translation of the Act Book of the Ecclesiastical Court of Whalley. Chetham Society 3rd ser. Vol. 46. Manchester: Chetham Society. ISBN 9780955427602.

Professional and academic associations
Preceded by William Reginald Ward	President of the Chetham Society; 1992–2005	Succeeded by Paul J. Fouracre
Preceded by Creation	Editor of the Chetham Society; 1991–2005	Succeeded by Timothy J. Thornton
