= John Parsons Earwaker =

English archaeologist and antiquary (1847–95)

John Parsons Earwaker FSA
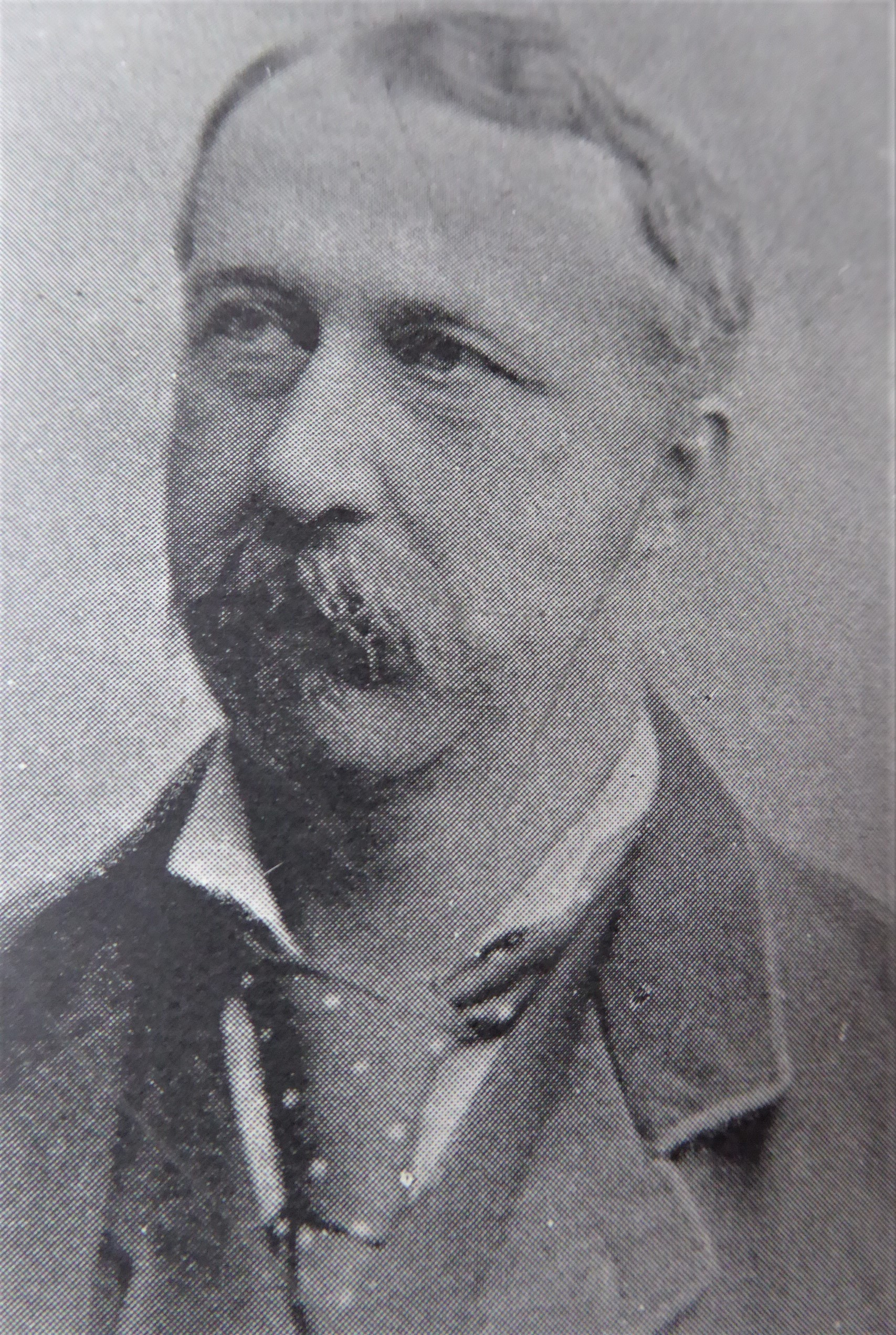
- John Parsons Earwaker
- Born: 22 April 1847; Cheetham Hill, Manchester, Lancashire, England
- Died: 29 January 1895 (aged 47); Pensarn, Abergele, Denbighshire, Wales
- Education: Owens College, Manchester; Pembroke College, Cambridge; Merton College, Oxford; Middle Temple
- Occupation: Antiquary
- Spouse: Juliet Bergman

John Parsons Earwaker (1847–1895) was an English antiquary.

== Life ==
The son of John Earwaker, he was born at Cheetham Hill, Manchester, on 22 April 1847; his father was a merchant from Hampshire, and a close friend of Richard Cobden. Educated at a private school in Alderley Edge, Cheshire, and then at school in Germany, he went on to study at Owens College, Manchester, where he took prizes in natural science. He moved to Pembroke College, Cambridge, but with a scholarship to Merton College, Oxford, he matriculated there in November 1868, and graduated B.A. in 1872 and M.A. in 1876. He entered the Middle Temple, but was never called to the bar.

Earwaker stayed at Oxford until 1874, with a few pupils there. He became interested in history and antiquarian studies, and studied ancient English manuscripts. He was elected honorary secretary of the Oxford Archaeological Society, and acted as deputy-keeper of the Ashmolean Museum in 1873–1874, during the residence of the keeper John Henry Parker in Rome. In January 1873 he was elected Fellow of the Society of Antiquaries of London.

After his marriage in 1875 Earwaker resided at Withington, near Manchester, and then in 1881 moved to Pensarn, near Abergele, North Wales. He wrote, and took part in local affairs.

Earwaker died on 29 January 1895 at Pensarn, and was buried in the old churchyard of Abergele.

== Works ==
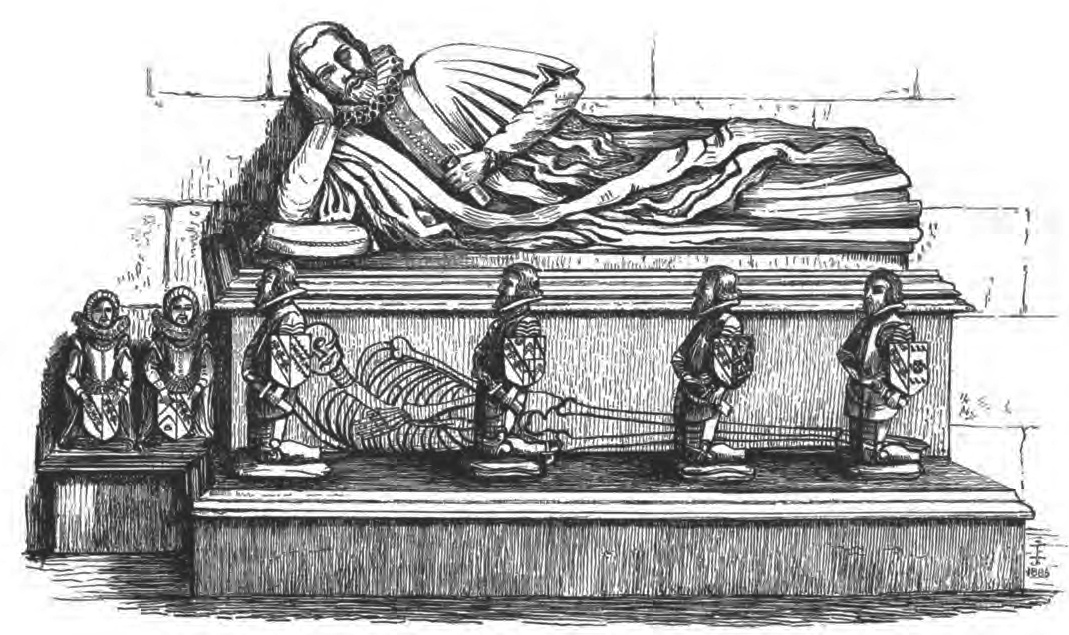
Philip Oldfield of Bradwall (1541–1616), effigy in the Church of St Mary-on-the-Hill, Chester; illustration from John Parsons Earwaker, The History of the Ancient Parish of Sandbach

In April 1875 Earwaker began the publication in the Manchester Courier of a series Local Gleanings relating to Lancashire and Cheshire, which ran until January 1878, and then was republished in two volumes. It was followed in 1878-80 by a periodical entitled Local Gleanings: an Archæological and Historical Magazine, of which one volume was completed. The first volume of his East Cheshire, Past and Present; or a History of the Hundred of Macclesfield was published in 1877, and the second in 1881.

In 1882 the corporation of Manchester decided to print the Court Leet Records of the Manor of Manchester, ranging from 1552 to 1846, and Earwaker was engaged as editor. The work, with annotations, extended to twelve royal octavo volumes, the first of which was printed in 1884, and the last in 1890. It was supplemented by The Constables' Accounts of the Manor of Manchester, from 1612 to 1647 and from 1743 to 1776, 3 vols. 1891–2. Earwaker put the Congleton corporation records into admirable order, and work on family papers resulted in monographs, as his Agecroft Hall, near Manchester, and the Old Deeds and Charters relating to it.

He was one of the founder members of the Record Society of Lancashire and Cheshire and served as secretary. He was also a Member of the Councils of the Chetham Society from 1879 to 1894, the Historic Society of Lancashire and Cheshire, the Chester Archaeological Society, and the Lancashire and Cheshire Antiquarian Society. He contributed to the publications of these societies, and he wrote also in the Athenæum, Notes and Queries, and other journals.

Other works by Earwaker included:

- Index to the Wills and Inventories at Chester from 1545 to 1760, Record Society, 1879–92, 7 vols.
- Lancashire and Cheshire Wills and Inventories, Chetham Society, 1884–93, 2 vols.
- A Lancashire Pedigree Case; or a History of the various Trials for the Recovery of the Harrison Estates from 1873 to 1886, 1887.
- The Recent Discoveries of Roman Remains found in repairing the North Wall of the City of Chester, a series of papers by various writers, edited by Earwaker, 1888.
- History of the Ancient Parish of Sandbach, 1890.
- The Cheshire Sheaf, new series, reprinted from the Chester Courant, 1891.
- History of the Church and Parish of St. Mary-on-the-Hill, Chester, completed by Rupert Hugh Morris, 1898.

== Legacy ==
Earwaker's library of printed books and manuscripts, including transcripts of original documents, was divided after his death. The Cheshire portion was purchased by Hugh Grosvenor, 1st Duke of Westminster, and presented by him to the Chester Museum. The Lancashire portion was acquired by William Farrer of Marton, near Skipton. A catalogue of the library was printed in 1895.

== Family ==
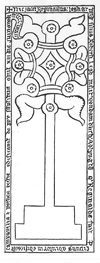
Memorial slab, illustration from History of East Cheshire by John Parsons Earwaker

Earwaker married, on 1 June 1875, Juliet, daughter of John George Bergman of Colinshays, Bruton, Somerset, and by her had three sons and three daughters. She illustrated his East Cheshire and other works.

== Notes ==
Attribution

This article incorporates text from a publication now in the public domain: Lee, Sidney, ed. (1901). "Earwaker, John Parsons". Dictionary of National Biography (1st supplement). Vol. 1. London: Smith, Elder & Co.

Professional and academic associations
Preceded by Creation	Secretary of the Record Society of Lancashire and Cheshire; 1878–94	Succeeded by William Fergusson Irvine
