= Paul Fouracre =

British medieval historian

Paul J. Fouracre is professor emeritus of medieval history at the University of Manchester. His research interests relate to early medieval history, the history of the Franks, law and custom in medieval societies, charters, hagiography and serf-lord relations in the eleventh century. His recent work on the cost of the liturgy, focusing on the social and economic effects of providing "eternal light", is a study of the interplay between belief and materiality.

Fouracre was co-ordinating editor of Early Medieval Europe from 2005 to 2009 and editor of the first volume of The New Cambridge Medieval History (2005). From 2014 to 2017 he was editor of the Bulletin of the John Rylands Library. He is a Member of the Chetham Society, serving as a Member of Council since 2004 and as President since 2005.

== Selected publications ==
- Fouracre, Paul (2021). Eternal light and earthly concerns : belief and the shaping of medieval society. Manchester, United Kingdom. ISBN 978-1-78499-301-6. OCLC 1201662202.
- The Settlement of Disputes in Early Medieval Europe, Cambridge University Press, Cambridge, 1986. ISBN 0521307880 (Edited with Wendy Davies)
- Property and Power in the Early Middle Ages. Cambridge University Press, Cambridge, 1995. ISBN 052143419X (Edited with Wendy Davies)
- Late Merovingian France: History and hagiography, 640-720, Manchester University Press, Manchester, 1996. ISBN 0719047900 (translated and edited with Richard A. Gerberding)
- The Age of Charles Martel, Longman, London, 2000. ISBN 0582064759 (Medieval World Series)
- Frankish history : studies in the construction of power. Farnham: Ashgate Variorum. 2013. ISBN 978-1-4094-5159-4. OCLC 809562997.

Professional and academic associations
Preceded by Paul H. W. Booth	President of the Chetham Society; 2005–present	Succeeded by Incumbent
