= John K. Walton =

British Historian

Professor John Kimmons Walton FRHistS

Academic background
- Education: University of Oxford; University of Lancaster

Academic work
- Discipline: Historian
- Institutions: University of Lancaster; University of Central Lancashire; Leeds Metropolitan University; University of the Basque Country

John Kimmons Walton FRHistS is a professor at the University of the Basque Country, Leioa, Spain. Walton is an expert on the history of the development of tourism, and particularly the English seaside.

Walton was previously Professor of Modern Social History at Lancaster University, Professor of Social History at the University of Central Lancashire, and Professor of Social History in the Institute of Northern Studies, Leeds Metropolitan University. He was a Member of the Chetham Society, serving as a Member of Council from 1989 and as General Editor from 1991 to 2004.

== Selected publications ==
- Walton, J. K. (2000), The British seaside: holidays and resorts in the twentieth century, Studies in Popular Culture, Manchester: Manchester University Press, ISBN 978-0719-051-70-8
- Walton, J. K.; Cross, Gary (2005), The playful crowd: pleasure places in the twentieth century, New York: Columbia University Press, ISBN 978-0231-127-24-0
- Walton, J. K. (2007), Riding on rainbows: Blackpool Pleasure Beach and its place in British popular culture, St Albans: Skelter Publishing, ISBN 978-0954-457-36-5
- Walton, J. K.; Hanley, Keith (2010), Constructing cultural tourism: John Ruskin and the tourist gaze, Bristol: Channel View Publications, ISBN 978-1845-411-54-1

Professional and academic associations
Preceded by Creation	Editor of the Chetham Society; 1991–2004	Succeeded by Timothy J. Thornton
