= William Langton (banker) =

British banker and antiquarian (1803–81)

William Langton FSA
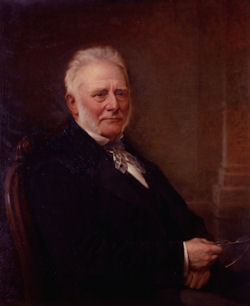
- William Langton
- Born: 17 April 1803; Farfield, Addingham, Yorkshire, England
- Died: 29 September 1881 (aged 78); Ingatestone, Essex, England
- Occupations: Banker; Antiquary
- Spouse: Margaret Hornby
- Children: 9

William Langton FSA (17 April 1803 – 29 September 1881) was an English banker in Manchester, known also for antiquarian and philanthropic interests.

== Life ==
The son of Thomas Langton, a merchant at Riga and Liverpool who died in 1838 in Canada West, he was born at Farfield, near Addingham in the West Riding of Yorkshire, on 17 April 1803; his mother was Ellen, daughter of the Rev. William Currer, vicar of Clapham, and the artist and author Anne Langton was his sister. He was educated mainly abroad, where he acquired familiarity with foreign languages.

From 1821 to 1829 Langton was in business in Liverpool, becoming an agent for some mercantile firms in Russia. Moving to Manchester in August 1829, he accepted a responsible position in Heywood's Bank, where he had a post until 1854. In that year he became managing director of the Manchester & Salford Bank, which then prospered for the next 22 years. He resigned in October 1876 when his sight failed.

He was elected to membership of the Manchester Literary and Philosophical Society on 30 April 1830. Langton was associated with the establishment of some prominent Manchester institutions. He took part in the planning of the Manchester Athenæum in 1836, with Richard Cobden and James Heywood. When the Chetham Society was founded in 1843 he became one of its earliest members; elected its treasurer, he subsequently became secretary. About 1846 he acted as secretary to a committee that was formed to obtain a university for Manchester, an unsuccessful scheme. With James Kay he promoted the Manchester and Salford District Provident Society, set up in 1833, and the Manchester Statistical Society of the same year. The aims of the Manchester and Salford District Provident Society were "for the encouragement of frugality and forethought ...and the occasional relief of sickness and unavoidable misfortune amongst the poor".

When Langton retired, £5,000 was raised in his honour, and a Langton fellowship was founded at Owens College. He spent his retirement at Ingatestone, Essex, where he died on 29 September 1881. He was buried in Fryerning churchyard, Essex.

== Works ==
Langton edited for the Chetham Society three volumes of Chetham Miscellanies 1851, 1856, 1862; Lancashire Inquisitions Post Mortem, 1875; and Thomas Benolt's The Visitation of Lancashire and a Part of Cheshire of 1533, 2 vols. 1876–82.

To the Manchester Statistical Society Langton contributed in 1857 a paper on the Balance of Account between the Mercantile Public and the Bank of England, and in 1867 a presidential address. Among financial papers he wrote On Banks and Bank Shareholders, 1879, and a letter on savings banks, 1880, addressed to the Chancellor of the Exchequer.

== Family ==
Langton married at Kirkham, Lancashire, on 15 November 1831, Margaret, daughter of Joseph Hornby of Ribby Hall, Lancashire. They had three sons and six daughters. Two of the daughters married sons of Benjamin Heywood; another, Katharine Elizabeth, was the second wife of Joseph Gouge Greenwood.

== Notes ==
Attribution

- This article incorporates text from a publication now in the public domain: Lee, Sidney, ed. (1892). "Langton, William". Dictionary of National Biography. Vol. 32. London: Smith, Elder & Co.

Professional and academic associations
Preceded by Shakespeare Phillips	President of the Manchester Statistical Society; 1841–44	Succeeded by Dr John Roberton
Preceded by David Chadwick	President of the Manchester Statistical Society; 1867–69	Succeeded by William Stanley Jevons
Preceded by William Fleming	Secretary of the Chetham Society; 1852–68	Succeeded by Richard Henry Wood
Preceded by Creation	Treasurer of the Chetham Society; 1843–52	Succeeded by Arthur Henry Heywood
