= John Eglington Bailey =

English antiquary (1840–1888)

John Eglington Bailey FSA
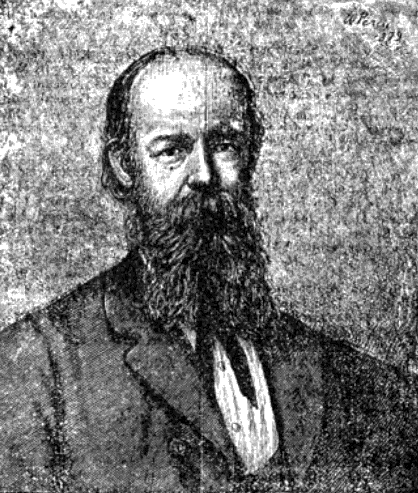
- Born: 13 February 1840; Edgbaston, Birmingham, England
- Died: 23 August 1888 (aged 48); Manchester, Lancashire, England
- Education: Warrington Grammar School; Owens College, Manchester
- Occupation: Antiquary
- Spouse: Emma Mills
- Children: 4

John Eglington Bailey FSA (13 February 1840 – 23 August 1888) was an English antiquary, Secretary of the Chetham Society and Fellow of the Society of Antiquaries.

== Life ==
Born at Edgbaston, Birmingham, on 13 February 1840, he was the son of Charles Bailey, by his wife Mary Elizabeth, daughter of John Eglington of Ashbourne. His parents removed during his childhood to Lancashire. Educated at Warrington Grammar School, he entered in his teens the counting-house of Ralli Brothers in Manchester, and continued there till 1886. He completed his education by attending evening classes at Owens College, Manchester, learned Pitman's shorthand, and contributed articles to short-hand manuscript or lithographed magazines. He interested himself in Thomas Fuller, delivered a lecture on him to the Manchester Phonographic Union, which was printed in Henry Pitman's Popular Lecturer, and devoted his holidays to visiting Fuller's various places of residence.

In 1881, Bailey started a monthly antiquarian magazine, the Palatine Note-Book, which ran for just over four years and ceased with the forty-ninth number in 1885. He was a Member of the Lancashire and Cheshire Antiquarian Society, serving as a Member of Council (1884–8). He was a Member of the Chetham Society, and served as a Member of Council from 1876 and as Secretary from 1882.

Bailey collected works on stenography with a view to writing its history, and built up a valuable library of antiquarian and general literature. In 1886 illness put an end to his studies and projects. He died at Manchester on 23 August 1888, and was buried at Stretford church on 27 August.

== Works ==
In 1874, as the fruit of his researches, Bailey published a life of Thomas Fuller, which gained him admission to the Society of Antiquaries of London, and he was a contributor to the earliest volumes of the Dictionary of National Biography. His collection of Fuller's sermons, completed and edited by W. E. A. Axon, was published in 1891. His other works included:

- Life of a Lancashire Rector during the Civil War, 1877
- The Grammar School of Leigh, 1879
- John Whitaker, 1879
- John Dee and the Steganographia of Trithemius, 1879

He edited reprints of Manchester Al Mondo, 1880; John Dee's Diary, 1880; and John Byrom's Journal, 1882.

Professional and academic associations
Preceded by Richard Henry Wood	Secretary of the Chetham Society; 1882–88	Succeeded by Richard Tonge
