= W. R. Ward =

British historian (23 March 1925 – 2 October 2010)

Professor William Reginald Ward FRHistS FBA
- Born: 23 March 1925; Chesterfield, Derbyshire, England
- Died: 2 October 2010 (aged 85)

Academic background
- Education: Ruskin College, Oxford

Academic work
- Era: Middle Ages
- Discipline: History
- Sub-discipline: Religious History
- Main interests: John Wesley

William Reginald Ward FRHistS FBA (23 March 1925 – 2 October 2010) was a British historian who was President of the Ecclesiastical History Society and Secretary, President and Vice-President of the Chetham Society.

He was born in Chesterfield, Derbyshire to Primitive Methodist parents. He studied at Oxford, where he met his future wife, Barbara. He taught at Ruskin College whilst working on his PhD.

Initially, Ward concentrated his studies on eighteenth century British history but the bulk of his work concerned religious history. He was one of the co-editors on the definitive, scholarly edition of John Wesley's works.

He was a Member of the Chetham Society, serving as a Member of Council (1964-2010), Secretary (1964–84), President (1984–92), and Vice-President (1993-2010). He was a Fellow of the Royal Historical Society and British Academy and also President of the Ecclesiastical History Society (1970–71).

== Works ==
- Georgian Oxford: University Politics in the Eighteenth Century (Clarendon Press, 1958).
- Victorian Oxford (Routledge, 1965).
- Religion & Society in England: 1790-1850 (HarperCollins, 1972).
- The Protestant Evangelical Awakening (Cambridge University Press, 1992).
- Christianity under the Ancien Régime, 1648-1789 (Cambridge University Press, 1999).
- Early Evangelicalism: A Global Intellectual History, 1670-1789 (Cambridge University Press, 2006).

== Notes ==
Professional and academic associations
Preceded by Walter Ullmann	President of the Ecclesiastical History Society; 1970–71	Succeeded by William Hugh Clifford Frend
Preceded by John Smith Roskell	President of the Chetham Society; 1984–92	Succeeded by Paul H. W. Booth
Preceded by George Henry Tupling	Vice-President of the Chetham Society; 1993–2010	Succeeded by Henry D. Rack
Preceded by Rev. John Flitcroft	Secretary of the Chetham Society; 1964–84	Succeeded by Henry D. Rack
