= James Crossley (author) =

British writer

James Crossley FSA
- Born: 31 March 1800; Halifax, Yorkshire, England
- Died: 1 August 1883 (aged 83); Manchester, Lancashire, England
- Occupations: Lawyer; Author; Bibliophile; Literary Scholar

James Crossley FSA (31 March 1800 – 1 August 1883) was an English lawyer, author, bibliophile and literary scholar who was President of the Chetham Society from 1847 to 1883 and President of the Record Society of Lancashire and Cheshire from 1878 to 1883.

== Life ==
James Crossley was born in Halifax on 31 March 1800, and moved to Manchester in 1816. Some of his early essays were published in the Retrospective Review.

He perpetrated a literary fraud, the forging of Fragment on Mummies, supposedly by Sir Thomas Browne, that was a highly successful hoax. The bogus nature of the Fragment, given by Crossley to Simon Wilkin to publish, is now regarded as highly probable, but Crossley never precisely confessed to it.

He set up the Chetham Society in 1843, with Thomas Corser, Francis Robert Raines and others: it was named after Humphrey Chetham and its purpose was to edit and publish historical works relating to Lancashire and Cheshire. In the following years he personally edited many of its publications: including the Autobiographical tracts of John Dee (1851), and the Diary of John Worthington. He served as President from 1847 until 1883. He was Vice-President of the Manchester Literary and Philosophical Society during the late 1850s.

He is said to have collected 100,000 books at his residence in Chorlton on Medlock and later Stocks House, Cheetham, Manchester. He supplied the novelist William Ainsworth with historical material and ideas; he was in business with Ainsworth's father Thomas, and their friendship was lifelong.

Professional and academic associations
Preceded by Edward Holme	President of the Chetham Society; 1847–83	Succeeded by Richard Copley Christie
Preceded by Creation	President of the Record Society of Lancashire and Cheshire; 1878–83	Succeeded by Richard Copley Christie
