= Ernest Broxap =

British historian (1880–1963)

- Born: 1880; Higher Broughton, Salford, England
- Died: 1963 (aged 82–83); Alderley Edge, Cheshire, England
- Education: Owens College, Manchester (MA)

Ernest Broxap (1880–1963) was a British historian, businessman and Secretary of the Chetham Society from 1920 to 1940.

== Life ==
Broxap was born in 1880. His elder brother, Henry Broxap, was the author of A Biography of Thomas Deacon: The Manchester non-juror (Manchester, 1911) and The later non-jurors (Cambridge, 1924).

He studied history at Owens College, Manchester, gaining a BA in 1900 and an MA in 1901, and was taught by the historians T. F. Tout, James Tait, and Charles Firth. After his studies, he joined his elder brother, Henry, as a partner in the family yarn business.

He published a number of seminal works on various aspects of the English Civil War and on Lancashire. Broxap became acquainted with Charles William Sutton and became his Assistant as Secretary of the Chetham Society from 1915 and after Sutton's death, was Secretary for twenty years until 1940.

== Family ==
Broxap married in 1912 and lived at Kersal, Salford, before moving to Hale and Alderley Edge in Cheshire. He died, aged 83, in 1963.

== Select bibliography ==
- "The siege of Manchester in 1642" in Historical Essays by Members of the Owens College, Manchester, published in commemoration of its jubilee (1851–1901), edited by T.F. Tout and James Tait (1902)
- "The sieges of Hull during the Great Civil War", English Historical Review (1905)
- "A Manchester assessment of 1648", in Chetham Miscellanies II, Chetham Society, New Series, 63 (1909)
- The Great Civil War in Lancashire (1642–51), (1st edition, 1910); 2nd edition, Manchester University Press, 1973.
- "Extracts from Manchester churchwardens' accounts, 1664–1710", in Chetham Miscellanies IV, Chetham Society, New Series, 80 (1921)
- "Introduction", in H.G. James, Manchester A Hundred Years Ago (1921).

Professional and academic associations
| Preceded by Charles William Sutton | Secretary of the Chetham Society; 1920–40 | Succeeded by Moses Tyson |
