= Jan Wilkinson =

Academic librarian

Janet Wilkinson (born 12 September 1958) is a British librarian and strategic leader in the higher education and research sectors. She was the University Librarian and Director of the John Rylands University Library of the University of Manchester until 2018. She held the post for 10 years.

Beford this appointment she was Head of Higher Education for the British Library, the UK’s national library, and University Librarian and Keeper of the Brotherton Collection at University of Leeds. Wilkinson was a long-standing board member of the Consortium of University Research Libraries (CURL) - latterly Research Libraries UK (RLUK) and Deputy Librarian at the LSE. Prior to this she held a range of roles within the former polytechnic and college sectors. While at the LSE, Wilkinson gained major philanthropic support for a new library building, designed by Sir Norman Foster. At the University of Manchester she developed the Alan Gilbert Learning Commons, a student-centred, wholly digital, library named after Professor Alan Gilbert, the University’s former President and Vice-Chancellor.

Wilkinson has served on a number of boards within the HE and research sectors and is currently a mentor and consultant in leadership development. She is the Leadership Programme Director for LIBER a pan-European research library member organisation and her work has taken her to Cape Town, Dubai, Denmark, Ireland, North America, Australia, the Netherlands and many UK locations. Wilkinson is widely published in the areas of library leadership, publishing, change management and philanthropic fund-raising. She is also Vice-chair of the Children's University, a Fellow of the Royal Society of Arts, a Fellow of CILIP (Chartered Institute of Information Professionals), and received an honorary doctorate (D.Litt) from the University of Leicester in July 2014 for services to Higher Education,

Wilkinson is a history graduate of the University of Hull (1980), post-graduate in librarianship & information science of the University of North London (1982) and post-graduate in management of the University of East London (1988).
