= John William Robinson Parker =

British Soldier and Antiquary (1857–1938)

Colonel J. W. R. Parker CB JP DL FSA FRHistS
- Born: 6 October 1857
- Died: 24 February 1928 (aged 70)
- Occupations: Soldier; Antiquarian
- Spouse: Beatrice Burn-Murdoch (m. 1896; died 1927)
- Children: 1
- Relatives: Thomas Lister Parker (cousin)
- Military career
- Allegiance: United Kingdom
- Branch: British Army
- Service years: 1876–1902
- Rank: Colonel
- Unit: 5th Lancashire Militia
- Commands: East Lancashire Regiment

John William Robinson Parker CB JP DL FSA FRHistS (6 October 1857 – 24 February 1938) was a British soldier, antiquarian, owner of Browsholme Hall and Honorary Bowbearer of the Forest of Bowland, Lancashire.

== Life ==
Parker was the second son of Thomas Goulbourne Parker (1818–79) of Browsholme and Newton in Yorkshire and Alkincoats and Colne in Lancashire, and his wife Mary Ann Parker (1824–88) the eldest daughter and co-heiress of John Francis Carr (1786–1862) of Carr Lodge, Horbury, Yorkshire. He was a cousin of the antiquarian Thomas Lister Parker.

Parker's succeeded his elder brother, Edward Parker (1846–94), as owner of Browsholme Hall and Honorary Bowbearer of the Forest of Bowland, Lancashire, in 1894. Parker joined the 5th Lancashire Militia in 1876. He was later supreme commander of the 800 men of the 3rd Battalion of the East Lancashire Regiment serving in the Second Boer War in South Africa. He was also considered as a potential Conservative Parliamentary candidate in the 1902 Clitheroe by-election. He was appointed a Companion of the Order of the Bath (CB), served as a Justice of the Peace and was also Deputy Lieutenant of Lancashire and High Sheriff of Yorkshire (1913–14).

Parker was elected a Fellow of the Society of Antiquaries and Royal Historical Society and was involved in various societies. He was President of the Harleian Society, Yorkshire Archaeological Society, and Yorkshire Parish Register Society. In Lancashire, he was Member of Council (from 1916) and President (1925–38) of the Chetham Society, President (1928–33) and vice-president (1933–37) of the Lancashire and Cheshire Antiquarian Society, Member of Council (from 1893) and vice-president of the Record Society of Lancashire and Cheshire, and Member of Council (from 1899) and President of the Lancashire Parish Register Society (1920–38). He published several volumes of medieval records. Parker died on 24 February 1938.

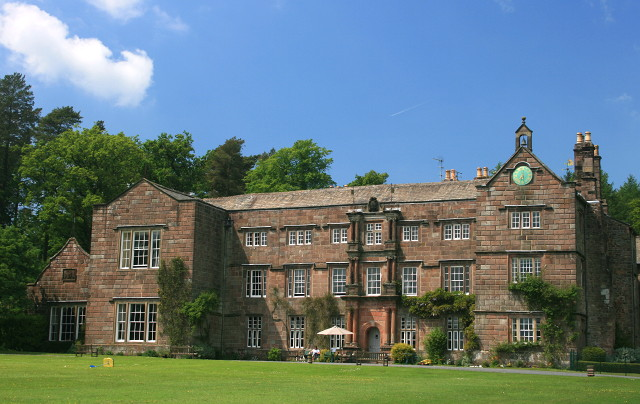
Browsholme Hall.

== Family ==
On 11 April 1896, Parker married his first cousin, Gertrude Marion Beatrice Burn-Murdoch (1865–1927), a daughter of Reverend Canon James McGibbon Burn-Murdoch and Maria Hannah Carr (a descendant of John Carr (1723–1807)). Beatrice Parker died on 12 September 1927. Their only son was Robert Goulbourne Parker (1900–75).

== Select bibliography ==
- A Calendar of the Lancashire Assize Rolls, Record Society of Lancashire and Cheshire, 47 (1904), 49 (1905)
- The Parish Register of Thirsk in the County of York, North Riding, 1556–1721, Yorkshire Parish Register Society, 42 (1911)
- Feet of Fines for the County of York, 1218–31, Yorkshire Archaeological Aociety, 62 (1921)
- Plea Rolls of the County Palatine of Lancaster: Roll I, Chetham Society, New Series, 87 (1928)
- Lancashire Deeds, Volume I: Shuttleworth Deeds, Part 1, Chetham Society, New Series, 91 (1934)
- The Registers of the Parish Church of Whalley in the County of Lancaster, 1605–53, Lancashire Parish Register Society, 74 (1936)

Honorary titles
Preceded by Charles Thellusson	High Sheriff of Yorkshire; 1913–14	Succeeded by Charles Ernest Charlesworth
Preceded by Edward Parker	Bowbearer of the Forest of Bowland; 1894–1938	Succeeded by Robert Goulbourne Parker
Professional and academic associations
Preceded by James Tait	President of the Chetham Society; 1925–38	Succeeded by Ernest Fraser Jacob
Preceded by Walter Butterworth	President of the Lancashire and Cheshire Antiquarian Society; 1928–33	Succeeded by John Wilfrid Jackson
Preceded by Henry Fishwick	President of the Lancashire Parish Register Society; 1920–38	Succeeded by Ernest Fraser Jacob
