= Richard Henry Wood =

British Antiquary and Philanthropist (1820–1908)

Richard Henry Wood DL JP FSA FRGS
- Born: 1820; Manchester, Lancashire, England
- Died: 1908 (aged 87–88); Daresbury, Cheshire, England
- Occupation: Antiquary
- Spouse: Elizabeth Hatton

Richard Henry Wood DL JP FSA FRGS (6 February 1820 – 26 April 1908) was a British antiquary and philanthropist.

== Career ==
Wood was the son of Charles Wood (d.1866) of Northen House, Northen, Cheshire, a former officer in the Napoleonic Wars, and later solicitor in Brazenose Street, Manchester, and his wife Catherine (née Rose). In his youth, he was an amateur jockey and hunting sportsman. However, he was for a while a stockbroker before he married and entered business with his brother-in-law as an iron merchant.

His interests in literature, arts and antiquarian matters led to his involvement in several learned societies. He was a member of the Archaeological Institute, Cambrian Archaeological Association, Devonshire Association from 1898, the Lancashire and Cheshire Antiquarian Society, Index Society, Pipe-Roll Society, Camden Society, Cheshire Antiquarian Society, Warwickshire Field Club, the archaeological societies of Lincolnshire, Northamptonshire, Leicestershire, Shropshire, Yorkshire and Warwickshire, and also a Member of the Club of the Royal Society, the Unionist Club of Manchester, and the Rugby, Sidmouth and Warrington Clubs.

Wood was a Member of the Chetham Society and was elected as its Secretary in 1868, serving as such until 1882. Through his Chetham Society connections, he was a close friend of the novelist William Harrison Ainsworth, who dedicated his novel Beau Nash to Wood. He was elected President of the Cambrian Archaeological Association in 1903.

Wood served as a magistrate and as Deputy Lieutenant for both Warwickshire and Merionethshire as well as a Commissioner of Income Tax for Warwickshire from 1882. He was also High Sheriff of Merionethshire in 1889, during which term he had the honour of receiving Queen Victoria and Princess Beatrice. He lived at Penrhos (or Penrose) House, Little Church Street, Rugby from 1874 to 1884, then at Pantglas, Trawsfynydd, until the mid-1890s when he moved to Belmont, Sidmouth for his remaining years. He was also Lord of the Manor of Rivers Hall, Essex.

== Collections and philanthropy ==
In terms of Wood's private collections, he presented to the nation his collection of chain mail, and also owned a library of various rare editions, pictures and numerous charters relating to Cheshire. Some of his pictures were later donated to Manchester Art Gallery.

Many organisations benefited from his generosity, including several hospitals and churches in England and Wales, as well as the town of Sidmouth. Amongst other benefactions, he gave the Church House and almshouses to the parish of Trawsfynydd, restored the Church of Long Stanton, Cambridgeshire, helped the Rugby Primitive Methodists, contributed to the work in New Bilton (where he was patron of the living), and was a regular subscriber to St Oswald's Schools, donated a memorial window to the Parish Church of St Nicholas, Sidmouth.

Wood and his wife, Elizabeth, were particularly involved, in Rugby, Warwickshire, as benefactors and founders of the Hospital of St Cross, Rugby in 1882, Rugby Public Library in 1890, and the town's meeting rooms, the Wood Institute. Wood was a Member of the hospital's Board of Management and was later elected president in 1884.

As a memorial to his late wife, he donated £1,000 to the Royal Devon and Exeter Hospital. It was on his trip to Exeter to present this gift that he fell ill. He died on 26 April 1908 and was buried at Daresbury on 1 May 1908.

== Honours ==
Wood was elected a Fellow of the Royal Geographical Society, Fellow of the Society of Antiquaries (1865) and as a Corresponding Member of the Société des Antiquaires de Normandie.

== Family ==
Wood married Elizabeth Hatton, daughter of Peter Hatton of Belle Vue, Hartford, Cheshire, who died on 14 July 1904.

Honorary titles
Preceded by Griffith Williams	Sheriff of Merionethshire; 1889–90	Succeeded by Charles Edward Jones Owen
Professional and academic associations
Preceded by Joseph Bailey, 2nd Baron Glanusk	President of the Cambrian Archaeological Association; 1903–04	Succeeded by John William Willis-Bund
Preceded by William Langton	Secretary of the Chetham Society; 1868–82	Succeeded by John Eglington Bailey
