= Chetham Society =

British text publication society established in 1843

- Formation: 23 March 1843; 183 years ago
- Type: Historical society
- Registration no.: 700047
- Legal status: Charity
- Purpose: Historical study; research
- Headquarters: Manchester, England
- Location: Chetham's Library
- Region served: Lancashire; Cheshire; Greater Manchester
- President: Paul Fouracre
- Website: www.chethamsociety.org.uk

The Chetham Society "for the publication of remains historic and literary connected with the Palatine Counties of Lancaster and Chester" is a text publication society and registered charity (No. 700047) established on 23 March 1843.

== History ==
The Chetham Society is the oldest historical society in North West England. It was founded by a group of gentlemen (including the lawyer James Crossley and the clergymen Thomas Corser, Richard Parkinson, and Francis Robert Raines), who wished to promote interest in the counties' historical sources. The society held its foundation meeting on 23 March 1843 at Chetham's Library, in Manchester, which was established in 1653 by the will of the philanthropist Humphrey Chetham. The society became a registered charity (No. 700047) in 1988.

The Chetham Society was amongst the earliest antiquarian and historical societies to be established in Britain during the nineteenth century, and appears to have been modelled, in part, on the Durham-based Surtees Society founded in 1834.

During its early years, the society enjoyed the support of patrons such as the Prime Minister of the day Sir Robert Peel, the Bishop of Chester, the Earls of Balcarres, Burlington, and Derby, Lord Stanley of Bickerstaffe, Lord Francis Egerton, as well as several other peers and MPs who became members.

Many distinguished historians and scholars have been involved in the life of the society, including John Eglington Bailey, C. R. Cheney, John Parsons Earwaker, Edward Hawkins, Sir Henry Hoyle Howorth, George Ormerod, Sir Frederick Maurice Powicke, William Stubbs, Thomas Frederick Tout, J. M. Wallace-Hadrill, and Joseph Brooks Yates, amongst many others.

== Membership ==
Membership of the Chetham Society is open to all individuals and institutions interested in the various historical and literary aspects of Lancashire and Cheshire.

== Publications ==
Since 1843, the society has published nearly 280 volumes in three series, supplying a regular output of valuable works of scholarship relating to the study of the history of North-West England.

Old Series (1843–93)

The Old Series (O.S.) ran from 1843 until 1893 (totalling 116 volumes). Publications included Pott's Discovery of Witches, Civil War Tracts, and various diaries, journals, autobiographies, correspondence, heralds' visitations, family deeds, papers, letters, and accounts, school registers and records, wills, and ecclesiastical and parish histories.

New Series (1883–1947)

The New Series (N.S.) commenced in 1883 and ended in 1947 (totalling 110 volumes). Publications covered a diversity of areas and topics, including charters, cartularies, rolls, rentals, surveys, autobiographical writings, biographies, genealogies, and various parish, town, and local histories.

Third Series (1948–present)

The Third Series (T.S.) began in 1948 (volume 53 was published in 2019). In recent years (particularly since the inauguration of the Third Series), the society's focus has tended to move away from its traditional role of publishing original primary texts towards publishing scholarly secondary analyses. Recent volumes have included:

- Guscott, S. J. (2003), Humphrey Chetham, 1580–1653: Fortune, Politics, and Mercantile Culture in Seventeenth-Century England, Chetham Society, T.S., vol. 45, ISBN 1-85825-191-5
- Lynch, M. E., ed. (2006), Life, Love, and Death in North-East Lancashire, 1510–37: A Translation of the Act Book of the Ecclesiastical Court of Whalley, Chetham Society, T.S., vol. 46, ISBN 978-0-9554276-0-2
- Wilson, J. F., ed. (2009), King Cotton: A Tribute to Douglas A. Farnie, Chetham Society, T.S., vol. 47, ISBN 978-1-905472-09-3
- Gratton, J. M. (2010), The Parliamentarian and Royalist War Effort in Lancashire, 1642–51, Chetham Society, T.S., vol. 48, ISBN 978-0-9554276-1-9
- Virgoe, J. M. (2012), Thomas Eccleston (1752–1809): A Progressive Lancastrian Agriculturalist, Chetham Society, T.S., vol. 49, ISBN 978-0-9554276-2-6
- Collins, S. F. (2012). James Crossley: A Manchester Man of Letters. Chetham Society, T.S. Vol. 50. ISBN 978-0-9554276-3-3.
- Hodgkins, D., ed. (2013), The Diary of Edward Watkin, Chetham Society, T.S., vol. 51, ISBN 978-0-9554276-4-0
- Holt, J. S. (2017), The Hornby Castle Estates: Agrarian Change from the 1582 Survey to the 1751 Sederunt, Chetham Society, T.S., vol. 52, ISBN 978-0-9554276-5-7
- Hill, P.; Booth, P. H. W., eds. (2019). Chester County Court Indictment Roll 1354–1377: Dealing with Serious Crime in Later Fourteenth-Century Cheshire. Chetham Society, T.S. Vol. 53. ISBN 978-0-9554276-6-4.

== Officers ==
=== Presidents ===
- 1843–47 Edward Holme
- 1847–83 James Crossley
- 1884–1901 Richard Copley Christie
- 1901–15 Sir Adolphus William Ward
- 1915–25 James Tait
- 1925–38 John William Robinson Parker
- 1938–71 Ernest Fraser Jacob
- 1972–84 J. S. Roskell
- 1984–92 William Reginald Ward
- 1992–2005 Paul Booth
- 2005–present Paul Fouracre

=== Vice-presidents ===
- 1843–58 Richard Parkinson
- 1858–78 Francis Robert Raines
- 1879–82 William Beamont
- 1882–84 Richard Copley Christie
- 1884–1901 William Stubbs
- 1901–14 Henry Fishwick
- 1915–24 William Ecroyd Farrer
- 1925–37 George William Daniels
- 1938–62 George Henry Tupling
- 1993–2010 William Reginald Ward
- 2011–present Henry D. Rack

=== General editors ===
- 1991–94 John H. G. Archer
- 1991–2004 John K. Walton
- 1991–2005 Paul Booth
- 2003–present Timothy J. Thornton

=== Secretaries ===
- 1843–52 William Fleming
- 1852–68 William Langton
- 1868–82 Richard Henry Wood
- 1882–88 John Eglington Bailey
- 1888–90 Richard Tonge
- 1890–1920 Charles William Sutton
- 1920–40 Ernest Broxap
- 1940–51 Moses Tyson
- 1951–64 John Flitcroft
- 1964–84 William Reginald Ward
- 1984–94 Henry D. Rack
- 1994–2008 Alan G. Crosby
- 2008–13 Christopher L. Hunwick
- 2013–17 Robert E. Stansfield-Cudworth
- 2017–present Simon J. Harris

=== Treasurers ===
- 1843–52 William Langton
- 1852–79 Arthur Henry Heywood
- 1879–1915 John Joseph Jordan
- 1915–20 William Lees
- 1920–26 John Moodie
- 1927–33 Thomas William Sowerbutts
- 1934–60 John Humphreys King
- 1960–68 Harold Lupton Howard
- 1968–70 Sidney Proctor
- 1970–72 Alan Siddall
- 1972–83 Owen Ashmore
- 1983–84 William Henry Chaloner
- 1984–89 Gordon Bradley Hindle
- 1989–94 John Leslie Ogilvie Holden
- 1994–2001 Ernest Edwin Mullineux
- 2001–present Dorothy J. Laver

== See also ==
- Chetham's Library
- Historic Society of Lancashire and Cheshire
- Record Society of Lancashire and Cheshire
- Lancashire and Cheshire Antiquarian Society
- Lancashire Parish Register Society
- List of societies for education in Manchester
