= John Flitcroft =

British clergyman (1914–1994)

The Reverend John Flitcroft
- Born: 1914
- Died: 1994 (aged 79–80)
- Education: University of Manchester (MA)
- Occupations: Clergyman, Academic

Ecclesiastical career
- Religion: Christianity (Anglican)
- Church: Church of England
- Ordained: 1938 (deacon); 1939 (priest)
- Offices held: Honorary Curate of St Ann’s Church, Manchester (1954); Vicar of Lytham (1966–79)

The Reverend John Flitcroft (1914–1994) was a British cleric, academic and historian.

== Career ==
Flitcroft was educated at the University of Manchester, studying for his Bachelor of Arts (BA) and Master of Arts (MA) degrees in 1936 and 1937 respectively. He then studied at Bishops' College, Cheshunt before being ordained as a deacon in 1938 and later ordained as a priest in 1939. He was appointed to numerous livings during the war years and afterwards, before being appointed as lecturer in theology at the University of Manchester in 1954, which post he held until 1966. At the university he was also Warden of Hulme Hall, a Church of England hall of residence, from 1950 to 1964. During this time, he was also an active Member of the Chetham Society, serving as Council Member from 1945 until 1971, and as Secretary from 1951 to 1964. He was appointed as an Honorary Curate of St Ann's Church, Manchester in 1954 and was later the Vicar of St Cuthbert's Church, Lytham from 1966 to 1979. He retired to Renfrewshire in 1979. He died in 1994.

Professional and academic associations
Preceded by Dr Moses Tyson	Secretary of the Chetham Society; 1951–64	Succeeded by William Reginald Ward
