= Record Society of Lancashire and Cheshire =

Local history society in England

- Formation: 1878; 148 years ago
- Type: Text Publication Society
- Registration no.: 500434
- Legal status: Charity
- Purpose: Historical Study; Research
- Headquarters: Liverpool, United Kingdom
- Region served: Lancashire; Cheshire; Greater Manchester
- Official language: English
- Activities: Research; Publications
- Collections: Archives
- 13th President: Dr Martin R. V. Heale
- Website: www.rslc.org.uk

The Record Society of Lancashire and Cheshire is a text publication society that publishes historical documents relating to the traditional counties of Lancashire and Cheshire. It became a registered charity (No. 500434) for public education in the history of the two counties in 1970.

== History ==
The society was founded in 1878, when one of the region's foremost historians, John Parsons Earwaker, suggested to his colleagues in the Chetham Society that they should form another organisation to foster their common interest in local history. Earwaker served as the society's founding Secretary (until his death in 1895) although, towards the end of his life, his other commitments led to delays in the society's planned publications.

The bibliophile James Crossley, President of the Chetham Society, was the founding President, and another prominent early member (and later vice-president) was William Ecroyd Farrer.

== Publications ==
Publication started with Lancashire and Cheshire Church Surveys 1649–1655, edited by Henry Fishwick (1879). Earwaker soon gained permission to publish lists of wills that had been proved in Chester, which was "hailed as a coup"; G. E. Cokayne, Lancaster Herald, wrote to congratulate Earwaker, stating that "I do not think there is any work that has been at any time, or that could be now, more useful." The index ran to seven volumes (covering 1545–1760); according to Earwaker's obituary, "their value to students of local history is incalculable".

Other important documents that have been published by the society include part of De laude Cestrie, edited by Margerie Venables Taylor, one of the earliest examples of prose writing concerning an English urban centre. Many of the early volumes have been digitised by the Internet Archive. The society has published more than 150 volumes (2019), an up-to-date list of which is maintained by the Royal Historical Society. The most recent volumes are The Diaries of William Lloyd Holden, 1829 and 1830, edited by Jonathan Pepler (2019), The Cheshire Motor Vehicle Registrations, edited by Craig Horner (2019) and The First Minute Book of the Liverpool Athenaeum, 1797-1809, edited by David Brazendale and Mark Towsey (2020).

When the society published a volume of early Cheshire charters (1958) in honour of its long-serving President, William Fergusson Irvine, a local newspaper described the book as "beautifully printed and illustrated...well worthy of the distinguished scholar in whose honour it had been produced".

Recent reviews of the society's volumes have described them as "invaluable for anyone interested in the history of this area", and pointed out that they are "well edited" and the documents "thoroughly explained". One review (2013) observed that by bringing to public attention documents that are an "under used resource", the society's publications could allow "insights into parish and community life rarely available in other sources".

== Membership ==
Membership is open to all individuals and societies who are interested in the various historical aspects of the two counties Palatine.

== Officers ==
=== Presidents ===
- 1878–83 James Crossley
- 1883–95 Prof. Richard Copley Christie
- 1895–1904 Lt-Col. Henry Fishwick
- 1904–9 Sir George John Armytage, Bt
- 1909–23 John Paul Rylands
- 1923–62 William Fergusson Irvine
- 1962–7 Prof. Christopher N. L. Brooke
- 1967–80 Prof. Alec Reginald Myers
- 1981–98 Prof. Alan Harding
- 1998–2003 Dr Jennifer I. Kermode
- 2003–13 Jonathan R. H. Pepler
- 2013–18 Dr Colin Bonham Phillips
- 2018–present Dr Martin R. V. Heale

=== Vice-Presidents ===
- 1878–80 William Beamont
- 1878–80 George Little
- 1878–83 Prof. Richard Copley Christie
- 1878–93 James Croston
- 1878–95 Lt-Col. Henry Fishwick
- 1883–92 His Hon. Sir Henry Fox Bristowe
- 1883–95 George Thomas Orlando Bridgeman
- 1892–5 Sir Henry Hoyle Howorth
- 1895–1911 George Edward Cokayne
- 1903–4 Sir George John Armytage, Bt
- 1903–9 John Paul Rylands
- 1904–14 Lt-Col. Henry Fishwick
- 1909–16 Sir George John Armytage, Bt
- 1917–21 William Ecroyd Farrer
- 1919–23 William Fergusson Irvine
- 1927–38 Col. John William Robinson Parker
- 2014 Dr Peter McNiven
- 2015–present Geoffrey P. Higgins
- 2018–19 Dr Colin Bonham Phillips
- 2018–present Brian W. Quintrell

=== Secretaries ===
- 1878–94 John Parsons Earwaker
- 1894–1909 William Fergusson Irvine
- 1909–22 Ronald Stewart-Brown
- 1922–33 Robert Gladstone Jnr
- 1933–45 John Henry Elliot Bennett
- 1945–65 Reginald Sharpe France
- 1965–84 Brian Collins Redwood
- 1985–7 Prof. Anthony P. Jenkins
- 1987–present Dr Dorothy J. Clayton

=== Treasurers ===
- 1878–1909 John Paul Rylands
- 1909–21 Frank Charles Beazley
- 1927–36 William Assheton Tonge
- 1936–66 P. H. Lawson
- 1966–2000 Brian W. Quintrell
- 2000–17 Dr Fiona Pogson
- 2017–present Jonathan R. H. Pepler

=== Editors ===
- 1977–84 Dr Jennifer I. Kermode
- 1985–95 Dr Peter McNiven
- 1995–2002 Dr Philip J. Morgan
- 2002–13 Dr Peter McNiven
- 2013–17 Dr Martin R. V. Heale
- 2017–present Dr Fiona Pogson

== See also ==
- Chetham Society
- Historic Society of Lancashire and Cheshire
- Lancashire and Cheshire Antiquarian Society
- Lancashire Parish Register Society
