= Re Exchange Banking Co =

Flitcroft’s Case
- Court: Court of Appeal
- Full case name: In re Exchange Banking Company
- Citation: (1882) LR 21 Ch D 519

Case opinions
- Lord Jessel MR

Keywords
- Dividends

In re Exchange Banking Company or Flitcroft's case (1882) LR 21 Ch D 519 is a UK company law case concerning the payment of dividends. It was decided when the law required that dividends should only be paid out of a company's profits, although the courts deferred to company directors to define their own rules for determining when that was so.

== Facts ==
The directors of the Exchange Banking Company had presented account reports before shareholder meetings, which were untrue. Between 1873 and 1878 they paid half yearly dividends totalling £3,192, when they knew items in the accounts were bad debts, irrecoverable and consequently there were no distributable profits. The shareholders acted on the reports and declared dividends. The liquidator issued a summons against five former directors, Flitcroft, Simpson, Grundy, Bardsley and Ramwell, alleging joint and several, or partial, liability, depending on the periods when they had been in office.

== Judgment ==
=== High Court ===
James Bacon VC found that the directors were liable to repay the unlawful dividends.

I should say they are trustees and nothing else. They have interests of their own, but they are trustees of the money which may be collected by subscriptions, and of all the property that may be acquired; they have the direction and management of that property, and at the same time they have incurred direct obligation to the persons who have so entrusted them with their money.

=== Court of Appeal ===
Lord Jessel MR agreed the directors must repay the money. Capital invested by shareholders (at this time the aggregate of the nominal share value, not including share premiums, as legal capital is defined under Companies Act 2006) could not be returned to them, and dividends should be paid out of profits only. He said the following.

It follows then that if directors who are quasi trustees for the company improperly pay away the assets to shareholders, they are liable to replace them. It is no answer to say that the shareholders could not compel them to do so. I am of the opinion that the company could in its corporate capacity compel them to do so, even if there were no winding up… directors in each case are to be declared jointly and severally liable and not only jointly liable.... The creditor has no debtor but that impalpable thing the corporation, which has no property except the assets of the business. [He...] gives credit to the company on the faith of the representation that the capital shall be applied only for the purposes of the business, and he has therefore a right to say that the corporation shall keep its capital and not return it to the shareholders, though it may be a right which he cannot enforce otherwise than by a winding-up order. It follows then that if directors who are quasi trustees for the company improperly pay away the assets to the shareholders, they are liable to replace them…

== See also ==
- UK company law
