= Charles Leigh (librarian) =

English academic librarian (1871–1940)

Charles William Edward Leigh (13 April 1871 – 9 December 1940) was an English academic librarian.

Leigh was born in Chelsea, London, the son of Story Leigh and Adeline Dobson. His father was a footman in the household of Col. Francis Burton (son of Admiral Ryder Burton) and later worked as an attendant at the British Museum and later the Natural History Museum. From 1895 to 1903, Leigh was successively on the staff of the Natural History Museum and librarian of the Manchester Literary and Philosophical Society being elected to membership on 17 November 1903. In 1903 he was appointed librarian of the Library of Manchester University and held the post until his retirement in 1935. He edited two important catalogues of collections in the Library and established new administrative methods to replace the cumbersome systems used in the 19th century. The Dewey Decimal Classification was introduced by him together with higher standards in cataloguing based on those of the British Museum library.

== Publications ==
- 1915: Catalogue of the Christie Collection. Manchester: University Press
- 1929: "The Christie Library" in: The Book of Manchester and Salford; for the British Medical Association. Manchester: George Falkner & Sons, 1929; pp. 73–75
- 1932: Catalogue of the Library for Deaf Education. Manchester: University Press
