= John Paul Rylands =

British antiquarian (1846–1923)

John Paul Rylands FSA
- Born: 1846
- Died: 22 March 1923; Birkenhead, Liverpool
- Education: Middle Temple
- Occupations: Barrister; Genealogist; Topographer
- Spouse: Mary Isabel (c.1862-1946)

John Paul Rylands, FSA (1846 – 22 March 1923, Birkenhead), was an English barrister, genealogist and topographer.

John Paul Rylands was the son of Thomas G. Rylands of Highfields, Thelwall in Cheshire who died in 1900. He was admitted to the Bar from the Middle Temple. He married Mary Isabel (c. 1862–1946), who bore him two sons in the 1880s. He died on 22 March 1923 at Birkenhead.

== Works ==
- (ed.) The visitation of Cheshire in the year 1580, by Robert Glover, 1882
- (ed.) Cheshire and Lancashire funeral certificates, A.D. 1600 to 1678, 1882
- (ed.) The visitation of the county of Dorset, taken in the year 1623, by Henry Saint-George, 1885
- (ed. with George Grazebrook) The Visitation of Shropshire Taken in the Year 1623 by Robert Tresswell, 1889
- Notes on book-plates (ex libris) : with special reference to Lancashire and Cheshire examples, and a proposed nomenclature for the shapes of shields, 1889
- (ed.) Lancashire and Cheshire wills and inventories, 1563 to 1807, now preserved at Chester, 1897
- (ed.) Pedigrees made at the visitation of Cheshire, 1613 : taken by Richard St.-George esq., Norroy king of arms and Henry St.-George, gent., Bluemantle pursuivant of arms; and some other contemporary pedigrees, 1909

Professional and academic associations
| Preceded by Sir George John Armytage, Bt | President of the Record Society of Lancashire and Cheshire; 1909–23 | Succeeded by William Fergusson Irvine |
| Preceded by Sir George John Armytage, Bt | Vice-President of the Record Society of Lancashire and Cheshire; 1903–09 | Succeeded by Sir George John Armytage, Bt |
