= Richard Copley Christie =

British philanthropist (1830–1901)

The Worshipful Professor Richard Copley Christie
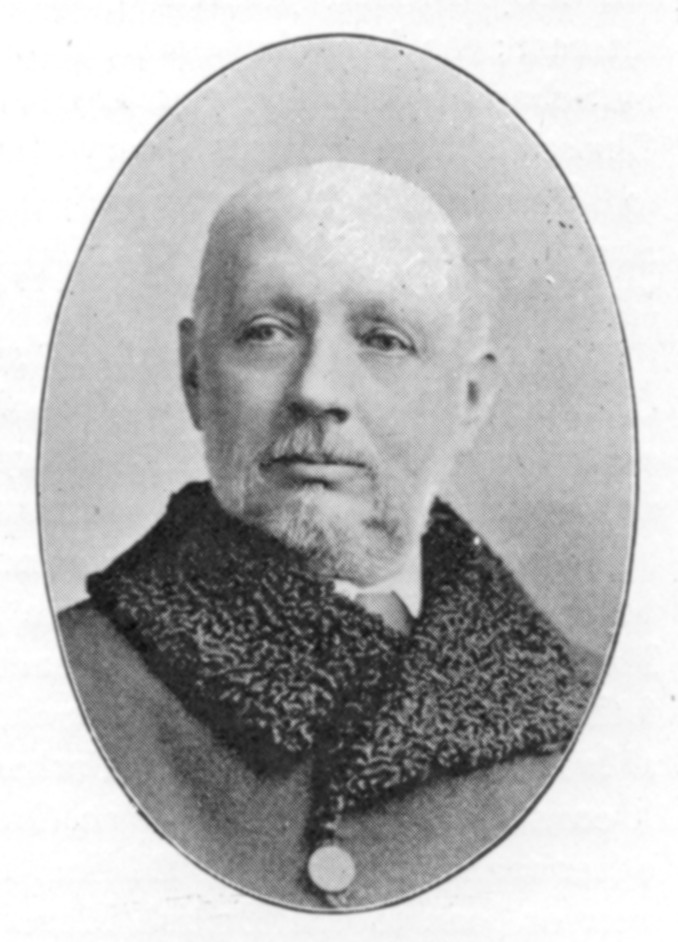
- A photograph of Christie in an 1885 book
- Born: 22 July 1830; Lenton, Nottinghamshire, England
- Died: 9 January 1901 (aged 70); Surrey, England
- Occupations: Lawyer; Philanthropist; Bibliophile

Academic background
- Education: Lincoln College, Oxford; Lincoln's Inn

Richard Copley Christie (22 July 1830 – 9 January 1901) was an English lawyer, university teacher, philanthropist and bibliophile.

== Early life and education ==
He was born at Lenton in Nottinghamshire, the son of a mill owner. He was educated at Lincoln College, Oxford where he was tutored by Mark Pattison, and was called to the bar at Lincoln's Inn in 1857. He also held numerous academic appointments, notably the professorships of history from 1854 (the same year he was elected to the membership of Manchester Literary and Philosophical Society) to 1856 and of political economy from 1855 to 1866 at Owens College.

== Philanthropy ==
Christie was a friend of the industrialist Sir Joseph Whitworth. By Whitworth's will, Christie was appointed one of three legatees, each of whom was left more than half a million pounds for their own use, ‘they being each of them aware of the objects’ to which these funds would have been put by Whitworth. They chose to spend more than a fifth of the money on support for Owens College, together with the purchase of land now occupied by the Manchester Royal Infirmary. In 1897, Christie personally assigned more than £50,000 for the erection of the Whitworth Hall, to complete the front quadrangle of Owens College.

He was president of the Whitworth Institute from 1890 to 1895 and was much interested in the medical and other charities of Manchester, especially the Cancer Pavilion and Home, of whose committee he was chairman from 1890 to 1893, and which later became the Christie Hospital. In October 1893 the freedom of the city of Manchester was conferred upon him and on his surviving fellow legatee, R. D. Darbishire.

=== Chancellor of the diocese ===
From 1872 to 1894, Christie was Chancellor of the Anglican Diocese of Manchester. In that capacity, he advised Bishop of Manchester James Fraser on the matters that led to the imprisonment of the Rev. Sidney Faithorn Green under the Public Worship Regulation Act 1874.

=== Bibliophily ===
Christie was a book collector and bequeathed his library of approximately 15,000 volumes to Owens College. The collection included an extensive set of works printed by Étienne Dolet, publications from the Aldine Press, and of volumes printed by Sebastian Gryphius and other European humanists. His Étienne Dolet, the Martyr of the Renaissance (1880) is regarded as a comprehensive study of the subject.

== Death ==
Christie died at Ribsden in Surrey after a long period of illness: the book collection has always been separate from the general stock of the library of Manchester University and was transferred to the John Rylands Library building in Deansgate in 1972. A printed catalogue was issued in 1915 by the librarian, Charles Leigh. A stained glass window commemorates him on the staircase of the Christie Library.

== Scholarship ==
He was the author of a number of essays and contributions to periodicals, some of which were published after his death. He was a Member of the Chetham Society, serving as a Member of Council from 1868, as vice-president in 1882–3, and as president from 1884 until 1901.

== Sources ==
- Manchester book collectors, by Brenda J. Scragg
- Rigg, J. Anthony (1968) "A comparative history of the libraries of Manchester and Liverpool Universities up to 1903", in: Saunders, W. L., ed. University and Research Library Studies: some contributions from the University of Sheffield Post-graduate School of Librarianship and Information Science. Oxford: Pergamon Press, 1968
- Charles Leigh, "Catalogue of the Christie Collection : Comprising the Printed Books and Manuscripts Bequeathed to the Library of the University of Manchester by the Late Richard Copley Christie, LL. D.", Manchester: University Press, 1915, available at Archive.org

Professional and academic associations
Preceded by Henry Edward Schunck	Secretary of the Manchester Literary and Philosophical Society; 1857–60	Succeeded by Sir Henry Enfield Roscoe
Preceded by James Crossley	President of the Chetham Society; 1884–1901	Succeeded by Adolphus William Ward
Preceded by William Beamont	Vice-President of the Chetham Society; 1882–84	Succeeded by William Stubbs
Preceded by James Crossley	President of the Record Society of Lancashire and Cheshire; 1883–95	Succeeded by Henry Fishwick
Preceded by George Little	Vice-President of the Record Society of Lancashire and Cheshire; 1878–83	Succeeded by James Croston
