= William Stubbs =

British historian and Anglican bishop (1825–1901)

The Right Reverend William Stubbs HonFRSE
- Bishop of Oxford
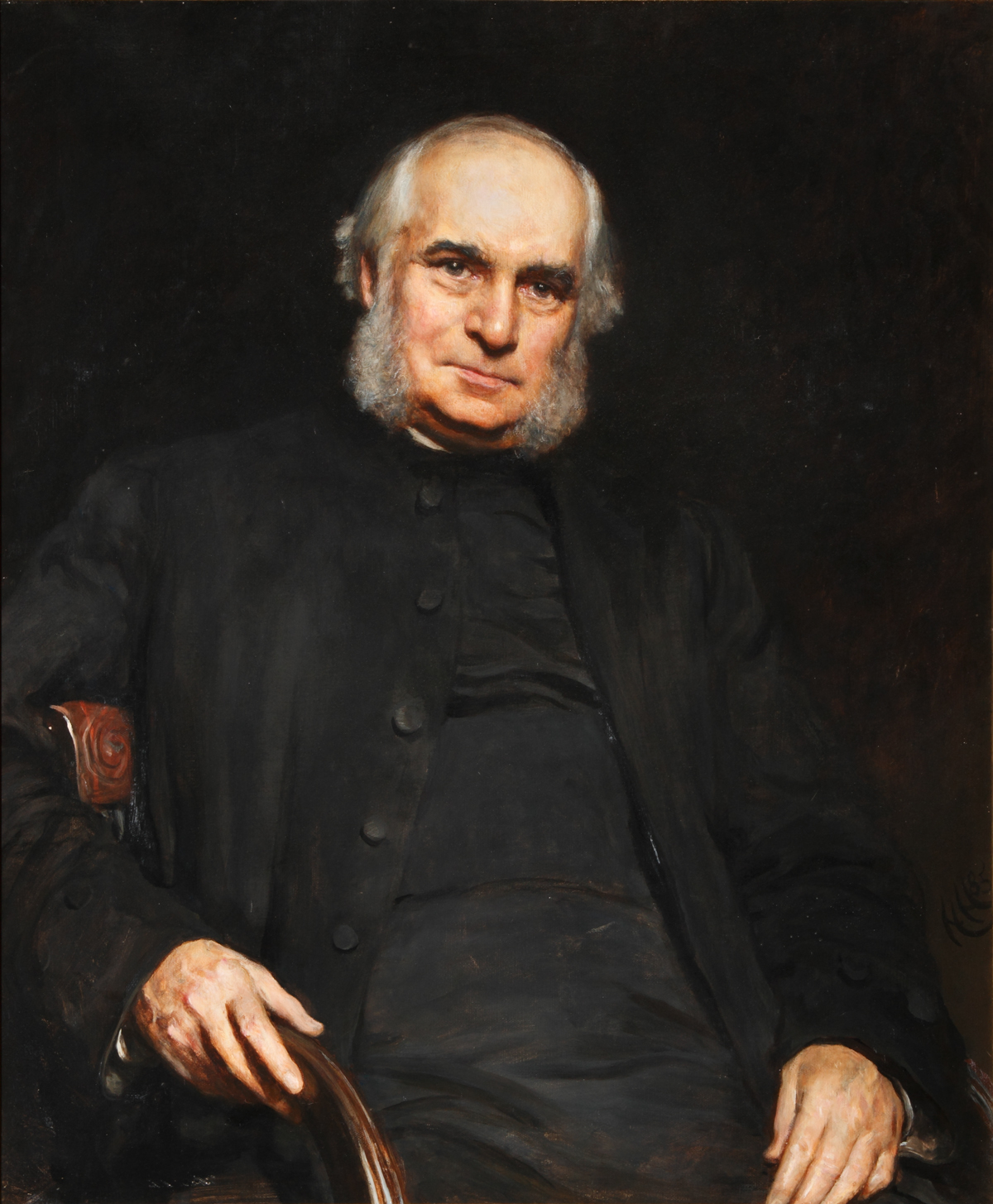
- Portrait by Hubert von Herkomer, 1885
- Diocese: Oxford
- In office: 1889 to 1901
- Predecessor: John Mackarness
- Successor: Francis Paget
- Other posts: Regius Professor of Modern History (1866–1884); Bishop of Chester (1884–1889)

Orders
- Consecration: 25 April 1884

Personal details
- Born: 21 June 1825 Knaresborough, Yorkshire, England
- Died: 22 April 1901 (aged 75) Cuddesdon, Oxfordshire, England
- Buried: All Saints, Cuddesdon, Oxfordshire
- Denomination: Anglican
- Spouse: Catherine Dellar
- Education: Ripon Grammar School
- Alma mater: Christ Church, Oxford

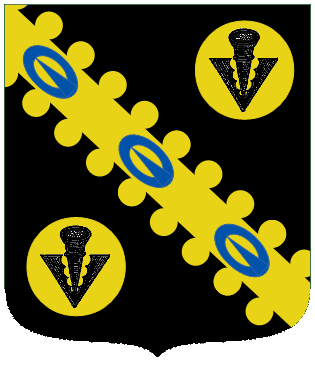
Arms: Sable on a bend nebuly Or between two bezants each charged with a pheon also Sable three buckles Proper.

William Stubbs HonFRSE (21 June 1825 – 22 April 1901) was an English historian and Anglican bishop. He was Regius Professor of Modern History at the University of Oxford between 1866 and 1884. He was Bishop of Chester from 1884 to 1889 and Bishop of Oxford from 1889 to 1901.

== Early life ==
The son of William Morley Stubbs, a solicitor, and his wife, Mary Ann Henlock, he was born in a house on the High Street in Knaresborough, Yorkshire, and was educated at Ripon Grammar School and Christ Church, Oxford, where he graduated MA in 1848, obtaining a first-class in Literae Humaniores and a third in mathematics.

== Education and career to 1889 ==
Stubbs was elected a Fellow of Trinity College, during his time living in Navestock, Essex, from 1850 to 1866, where he served as parish priest for the same period.

In 1859, he married Catherine Dellar, daughter of John Dellar, of Navestock, and they had several children. He was librarian at Lambeth Palace, and in 1862 was an unsuccessful candidate for the Chichele Professorship of Modern History at Oxford.

In 1866, Stubbs was appointed Regius Professor of Modern History at Oxford, and held the chair until 1884. His lectures were thinly attended, and he found them a distraction from his historical work. Some of his statutory lectures are published in his Lectures on Mediaeval and Modern History. In 1872, he founded Oxford University's School of Modern History, allowing postclassical history to be taught as a distinct subject for the first time. He accepted the patronage of the Stubbs Society during his time at Oxford, where he interacted with future doyens of the historical profession.

Stubbs was rector of Cholderton, Wiltshire, from 1875 to 1879, when he was appointed a canon of St Paul's Cathedral. He served on the ecclesiastical courts commission of 1881–1883 and wrote the weighty appendices to the report. On 25 April 1884 he was consecrated Bishop of Chester, and in 1889 became Bishop of Oxford until his death. As Bishop of Oxford he was also ex officio the Chancellor of the Order of the Garter. He was a Member of the Chetham Society, and served as vice-president from 1884.

== Approach to church office ==
Stubbs was a High Churchman whose doctrines and practice were grounded on learning and a veneration for antiquity. His opinions were received with marked respect by his brother prelates, and he acted as an assessor to the archbishop in the trial of Edward King, Bishop of Lincoln.

== Final illness and death ==
An attack of illness in November 1900 seriously impaired Stubbs's health. He was able, however, to attend the funeral of Queen Victoria on 2 February 1901, and preached a remarkable sermon before King Edward VII and the German Emperor Wilhelm II on the following day. Stubbs's illness became critical on 20 April. He died in Cuddesdon on 22 April 1901. Stubbs was buried in the churchyard of All Saints, Cuddesdon, next to the palace of the bishops of Oxford.

== Honours and degrees ==
Both in England and America, Stubbs was universally acknowledged as the head of all English historical scholars, and no English historian of his time was held in equal honour in European countries. Among his many distinctions he was D.D. and honorary D.C.L. of Oxford, LL.D. of Cambridge and Edinburgh, Doctor in utroque jure of Heidelberg; an hon. member of the University of Kiev, and of the Prussian, Bavarian and Danish academies; he received the Prussian order Pour le Mérite, and was corresponding member of the Académie des sciences morales et politiques of the French Institute. Stubbs was elected an International Honorary member of the American Academy of Arts and Sciences in 1881, an International Member of the American Philosophical Society in 1891, and a member of the American Antiquarian Society in 1897.

== Reception ==
Until Stubbs found it necessary to devote all his time to his episcopal duties, he had concentrated on historical study. He argued that the theory of the unity and continuity of history should not remove distinctions between ancient and modern history. He believed that work on ancient history is a useful preparation for the study of modern history, but either may advantageously be studied apart. He also believed that the effects of individual character and human nature will render generalizations vague and useless. While pointing out that history is useful as a mental discipline and a part of a liberal education, he recommended its study chiefly for its own sake. It was in this spirit that he worked; he had the faculty of judgment and a genius for minute and critical investigation. He was equally eminent in ecclesiastical history, as an editor of texts and as the historian of the British constitution.

=== Registrum sacrum, Constitutional History, and Select Charters ===
In 1858 Stubbs published his Registrum Sacrum Anglicanum, (with a second edition published in 1897) which sets forth episcopal consecration data in England from 597 CE, which was followed by many other later works, and particularly by his share in Councils and Ecclesiastical Documents, edited in co-operation with the Rev. A. W. Haddan, for the third volume of which he was especially responsible. He edited nineteen volumes for the Rolls series of Chronicles and Memorials.

It is, however, by Stubbs's Constitutional History of England (3 vols., 1874–78) that he is most widely known as a historian. It became at once the standard authority on its subject. The appearance of this book, which traces the development of the English constitution from the Teutonic invasions of Britain till 1485, marks a distinct step in the advance of English historical learning. It was followed by its companion volume of Select Charters and Other Illustrations of English Constitutional History.

=== His merits as a historian ===
By Stubbs's contemporaries and after his death, Stubbs was considered to have been in the front rank of historical scholars both as an author and a critic, and as a master of every department of the historian's work, from the discovery of materials to the elaboration of well founded theories and literary production. He was a good palaeographer, and excelled in textual criticism, in examination of authorship, and other such matters, while his vast erudition and retentive memory made him second to none in interpretation and exposition. His merits as an author are often judged solely by his Constitutional History.

However, Stubbs's work is not entirely unquestionable. Some modern historians have questioned his acceptance of some medieval chronicles, written by monastical scribes whose views would be, to some extent, influenced by the politics of the Catholic Church. One such criticism was Stubbs's tirade against William Rufus whose character was much-maligned by the chroniclers perhaps due to his opposition to Gregorian reforms during his reign, which led to Archbishop Anselm going into exile.

Among the most notable examples of Stubbs's work for the Rolls series are the prefaces to Roger of Hoveden, the Gesta regum of William of Malmesbury, the Gesta Henrici II, and the Memorials of St. Dunstan.

== Modern views of him ==
In the main Stubbs's ideas of a confrontational political framework have been superseded by K. B. McFarlane's "community of interest" theory; the idea that the amount of possible conflict between a king and his nobles was actually very small (case in point, Henry IV, 1399–1413). Historians like Michael Hicks, Rosemary Horrox and notably May McKisack, have pushed this view further.

J. W. Burrow proposed that Stubbs, like John Richard Green and Edward Augustus Freeman, was an historical scholar with little or no experience of public affairs, with views of the present which were romantically historicised and who was drawn to history by what was in a broad sense an antiquarian passion for the past, as well as a patriotic and populist impulse to identify the nation and its institutions as the collective subject of English history, making

the new historiography of early medieval times an extension, filling out and democratising, of older Whig notions of continuity. It was Stubbs who presented this most substantially; Green who made it popular and dramatic... It is in Freeman...of the three the most purely a narrative historian, that the strains are most apparent.

== Publications ==
- The medieval kingdoms of Cyprus and Armenia: two lectures delivered 26 and 29 October 1878. Oxford: E. Pickard Hall, M.A., and J.H. Stacy (1878)
- The constitutional History of England, 3 vols, 5th ed. (Oxford, 1891–98).
- The Constitutional History of England in Its Origin and Development, (sixth edition 1903) • Vol. I • Vol. II • Vol. III

== Sources ==
- Cam, Helen. "Stubbs Seventy Years after." Cambridge Historical Journal 9#2 (1948): 129–47. online.
- Letters of William Stubbs, Bishop of Oxford, ed. W. H. Hutton.
- Charles Petit-Dutaillis, Studies and Notes Supplementary to Stubbs' Constitutional History,
  - Volume One
  - Volume Two

Church of England titles
Preceded by William Jacobson	Bishop of Chester; 1884–1889	Succeeded by Francis Jayne
Preceded by John Mackarness	Bishop of Oxford; 1889–1901	Succeeded by Francis Paget
Academic offices
Preceded by Goldwin Smith	Regius Professor of Modern History at Oxford; 1866–1884	Succeeded by Edward Augustus Freeman
Professional and academic associations
Preceded by Walter Montagu Douglas Scott, 5th Duke of Buccleuch	President of the Surtees Society; 1884–1901	Succeeded by Henry Percy, 7th Duke of Northumberland
Preceded by Richard Copley Christie	Vice-President of the Chetham Society; 1884–1901	Succeeded by Henry Fishwick
Preceded by Thomas Glazebrook Rylands	President of the Historic Society of Lancashire and Cheshire; 1885–89	Succeeded by Francis John Jayne
