= Henry Guppy (librarian) =

British librarian (1861–1948)

Henry Guppy CBE

Librarian, John Rylands Library
- In office 1899 – 4 August 1948

Personal details
- Born: 31 December 1861
- Died: 4 August 1948 (aged 86)
- Occupation: Librarian

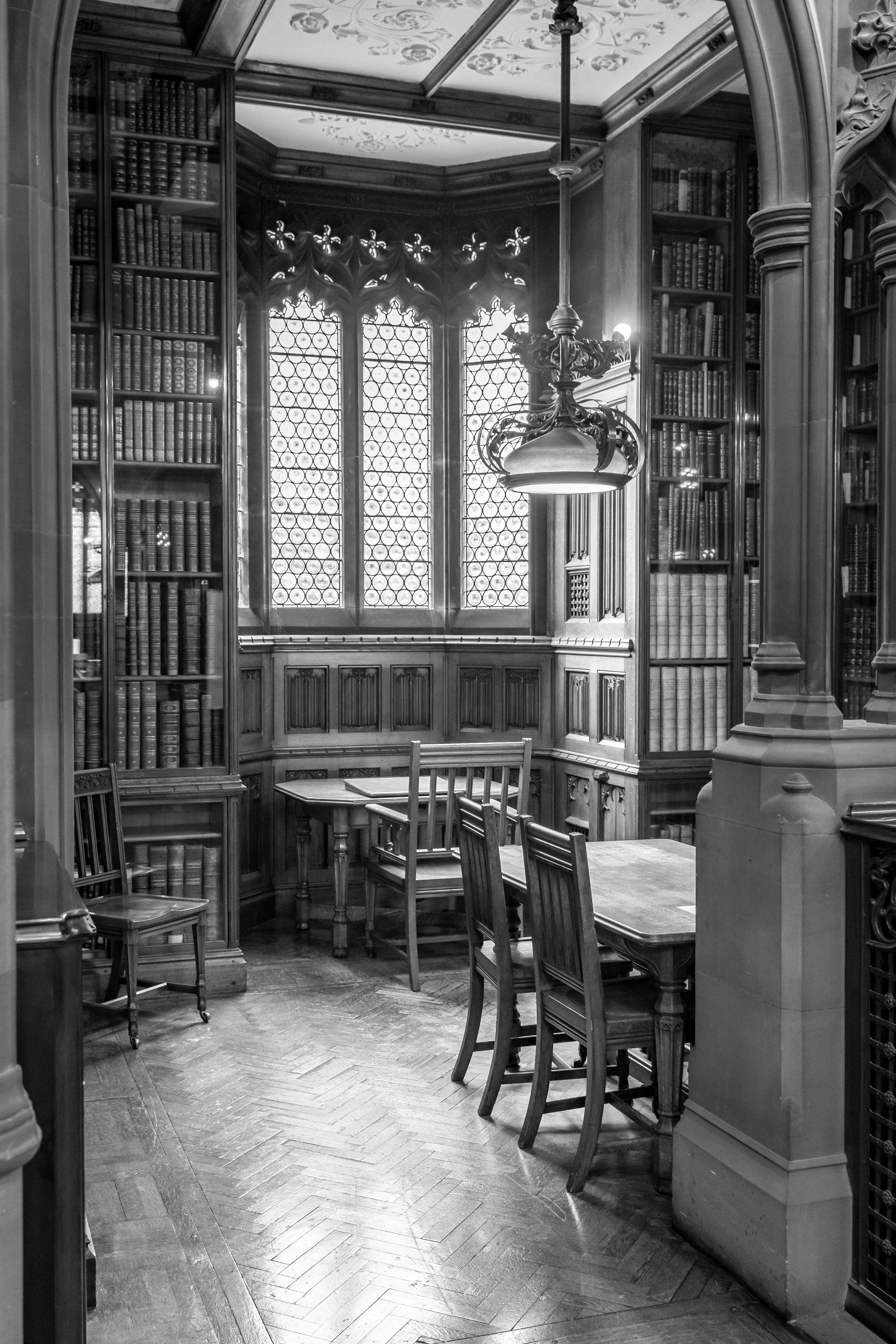
The reading room of the John Rylands Library, Deansgate

Henry Guppy CBE (31 December 1861 – 4 August 1948) was librarian of the John Rylands Library in Manchester from 1899 until his death in 1948.

Guppy was born in London and educated at City of London School. Before moving to the John Rylands he was Sub-Librarian of Sion College. When appointed librarian in 1899 it was jointly with Edward Gordon Duff; he became sole Librarian from October 1900. He was appointed Commander of the Order of the British Empire (CBE) in 1937. He was active in the Library Association of Great Britain and among his notable achievements are contributions to the reconstruction of the university library of Louvain between the World Wars and the founding of the Bulletin of the John Rylands Library in 1903, the same year he was elected to membership of the Manchester Literary and Philosophical Society on 20 October 1903.

During much of his tenure in Manchester he resided at Buxton, where he died. He was survived by his wife Matilda, with whom he had two daughters, Lilian and Alberta.

== Selected works ==
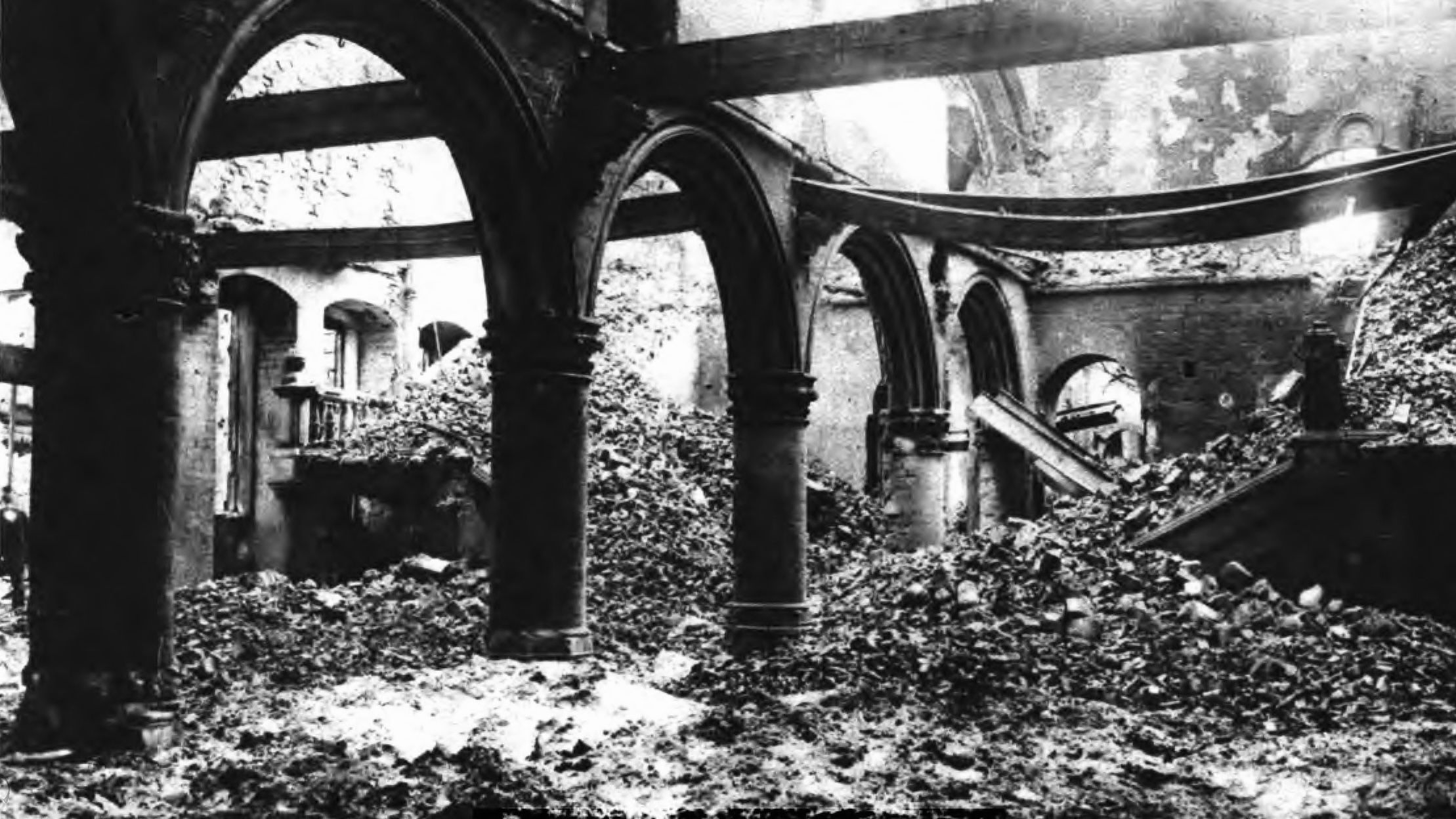
Destruction of the university library at Louvain, 1914

- Bulletin of the John Rylands Library, 1903–08, 1914-48 (editor and contributor).
- The John Rylands Library, Manchester, 1899-1935: a brief record of its history with descriptions of the building and its contents (revised edition of the work first published in 1924), 1935.
- A Classified Catalogue of the Works on Architecture and the Allied Arts in the Principal Libraries of Manchester and Salford (editor, with Guthrie Vine), 1909.
