= Helen O'Neill =

Helen O'Neill may refer to:

- Helen O'Neill (academic), development scholar and professor at University College Dublin
- Helen O'Neill (journalist), Australian freelance journalist and author
- Helen O'Neil (archaeologist) (1893–1984), English archaeologist

== See also ==
- Helen Neil, wife of Alexander Mackenzie, Prime Minister of Canada
