= Cambrian Archaeological Association =

Welsh historical society

The Cambrian Archaeological Association
- Cymdeithas Hynafiaethau Cymru
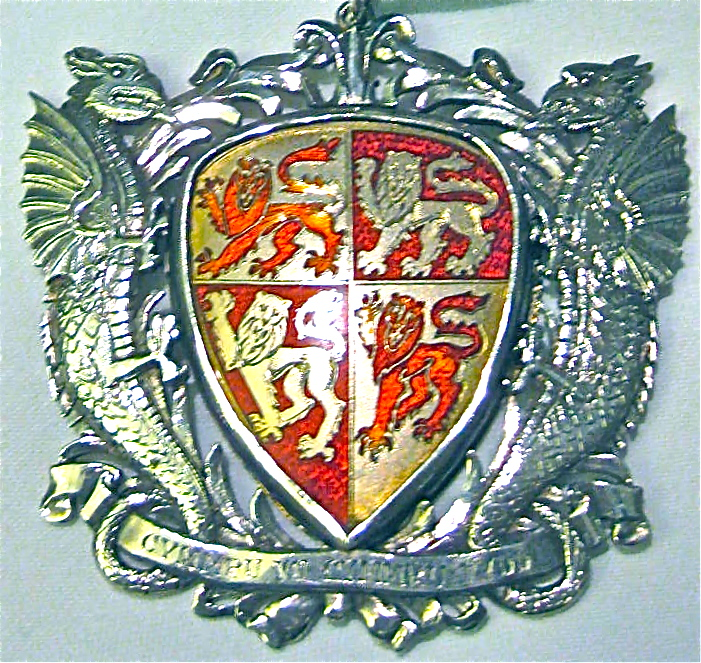
- Presidential badge of the Cambrians
- Formation: 1846/7
- Type: Learned society
- Registration no.: 216249
- Purpose: The study of the Archaeology, History and Culture of Wales and the Welsh Marches.
- Location: Wales
- Services: Research & Publications, Study Tours and Conferences, Grant-giving, Educational Awards and Prizes.
- Members: c550
- General Secretary: Heather James
- Chairman of Trustees: Dr. Sian Rees
- Website: cambrians.org.uk

The Cambrian Archaeological Association (Welsh: Cymdeithas Hynafiaethau Cymru) was founded in 1846 to examine, preserve and illustrate the ancient monuments and remains of the history, language, manners, customs, arts and industries of Wales and the Welsh Marches and to educate the public in such matters. The association's activities include sponsoring lectures, field visits, and study tours; as well as publishing its journal, Archaeologia Cambrensis, and monographs. It also provides grants to support research and publications.

== Activities ==
=== Meetings and lectures ===
The association holds two meetings each year, a week in mid-summer and an autumn weekend, visiting sites and monuments in all parts of Wales and, on occasions, in England, Scotland, Ireland and abroad. Easter conferences with lectures on matters of current concern in history and archaeology are held on a bi-annual basis. It arranges a lecture in the Welsh language each year at the National Eisteddfod.

=== Research grants and education awards ===
Research grants are awarded annually and are normally in the region of £500-£2000. In 2012 an award was made to Dr Toby Driver and Dr Jeffrey Davies for post-excavation work on their excavations at the Abermagwr Roman villa, Ceredigion. The Blodwen Jerman Schools Prize is awarded annually to a Welsh school for their promotion of Archaeology and History within the School. The G. T. Clark Prizes are awarded every five years for the most distinguished published contributions to the study of the archaeology and history of Wales and The Marches. There are five categories: Prehistory, Roman, Early Medieval, Medieval and Post-Medieval.

=== Publications ===
Apart from the journal Archaeologia Cambrensis, the association has a long tradition of publishing supplementary volumes on Welsh History and Archaeology. A most ambitious project was the publication in 1888 of a facsimile edition of Thomas Dineley's Progress of...Henry ..Duke of Beaufort (Lord President of the council in Wales and Lord Warden of the Marches) Thorough Wales in 1684. More recently the association has published between 1978 and 1998, in conjunction with Cadw, an important series of monographs on excavations in Wales. In 2013 it published a Festschrift, Reflections on the Past, on the theme of British prehistory and archaeology, to mark the longstanding contribution made by the prehistorian Frances Lynch to the work of the association. Other important publications by the association include:

- Sir Stephen Glynne (edited and transcribed by Archdeacon D. R. Thomas), Notes on the Older Churches in the Four Welsh Dioceses, 1903. These notes were made by the first president of the Cambrians between 1824 and 1874 and are particularly important as they describe many of the churches in Wales before they were altered by Victorian restorers.
- Rev John Skinner, Ten Days' Tour through the Isle of Anglesea December 1802, 1908. Skinner was a Somerset parson who travelled extensively throughout the British Isles recording archaeological monuments. Most of his manuscripts are now held by the Society of Antiquaries
- Edward Lhuyd, Parochialia, 3 parts, 1909–1911.
- Richard Fenton (ed. John Fisher), Tours in Wales (1804–1813), 1917. The publication of Richard Fenton's diaries in Cardiff Public Library, which describe Fenton's extensive travels within Wales, often accompanied by Sir Richard Colt-Hoare
- Edward Yardley (ed. Francis Green), Menavia Sacra, 1927. A description of the Diocese of St David's by Edward Yardley who was Archdeacon of Cardigan, 1739–1769.

== History ==
=== Antecedents and founding years, 1846–1855 ===
The Cambrian Archaeological Society was founded at a time when a sense of Welsh national identity was increasingly asserting itself. It was also at the moment that the dominance of the Antiquarian and Welsh learned societies centred in London were on the wane. There were two earlier learned Welsh Cultural societies in London; the Cymmrodorion founded in 1751 and the Cymreigyddion (who conducted all their business in the Welsh language) founded in 1770. The Cymmrodorion had ceased to meet in 1843, although it was re-established in 1873, while the Cymreigyddion disappeared completely in the 1850s. The premier English antiquarian society, the Society of Antiquaries of London, which had received its royal charter in 1745, was also in an impoverished state, having virtually bankrupted itself as the result of publishing ventures. In Scotland the Society of Antiquaries of Scotland had been established in Edinburgh in 1780, while in Ireland the Royal Irish Academy, established in 1786, had its own Antiquities Section, and in 1890 the Royal Society of Antiquaries of Ireland had been formed from the Kilkenny Archaeological Society.

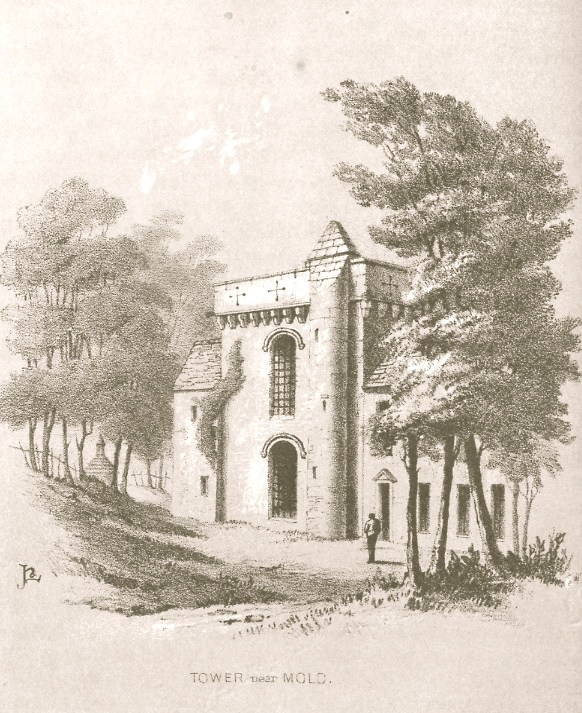
Tower, Broncoed, near Mold 1846. Soft Ground etching by Harry Longueville Jones, Archaeologia Cambrensis, vol. 1 (1846), p. 54

Against this background the British Archaeological Association was founded in 1844, and was followed rapidly by a breakaway group, the Royal Archaeological Institute, which pioneered a model of holding annual meetings or congresses in various parts of the British Isles and producing an annual journal (published in quarterly parts). This was the model adopted by Cambrian Archaeological Association for Wales and the Marches.

The driving figure in the establishment of the Cambrian Archaeological Association was the Rev. Harry Longueville Jones who was supported by the celticist the Rev John Williams. Rather than form a society directly, Longueville Jones produced a 'manifesto' -On the study and preservation of national antiquities- calling on interested people to join and form an association. Longueville Jones at this date was living at Beaumaris in Anglesey. Between 1834 and 1842 he lived in Paris, where he worked for the English language publisher Galignani and edited several editions of Galignani's Paris Guide. He worked with leading literary figures including William Thackeray. The ideas he put forward owed much to current developments in France, which followed the appointment in 1834 of the French novelist Prosper Mérimée as the first Inspector-General of Monuments Historiques. Longueville was also a talented artist and his work was used to illustrate early volumes of Archaeologia Cambrensis.

=== Early years 1847–1855 ===
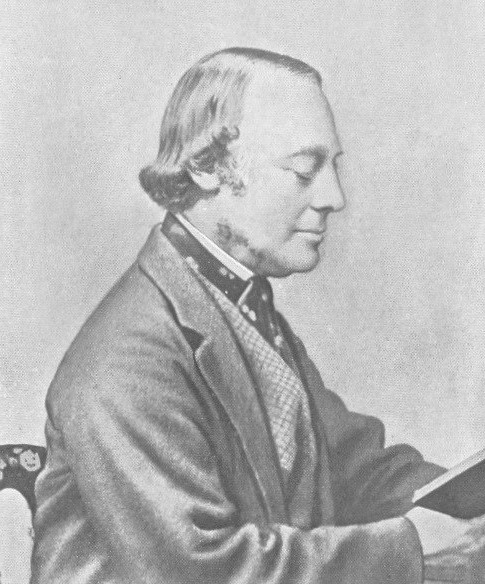
Sir Stephen Glynne, president 1847–1849

The first annual meeting of the Cambrian Archaeological Society was held at Aberystwyth between 7 and 10 September 1847, and the first president was Sir Stephen Richard Glynne. By the time of the second annual meeting at Caernarvon it was claimed that the membership had grown to 350. Initially the association was well supported by members of the Welsh Manuscripts Society. In 1849 Harry Longueville Jones resigned as joint general secretary on his appointment to the Civil Service position in the Privy Council office as Inspector for National Schools in Wales. This appointment was a result of the uproar that had been created by the publication of the 1847 Welsh Blue Book on Education. Jones remained a very active member of the association and resumed as editor of Archaeologia Cambrensis in 1855. He was succeeded as joint general secretary by the Rev Basil Jones, later to become Bishop of St David's.

Many scholars and academics were involved in the work of the association at this time. These included G. T. Clark, the manager of Dowlais Ironworks for Lady Charlotte Guest, who was to become a leading authority on British Castles. Clark's first article to be published in Archaeologia Cambrensis in 1853 was on Kidwelly Castle. It was accompanied by plans and drawings by a Mrs Trehearne engraved by John Henry le Keux.

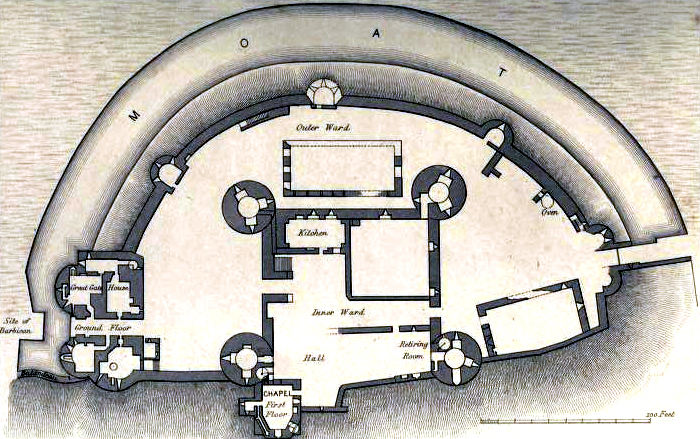
Kidwelly Castle plan used to illustrate G T Clark's article

Another figure was the youthful Edward Augustus Freeman, later celebrated as a medieval historian, and, from 1884, Regius Professor of Modern History at Oxford. Freeman submitted a series of articles on church architecture in Wales and on the domestic architecture of Pembrokeshire. Also in this group was John Obadiah Westwood, a notable Oxford entomologist, whose studies of inscribed and sculptured stones of the post Roman period was to provide a systematic approach to the subject. The Cambrian Archaeological Association was to sponsor the publication of Westwood's Lapidarium Walliæ: the early Inscribed and Sculptured Stones of Wales in 1876–1879. A final key figure was Rev Cardale Babington, who came from Ludlow in Shropshire. Professor of Botany at Cambridge, he was elected a Fellow of the Royal Society in 1851. Babington was also interested in archaeology, and joined the General Committee of the association in 1855: he was to chair the committee until 1882.

In the 1850s a schism developed among the membership of the Cambrians. John Williams, who had been to Jesus College, Oxford, and whose sympathies lay with the Tractarians (or Oxford Movement), belonged to an older school of celticism, which wished to promote the authenticity of the writings of Iolo Morganwg. Williams did not fit in with the members of the association, whose primary interests were in Welsh architecture and archaeology. The association was also in a poor state financially as there had been a failure to collect subscriptions. Williams resigned as general secretary and Editor late in 1853 and he was followed by other joint secretary the Rev Basil Jones who resigned at the Summer Meeting at Ruthin. The published list of members now shows that membership had shrunk to 163. Williams, following his resignation created an alternative society, the Cambrian Institute, publishers of the Cambrian Journal, which Williams edited until his death in 1863, when the Institute faded away.

=== The re-constituted association: 1856–1880s ===
Following the Ruthin meeting active steps were made to re-establish the association, the objectives were redefined and a new constitution was adopted at the Welshpool Meeting of the association in 1856. For much of this period the General Committee of the association was under the capable chairmanship of Cardale Babington (from 1864 to 1884) and the general secretary to the committee was the Rev E L Barnwell (from 1854 to 1875). At this point the association became more involved in Archaeology, sponsoring through an appeal the Rev David Davies' (their local Secretary for Montgomeryshire) excavations on the Roman auxiliary fort at Caersws which was published in Archaeologia Cambrensis in 1857.

Longueville Jones, who was travelling extensively in Wales as part of his duties as inspector of National schools, now had more time as editor of Archaeologia Cambrensis. He produced many articles and listings of archaeological sites, which furthered his campaign for the establishment of a Monuments Record and Inspectorate, and anticipated the formation of the Welsh Royal Commission in 1908. E L Barnwell also had a wide range of interests. Between 1855 and 1884 he contributed 102 articles and notes on a wide range of subjects to Archaeologia Cambrensis. His main interests were Archaeology, Vernacular Architecture, Medieval History and Genealogy. His last article in Archaeologia Cambrensis, "On Some South Wales Cromlechs", disputed some of the assertions in Ferguson's recently published "Rude Stone Monuments of all Countries" and provides an overview of Chambered Tombs in Wales.

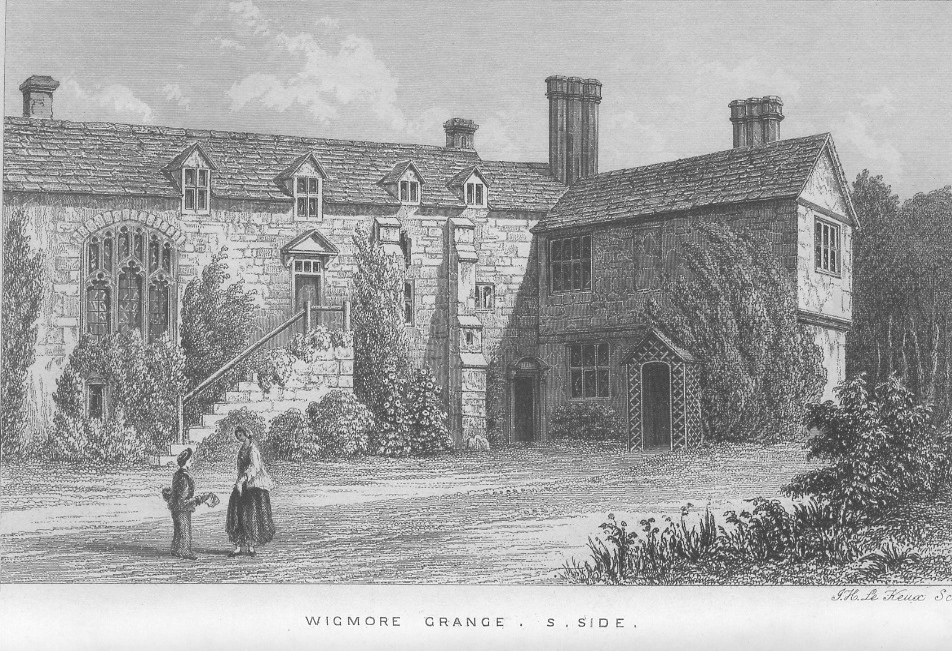
Wigmore Grange by Edward Blore 1872

Other important publications were by Hon W O Stanley on his excavation of tumuli in Anglesey and one on Wigmore Abbey and Monastic Grange in Herefordshire by Edward Blore. Blore was a leading architect, who had been employed by Queen Victoria to re-build Buckingham Palace and he was an accomplished topographical artist specialising in later Medieval architecture. His drawings of Wigmore Grange were engraved by John le Keux and are some of the finest topographical prints published in Archaeologia Cambrensiis.

The Cambrians also established a relationship with the "Office of Woods and Forests" who were responsible for Castles and other monuments belonging to the Crown in Wales. The Cambrians had already influenced Salvin's restoration of Caernarvon Castle and made a financial contribution towards it. They now inaugurated a scheme whereby the Office would lease Castles and other monuments to members of the association so that they could be preserved and restored. The Rev E L Barnwell, took up a lease of Denbigh Castle on behalf of the association. Slightly later the monastery of Strata Florida was leased by the association so that it could be safeguarded and displayed to the public.

=== Late Victorian period to the end of the First World War ===
By the early 1880s few of the original members or the association were still active. Cardale Babbington resigned as chairman of the General Committee in 1884, and was replaced by Archdeacon D. R. Thomas, who remained as chairman until 1916. New figures included John Rhys, who had become Professor of Celtic at Oxford in 1877. The emphasis changes slightly with more emphasis on Celtic studies and Alfred Neobard Palmer, who contributed articles on the local history of the Wrexham area and the medieval borough of Holt. The great Welsh historian, Sir J. E. Lloyd joined the association in 1896. The greatest impact was made by John Romilly Allen whose family came from Narberth in Pembrokeshire. Romilly Allen joined the Cambrian Archaeological Association in 1875, was elected a member of the general committee in 1877, became one of two editors of its Journal in 1889, and was sole editor from 1892 until his death in 1907. Romilly Allen was to replace Westwood (who died in 1893) as the acknowledged expert on inscribed and sculptured stones of the post Roman period and his researches in Scotland are even better known than those he undertook in Wales. Romilly Allen campaigned for a Welsh National Museum and wrote scathing criticisms when antiquities were acquired by British Museum; the Grosvenor Museum in Chester purchased some Bronze Age urns from North Wales and particularly when the Late Iron Age Trawsfynydd Tankard was removed to Liverpool Museum. It was fitting that the National Museum of Wales was granted its foundation charter in 1907, the year of Romilly Allen's death.

Romilly Allen was also very adverse to what he perceived as other bodies interfering in Welsh matters. In 1886 the Cambrians launched an appeal to sponsor an excavation at Strata Florida. The Cistercian Abbey had been taken into "guardianship" by the association and the intention was to provide a plan of the abbey and to make it accessible for visitors. The excavation were placed in the hands of Stephen Williams and he started work in June 1887. The excavations did not find favour with J. W. Willis-Bund, who was the local secretary of the Society of Antiquaries for South Wales. Bund denigrated William's work, alleging "the mischief likely to be done if the excavations were continued without the direction of some competent person". This was not taken well by the association, but St John Hope, the Assistant Secretary of the Antiquaries gave advice and was able to mediate. Later, Romilly Allen, as editor of Archaeologia Cambrensis, commented that "the Cambrian Archaeological Association has always shown itself willing to receive advice courteously offered, but it can never admit the contention that the Society of Antiquaries has the right to send its officials to Wales to dictate how explorations should be conducted".

The association was now becoming more adventurous as far its summer meetings and increasingly started to visit other 'Celtic' lands outside Wales and the Marches. The first of these visits was to Truro in 1862, followed by the Isle of Man in 1865. More ambitious was the visit to Brittany in 1889 and in 1891 Professor John Rees organised a trip to Kerry in Ireland. The most ambitious meeting was in 1899 when the association hired a steamer to voyage round the Western Isles of Scotland to visit remote sites and see sculptured stones. The social life on these yearly trips and meetings from 1908 onwards is well described in Evelyn Lewes' book Out with the Cambrians, which was published in 1934.

Following the death in 1907 of Romilly Allen, the Rev Rupert Morris, originally from Holywell in Flintshire took over the editorship. Morris had joined the Cambrians in 1875 and in 1892 he had become Chaplain and Librarian to the Duke of Westminster at Eaton Hall near Chester. Morris immersed himself in the history of Chester, his most notable publication being Chester during the Plantagenet and Tudor Reigns, published in 1894, and he also edited the Chester Archaeological Journal. He then moved to St Gabriel's, Pimlico, a large London parish in the Duke's patronage. It was from here that he edited Archaeologia Cambrensis until his death in 1917. With the onset of the First World War the association was able initially to keep up its publication programme, but then reduced the issues of Archaeologia Cambrensis to two each year. The summer meetings were abandoned, with a general meeting being called each year at Shrewsbury. Much of the organisation of the association was undertaken by the noted geologist and Palaeolithic archaeologist William Boyd Dawkins, who had been born at Buttington, near Welshpool. Boyd Dawkins, who was knighted in 1917, stood in as president of the association between 1914 and 1919.

=== 1918–1950 ===
By the mid-1920s the influence of the recently established National Museum of Wales starts to make its mark on the association. Mortimer Wheeler was appointed keeper of archaeology in 1922, and in 1924 he became director of the museum. He immediately started on notable excavations on the Roman sites of Segontium on the outskirts of Caernarvon and Brecon Gaer. These volumes were published in Y Cymmrodor, an annual journal of the Society of Cymmrodorion rather than in Archaeologia Cambrensis, presumably because the Cambrians would not devote a single volume to each excavation. Archaeologia Cambrensis was still being published quarterly in a quarto format, which could not be adapted for the publication of excavation reports with large plans. As a result, Archaeologia Cambrensis was changed to the larger quarto format in 1928. 'Mortimer Wheeler encouraged non-professional archaeologists, such as the Bangor Architect Harold Hughes and Dr Willoughby Gardner in their research on Hillforts of Northern Wales. This research had started in 1909 and in his presidential address to the Cambrians in 1924, Willoughby Gardner gives an extensive review of this research, illustrated with plans. They were later to survey Ffridd Faldwyn, Montgomery near Montgomery. This work was to form the basis for the excavations that followed at Ffridd Faldwyn by St John O'Neill, the Office of Works Inspector in Wales. Also Sir Cyril Fox, who succeeded Wheeler as the Director of the National Museum of Wales, published his survey of Offa's Dyke in parts in Archaeologia Cambrensis. It was afterwards republished as one volume by the British Academy in 1955.

In the War Years, from 1939 to 1945, the Cambrians were unable to hold any meetings, but volumes of Archaeologia Cambrensis continued to be produced. In 1946, to commemorate the centenary of the association, the volume for that year was entitled 100 Years of Welsh Archaeology 1846–1956, which was a masterful survey of the state of knowledge about Welsh Archaeology. In the 1940s the noted church architectural historian Fred Crossley, together with Maurice Ridgeway, started a detailed county by county survey of roods screens, lofts and carved woodwork in Welsh Churches.

== Presidents ==
In the early days of the Cambrian Archaeological Association the position of the president of the society went to a member of the landed gentry or aristocracy in Wales or the Welsh Marches, as well as to Welsh bishops and senior figures in the Anglican Church. The first president was Sir Stephen Glynne, the brother-in-law of William Gladstone, a passionate ecclesiologist, who was a guiding figure of the association for many years. The main intention of the presidency was, and still to some extent is, to provide an entree for visits and the organisation of the summer general meeting. It is normal for the presidency to be held for one year, but on some occasions it has been held for longer. Nearly all the early presidents were either clerics in the Anglican Church or had at some time been Members of Parliament. It is very clear that the summer meetings were used as a forum (outside the formal events), for the discussion of matters not directly associated with archaeology or Welsh history. Most notably a number of the presidents were members of the Canterbury Society, an association for the colonisation of the South Island of New Zealand. Also many were directly involved in the railway companies which were opening up Wales at the time, most notably Earl Vane Tempest, later Lord Londonderry of Machynlleth, president in 1866, who was the chairman of the Cambrian Railways. This does not imply that the majority of the presidents were uninterested in archaeology. The Earl of Dunraven of Dunraven Castle in Glamorgan, president in 1849 and 1869, while not involved in Welsh archaeology, was a leading Irish intellectual and Celtic scholar, as well as a supporter of Catholic Emancipation. Many of the other presidents who were MPs were leading Antiquaries, particularly Octavius Morgan and Stanley Leighton – the latter was the founding figure of SPAB. Equally most of the bishops and churchmen, who were presidents, were leading academics. The scholarly Rev Basil Jones, the second secretary of the association, later became the president in 1878, after his elevation to the Bishopric of St David's.

A change starts to appear in 1881, when Professor Cardale Babington a botanist and archaeologist at Cambridge University, became president. Babington was also chairman of the General Committee of Association for many years. Babington was followed in 1891 by the noted celticist Prof John Rhys of Oxford, the Assyriologist Rev Prof A H Sayce, also of Oxford. In 1895 and 1896 the renowned legal historian and Lord Chancellor, Hardinge Giffard, 1st Earl of Halsbury served twice as president. The archaeologist and geologist Professor Sir William Boyd Dawkins, who was president for six years and successfully steered the association through the years of the First World War.

After the First World War, further changes in the presidency are apparent. Leading archaeologists (Sir) Mortimer Wheeler (1930) and (Sir) Cyril Fox (1933); architects: Harold Hughes (1930) and W. D. Caröe (1936); historians and celticists Sir John Edward Lloyd(1937) and Prof R. A. S. Macalister (1932 and 1934), were amongst the presidents. Since the Second World War the presidents have been a mixture of leading academics, professional architects and archaeologists, the occasional Anglican cleric, and local historians, such as J. D. K. Lloyd of Montgomery, the editor of Archaeologia Cambrensis for many years. While women such as Angharad Llwyd had been allowed to join the Cambrians in their own right from an early date, it was not until 1988 that Frances Lynch became first female president. Since then there have been five further women presidents.

== Annual General Meetings & Summer Conferences, and Presidents ==
- 1847 Aberystwyth: Sir Stephen Glynne
- 1848 Caernarvon: Sir Stephen Glynne
- 1849 Cardiff: Edwin Wyndham-Quin, 3rd Earl of Dunraven and Mount-Earl Viscount Adare
- 1850 Dolgellau: William Watkin Edward Wynne
- 1851 Tenby: John Campbell, 2nd Earl Cawdor
- 1852 Ludlow: Hon Robert Henry Clive MP
- 1853 Brecon: Sir Joseph Bailey, 1st Baronet MP
- 1854 Ruthin: Frederick Richard West MP
- 1855 Llandeilo Fawr: George Rice-Trevor, 4th Baron Dynevor
- 1856 Welshpool: Edward James Herbert, 3rd Earl of Powis
- 1857 Monmouth: Octavius Morgan
- 1858 Rhyl: Bishop Thomas Vowler Short of St Asaph
- 1859 Cardigan: Bishop Connop Thirwall of St David's
- 1860 Bangor: Charles Griffith Wynne later Charles Wynne-Finch

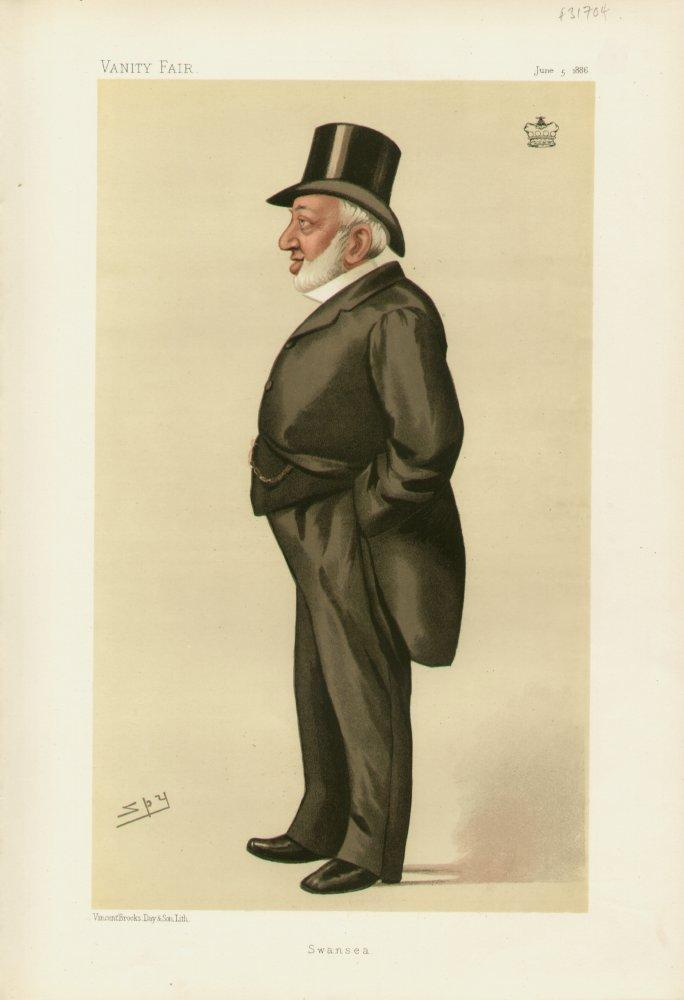
Henry Hussey Vivian, president 1860–62, Vanity Fair, 1886

- 1861 Swansea: Henry Hussey Vivian
- 1862 Truro: Henry Hussey Vivian
- 1863 Kington: Sir John Benn Walsh Bt MP
- 1864 Haverfordwest: John Henry Scourfield
- 1865 Douglas, Isle of Man: Henry Bougham Loch
- 1866 Machynlleth: George H. R. C. W. Vane-Tempest, or The Earl Vane
- 1867 Hereford: F B Twisleton-Wykeham-Fiennes, 16th Baron Saye and Sele
- 1868 Portmadoc: E. F. Coulson
- 1869 Bridgend: Edwin Richard Wyndham-Quin, 3rd Earl of Dunraven
- 1870 Holyhead: John Wynne Jones, Archdeacon of Bangor
- 1871 Hereford: John Wynne Jones, Archdeacon of Bangor
- 1872 Brecon: Sir Joseph Bailey, 2nd Baronet MP
- 1873 Knighton: Arthur Walsh

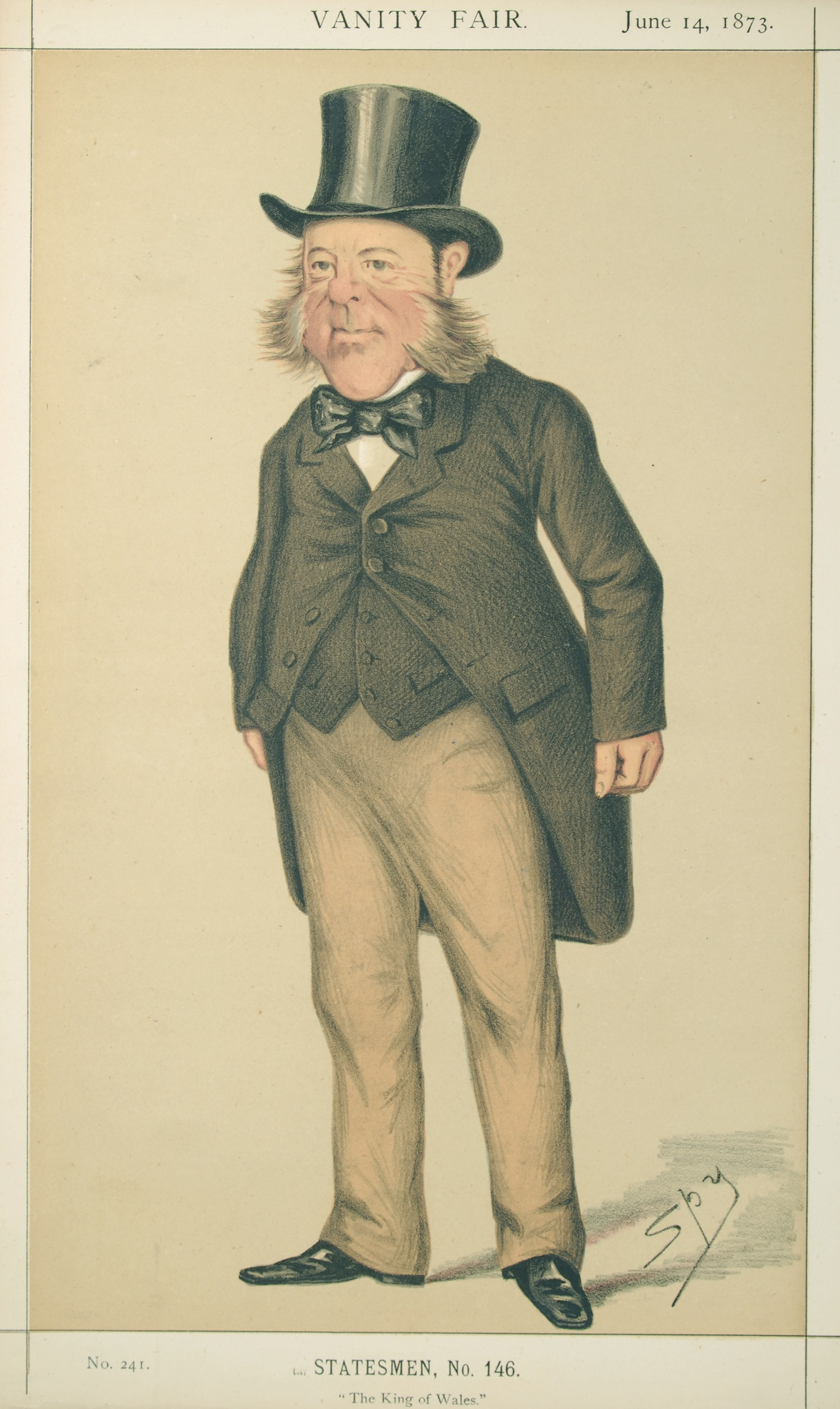
Sir Watkin Williams-Wynn, president 1873–74, 1883–84, Vanity Fair, 1873

- 1874 Wrexham: Sir Watkin Williams -Wynn 6th Baronet
- 1875 Carmarthen: Bishop William Basil Jones of St David's
- 1876 Abergavenny: Professor Edward Augustus Freeman
- 1877 Caernarvon: Admiral Lord Clarence Paget
- 1878 Lampeter: Bishop William Basil Jones of St David's
- 1879 Welshpool: Charles Watkin Williams-Wynn
- 1880 Pembroke: C. E. G. Philipps
- 1881 Church Stretton: Professor Cardale Babington
- 1882 Llanrwst: H. R. Sandbach
- 1883 Fishguard: C. E. G. Philipps
- 1884 Bala: Sir Watkin Williams-Wynn 6th Baronet
- 1885 Newport: Lord Tredegar

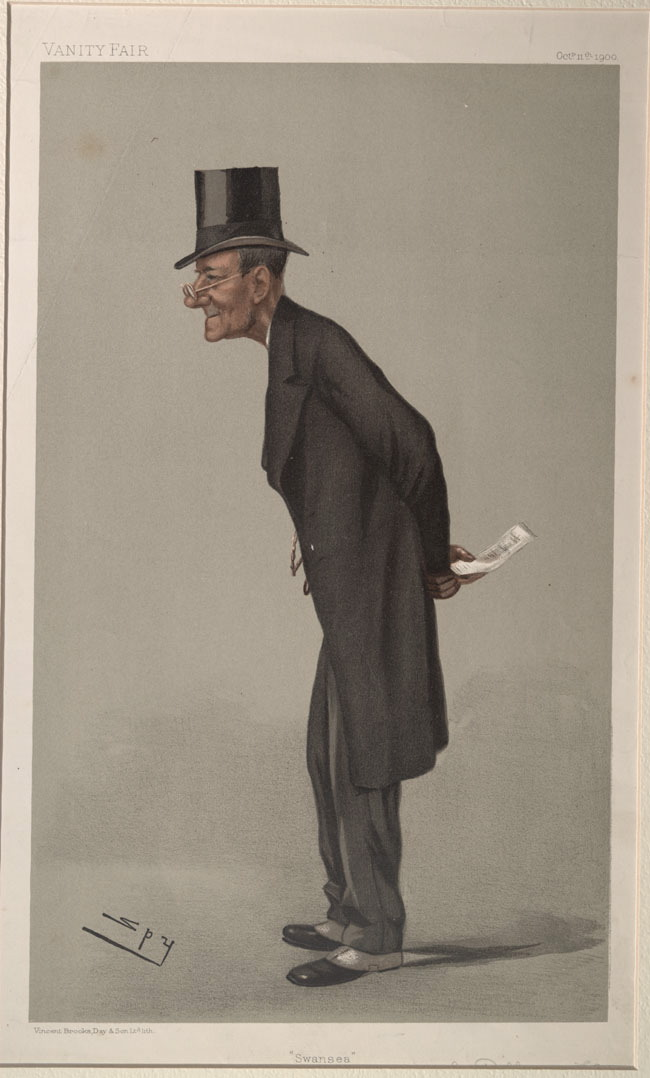
John Dillwyn-Llewelyn, president 1885–86, Vanity Fair, 1900

- 1886 Swansea: John Talbot Dillwyn Llewellyn
- 1887 Denbigh: Charles Salusbury Mainwaring
- 1888 Cowbridge: Richard Lewis, Bishop of Llandaff
- 1889 Brittany & London: Dr le Closmadeuc
- 1890 Holywell: Llewelyn N. V. Lloyd-Mostyn, 3rd Baron Mostyn
- 1891 Kerry, Ireland: Prof John Rhys
- 1892 Llandeilo Fawr: Sir James William Drummond
- 1893 Oswestry: Stanley Leighton MP, FSA
- 1894 Caernarvon: George Douglas-Pennant, 2nd Baron Penrhyn
- 1895 Launceston, Cornwall: Hardinge Giffard, 1st Earl of Halsbury
- 1896 Aberystwyth: Hardinge Giffard, 1st Earl of Halsbury
- 1897 Haverfordwest: F. Lloyd Philipps
- 1898 Ludlow: Sir Owen H. P. Scourfield
- 1899 West Coast of Scotland and London: Lord Windsor
- 1900 Merthyr Tydfil: Lord Aberdare
- 1901 Newtown: Lieut-Col E Pryce Jones
- 1902 Brecon: Joseph Bailey, 2nd Baron Glanusk
- 1903 Portmadoc: Richard Henry Wood
- 1904 Cardigan: John William Willis-Bund
- 1905 Shrewsbury: D. H. Thomas, Archdeacon of Montgomery
- 1906 Carmarthen: Sir John Williams 1st Baronet
- 1907 Llangefni: Sir Richard H. Williams Bulkely
- 1908 Monmouth: Rev Prof A. H. Sayce

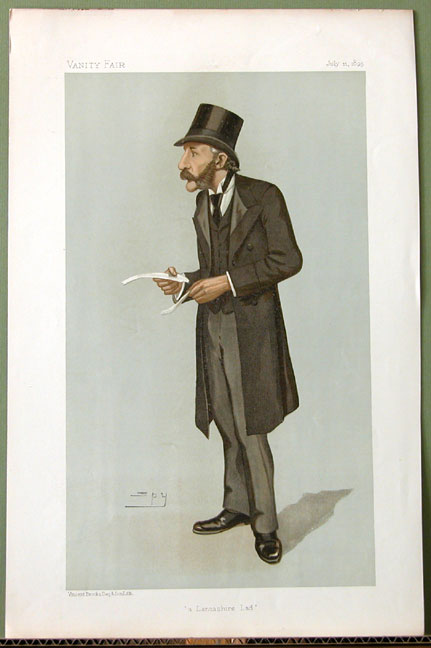
Sir Henry Hoyle Howarth, president 1908–09, Vanity Fair, 1895

- 1909 Chester: Sir Henry Hoyle Howarth
- 1910 Llandrindod Wells: Charles Dillwyn-Venables-Llewellyn
- 1911 Abergele: Professor William Boyd Dawkins
- 1912 Cardiff: Robert Windsor-Clive, 1st Earl of Plymouth
- 1913 Devizes: Professor William Boyd Dawkins
- 1914 Shrewsbury: Professor William Boyd Dawkins
- 1915 Shrewsbury: Professor William Boyd Dawkins
- 1916 Shrewsbury:Professor William Boyd Dawkins
- 1917 Shrewsbury: Professor William Boyd Dawkins
- 1918 Shrewsbury: Professor William Boyd Dawkins
- 1919 Dolgellau: Sir E. Vincent Evans
- 1920 Swansea: Lt Col W. Ll. Morgan
- 1921 Ruthin: Sir E Vincent Evans
- 1922 Haverfordwest: Sir Evan D. Jones Bt MP
- 1923 Oswestry: Prof J. E. Lloyd
- 1924 Brittany: Prof H. G. Fleure
- 1925 Llandeilo Fawr: Hon. Charles Urien Rhys MP
- 1926 Pwllheli: Willoughby Gardner
- 1927 Hereford: Rev E. Hermitage Day
- 1928 Aberafan: H. J. Randall
- 1929 Douglas, Isle of Man: P. M. C. Kermode
- 1930 Menai Bridge: H Harold Hughes
- 1931 Lampeter: Mortimer Wheeler
- 1932 Newtown: Prof R. A. S. Macalister
- 1933 Cardiff: Cyril Fox
- 1934 Galway: Prof R. A. S. Macalister
- 1935 Llangollen: Archdeacon C. F. Roberts
- 1936 Abergavenny: W. D. Caröe
- 1937 Bangor: Sir John Edward Lloyd
- 1938 Tenby: Rev D. L. Prosser, Bishop of St David's
- 1939 Shrewsbury Emergency Meeting
- 1940–1945 No meetings
- 1946 Aberystwyth: David Ormsby-Gore, 5th Baron Harlech
- 1947 Rhyl: Lord Mostyn
- 1948 Carmarthen: Rev D. L. Prosser, Archbishop of Wales
- 1949 Harlech: Sir Ifor Williams
- 1950 Carlisle: Sir Ifor Williams
- 1951 Brecon: Edward Williamson, Bishop of Swansea and Brecon
- 1952 Bangor: Robert Richards MP
- 1953 Chepstow: V. E. Nash Williams
- 1954 Shrewsbury: J. D. K. Lloyd
- 1955 Nefyn: Wilfrid James Hemp
- 1956 Haverfordwest: Sir Frederick Rees, High Sheriff of Pembrokeshire
- 1957 Bala: Canon Ellis Davies
- 1958 Presteigne: T. Alwyn Lloyd
- 1959 Ruthin: Professor A. H. Dodd
- 1960 Swansea: Professor William Rees
- 1961 Dublin: C. A. Ralegh Radford
- 1962 Newtown: E. D. Jones
- 1963 Cardiff: Professor W. F. Grimes
- 1964 Llangefni: Professor T. Jones Pierce
- 1965 Hereford: Bishop Glyn Simon of Llandaff
- 1966 Chester: George Lloyd

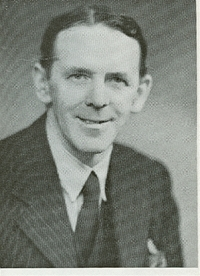
Prof E. G. Bowen, president 1966–67

- 1967 Carmarthen: Professor E. G. Bowen
- 1968 Glasgow: Professor Idris Foster
- 1969 Vale of Conway: A. J. Taylor
- 1970 Caerleon: E. I. P. Bowen
- 1971 Harlech: C. E. Vaughan Owen
- 1972 Lampeter: A. H. A. Hogg
- 1973 Wrexham: H. Mostyn Lewis
- 1974 South Brecknock: Canon J. Jones Davies
- 1975 Winchester: Dr H. N. Savoury
- 1976 Carmarthen: D. J. Cathcart King
- 1977 Aberystwyth: D. J. Cathcart King
- 1978 Caerleon: Donald Moore
- 1979 Bangor: Peter Smith
- 1980 Swansea: Professor Glanmor Williams
- 1981 Chester: H. Noel Jerman
- 1982 Cumbria: Professor Leslie Alcock
- 1983 Cardiff: Sir Cennydd Traherne
- 1984 Anglesey: Henry A Wheeler
- 1985 Carmarthen: Major Francis Jones
- 1986 Weston-super-Mare: George C. Boon
- 1987 Hereford: Professor J. Gwynn Williams
- 1988 Leinster, Ireland: Frances Lynch
- 1989 Llandudno: Trefor M. Owen
- 1990 Llandrindod Wells: Professor D. Ellis Evans
- 1991 Dolgellau: Professor R. Geraint Gruffydd
- 1992 St David's: W. Gwyn Thomas
- 1993 Portlaoise, Ireland: Morfydd Owen
- 1994 Caerleon: Rev Dr David Williams
- 1995 Flintshire: Canon M. H. Ridgway
- 1996 Morlaix, Brittany: Professor P. R. Giot
- 1997 Aberystwyth: Glyn Lewis Jones
- 1998 York and Yorkshire: Dr Lawrence Butler
- 1999 Galway, Ireland: Professor Etienne Ryan
- 2000 Swansea: Keith Mascetti
- 2001 Forest of Dean: Jeremy Knight
- 2002 Caernarfon and Lleyn: Dr Geoffrey Wainwright
- 2003 Milton Keynes: Professor Muriel E. Chamberlain
- 2004 Rouen/Kington & Llandrindod Wells: Rev Dr R. W. D. Fenn
- 2005 Bala: Jeffrey Davies
- 2006 Chester: Richard Avent
- 2007 Carmarthen: Thomas Lloyd (Welsh Herald)
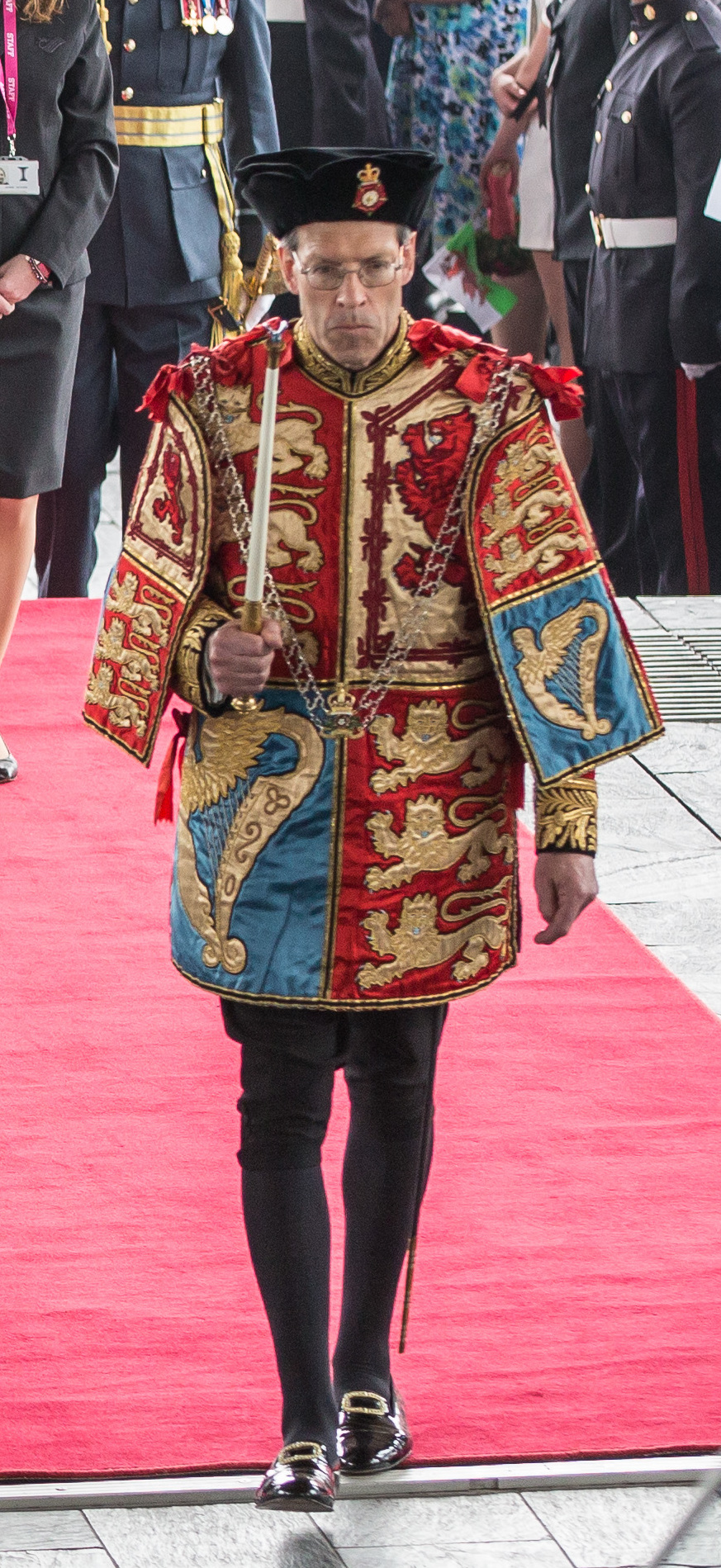
  Thomas Lloyd Wales Herald Extraordinary
- 2008 Bettws-y-Coed: Professor Alan J. Carr
- 2009 Ebbw Vale: Richard G. Keen
- 2010 Canterbury: Rev. J. Wyn Evans, Bishop of St David's
- 2011 Gascony: Professor Gwyn Meirion-Jones
- 2012 Anglesey: David Longley
- 2013 Brittany: Dr Siân Rees
- 2014 Dumfries and Galloway: Professor W. H. Manning
- 2015 Lampeter: Professor David Austin
- 2016 Vale of Clwyd: Dr John Kenyon
- 2017 Ironbridge: Professor Prys Morgan
- 2018 Llandridod Wells: Dr Mark Redknap
- 2019 Haverfordwest: Professor Nancy Edwards
- 2020 Professor Michael Jones
- 2021 Lincoln: Dr Eurwyn Wiliam
- 2022 Ribble Valley: Dr Elizabeth Walker
- 2023 Saintes, France: Professor Alasdair Whittle
- 2024 Hay-on-Wye: Gwilym Hughes
- 2025 Bangor: Professor Huw Pryce

== Bibliography ==
- Edwards, Nancy; Gould, John (2013). "From Antiquarians to Archaeologists in Nineteenth-Century Wales: The Question of Prehistory". In Evans, N.; Pryce, H. (eds.). Writing a Small Nation's Past: Wales in Comparative Perspective 1850–1950. Farnham: Ashgate. pp. 143–164.
- Fenn, R. W. D. (2005). "R. W. Banks and the Cambrian Archaeological Association". Archaeologia Cambrensis. 154: 1–16.
- Lewes, Evelyn (1934). Out with the Cambrians. London: Williams and Norgate.
- Jarman, H. Noel. "Contacts with the Cambrians for over Fifty Years". Archaeologia Cambrensis. 131: 1–17.
- Jenkins, R. T.; Ramage, Helen M. (1951). A History of the Honourable Society of Cymmrodorion and of the Gwyneddigion and Cymreigyddion Societies (1751–1951). Y Cymmrodor. Vol. 50. London: Honourable Society of Cymmrodorion.
- Lloyd, Sir John Edward (1946). "Introduction: A History of the Cambrian Archaeological Association". In Nash-Williams, V. E. (ed.). A Hundred Years of Welsh Archaeology: Centenary Volume 1846–1946. Gloucester: Cambrian Archaeological Association.
- Moore, Donald. "Cambrian Meetings 1847–1997: A Society's Contribution in a Changing Archaeological Scene". Archaeologia Cambrensis. 147: 1–54.
- Roberts, Archdeacon (1935). "The Past History of the Association". Archaeologia Cambrensis.
- Stephens, Meic, ed. (1986). The Oxford Companion to the Literature of Wales. Oxford: Oxford University Press. p. 68. ISBN 0192115863.
- Thomas, Sir Ben Bowen (1978). "The Cambrians and the Nineteenth-century Crisis in Welsh Studies, 1847–1870". Archaeologia Cambrensis. 127: 1–15.
- Williams, H. G. (1991). "Longueville Jones and Welsh Education: The neglected case of a Victorian H.M.I.". Welsh History Review. 15 (3): 416–42.
