= Anglesey Antiquarian Society =

Local history society in Wales

- Cymdeithas Hynafiaethwyr Môn
- Formation: 5 October 1911; 115 years ago
- Type: Historical society; Nonprofit
- Registration no.: 507837
- Legal status: Charity
- Official languages: English; Welsh
- Patron: Marquess of Anglesey
- President: Robin Grove-White
- Life Vice-President: Frances Lynch
- Website: www.hanesmon.org.uk

The Anglesey Antiquarian Society (AAS; Welsh: Cymdeithas Hynafiaethwyr Môn) is a local history group that focuses on the history, archaeology and environment of Anglesey (Welsh: Ynys Môn) in Wales (Welsh: Cymru). It was founded in 1911 and continues to be an active society, hosting lectures and excursions as well as publishing books, a quarterly newsletter and annual Transactions of scholarly papers.

== History ==
On 5 October 1911 a public meeting was held of people interested in the history of Anglesey and concerned about the possible loss of archaeological sites and historical buildings. It was prompted by the destruction of a Bronze Age burial mound by the laying of a railway near Pentraeth in 1908; quick action by local antiquarians managed to rescue a few artefacts from the site. It was resolved to explore the formation of a society and over the next few months a provisional committee was appointed, rules were drafted, and members elected. By the time of the first official meeting on 30 April 1912 the society had 175 members, including 14 members of the aristocracy and gentry, 25 clergy, eight teachers, two academics and three members of Parliament (but only five women).

The two driving forces behind setting up the society were Lord Boston and his brother-in-law, the solicitor E. Neil Baynes. Boston's Anglesey seat was Plas Lligwy, near Moelfre, which overlooks the site of a Romano-British village, Din Lligwy. They were both keen amateur archaeologists, and together they excavated the site in 1905 and published the results three years later. Boston was appointed president of the society after the initial meeting in 1911. At the first annual meeting of the AAS in 1912 Baynes delivered a lecture on Prehistoric Man in Anglesey after Boston's presidential address. He went on to contribute 67 more articles to the AAS Transactions up to 1947.

The 50th anniversary of the society was marked by a special meeting in Llangefni on 18 November 1961, where it was noted only three of the founder members were still alive, including Neil Baynes. In 2011 the society celebrated its centenary with a major conference and exhibition, as well as a special volume of the Transactions with papers exploring the eminent historians and antiquarians of the island, histories of excavations and connections to the wider world, and of the society's activities over the previous 100 years.

In 1968 a Junior Section was set up for children aged 11 to 16, which attracted interest from over 200 youth. They were involved in excavations and excursions.

== Activities ==
The purpose of the society, as stated in the original rules, is "the practical study of Archaeology, Natural Science, Art, Literature, History and kindred subjects as far as they pertain to Anglesey; also the preservation of historical documents, ancient monuments, rare birds and plants, and objects of geological or other scientific interest in the Island." This is accomplished by having several meetings each year where lectures are given, organizing excursions where members can visit various historical or natural sites on the island, and publishing scholarly articles in the annual Transactions. In 1966 the society published the first in its Studies in Anglesey History series of books, which now numbers 14 volumes.

In the early days the society also acted to monitor and protect historical and archaeological sites. The island was divided into 15 districts and an observer was appointed for each one. Their task was to visit all the known sites of interest in their district and report on their condition. If any sites were damaged or threatened with damage the committee was to be notified, as well as any official bodies such as H.M. Office of Works. This continued into the 1960s.

A number of archaeological excavations were undertaken or funded by the society. In the late 1920s they supported investigations into the Neolithic passage tomb Bryn Celli Ddu. In 1955 they oversaw excavation of a Mesolithic site at Trwyn Du, near Aberffraw, and two years later at another Aberffraw site thought to be the medieval palace of Llywelyn the Great Prince of Gwynedd. In 1993 work by the society at a site in Llanfaes thought to be a medieval marketplace found a number of items, including a 12th-century papal seal and numerous coins, buckles and pendants.

Some of the artefacts from these excavations were housed at the National Museum Cardiff and others at The Museum of Welsh Antiquities at Bangor University. They are now all in the collections of Oriel Môn.
