= Rupert Morris =

Rupert Hugh Morris (16 March 1843 – 2 January 1918) was a Welsh clergyman and antiquarian, who was principal of Carmarthen Training College from 1869 to 1876 and headmaster of Godolphin School from 1876 to 1884. He then spent ten years as chaplain to the Duke of Westminster, before his final position as vicar of a church in Pimlico.

== Life ==
Morris was born at Holywell, Flintshire, north Wales on 16 March 1843. His father was the printer and publisher William Morris. He was educated at Ruthin Grammar School and Jesus College, Oxford, obtaining a Bachelor of Arts degree in Literae Humaniores in 1865. He then taught at Rossall School until 1869, becoming ordained in 1867. In 1869, he was appointed principal of Carmarthen Training College, where he remained until 1876. He was also appointed a canon of St David's Cathedral in 1873. He moved in 1876 to become the headmaster of Godolphin School, in Hammersmith, London, leaving in 1884 to become chaplain and librarian to Hugh Grosvenor, 1st Duke of Westminster (the year in which he received the degree of Doctor of Divinity from the University of Oxford). During his ten years in the post, he wrote various works including Chester during the Plantagenet and Tudor Reigns (1894), and a history of the diocese of Chester in the following year. He then was appointed by the Duke as vicar of St Gabriel's, Pimlico. Whilst in Pimlico, he carried on with his writings, serving as editor of Archaeologia Cambrensis (the journal of the Cambrian Archaeological Association) between 1907 and 1918, and editing Edward Lhuyd's Parochialia. He died in Pimlico on 2 January 1918.
