= Cardale Babington =

English botanist and archaeologist (1808–1895)

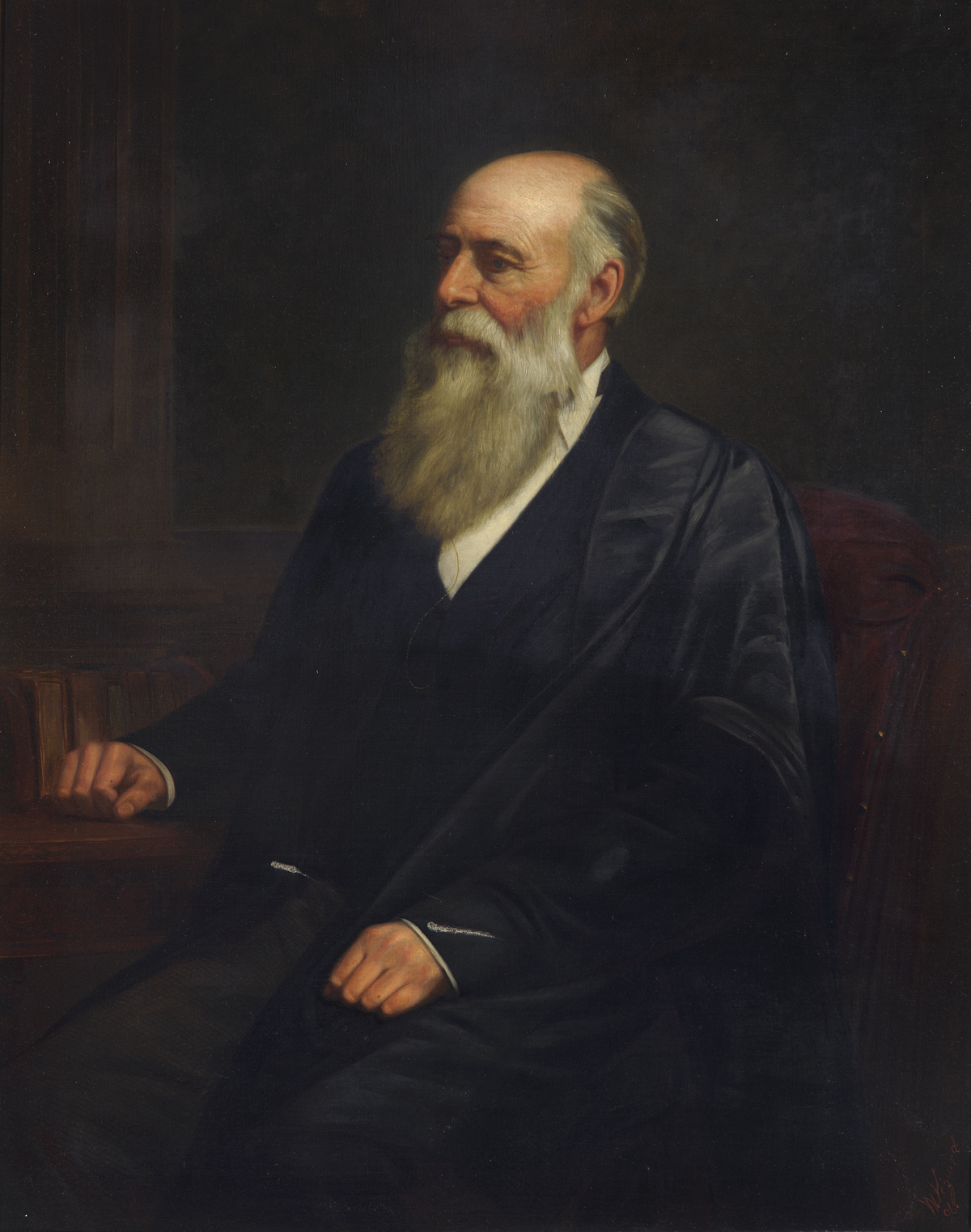
- Born: Charles Cardale Babington; 23 November 1808; Ludlow, Shropshire
- Died: 22 July 1895 (aged 86)
- Education: St John's College, Cambridge
- Known for: Manual of British Botany (1843)
- Spouse: Anna Maria Walker
- Relatives: Thomas Babington Macaulay (uncle); Churchill Babington (cousin)
- Scientific career
- Fields: Botanist and archaeologist
- Workplaces: Cambridge University
- Author abbrev. (botany): Bab.

Charles Cardale Babington (23 November 1808 – 22 July 1895) was an English botanist, entomologist, and archaeologist. He was elected a Fellow of the Royal Society in 1851. A contemporary of Charles Darwin, he was a student of John Stevens Henslow, active in botanical circles and succeeded Henslow as professor of botany at Cambridge. Apart from the Manual of British Botany which went into several editions, he published floras of Bath and Cambridgeshire; and a monograph on the genus Rubus. In his taxonomic approach, he was considered a splitter.

== Life and work ==
Babington was born in Ludlow, Shropshire, the son of physician Rev. Joseph Babington and Cathérine née Whitter, and a nephew of Thomas Babington Macaulay. When he was four, the family moved to Leicester. At eight he received private tuition at Needwood Parsonage, Staffordshire. He went briefly to Charterhouse followed by Hutchins's school at Bath. In 1826 he joined St John's College, Cambridge, obtaining his Bachelor of Arts in 1830 and his Master of Arts in 1833. He attended and took greater interest in the botanical lectures of John Stevens Henslow. In 1831 he was persuaded to examine the plants of Bath by Mr E. Collings and this resulted in his first work, Flora Bathonensis published in 1833. He overlapped at Cambridge with Charles Darwin, and in 1829 they argued over who should have the pick of beetle specimens from a local dealer. He gained the nickname "Beetles Babington" and helped Darwin identify specimens from the collections he made on the voyage of the Beagle. He became a member of a Phrenological Society at Cambridge that was created following a lecture by Johann Gaspar Spurzheim. He obtained the chair of botany at the University of Cambridge in 1861 and wrote several papers on insects. He married Anna Maria Walker (1836–1919), daughter of Madras civil servant John Walker, on 3 April 1866.

Babington was a member of several scientific societies including the Botanical Society of Edinburgh, the Linnean Society of London (1853), the Geological Society of London, the Royal Society (1851), and in 1833 he participated in the foundation of the Royal Entomological Society. Babington was President of the Cambrian Archaeological Association at their meeting at Church Stretton in 1881 and for many years served as chairman of the council of the association. In 1836 he was a founding member of the Ray Club which became the Ray Society in 1844. He was a founding member of the Cambridge Antiquarian Society in 1840. He was devoted to evangelical activities and supported organizations like the Church Missionary Society and helped set up a home for orphan girls in Cambridge in 1871.

He wrote Manual of British Botany (1843), Flora of Cambridgeshire (1860), The British Rubi (1869) and edited the publication Annals and Magazine of Natural History from 1842. His herbarium and library are conserved by the University of Cambridge.

The plant genus Babingtonia was named in his honour by John Lindley in 1842. A species of Rubus also bears his name Rubus babingtonii.

== Other sources ==
- Allen G. Debus (ed.) (1968). World Who’s Who in Science. A Biographical Dictionary of Notable Scientists from Antiquity to the Present. Marquis-Who's Who (Chicago) : xvi + 1855 p.
- Anthony Musgrave (1932). Bibliography of Australian Entomology, 1775-1930, with biographical notes on authors and collectors, Royal Zoological Society of News South Wales (Sydney) : viii + 380.
