= David Thomas (archdeacon of Montgomery) =

Welsh clergyman and historian

Archdeacon D R Thomas
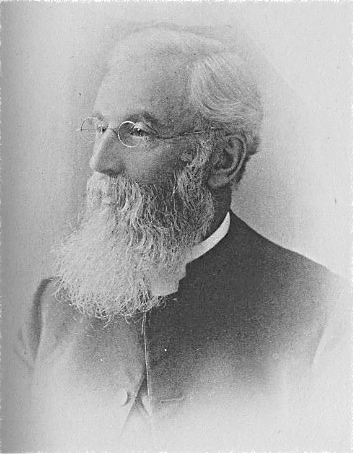
- Photolithograph of Archdeacon D R Thomas, 1897. From Archaeologia Cambrensis, 1897
- Born: 1833; Bodynfoel, Llanfechain, Montgomeryshire
- Died: 16 March 1916 (aged 82–83)
- Education: Ruthin School and Jesus College, Oxford
- Known for: Chairman of the Cambrian Archaeological Association, Editor of ‘‘Archaeologia Cambrensis’’ and author of the ”History of the Diocese of St Asaph”.
- Scientific career
- Fields: History of Wales
- Workplaces: Archdeacon of Montgomery

David Richard Thomas or Archdeacon D H Thomas (1833 – 11 October 1916) was a Welsh clergyman and historian. He was a canon of St Asaph's Cathedral and Archdeacon of Montgomery, as well as being a Fellow of the Society of Antiquaries of London. His major publication was the History of the Diocese of St Asaph, the first such history of a Welsh diocese.

== Life ==
Thomas was the son of Owen and Mary Thomas of Bodyfoel, Llanfechain in Montgomeryshire, and he was baptised on 14 September 1833. He was educated at Ruthin School under Edward Barnwell before matriculating at Jesus College, Oxford in 1852. His father died during his time at Oxford and Thomas taught during the university vacations to support himself. He graduated in 1856, but failed to obtain a college fellowship in 1859. After his ordination, he became curate of Rhuddlan in 1857, then curate from 1859 to 1864 of Selattyn in Shropshire (which was at the time part of the Diocese of St Asaph). He was then in 1864 appointed vicar of Cefn Meiriadog in Denbighshire, a post he held until 1877 when he became vicar of Meifod, Powys. He was appointed a canon of St Asaph in 1881 and archdeacon of Montgomery in 1886. In 1892, he left Meifod to become rector of Llandrinio, in Montgomeryshire, where he remained until his death on 11 October 1916.

== Work ==
In addition to his clerical duties, Thomas was an active historian and antiquarian. He was a stalwart member of the Cambrian Archaeological Association, who chaired its committee, served as editor of its journal for two periods (1875–1880 and 1884–1888), and wrote more than 25 articles for the journal. His major work, published between 1870 and 1874, was a History of the Diocese of St Asaph; it was enlarged and printed in three volumes between 1906 and 1913. It was the first such diocesan history in Wales. He also wrote a History of the Parish of Llandrinio (1895), The Life and Work of Bishop Richard Davies and William Salesbury (1902), four religious works, and other publications. He was elected a Fellow of the Society of Antiquaries of London.
