= Richard Avent =

British archaeologist (1948–2006)

- Born: 13 July 1948; Cookham, Berkshire
- Died: 2 August 2006 (aged 58); Gozo, Malta
- Spouse: Dr Sian Rees

Academic background
- Education: University College, Cardiff

Academic work
- Institutions: Cadw
- Notable works: Castles of the Princes of Gwynedd (1983)

Richard Avent (13 July 1948 – 2 August 2006) was a British archaeologist, conservationist and civil servant. He was a leading authority on the history of medieval Welsh castles, particularly those constructed by the native Welsh princes.

== Biography ==
Avent was the Chief Inspector of Ancient Monuments and Historic Builds at Cadw, the historic environment service of the Welsh Government, and briefly led Cadw in 2005. He was also president of the Cambrian Archaeological Association.

He was a pioneer of landscape archaeology in Wales, helping to create the four Welsh Archaeological Trusts. He promoted the study of native Welsh castles, largely overshadowed by the castles constructed by Edward I, and wrote Castles of the Princes of Gwynedd (1983). Avent also oversaw excavations and restoration work at Laugharne Castle.

Avent died in a diving accident in Gozo, Malta, in 2006.
