= Robin Grove-White =

Welsh environmentalist and academic (born 1941)

Robin Grove-White (born 1941) is an Anglo-Irish Welsh environmentalist, and academic, emeritus Professor of Environment and Society at Lancaster University. Grove-White Chairs the board of the Institute for Study of Welsh Estates (ISWE) at Bangor University. He is also involved in local organisations such as Menter Mechell and Cymdeithas Hanes Mechell and is president of the Anglesey Antiquarian Society. In 2018 he was awarded an honorary fellowship for Services to the Community at Bangor University

== Personal life ==
Grove-White was born in Dublin and raised on Anglesey, Wales, the son of William Grove-White, descended from the Bulkeley family of landowners and residing at Brynddu (rebuilt 1690) near Llanfechell. He attended Worcester College, Oxford.

Robin Grove-White is married to the artist Helen Grove-White (née Smith) and they have three children; Ruth, Simon and Francis. Robin Grove-White has another child, Will Grove-White, a member of George Hinchcliffe's Ukulele Orchestra of Great Britain, from his first marriage to the writer Virginia Ironside

== Career ==
From 1963 to 1968 he became a freelance scriptwriter, for the television series TW3 (That Was the Week that Was), a satirical programme hosted by David Frost and featuring Ned Sherrin, Willie Rushton and Lance Percival. Other work was in TV, radio, cabaret, film, and advertising in UK, US and Canada (including 'The Establishment' (London), 'The Frost programme' (ITV), 'Marty' (TV series), This Hour Has Seven Days (CBCTV), The Second City (Chicago), and McCann-Erickson (Toronto & London).

In his late 20s he returned to complete his degree at the University of Oxford in politics, economics and philosophy (Worcester College, Oxford 1971). This led him into rural protection and environmental campaigning with the Campaign for the Protection of Rural England (1972–1981, then Director, 1981–1987). He was chair of the Board of Greenpeace UK until 2004.

After a short spell at Imperial College he moved to Lancaster University in 1989 as a research fellow, eventually becoming Professor of Environment and Society. He established the Centre for the Study of Environmental Change (CSEC) in 1991, to focus on problems of contemporary environmental knowledge and policy development. The centre now resides in the Sociology Department but it was highly active in environmental research, achieving a 5* research rating in the 1990s, with funding from the Economic and Social Research Council (ESRC), the Health and Safety Executive, and the European Environment Agency. Other important members and collaborators included Prof. Brian Wynne, Prof. Elizabeth Shove, Simon Shackley, Bron Szerszynski, Prof. Claire Waterton and Prof. Phil Macnaghten. He was a member of the Government's Agriculture and Environment Biotechnology Commission.

Grove-White retired in 2006 and moved back to the family farm in Llanfechell, Anglesey, initiating several environmental improvements. He completed a PhD in history in 2011 at Bangor University, with a thesis entitled Welsh, English - or British? Hugh Hughes and late sixteenth-century Anglesey. This was later published by the Anglesey Antiquarian Society.

He served as High Sheriff of Anglesey and Gwynedd in 2011–12. In Llanfechell he helped initiate the community hub venture, Caffi Siop Mechell. He has also received an honorary doctorate from the University of Bath.

== Contributions ==
Grove-White's career is dedicated to the challenge of a viable future in the face of environmental and technological change. As an academic he strove to develop social science-based approaches to 'environmental' research, using 'sociology of knowledge' frameworks linking university centres with wider society. His main contributions there were to the public understanding of science, attitudes towards genetic engineering, local economic development, and spirituality and nature. He continues to agitate.

== Publications ==
- Deane-Drummond C., B Szerszynski and R. Grove-White (eds.). 2003. Reordering Nature: Theology, Society and the New Genetics. London: Bloomsbury.
- Waterton, C, B Wynne, R Grove-White and T Mansfield. 2001. Scientists Reflect on Science: Scientists' Perspectives on Contemporary Science and Environmental Policy. Lancaster: CSEC, Lancaster University.
- Grove-White R., P. Macnaghten and B. Wynne. 2000. Wising up : the public and new technologies.. Lancaster University: Centre for the Study of Environmental Change.
- Grove-White R., P. Macnaghten, C. Waterton & S. Weldon. 1998. Woodland Sensibilities: Recreational Uses of Woods and Forests in Britain. Edinburgh: CSEC & Forestry Commission.
- Grove-White R., P Macnaghten, S Mayer & B Wynne. 1997. Uncertain World: Genetically Modified Organisms, Food and Public Attitudes in Britain. London: CSEC & Unilever.
- Walsh, M, S. Shackley and R. Grove-White. 1996. Fields Apart? What Farmers Think of Nature Conservation in the Yorkshire Dales. Lancaster: CSEC, Lancaster University.
- Waterton, C., R. Grove-White, J. Rodwell and B. Wynne. 1995. Corine: databases and nature conservation: the new politics of information in the European Union. Lancaster: CSEC, Lancaster University.
- Grove-White, R., and B. Wynne. 1995. Science, Culture and the Environment (Research Report), Lancaster: CSEC, Lancaster University.
- Grove-White, R, H. Armstrong and J. Darrall. 1994. Building Lancaster's Future: Economic and Environmental Implications of Lancaster University's Expansion to 2001. Lancaster: CSEC, Lancaster University.
- Grove-White, R, J. Darrall, P Macnaghten, G Clark and J Urry. 1994. Leisure Landscapes (main report), Lancaster: CSEC, Lancaster University.
- Grove-White, R., A. Phillips and M.D. Toogood. 1993. Sustainability and the English Countryside (Report to the Countryside Commission). Lancaster: CSEC, Lancaster University.
- Wynne, B., C. Waterton and R. Grove-White. 1993 (reissued 2007). Public Perceptions and the Nuclear Industry in West Cumbria. Lancaster: CSEC, Lancaster University.
- Grove-White, R. 1991. The UK's Environmental Movement and UK Political Culture (Report to EURES-Institut fur Regionale Studien Europa). Lancaster: CSEC, Lancaster University.
- Grove-White, R, P. Morris and B. Szerszynski. 1991. The Emerging Ethical Mood of Environmental Issues in Britain (Report to World Wildlife Fund UK), Lancaster: CSEC, Lancaster University.
- Grove-White, R. 2020. A Prism for his times: Late-Tudor Anglesey & Hugh Hughes of Plas Coch. Llangefni: Anglesey Antiquarian Society.
