= Frances Lynch =

Welsh archaeologist

Frances Lynch (also Frances Lynch-Llewellyn) is a Welsh archaeologist. She is an Honorary Research Fellow in the Department of History, Welsh History and Archaeology at Bangor University and the author of several volumes on the archaeology and prehistory of Wales.

== Work ==
Lynch's books include research on prehistoric Anglesey and the ancient monuments of Gwynedd. She is considered a leading expert on Neolithic Wales.

Lynch was elected a Fellow of the Society of Antiquaries of London in 1970, and in 2016 was awarded an MBE for her work archaeology and heritage. In 2012 the Cambrian Archaeological Association published a festchrift dedicated to Lynch. Lynch was the chair of the committee of the Anglesey Antiquarian Society from 2012 to 2025.

== Selected publications ==
- Lynch, Frances (1991). Prehistoric Anglesey: The Archaeology of the Island to the Roman Conquest (2nd ed.). Anglesey Antiquarian Society. ISBN 0-9500199-7-6. (First edition 1970.)
- Lynch, Frances; Sharp, Mick; Williamson, Jean (2009). Anglesey: Past Landscapes of the Coast. Windgather Press. ISBN 978-1-905119-29-5.
  - Welsh-language edition: Lynch, Frances; Sharp, Mick; Williamson, Jean (2009). Môn: Tirluniau'r Arfordir Gynt. Windgather Press. ISBN 978-1-905119-30-1.
- Lynch, Frances (1997). Megalithic Tombs and Long Barrows in Britain. Shire Archaeology. Shire Publications. ISBN 978-0-7478-0341-6.
