= Bryan O'Neil =

Chief Inspector of Ancient Monuments

Bryan Hugh St. John O'Neil
- Born: 7 August 1905; London
- Died: 24 October 1954 (aged 49); Edinburgh
- Education: St. John's College, Oxford
- Spouse: Helen O'Neil (née Donovan) (m. 1939)
- Scientific career
- Fields: Archaeology; Medieval architecture, History of early Artillery
- Workplaces: Inspector of Ancient Monuments for Wales and Chief Inspector of Ancient Monuments.

Bryan Hugh St. John O'Neil (7 August 1905 – 24 October 1954) was a British archaeologist who became Chief Inspector of Ancient Monuments for England and Wales.

Bryan O'Neil was born in London. His father was Charles Valentine O'Neil, and his mother was Mabel Meliora (nee Rowe) He was educated at Merchant Taylor's School, at that time in London, and St John's College, Oxford. He obtained his degree in classics in 1928. He was a member of the Oxford University Archaeological Society, becoming its president in 1926. In 1939 he married Helen Donovan of Bourton-on-the-Water, daughter of Charles Donovan MD, who was noted for her work on Gloucestershire archaeology.

In 1930 O'Neil was appointed to the Office of Works, later the Ministry of Works as an Assistant Inspector of Ancient Monuments, with responsibilities in Wales. He became Inspector for Wales in 1934, and Chief Inspector for England and Wales in 1945. As Inspector, he was responsible both for the care and protection of ancient monuments in the guardianship of the state, and for scheduling of monuments in private hands that were worthy of protection. During the war, he remained in London, and was much involved with the archaeological consequences of war damage and the organisation of rescue excavations. As Chief Inspector he was involved with the drafting of the 1953 Historic Buildings Act and the setting up Historic Building Councils.

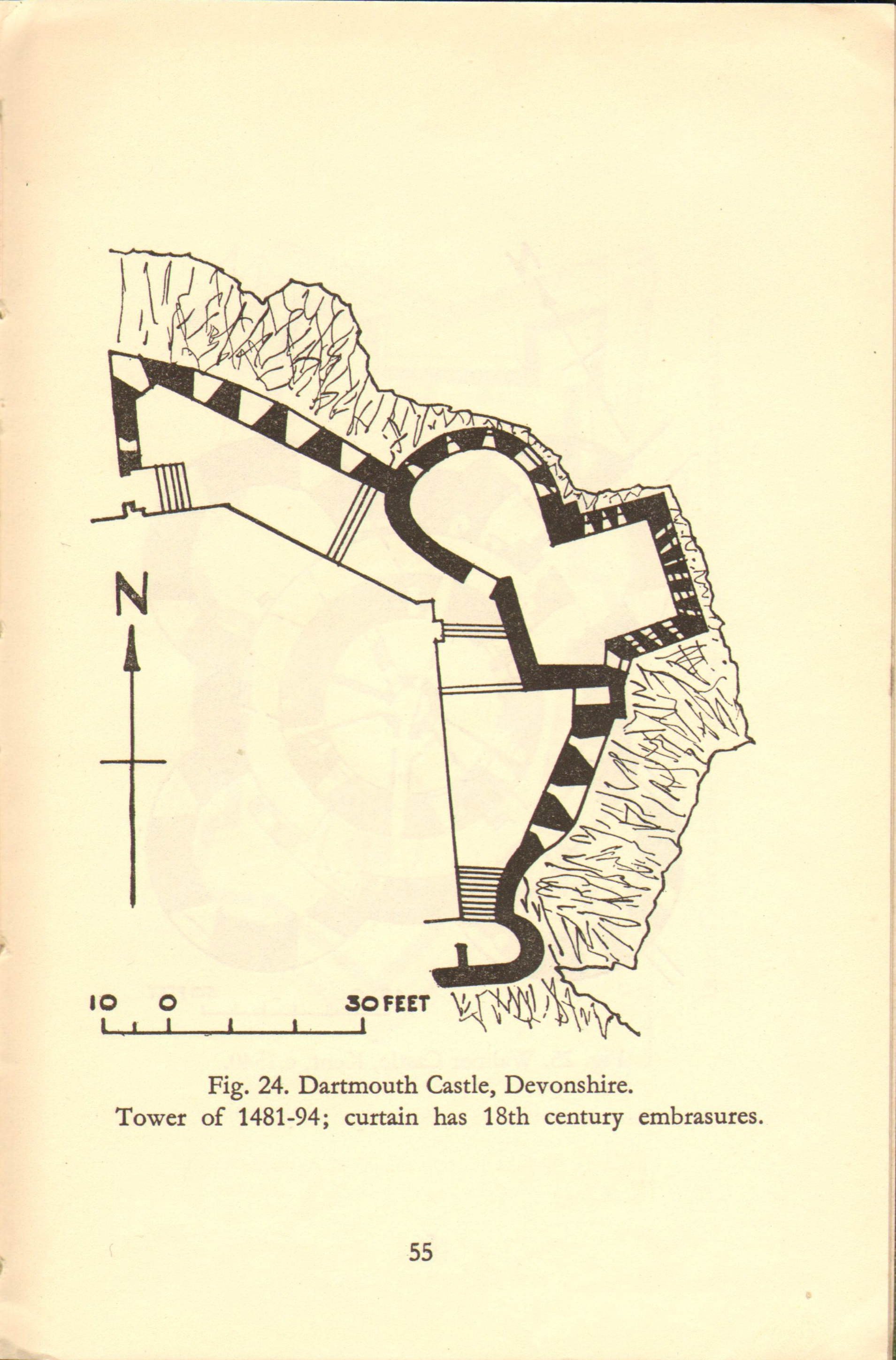
Plan of Dartmouth Castle, Devon

O'Neil was extremely active in field archaeology, publishing over 200 papers. He was noted for his expertise in the analysis of structural sequences, evident both in his work on iron-age sites in the Welsh borderland, for example Titterstone Clee Hill Fort, Breidden Hill Fort, and the Ffridd Faldwyn Camp, as well as in his work on later mediaeval stone castles, such as Dartmouth and Rushen. At Dartmouth, the ‘Guntower’ building of 1481-1494 is the earliest surviving English coastal fortress specifically built to carry guns. His interest in early artillery fortification developed, and he became a leading expert in this field. He published a study of the work of Stefan von Haschenperg, an engineer to King Henry VIII, and his book Castles and Cannon; A study of Early Artillery Fortifications in England, has become a standard work. This was published in 1960, six years after his premature death at the age of 49. Other important archaeological investigations included studies of the town layout of Llanidloes, the castle site at Castle Caereinion, and the excavations and survey of the Montgomery Town Wall. He also worked on the fortifications at Rhodes.

O'Neil wrote a series of official guide-books to ancient monuments, mostly of castles, published by H.M. Stationery Office, including:

- Dartmouth Castle (1934)
- Criccieth Castle (1934)
- Peveril Castle (1934)
- Clifford's Tower, York Castle (1936)
- Talley Abbey, Carmarthenshire (1938)
- Castle Rushen, Isle of Man (1947)
- Scalloway Castle, Shetland (1949)
- Ancient monuments of the Isles of Scilly (1949)
- Walmer Castle (1949)
- Audley End, Essex (1955)
- The Brochs of Mousa and Clickhimin (1950)
- Castle Cornet, Guernsey (1950)
- Caerlaverock Castle (1952)
- Deal Castle (1966)

and also some more general introductions:

- Regional Guide to ancient monuments in North Wales (1939)
- The History of Britain in Stone (1950)
- Castles: An Introduction to the Castles of England and Wales (1954)

O'Neil was interested in coins, becoming a Fellow of the Royal Numismatic Society. He catalogued the finds from a number of excavations, particularly of Roman coins. These included the Terling Treasure, consisting of Roman gold and silver coins and rings discovered at Terling Place, Essex, and the Sproxton hoard of silver Roman coins from Sproxton, Leicestershire. Both of these collections had been discovered over a hundred years earlier. O'Neil was a member of the Cambrian Archaeological Association from 1931, later serving on its general committee. He was secretary and editor of the Congress of Archaeological Societies, predecessor of the Council for British Archaeology and from 1935 a Fellow of the Society of Antiquaries of London of which he became Vice-President from 1947-1950.
