= Archaeologia Cambrensis =

Historical scholarly journal (1846–)

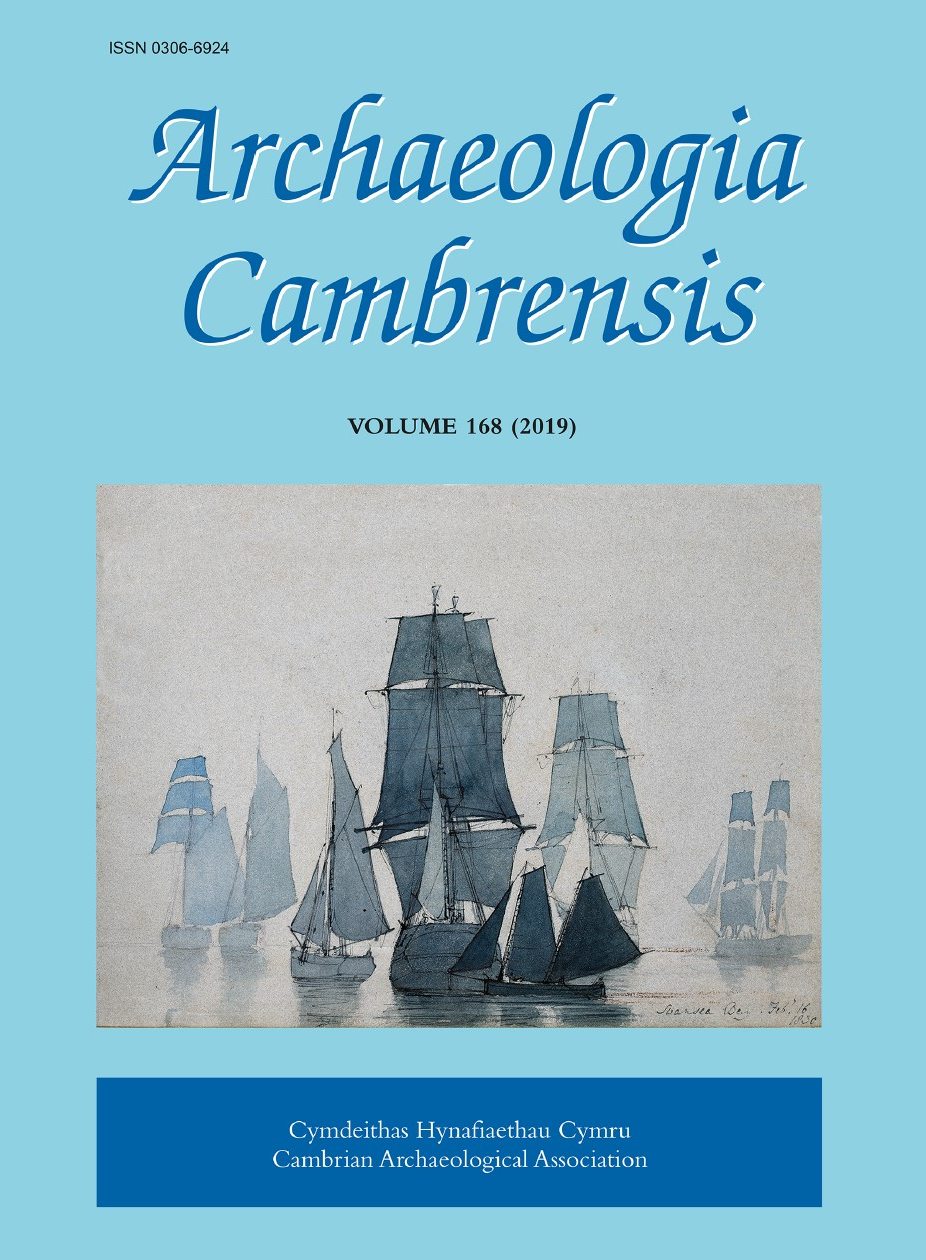
- Motto: CYMRU VU CYMRU VYDD (Wales Past, Wales Future)
- Discipline: Archaeology
- Language: English, Welsh
- Edited by: William J. Britnell

Publication details
- History: 1846–present
- Publisher: Cambrian Archaeological Association (Wales)
- Frequency: Annual

Standard abbreviations
- ISO 4: Archaeol. Cambrensis

Indexing
- ISSN: 0306-6924

Links
- Journal homepage

Archaeologia Cambrensis is a Welsh archaeological and historical scholarly journal published annually by the Cambrian Archaeological Association. (Note: Except for the first volume of the journal which was published in January 1846 whereas the Association was formed late in the same year. "It was the journal which gave birth to the Association, and not vice versa.") It contains historical essays, excavation reports, and book reviews, as well as society notes and accounts of field visits. The journal has included "much valuable material on the manuscripts, genealogy, heraldry, toponymy, folklore and literature of Wales".

== Scope ==
"The journal covers a broad range of multi-disciplinary topics relating to the archaeology and history of Wales and the Marches." Article topics range from the earliest prehistoric discoveries to the industrial archaeology and landscape history of the 19th and 20th centuries. Occasionally, and particularly in the earlier years, articles have been published on the archaeology of other Celtic lands (Brittany, Cornwall, the Isle of Man, Scotland and Ireland). In the 19th century, articles tended to concentrate on prehistoric monuments (particularly cromlechs, chambered tombs and hill-forts), Roman sites, inscribed stones and other discoveries of the Early Middle Ages, and the architecture of medieval Wales, especially of churches, castles, and monasteries. The range of opinion presented in the 19th century volumes also serves as a source of evidence for historians of the period.

As the 20th century progressed, and into the 21st century, the journal has carried longer articles on excavations and field surveys in Wales. Many of these articles have been grant-aided by Cadw. The journal has also carried more synoptic articles treating particular topics in greater depth; for example, the 2005 themed issue largely devoted to the Cistercians. Domestic architecture figures prominently, ranging from stately homes to the vernacular architecture of the Welsh countryside, as does the landscape of parks and gardens. The evolution of towns and the development of urban archaeology in Wales are also covered.

== Publication history ==
The journal has been published in multiple series with inconsistent volume numbering. Many volumes have been digitized by the Welsh Journals Online project at the National Library of Wales. Indexes of the journal for 1846–1900, 1901–1960, 1961–1980, and 1981–2000 have also been published. Later volumes each contain their own index.

== Abstracting and indexing ==
The journal is indexed in IBZ Online, Periodicals Index Online, L'Année philologique, International Bibliography of Art, and Archaeology Data Service.

== Editors ==
- Harry Longueville Jones and John Williams (Ab Ithel) (joint secretaries, 1846–9)
- Basil Jones and John Williams (Ab Ithel) (joint secretaries, 1849–53)
- Basil Jones and (probably) E. L. Barnwell (1854–5)
- Harry Longueville Jones (1855–70)
- Daniel Silvan Evans (1871–5)
- D. R. Thomas (1876–8)
- R. Trevor Owen, (1878–91)
- D. R. Thomas (joint editor, 1884–7)
- J. Romilly Allen (1887–1907)
- Rupert Morris (1908–17)
- J. Fisher (1917–25)
- H. Harold Hughes and Ellis Davies (1926–39)
- Ellis Davies (1940–8)
- Sir Cyril Fox (1949)
- V. E. Nash-Williams (1950–5)
- J. D. K. Lloyd (1956–69)
- W. Gwyn Thomas (1969–89)
- Trefor M. Owen (1990–2)
- Nancy M. Edwards (1991–3)
- Patricia Moore (1993–9)
- Donald Moore (2000)
- William J. Britnell (2001–)

(Dates are volume years. Sources: ADS, NLW, Archaeol. Cambrensis Indexes)

== Images ==
Archaeologia Cambrensis (19th century)

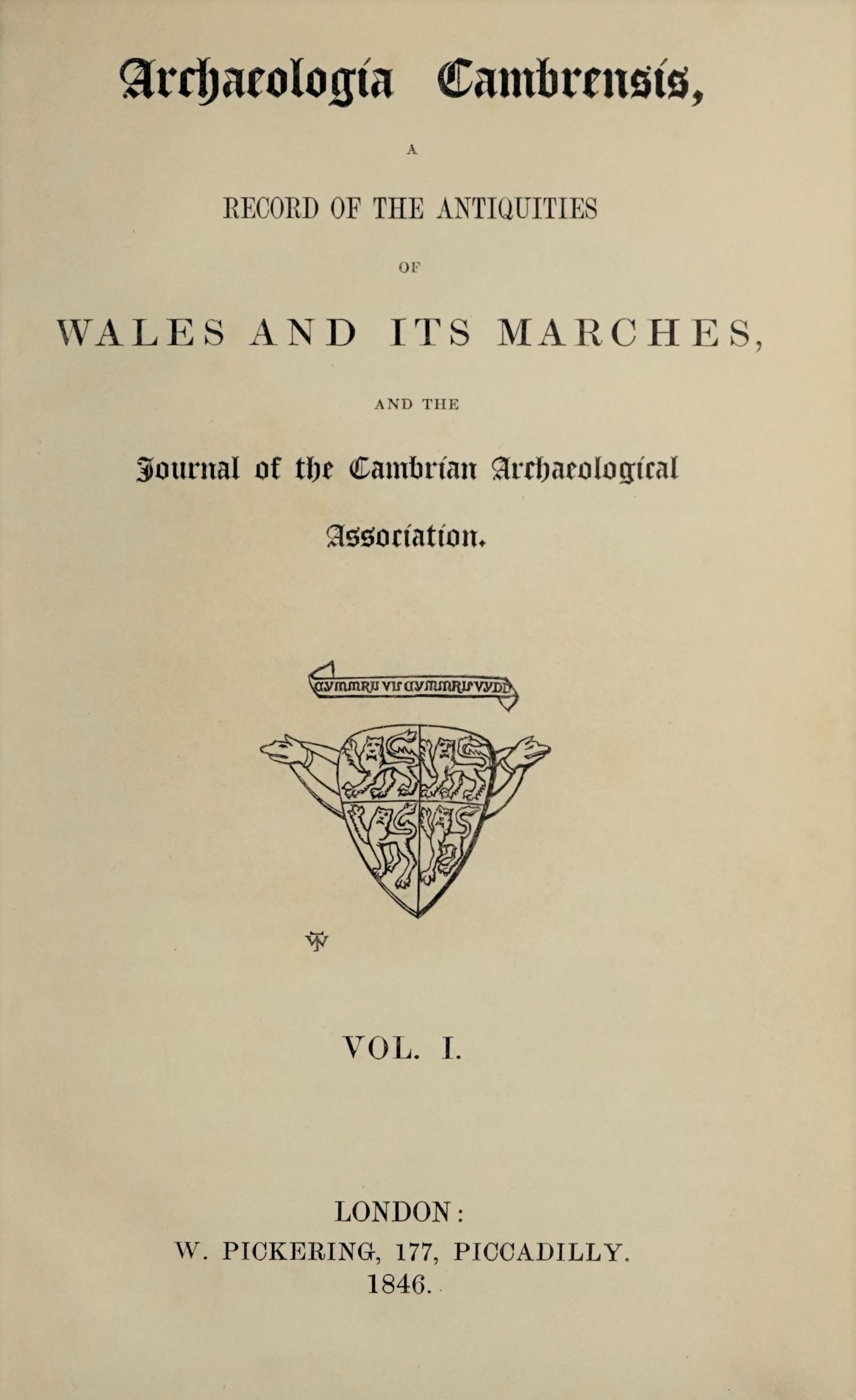
Archaeologia Cambrensis Vol. I (1846) cover page

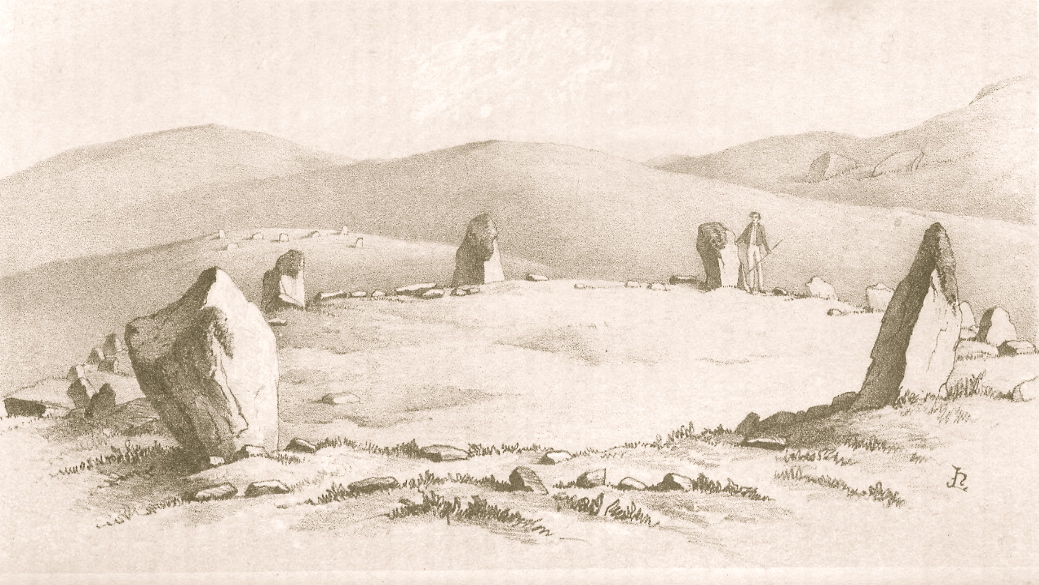
Dwygyfylchi Stone Circle, Conway (1846, p. 70)

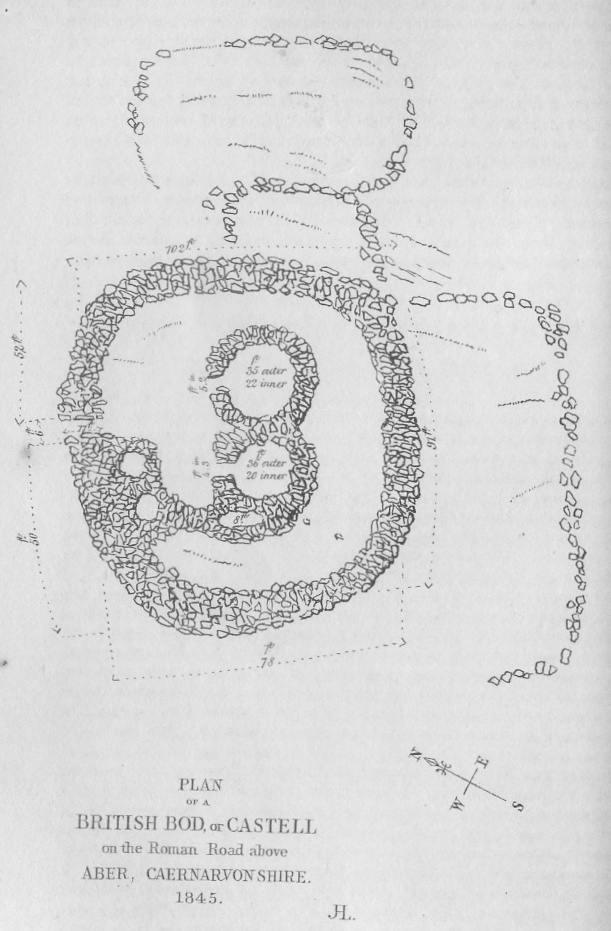
Hut Circles, Aber, Conway (1846, p. 74)

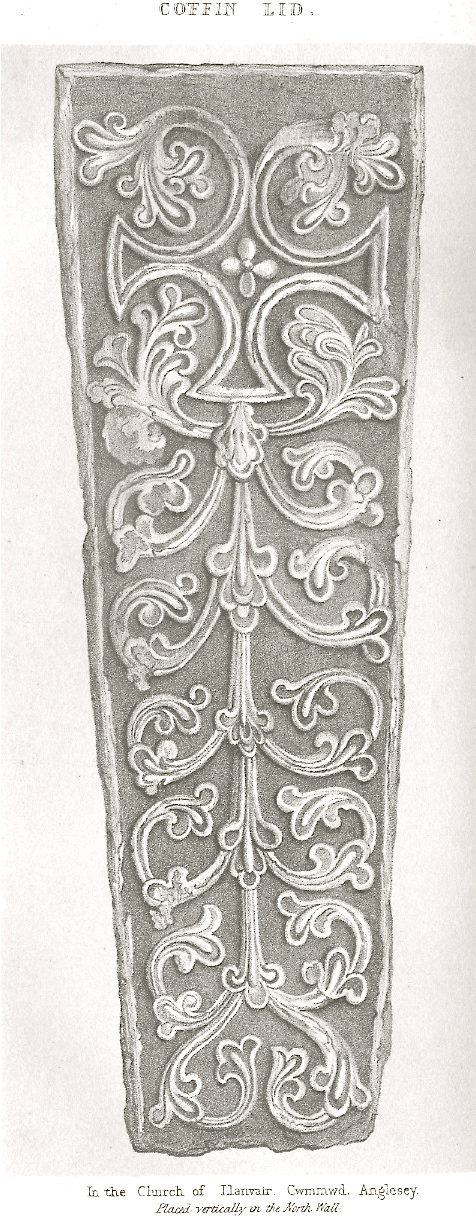
Coffin lid, Llanfair-yn-y-Cwmwd, Anglesey (1846 p. 394)

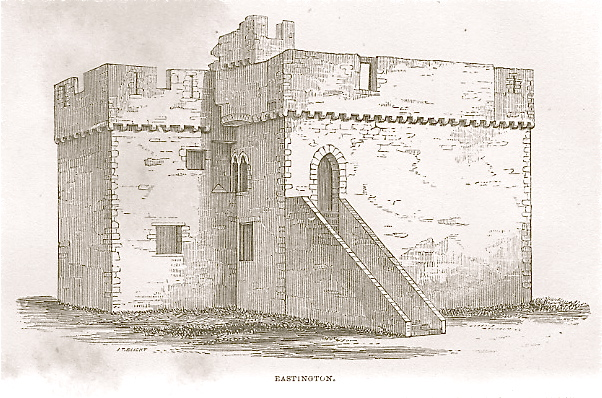
Eastington, Pembrokeshire (1867)

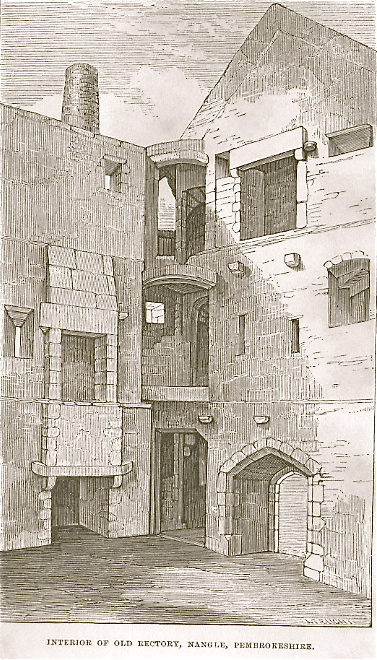
The Old Rectory, "Nangle", Pembrokeshire (1867)

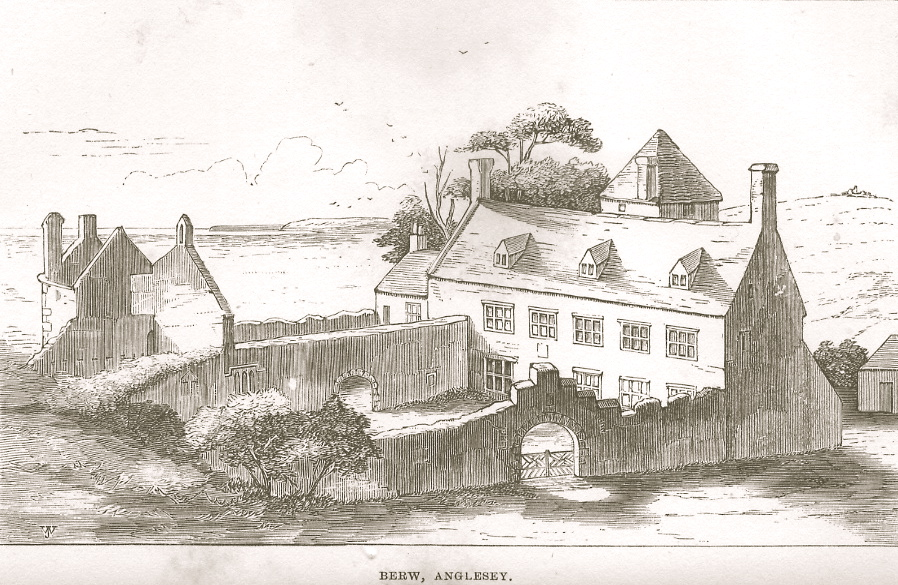
Plas Berw, Anglesey (1868, p. 96)

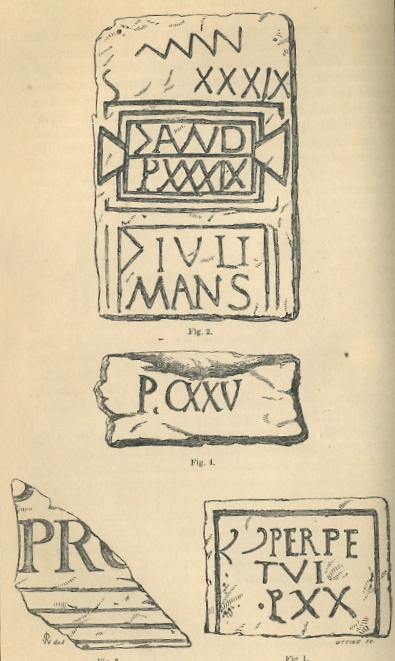
Park Cwm Chambered Tomb, Gower Peninsula (1871, p. 168)

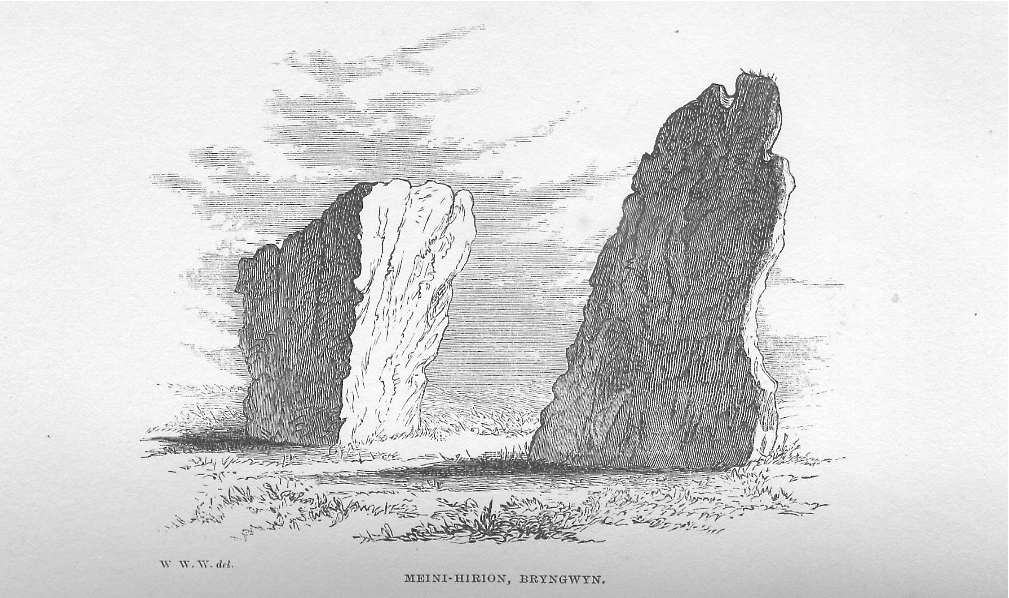
Meini Hirion, Bryn Gwyn stones, Anglesey (1872, p. 34c)

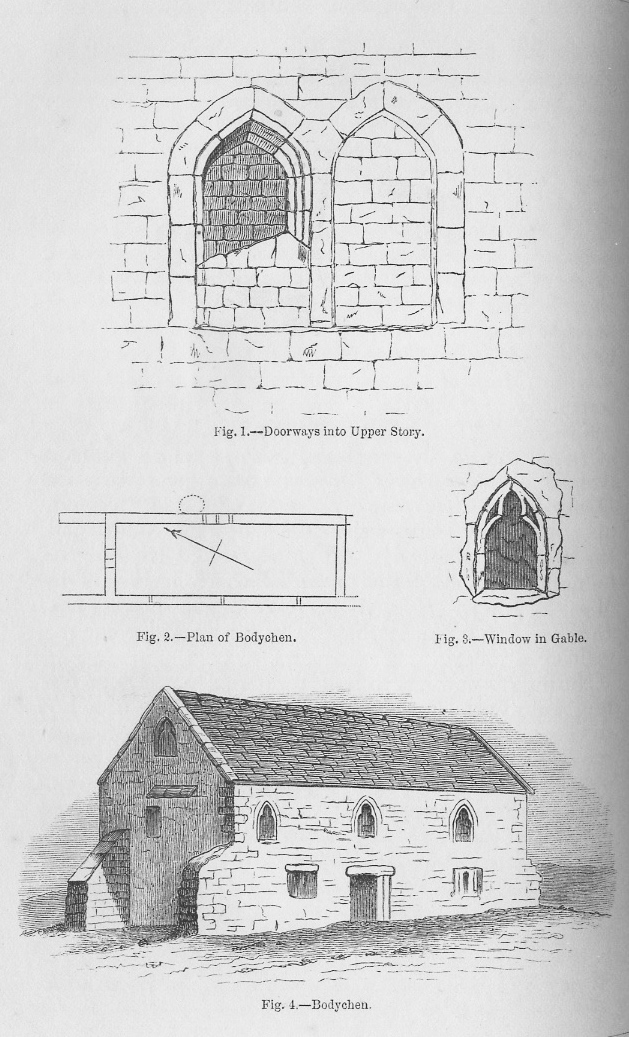
Bodychen Llandrygarn (1872 p. 238)

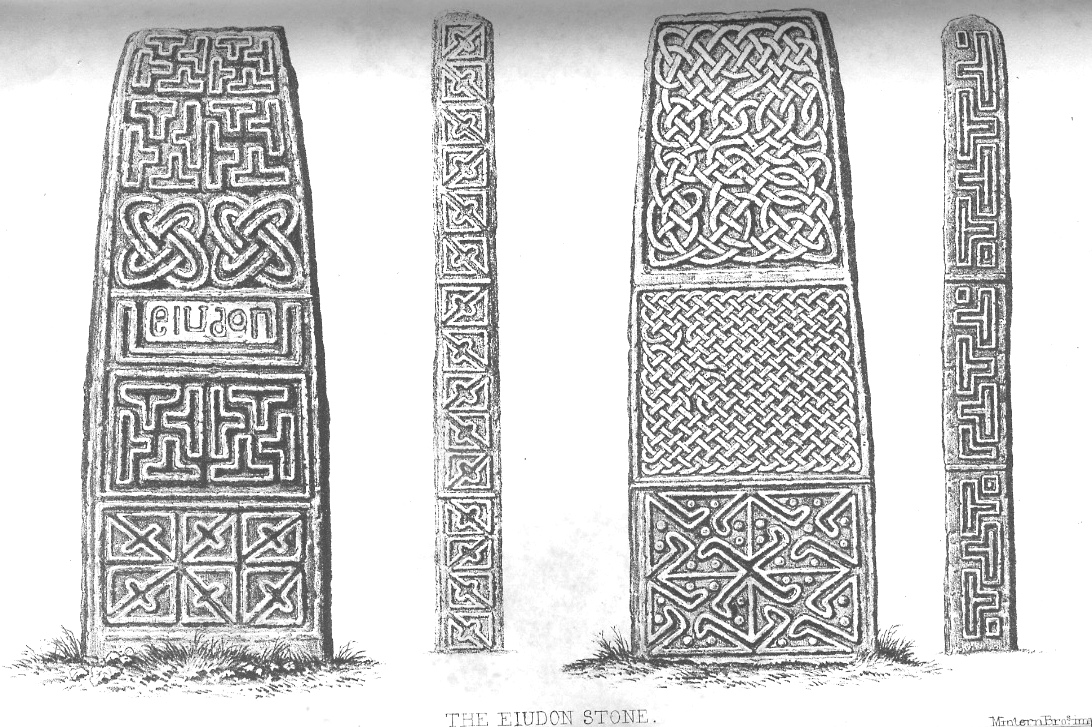
Eiudon Stone, Glansanan, Llanfynydd, Llandeilo (1872, p. 343)

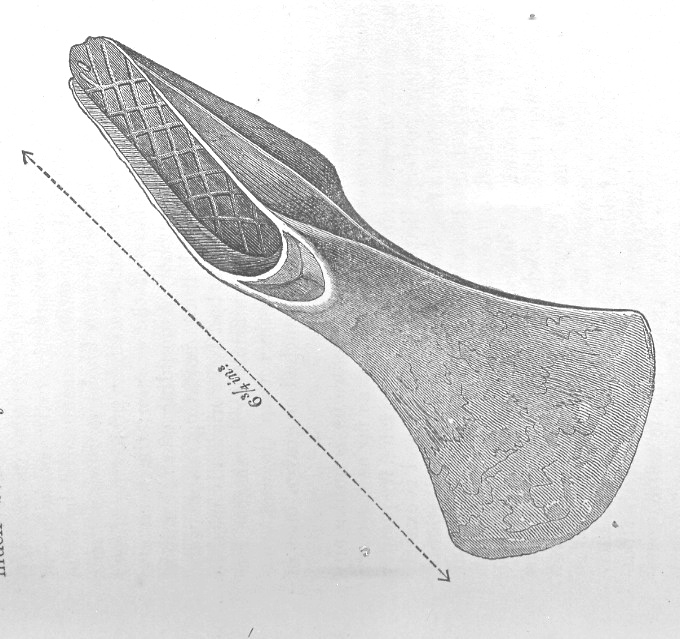
Palstave, Monachty Gwynn, Aberdovy (1872)

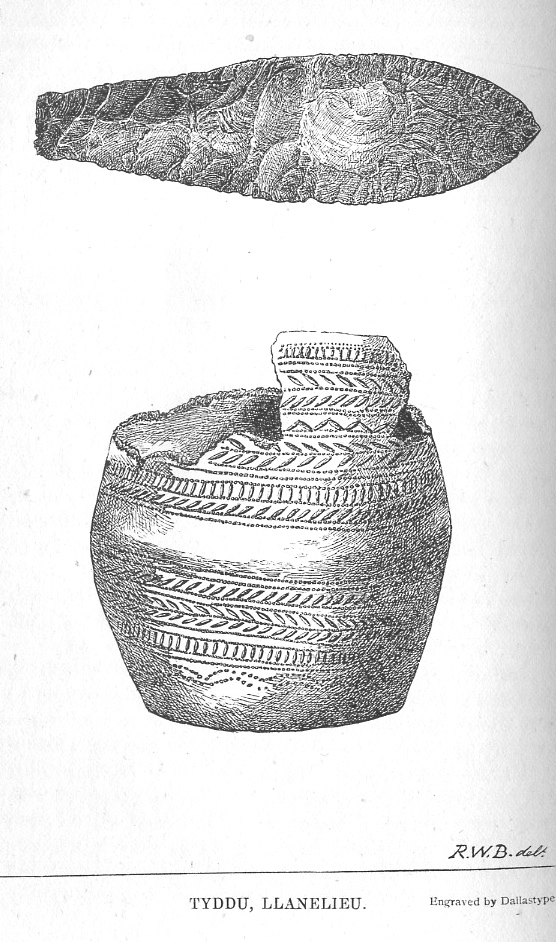
Beaker and flint dagger from Tyddu, Llanelieu, Breconshire (1872)

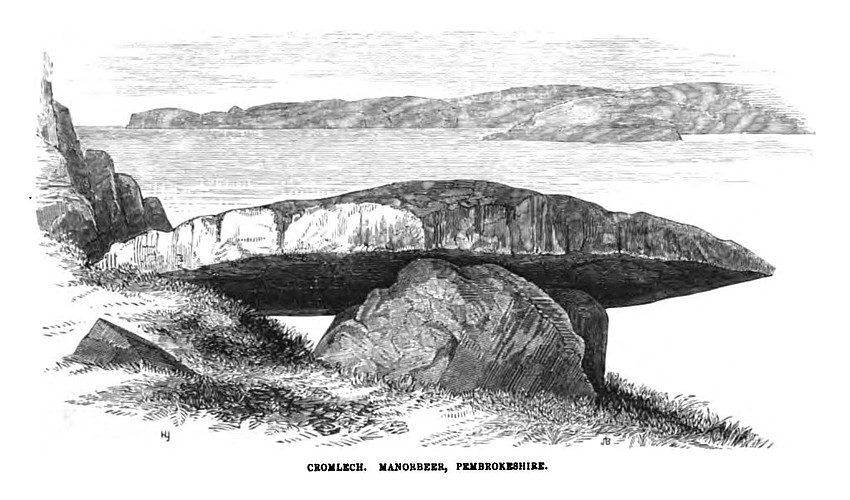
Cromlech, "Manorbeer", Pembrokeshire (King's Quoit)
