= Henry Harold Hughes =

English-born architect (1864–1940)

Harold Hughes
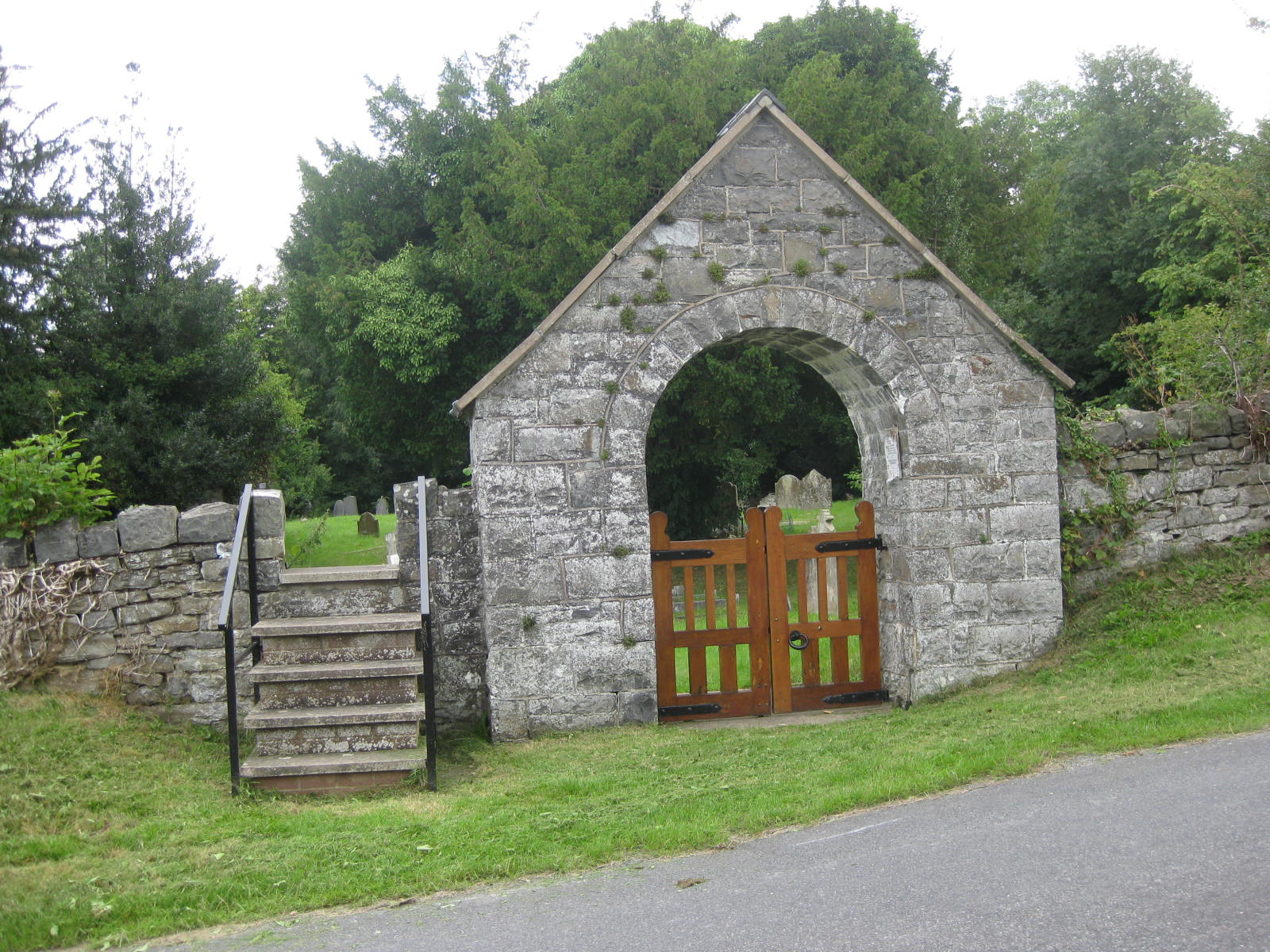
- Lych Gate, St Tysul's Old Churchyard, by Harold Hughes (1907)
- Born: 20 January 1864; Liverpool
- Died: 8 January 1940 (aged 75–76); Bangor, Gwynedd
- Education: Liverpool College; pupil of Arthur Baker
- Occupation: Architect

Harold Hughes or Henry Harold Hughes (20 January 1864 – 7 January 1940) was born in Liverpool and trained as an architect under Arthur Baker in London. He qualified as an ARIBA in 1890 and set up an architectural practice in Bangor in 1892, where he remained until his death on 7 January 1940.

== Career ==
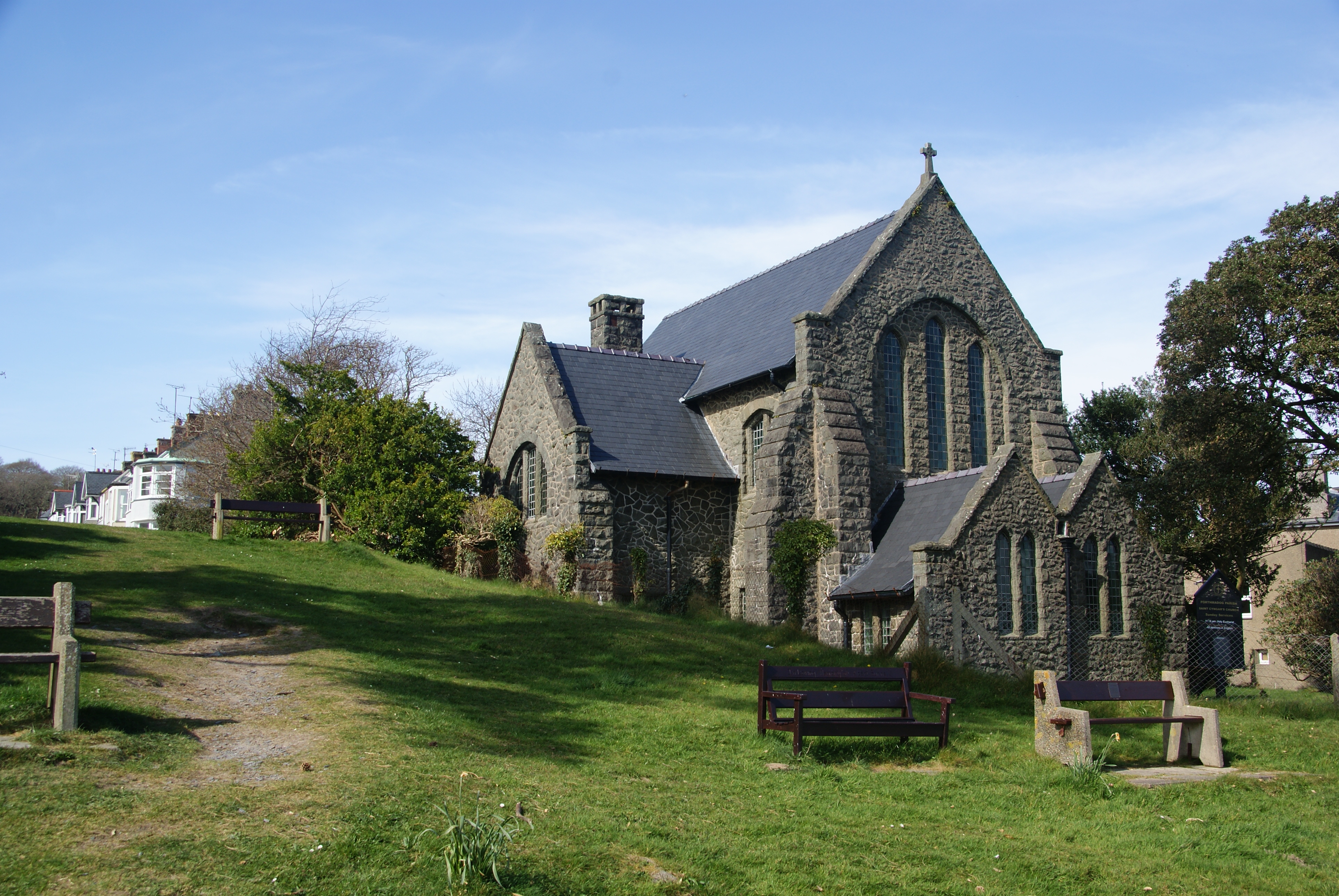
St Cyngar's Church, Borth-y-Gest, by Harold Hughes 1913.

Hughes was educated at Liverpool College. Hughes was appointed diocesan surveyor and architect in 1900 and restored many churches in the Diocese of Bangor. In 1919 he formed a partnership with W. G. Williams, who continued the practice after his death in 1940. Hughes was mainly occupied in the restoration of churches. He was a member of the SPAB and only undertook the minimal amount of restoration work. wherever possible. Hughes only appears to have been the architect for one new church, St Cyngar, Borth-y-gest, Porthmadog. His co-operation with the leading Arts and Crafts architect Herbert Luck North in the production of two books, The Old Churches of Snowdonia (1924) and The Old Cottages of Snowdonia (1908/1924) did much to increase public interest in the vernacular architecture of Snowdonia. He also contributed numerous articles to Archaeologia Cambrensis on architectural subjects.

He was interested in archaeology and he joined the Cambrian Archaeological Association in 1892. He was an editor of Archaeologia Cambrensis from 1926 to 1940. He became president of the Cambrian Archaeological Association] in 1930. From its foundation, he was a member of the Council of the National Museum of Wales and of the Commission on Ancient Monuments of Wales from 1935 onwards.

He served as the second President of the North Wales Society of Architects between 1932 and 1933. Herbert Luck North would later serve as the Society's fifth President between 1938 and 1939.

== Architectural work, restoration of churches ==
- St Cwyfan's Church, Llangwyfan, 1891–1893
- St James Church, Bangor, vestry, 1894
- St Mary's Church, Bryncroes
- St Beuno's Church, Clynnog Fawr
- St Rhychwyn's Church, Llanrhychwyn
- St Celynnin's Church, Llangelynnin
- St Tydecho's Church, Mallwyd
- Llaneilian
- St Padarn's Church, Llanberis (enlargement in 1914)

== Publications (with Herbert Luck North) ==
- The Old Churches of Snowdonia (1924)
- The Old Cottages of Snowdonia (1908/1924)

=== Articles in Archaeologia Cambrensis ===
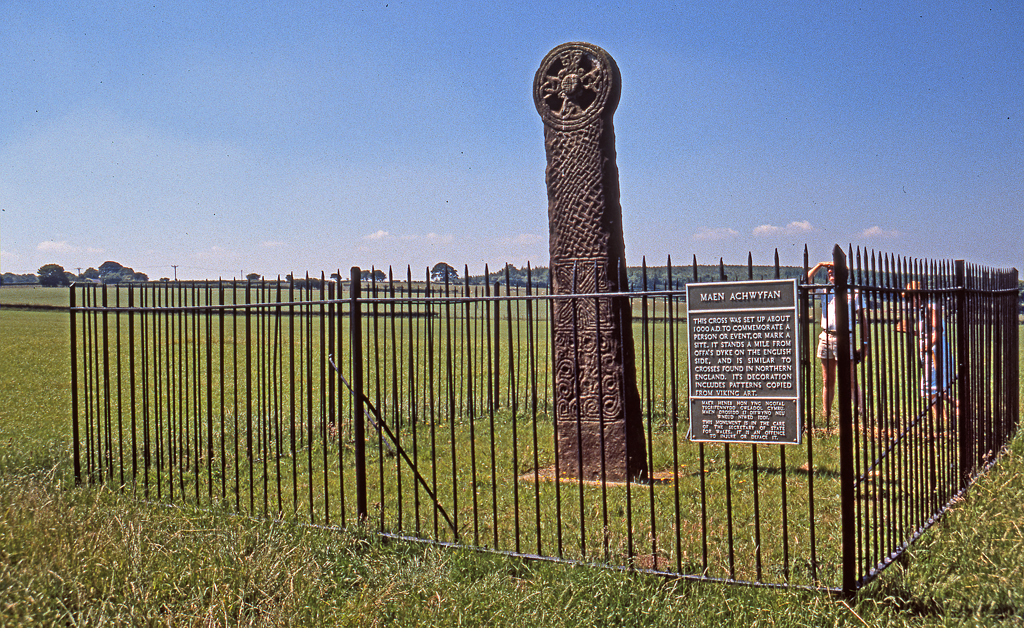
Maen Achwyfan, Whitford, Flintshire

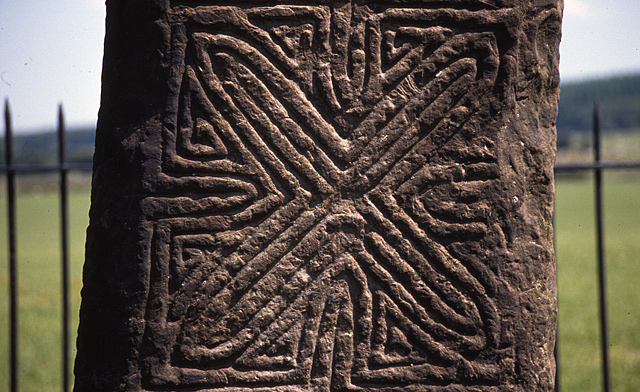
Carvings on Maen Achwyfan

- 1896 – Cochwillan
- 1898 – Old Houses in Llansilin
- 1901 – Ynys Seiriol (Puffin Island)
- 1904 – Survey of Treceiri.
- 1905 – Criccieth Castle
- 1906 – Surveys of Penygaer and Pen-y-corddyn
- 1908 – Merddyn Gwyn Barrow.
- 1913 – Harlech Castle
- 1922 – Prehistoric remains, Penmaenmawr
- 1922 – Early Christian Art in Anglesey
- 1924 – Berain
- 1925 – Pre-Norman Cross in Diserth Church.
- 1926 – Carving on Maen Achwyfan.
- 1926 – The lead coffin at Rhyddgaer.
- 1930 – The Ancient Churches of Anglesey.
- 1932 – Llanerfyl Reliquary and Reredos.
- 1938 – The Edwardian Castle and Town Defences of Conway.

== Obituaries ==
- Archaeologia Cambrensis (1940), Vol. 95, pp. 85–7.
- Antiquaries Journal (1940), Vol. 20, p. 425.

== Literature ==
- Antonia Brodie (ed.) (2001) Directory of British Architects, 1834–1914: Vol. 1 (A-K), 972–3, British Architectural Library, Royal Institute of British Architects, London.
- Haslam R., Orbach J. and Voelcker A. (2009), The Buildings of Wales: Gwynedd, Yale University Press, London.
- Voelcker A. (2011), Herbert Luck North: Arts and Crafts architecture for Wales, RCAHMW. ISBN 978-1-871184-41-9.
