= Eurwyn Wiliam =

Welsh Curator and Author

Eurwyn Wiliam FSA
- Education: University of Wales (MA PhD)
- Occupations: Curator; Author
- Title: Chairman; Royal Commission on the Ancient and Historical Monuments of Wales
- Term: 2009–19
- Predecessor: Ralph A. Griffiths
- Successor: Nancy Edwards

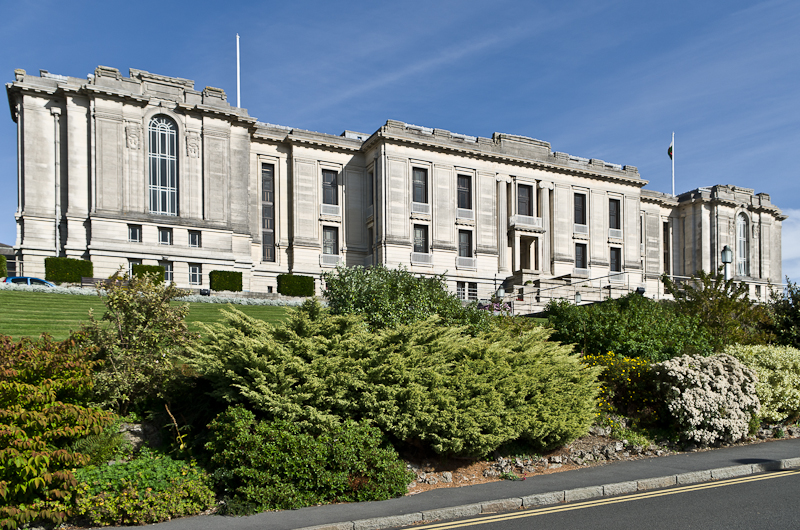
Royal Commission on the Ancient and Historical Monuments of Wales at The National Library of Wales

Eurwyn Wiliam FSA (Welsh: [ˈɛiruːɪn]; /ˈɛərwɪn/ AYR-win) is a Welsh curator and author who was Chairman of the Royal Commission on the Ancient and Historical Monuments of Wales (2009–19) and Assistant Keeper of the National Museum Wales.

== Career ==
A native of the Lleyn Peninsula, Wiliam studied for the postgraduate degrees of Master of Arts (MA) and Doctor of Philosophy (PhD) at the University of Wales. He was Assistant Keeper and later Director of Collections and Research and Deputy Director-General of the National Museum Wales.

Wiliam was appointed as a commissioner of the Royal Commission on the Ancient and Historical Monuments of Wales in 1992 and later succeeded Ralph A. Griffiths as chair in 2009 retiring in 2019. He was involved in establishing the register to protect Welsh placenames.

He is also chair of the Nantgarw China Works (Pottery) Trust. He has also been Chairman of the University of Wales Alumni Association. He was elected President of the Cambrian Archaeological Association in 2021.

An authority on the buildings of Wales and Welsh vernacular architecture, he has published several books on the subject.

Wiliam was elected a Fellow of the Society of Antiquaries in 1988.

== Select Bibliography ==
- Jenkins, J. Geraint (1973). The Rhaeadr Tannery. [Cardiff]: Welsh Folk Museum. ISBN 0-85485-025-2. OCLC 1095424.
- Wiliam, Eurwyn (1982). Traditional Farm Buildings in North-East Wales, 1550-1900 (1st ed.). [Cardiff]: National Museum of Wales, Welsh Folk Museum. ISBN 0-85485-049-X. OCLC 10923674.
- Wiliam, Eurwyn (1986). The Historical Farm Buildings of Wales. Edinburgh: J. Donald Publishers. ISBN 0-85976-136-3. OCLC 17548247.
- Wiliam, Eurwyn (1988). Amgueddfa Werin Cymru. Welsh Folk Museum. [Y Bont-faen]: D. Brown. ISBN 0-905928-87-3. OCLC 18739406.
- Wiliam, Eurwyn (1988). Home-Made Homes: Dwellings of the Rural Poor in Wales. Cardiff: Amgueddfa Genedlaethol Cymru. ISBN 0-7200-0320-2. OCLC 18949359.
- Wiliam, Eurwyn (1991). The Welsh Folk Museum: Visitor Guide. National Museum of Wales, Welsh Folk Museum. Cardiff: National Museum of Wales. ISBN 0-7200-0348-2. OCLC 24742194.
- Wiliam, Eurwyn (1991). Amgueddfa Werin Cymru: Llawlyfr Ymwelwyr. Anne Elizabeth Williams, National Museum of Wales, Welsh Folk Museum. Caerdydd: Amgueddfa Genedlaethol Cymru. ISBN 0-7200-0349-0. OCLC 24742932.
- Wiliam, Eurwyn (1992). Hen Adeiladau fferm. Capel Garmon: Gwasg Carreg Gwalch. ISBN 0-86381-200-7. OCLC 26543333.
- Wiliam, Eurwyn (1992). Welsh Long-Houses: Four Centuries of Farming at Cilewent. Cardiff: University of Wales Press. ISBN 0-7083-1164-4. OCLC 26722428.
- Wiliam, Eurwyn (2003). Rhyd-y-Car: A Welsh Mining Community: The Life, Death and Re-creation of a Welsh Mining Community, 1800-1980. National Museums & Galleries of Wales. Cardiff: National Museums & Galleries of Wales. ISBN 0-7200-0539-6. OCLC 53391691.
- Wiliam, Eurwyn (2010). The Welsh Cottage: Building Traditions of the Rural Poor, 1750-1900. Royal Commission on Ancient and Historical Monuments in Wales. Aberystwyth: Comisiwn Brenhinol Henebion Cymru / Royal Commission on the Ancient and Historical Monuments of Wales. ISBN 978-1-871184-37-2. OCLC 645696792.
- Wiliam, Eurwyn (2010). Y Bwthyn Cymreig: Arferion Adeiladu Tlodion Y Gymru Wledig, 1750-1900. Royal Commission on Ancient and Historical Monuments in Wales. Aberystwyth: Comisiwn Brenhinol Henebion Cymru. ISBN 978-1-871184-38-9. OCLC 751120475.
