= Moelfre =

Moelfre may refer to:

- Moelfre, Anglesey, a village and community on the Isle of Anglesey, Wales, United Kingdom
- Moelfre, Conwy, a place in the county borough of Conwy, Wales, United Kingdom
- Moelfre, Gwynedd, a hill in the Snowdonia range, in the county of Gwynedd, Wales, United Kingdom
- Moelfre, Powys, a hamlet in the community of Llansilin in the county of Powys, Wales, United Kingdom
- Moelfre island
