= Helen O'Neil (archaeologist) =

English archaeologist (1893–1984)

Helen O'Neil FSA MBE
- Born: Helen Evangeline Donovan; 1893
- Died: 23 August 1984 (aged 90–91)
- Occupation: archaeologist
- Known for: Iron Age settlements throughout south central England
- Notable work: excavations at Salmonsbury Iron Age camp
- Spouse: Bryan Hugh St. John O'Neil (m. 1939; died 1954)

Helen Evangeline O'Neil (née Donovan) FSA MBE (2 October 1893 – 23 August 1984) was an English archaeologist who specialized in Iron Age settlements throughout south central England. She was a member of the Royal Archaeological Institute and in 1968 was made a member of the Most Excellent Order of the British Empire for her contributions to archaeology.

== Early life ==
Helen Evangeline Donovan was born in 1893 in Mandalay, Burma (now Myanmar), where her father was a surgeon in the Indian Medical Service. The family moved to England sometime between 1901 and 1911, and around 1928 settled at Camp House in Bourton-on-the-Water, a rural village in the Cotswolds area of south central England. Camp House was located near the west entrance of the Salmonsbury Iron Age camp, an archaeological site consisting of a fortified enclosure believed to have been occupied from the Late Neolithic or Early Bronze Ages through the Roman period, possibly serving as a market center for trade. The archaeological activity in this area likely influenced her aspiring interest in archaeology.

== Archaeological activities ==
In 1931, O'Neil became actively involved in the archaeological activities at Salmonsbury Camp. Shortly afterward in 1932 and 1933, she became a member of the Royal Archaeological Institute and the Bristol and Gloucestershire Archaeological Society. Her renown as an archaeologist grew, and in 1938 she was invited to serve as the Honorary Curator of the Corinium Museum in Cirencester. During her excavation work at Salmonsbury, she met and married Bryan Hugh St. John O'Neil in 1939, a distinguished archaeologist at the Ministry of Works who would later become the Chief Inspector of Ancient Monuments.

O'Neil is the author of over 40 academic articles covering human artifacts such as axes, coins, and pottery in numerous sites throughout the United Kingdom, especially in Gloucestershire, Oxfordshire, Worcestershire, and Hertfordshire. She conducted work for a number of organizations, including the Ordnance Survey and the Ancient Monuments Inspectorate. Her findings over her four decade career have received many awards and recognitions. In 1948, she was elected as a Fellow to the Society of Antiquaries of London, and in 1968, she was recognized as an MBE, or Member of the Most Excellent Order of the British Empire.

A collection of her findings, including drawings, photographs, and numerous artifacts such as Iron Age currency bars, ornamental lead tanks, and human remains, has been displayed at the Wilson Arts Gallery and Museum, which, in 1984, under its old name, the Cheltenham Art Gallery and Museum, published records of her work and that of another prominent woman English archaeologist, Elsie Clifford.

== Personal life ==
For most of her adult life, the O'Neils lived away from Gloucester, but following her husband's death in 1954, she returned to Camp House in Bourton-on-the-Water, from where she conducted most of her later archaeological studies. Helen died in 1984.
