= Ffridd Faldwyn, Montgomery =

Iron Age hill fort near Montgomery, Wales

- Powys, Wales
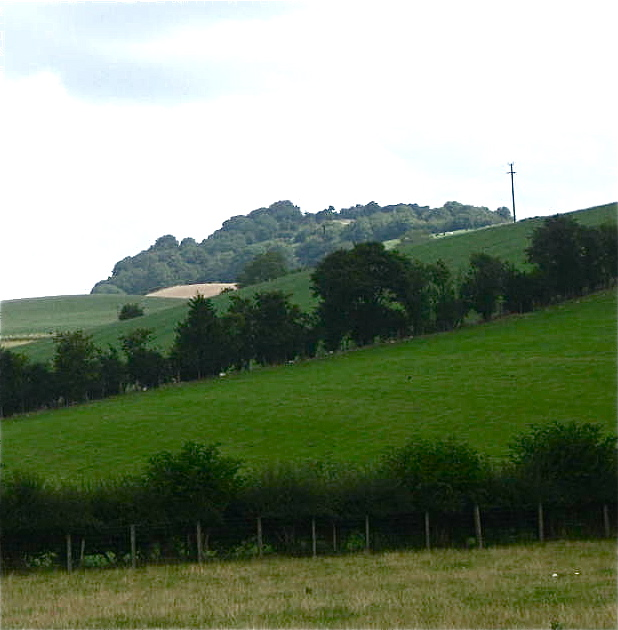
- Fridd Faldwyn Iron Age Hillfort on the skyline, as viewed from Llandyssil

Location
- Location in Wales Powys
- Coordinates: 52.56°N 3.16°W
- Grid reference: SO217969

Ffridd Faldwyn is an Iron Age hillfort in northern Powys, in the former county of Montgomeryshire, It is sited on a prominent hill west of Montgomery, close to but higher than Montgomery Castle, overlooking the River Severn. It is one of the largest hill-forts in Wales.

== Description and history ==
When Thomas Pennant visited Montgomery in 1776, he noted

"On a hill, not far from the castle, is a stupendous British post. The approach is guarded by four great ditches, with two or three entrances towards the main work, with two or three fosses run across the hill, the end of which is sufficiently guarded by its steepness".

It is described as a multivallate contour fort, and is currently well wooded and overgrown, although a footpath leads from the adjacent small road through the site and down through the beechwood on the prow of the hill to the main road below. The site was described and surveyed in June 1909, by the Royal Commission on the Ancient and Historical Monuments of Wales. A detailed survey of the hillfort was published in 1932 by Dr Willoughby Gardner, and this led to excavations being carried out by B. H. St John O’Neil between 1937 and 1939,

== The excavations 1937-39 ==
These excavations by St John O'Neil, who was the Inspector of Ancient Monuments in Wales, were carried out to a high standard. Five sections were cut across the various ramparts and three area excavations were opened. This was following the most recent excavation practices developed by Mortimer Wheeler for his excavations at the hillfort at Maiden Castle in Dorset. O’Neill was able to define the earliest phase of the hillfort as smaller enclosure measuring 170 m by 80 m (1.2 hectares), with a gateway to the south, and defended with two rows of timber palisades. This enclosure stands on the highest area of the hill and contains a small mound which may have been a Bronze Age round barrow. Under the southern gate of this enclosure evidence for earlier Neolithic occupation was found. This enclosure was then modified by a box framed timber rampart, with an extension to the north-west and a barbican added to the south gateway. The inner area of the enclosure contained a number of rectangular "four-poster" structures, which are now interpreted as the supports for wooden framed granaries.

The next phase was to greatly enlarge the hillfort, with timber laced ramparts, which took in much of the slope of the hill to the north-west, towards the river Severn. The hillfort now measured 300 m by 200 m, and covered 4.4 hectares. The existing banks of this enclosure still in places stand to between 3 m and 8 m in height. A large "annexe" area was added to the south-west gateway of this enclosure which may have acted as a barbican. The defences of the larger hillfort appear to have fallen into decay, and at some point, possibly at the time of the Roman conquest of Britain, were refurbished with a simple earthen bank.

== Interpretation ==
The lack of finds from the excavations (only one piece of Iron Age pottery was discovered) and the absence of radio carbon dating for the ramparts and other structures, means that it is difficult to date the various phases of O'Neil's excavations. There is the possibility that the earlier smaller enclosure dates from the Later Bronze Age and was contemporary with the earliest phase of the Breidden Hill fort near Welshpool. The larger hillfort of the later phase belongs to Barry Cunliffe’s "developed form" of hillfort and bears comparison with such Wessex hillforts as Maiden Castle and Danebury in Hampshire, as well as Old Oswestry in Shropshire. Cunliffe has suggested that these "developed hillforts" went out of use in the 2nd century BC. Also, using Danebury as a model, Cunliffe has shown how "developed hillforts" have a pattern of smaller hillforts and settlements surrounding them. In the case of Fridd Faldwyn, it is possible to detect this in the neighbouring parishes of Llandyssil and Llanmerewig . These include smaller hillforts at Goron Ddu, Coed y Wig, Cefn Llan and Fronfraith in Llandyssil and Giant's Bank in Llanmerewig

== See also ==
- List of hillforts in Wales
