= Helen O'Neill (academic) =

Helen O'Neill is a leading development scholar who was the founding director of the Centre for Development Studies at the University College Dublin.

== Evidence of notability ==
Between 1993 and 1999, she was president of the European Association of Development Research and Training Institutes. She was chair of the Advisory Committee on Development Cooperation and the Commission for Justice and Peace in Éire. She has also published many academic papers in peer reviewed academic journals on a wide range of topics in development studies and international relations. In 2006, a festschrift was published to honour her and her work.

== Other sources ==
Bne Saad, Majda and Maura Leen (eds)(2006)Trade, Aid and Development: Essays in Honour of Helen O'Neill ISBN 978-1-904558-51-4
