= Ellis Davies (priest) =

Welsh priest and antiquarian (1872–1962)

Ellis Davies (22 September 1872 – 3 April 1962) was a Welsh priest and antiquarian.

His father was Ellis Davies, a Flintshire gardener. Whilst he was young the family moved to Llaniestyn, Caernarfonshire, where he received education at Botwnnog Grammar School.

He later studied at St David's College, Lampeter, on a scholarship, graduating in 1895 when he was also ordained, serving as curate in Llansilin. He subsequently moved to Old Colwyn, and to St. Giles, Oxford. There he studied for a B.A. from Worcester College, graduating in 1907, before taking his M.A. in 1911.

In 1909 he was appointed vicar of Llanddoged, Denbighshire, before, in 1913, transferring to an appointment at Whitford, Flintshire, where he remained until his retirement in 1951. His wife, Mary Louisa (née Davies, died in 1937. In the same year, he was made a canon of St Asaph Cathedral.

He investigated and acquired information about the archaeological remains in the district, and surveyed Penycloddiau hillfort. His writings include The Prehistoric and Roman Remains of Denbighshire (1929), The Prehistoric and Roman Remains of Flintshire (1949), Llyfr y Proffwyd Hosea (1920), Flintshire Place-names (1959), articles in Yr Haul, Y Llan and a number of historical journals, and several hymn-tunes. He was also joint editor of Archaeologia Cambrensis for 15 years (from 1925), and later sole editor (1940–48).

He died in 1962 at Bryn Derwen, Caerwys, Flintshire, and was survived by 3 sons and 3 daughters.
