= The History of the Norman Conquest of England =

Academic historical work

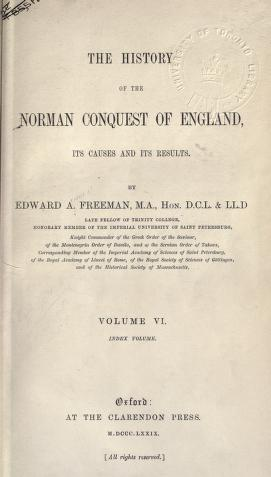
Title page of the first edition of the last volume

The History of the Norman Conquest of England: Its Causes and Its Results is a six-volume study of the Conquest by Edward A. Freeman, published between 1867 and 1879. Recognised by critics as a major work of scholarship on its first publication, it has since proved unpopular with readers, many of whom were put off by its enormous length and copious detail. Academics have often criticized it for its heavily Whig treatment of the subject, and its glorification of Anglo-Saxon political and social institutions at the expense of their feudal successors, but its influence has nevertheless been profound, many Anglo-Norman historians of modern times having come around to some of Freeman's main conclusions.

== Composition and publication ==
Freeman first wrote about the Conquest while he was still a student at Oxford, where his 1846 essay "The Effects of the Conquest of England by the Normans" was submitted for, but failed to win, a prize. In 1859 and 1865 he published lengthy reviews of the last two volumes of Sir Francis Palgrave's History of Normandy and of England. Exploring his points of agreement and disagreement with Palgrave, Freeman decided to embark on his own history of the Conquest, reasoning that its approaching 800th anniversary might well make such a work popular. He believed that he had so completely worked out his own position on the historical controversies involved that "there will be little more to do than write down what is already in my head". He began work on the History on 7 December 1865, writing to a friend that it was a book "which I can do easier than anybody else, as I have worked so much at the subject for twenty years past". In the event, Freeman's decision to trace the remoter causes of the Conquest in much greater detail than he had originally planned put paid to all hopes of bringing his history down to William the Conqueror's accession in time for the octocentenary. His first volume, taking the story as far as the death of Harthacnut, appeared in 1867; subsequent volumes in 1868, 1869 and 1871 dealt with the reigns of Edward the Confessor, Harold Godwinson and William the Conqueror respectively; and an 1876 volume explored the consequences of the Conquest in later reigns, with a final index volume in 1879. Freeman later issued two revised editions.

Freeman aimed his History at both specialists and non-specialists. In an 1867 letter he wrote that

I have to make my text a narrative which I hope may be intelligible to girls and curates, and in an appendix to discuss the evidence for each point in a way which I hope may be satisfactory to Gneist and Stubbs.

He drew on the massive corpus of primary sources published over the previous eighty years, and on the works of 19th-century historians, particularly Augustin Thierry, Sharon Turner, Sir Francis Palgrave, and J. M. Lappenberg, but he felt it unnecessary to search out manuscript material and never went to either the British Museum Library or the Public Record Office, preferring his own well-stocked bookshelves. He also corresponded with scholars such as J. R. Green, James Bryce, W. F. Hook, W. R. W. Stephens, and especially William Stubbs, for whom he always professed the greatest admiration, as did Stubbs of him. A contemporary rhyme went:

See, ladling butter from alternate tubs
Stubbs butters Freeman, Freeman butters Stubbs.

Frank Barlow summarised Freeman's qualifications to write such a history:

a good knowledge of languages, including Anglo-Saxon, and an interest in field archaeology and architecture, with the ability to sketch buildings and their features. He was much involved in politics and not unreasonably regarded participation in government as useful training for a historian…Above all, he had tremendous zest.

Marjorie Chibnall added that in his knowledge of medieval chronicles Freeman had no rival. As a set-off to this list Barlow noted Freeman's dogmatism, pugnacity and indifference to various subjects he considered irrelevant to his survey of 11th century England: theology, philosophy, and most of the arts.

Freeman went on to publish a history of The Reign of William Rufus (1882), in two volumes. He also wrote a series of works on the Anglo-Saxon and Norman periods aimed at a popular readership: Old English History for Children, a work he had had in mind since before he began the History of the Norman Conquest, was published in 1869; A Short History of the Norman Conquest in 1880; and William the Conqueror in 1888. In 1974 J. W. Burrow produced an abridged edition of the History of the Norman Conquest of England.

== Themes ==
Freeman was a man of deeply held convictions, which he expounded in the History of the Norman Conquest and other works with vigour and enthusiasm. These included the belief, common to many thinkers of his generation, in the superiority of those peoples that spoke Indo-European languages, especially the Greek, Roman and Germanic peoples, and in their genetic cousinhood; also in the purely Teutonic nature of the English nation. He asserted that the Anglo-Saxon invaders of England had largely killed or driven out the original Celtic inhabitants, though he admitted that "the women would doubtless be largely spared", an exception which fatally flawed his argument. His conviction of the racial purity of the Anglo-Saxon people was highly influential on later generations of writers. His enthusiasm for Anglo-Saxondom knew few bounds when it came to their social and political institutions, and to his greatest heroes. These included Alfred the Great, Earl Godwin and Harold Godwinson, though he also began increasingly to admire William for his policy of protecting his revolution by retaining Old English institutions wherever possible. Freeman placed much greater faith in Anglo-Saxon historical writings than in the Norman chronicles, which he considered vitiated by sycophancy to the Norman court. He had learned from Thomas Arnold a belief in the continuous and cyclical nature of history in general. Taking his cue from Francis Palgrave, Freeman applied this to early medieval history by making the thoroughly Whiggish claim that the first parliaments of the reigns of Henry III and Edward I had brought the country back to something like the Anglo-Saxon institution of the Witenaġemot, or national council, and that the constitution of the country had evolved through the Conquest period rather than being entirely remade. An unbroken line thus connected the Witenaġemot with Victorian democracy. This all had the effect of diminishing the significance of his own subject, since it meant that 1066 had for Freeman "not the importance either of a beginning or of an ending, but the importance of a turning point". Hammering the point home, he wrote that,

I cannot too often repeat, for the saying is the very summing up of the whole history, that the Norman Conquest was not the wiping out of the constitution, the laws, the language, the national life, of Englishmen.

== Reception ==
The book's sales were healthy, but never so great as Freeman had hoped. Doubtless this was partly caused by the sheer off-putting size of his books, but perhaps also by the fact that his historical prejudices were quite out in the open, leading readers to wonder whether his conclusions could be trusted.

Reviews of the History were respectful and in most cases favourable, though some reservations were expressed. The Gentleman's Magazine, for example, noted the harshness with which Freeman treated his opponents and his "unmistakably strong belief in the correctness of his own views", but agreed with many of them, excepting only his insistence on spelling Anglo-Saxon personal names (Ecgberht, Ælfred etc.) in unmodernized form. The Saturday Review, the North American Review and the Literary World all agreed in regretting Freeman's indifference to social history, as opposed to political and military history. The Month, a Catholic magazine, objected only to Freeman's outspokenly Protestant opinions on the "abject superstition" of some of the medieval saints, and bade him keep a civil tongue in his head on this point. The Edinburgh Review reached a more ambivalent verdict than most. It praised him for finding a middle line between the conflicting views of Thierry and Palgrave on the importance of the Conquest, and acknowledged that on many important points "Mr. Freeman has pronounced a judgment which will be accepted as conclusive by all historical scholars", but it devoted much space to its impatience with Freeman's enthusiasm for Anglo-Saxon institutions and for his particular heroes. Chambers's Cyclopædia of English Literature told a wide readership that the History was "among the great works of the present century".

But in the later years of Freeman's life the book's reputation was injured by a series of attacks levelled on it by the genealogist and local historian J. H. Round. Round brought against Freeman the same kind of aggressively pedantic nit-picking that Freeman himself had been used to bring against other historians. Round was neither interested in nor knowledgeable about Anglo-Saxon history, but had "an instinctive feeling that in England our consecutive political history does, in a sense, begin with the Norman conquest". Part of his motivation was political: as a Conservative who detested Freeman's Liberalism he reached the damning verdict that Freeman "was a democrat first, and historian afterwards". Freeman and his supporters responded to Round's criticisms, but Round did not give up the attack. "Truth cannot be silenced, facts cannot be obscured", he wrote. "I appeal, sure of my ground, to the verdict of historical scholars, awaiting, with confidence and calm, the inevitable triumph of the truth." Many of his attacks on Freeman were well placed, and their effect was to turn a whole generation of scholars against him, while to the general reading public, as Freeman himself acknowledged, "I seem to be either unknown or a subject for mockery".

After Freeman's death in 1892 critical opinion slowly began to change. In 1906 Thomas Hodgkin, without endorsing the accuracy of Freeman's History, called it "the great quarry from which all later builders will hew their blocks for building", and as the 20th century advanced the tide continued to turn as academics examined Freeman's Norman Conquest with renewed interest, even if the general public did not. The historian D. J. A. Matthew considered it "one of the most cited but least read historical monuments written on any historical subject." One exception was General George S. Patton, who in 1944 read Freeman's History in advance of the D-Day landings, hoping to learn where to conduct a campaign in Normandy by studying William the Conqueror's choice of roads. In 1953 David Douglas wrote that

as a detailed narrative of the Norman Conquest, Freeman's book has never been superseded, and it is those best versed in the history of eleventh-century England who are most conscious of its value.

Frank Barlow saw Freeman's influence as being profound. Modern historians, Frank Stenton and Ann Williams among them, have again come to share some of his beliefs, including the existence of a degree of historical continuity across the Norman Conquest, and to view English and Norman events in the broader context of European history. In 1967 R. Allen Brown called the History "a notorious high-water mark in studies of 1066". In the present century Anthony Brundage and Richard A. Cosgrove have been more reprehensive, writing that the History’s

organization, judgments, and style strike the modern reader as well over the top: uncritical and injudicious, remorselessly detailed, and a prose that adored long, languid sentences.

They nevertheless admit that

Even after knowledge of their shortcomings [is] taken into consideration, his conclusions remain a powerful voice on behalf of a nation whose past and present gloried in liberty, democracy and constitutional government

and they acknowledge that Freeman's views on the English national identity have had a lasting influence.
