= Zachary Macaulay =

Scottish abolitionist and statistician (1768–1838)

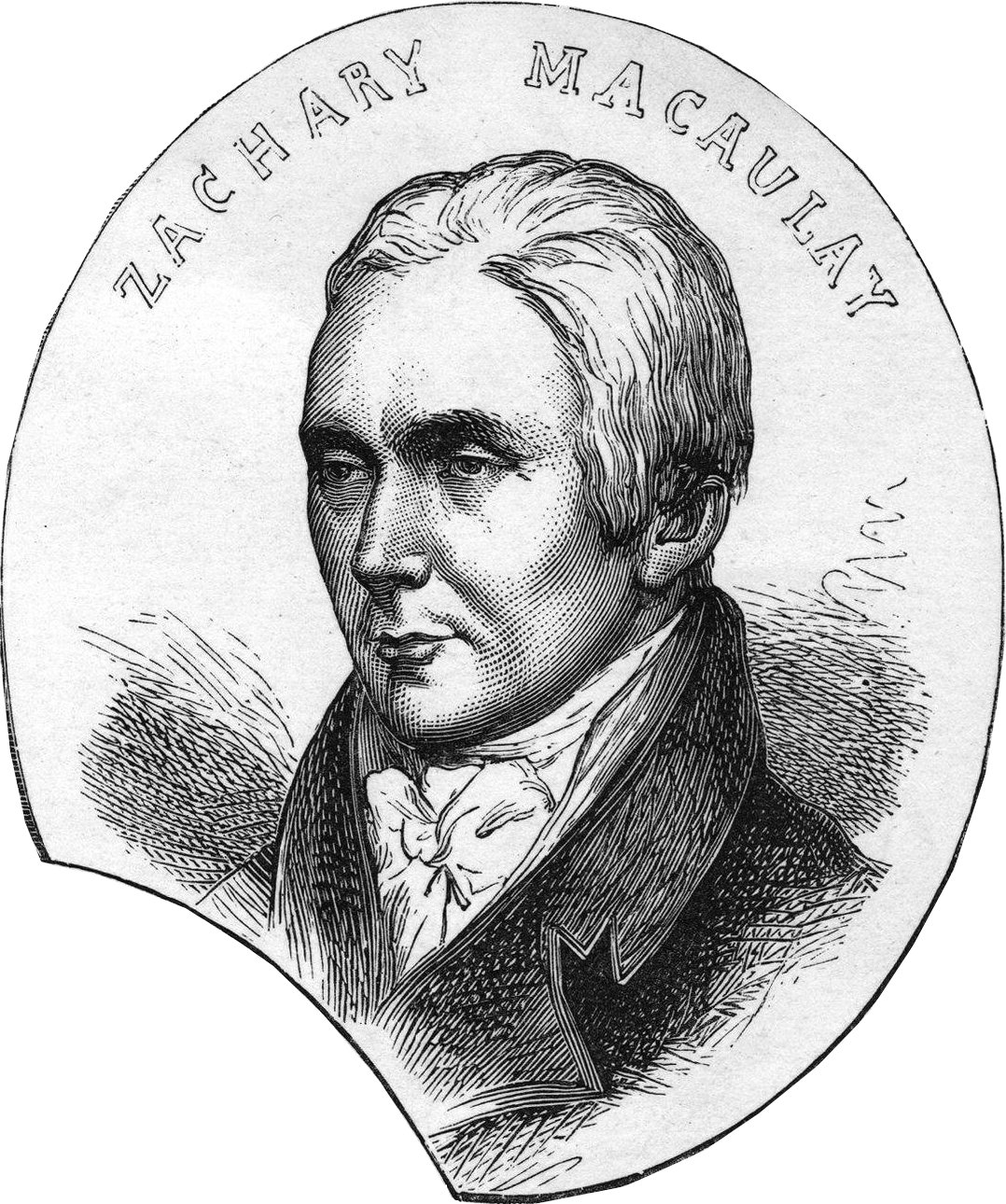
Zachary Macaulay

Zachary Macaulay (Scottish Gaelic: Sgàire MacAmhlaoibh; 2 May 1768 – 13 May 1838) was a Scottish British statistician and abolitionist who was a founder of London University and of the Society for the Suppression of Vice, and a Governor of British Sierra Leone.

== Early life ==
Macaulay was born in Inveraray, in Scotland, in what was then Great Britain (now the United Kingdom), to Margaret Campbell and John Macaulay (1720 – 1789), who was a minister of the Church of Scotland and a grandson of Dòmhnall Cam. He had two brothers: Aulay Macaulay, who was an antiquary, and Colin Macaulay, who was a general and an abolitionist. Zachary Macaulay was not educated in, but taught himself, Greek and Latin and English literature.

== Career ==
Macaulay worked in a merchant's office in Glasgow, where he fell into bad company and began to indulge in excessive drinking. In late 1784, when aged 16, he emigrated to Jamaica. There, he worked as an assistant manager at a sugar plantation. However, he objected to slavery, contrary to the preference of his father, and renounced his job. He returned, in 1789, to London, where he reduced his alcoholism and became a bookkeeper. He was influenced by Thomas Babington of Rothley Temple, Leicestershire, an evangelical Whig abolitionist whom his sister Jean had married, and by whom he was influenced and introduced to William Wilberforce and Henry Thornton. In 1790, Macaulay visited Sierra Leone, the West African colony that was founded by the Sierra Leone Company for emancipated slaves. In 1792, he returned to serve on its Council. He was invested as Governor in 1794, and remained in that role until 1799.

Macaulay became a member of the Society for the Abolition of the Slave Trade, with William Wilberforce, to campaign for the abolition of slavery in the British Empire. He later became the secretary of the African Institution. He and Wilberforce also became members of the Clapham Sect of evangelical Whigs, that included Henry Thornton and Edward Eliot, for whom he edited the magazine, the Christian Observer, from 1802 to 1816. Macaulay served on committees that established London University, and that established the Society for the Suppression of Vice. He was also a fellow of the Royal Society, and an active supporter of the British and Foreign Bible Society, and of the Cheap Repository Tracts, and of the Church Missionary Society. Macaulay contributed to the 1823 foundation of the Society for the Mitigation and Gradual Abolition of Slavery, and he was editor of its publication, the Anti-Slavery Reporter, in which he censured the analysis of indentured labour by the British Colonial Office expert Thomas Moody However, Zachary Macaulay desired a 'free black peasantry' rather than equality for Africans.

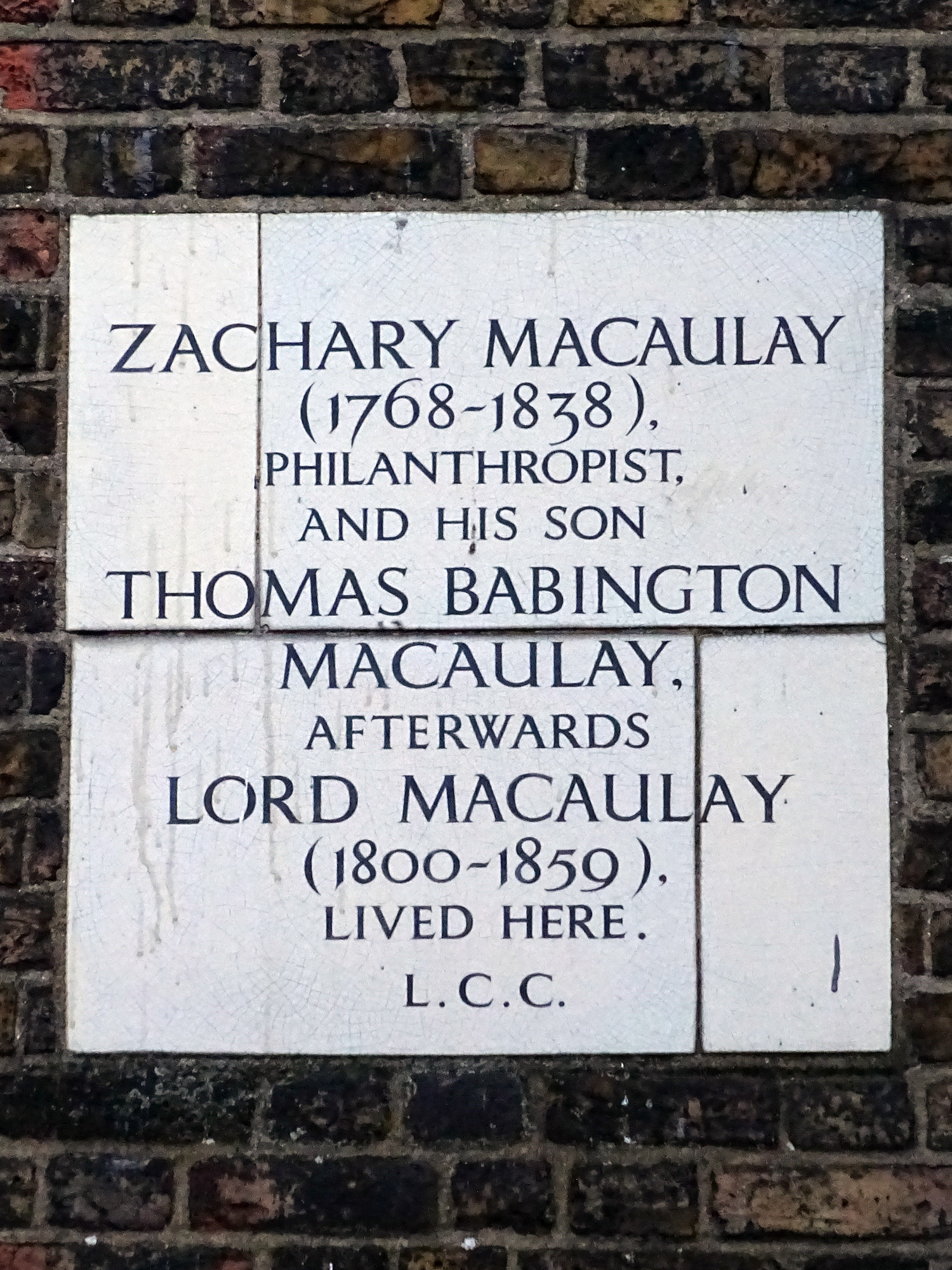
Stone plaque erected in 1930 by London County Council at 5 The Pavement, Clapham

Macaulay died on 13 May 1838 in London, where he was buried in St George's Gardens, Bloomsbury, and where a memorial to him was erected in Westminster Abbey.

== Personal life ==
Macaulay married Selina Mills, who was the daughter of the Quaker printer Thomas Mills. They were introduced by Hannah More on 26 August 1799. They settled in Clapham, Surrey, and had several children including Thomas Babington Macaulay, who was a Whig historian and politician, and Hannah More Macaulay (1810 – 1873), who married Sir Charles Trevelyan, 1st Baronet and was the mother of Sir George Trevelyan, 2nd Baronet.
