= J. W. Burrow =

British historian (1935–2009)

John Wyon Burrow, FBA (4 June 1935 in Southsea – 3 November 2009 in Witney, Oxfordshire) was an English historian of intellectual history. His published works include assessments of the Whig interpretation of history and of historiography generally. According to The Independent: "John Burrow was one of the leading intellectual historians of his generation. His pioneering work marked the beginning of a more sophisticated approach to the history of the social sciences, one that did not treat the past as being of interest only in so far as it anticipated the present."

== Life ==
Burrow was born in Southsea. In 1954 after graduating from Exeter School, he won a history scholarship to Christ's College, Cambridge, where he became a pupil of J.H. Plumb and obtained a First in both parts of the History Tripos.

Fellowships at Christ's College, Cambridge and Downing College, Cambridge enabled Burrow to complete a doctorate within a new branch of history. It involved a study of the attractions of evolutionary theories, chiefly those of Herbert Spencer, Sir Henry Maine, and Edward Burnett Tylor, to 19th century social theorists. He argued that they were a means of reconciling the disparate demands of romantic-historical and positivistic approaches to society. The result was his first book Evolution and Society (1966), which explores the reasons why Victorian pioneers of social science were habitually approaching the study of other societies with largely positivistic and evolutionary methodologies, making anthropology into a search for affirmation of assumed laws and stages of progress rather than a quest to appreciate and understand other societies in terms of their own uniqueness and functionality.

Burrow was also an expert on Charles Darwin and the potent racial theories that Social Darwinism drew from biological versions of the theory of evolution. His introduction to the Penguin Books edition of The Origin of Species is still an authoritative contribution to the cultural history of Victorian science.

Despite his desire for a Cambridge appointment, Burrow's first appointment was as lecturer in European studies at the University of East Anglia from 1965 to 1969, after which he moved in 1982 to the School of Social Sciences at the University of Sussex, where he taught a cross-disciplinary course on the history and philosophy of the social sciences in collaboration with Stefan Collini and Donald Winch, resulting in the collaborative book That Noble Science of Politics (1983), which extended the scope of the anti-teleological approach adopted in Burrow's first book. He later made use of his unrivaled knowledge of the Whig and Burkean component within English liberalism in his Carlyle Lectures at Oxford, the results appearing as Whigs and Liberals: Continuity and Change in English Political Thought (1988).

Sussex was the first university in Britain to offer an undergraduate degree in intellectual history, and Burrow became the first to occupy the chair in this branch of history created for him in 1981, the year in which his book A Liberal Descent: Victorian Historians and the English Past, appeared and was awarded the Wolfson History Prize. To this study of the works of Thomas Babington Macaulay, 1st Baron Macaulay, William Stubbs, Edward Augustus Freeman and James Anthony Froude he later added a short book on Edward Gibbon (1985).

Burrow's 1981 book won the Wolfson History Prize. In that work he proposed that the 19th-century historians William Stubbs, John Richard Green, and Edward Augustus Freeman were historical scholars with little or no experience of public affairs, with views of the present which were romantically historicised, and who were drawn to history by an antiquarian passion for the past and by a patriotic and populist impulse to identify the nation and its institutions as the collective subject of English history, making

"the new historiography of early medieval times an extension, filling out and democratising, of older Whig notions of continuity. It was Stubbs who presented this most substantially; Green who made it popular and dramatic ... It is in Freeman ... of the three the most purely a narrative historian, that the strains are most apparent."

In the same work Burrow remarked of another nineteenth-century historian, James Anthony Froude, that he was a leading promoter of the imperialist excitement of the closing years of the century, but that in the mass of his work even empire took second place to religion.

In another chapter, under the title The German inheritance: a people and its institutions, Burrow referred to the earlier historian Edward Gibbon, who had been writing in the reign of the Hanoverian monarch George III of the United Kingdom at the time of the American Revolutionary War. Burrow mentioned that, in The History of the Decline and Fall of the Roman Empire, Gibbon, as if affecting a superiority to patriotic prejudice and at the same time affirming its existence in his own time, had written that the Saxons were, for an Englishman, the barbarians from whom he derives his name, his laws and perhaps his origin.

The image chosen for the front cover of A Liberal Descent was the sculpture of Queen Victoria and Prince Albert in Saxon Dress executed by William Theed (1804–91) for the Royal Mausoleum at Frogmore In the book Burrow wrote of 'peremptory and legalistic constitutionalism changing into subtler political persuasiveness', and of 'the intersection of personal and public mythologies'. The book's theme was the idea of a Whig interpretation of English history ('Whig history') incorporating the two fundamental notions of progress and continuity, the one making it possible to treat English history as a success story, the other endorsing a pragmatic, gradualist political style as the foundation of English freedom. In studies of Thomas Babington Macaulay, 1st Baron Macaulay, William Stubbs, Edward Augustus Freeman and James Anthony Froude, Burrow attempted to place them in a cultural and historiographical context; and sought to establish the nature and limits of the self-confidence which the Victorians were able to derive from the national past, with reference to three great crises of English history: the Norman conquest of England, the English Reformation and the 'Glorious Revolution' of the 17th century.

The theme of the inscription on the plinth of the statue, alluding to the poet's lament for the passing of 'Sweet Auburn' Oliver Goldsmith's The Deserted Village may also be seen in connection with what Burrow mentions in the later book The Crisis of Reason: European Thought, 1848–1914 (2000): "'...the growth of great cities with mass population.... The great city and its teeming population was the dominant social image of the period: its excitement, its horrors, its threat to social order and decency... its dwarfing impersonality. It was in the great city that the new democracy lurked, perhaps beyond the reach of civilising influence.'

There could be added the influence of Prince Albert connected with the Great Exhibition and the South Kensington Museums, Imperial College, and Albert Hall of 'Albertopolis', although Albert's name is not among those in the index of Burrow's book.

In 1986 Burrow was elected a fellow of the British Academy. In 1995–2000 he was a professor of European thought at the University of Oxford and a fellow Balliol College, Oxford, becoming emeritus professor in 2000–2009; he officially retired in 2000.

The Crisis of Reason: European Thought, 1848–1914 (2000) covered 19th century European thinkers including John Stuart Mill, Mikhail Bakunin, Friedrich Nietzsche, Marcel Proust, Gustave Flaubert, Richard Wagner, and Oscar Wilde.

Burrow's last major work (his magnum opus) A History of Histories (2007) covers the entire 2,500-year period from Herodotus and Thucydides to trends in late 20th century history, including Livy, Tacitus, Bede, Jean Froissart, Edward Hyde, 1st Earl of Clarendon, Edward Gibbon, Thomas Babington Macaulay, 1st Baron Macaulay, Jules Michelet, William Hickling Prescott, and Francis Parkman.

In 1958 he married Diane Dunnington; they had one son, Lawrence, and one daughter, Francesca.

The J. W. Burrow papers, catalogued posthumously by Peter Xavier Price between 2010 and 2012, are now housed at The Keep, Brighton.

== Works ==
- Evolution and Society (Cambridge University Press, 1966) read online
- A Liberal Descent: Victorian Historians and the English Past (Cambridge University Press, 1981) read online review
- That Noble Science of Politics: A Study in Nineteenth-Century Intellectual History (with Stefan Collini and Donald Winch) (Cambridge University Press, 1983) read online review
- Whigs and Liberals: Continuity and Change in English Political Thought (Clarendon Press, 1988) read online
- The Crisis of Reason: European Thought, 1848–1914 (Yale University Press, 2000) read online
- A History of Histories: Epics, Chronicles, Romances and Inquiries from Herodotus and Thucydides to the Twentieth Century. New York: Knopof. 2007.

== See also ==
- Intellectual History
