= Precursorism =

Historiographical bias based in anachronism

Precursorism (called in its more extreme forms precursoritis or precursitis) is historiographical bias in which a historian seeks direct precursors of present-day institutions or ideas in earlier historical periods, where none may clearly exist. Precursorist historical narratives are anachronistic: cherry picking data and often failing to account for the perspectives of people in the contemporary past. Precursorism is considered to be a form of Whig history, and is a special problem among historians of science.

It is now commonly assumed that historians of science should study past scientific "ideas in their own right, avoiding anachronism and precursoritis."

== Examples of precursorism ==
The French historian of medieval science, Pierre Duhem, exemplifies several of the characteristics of the quest for precursors of modern scientific ideas. Duhem was trained as a physicist, rather than as a historian; he was French and many of the precursors he identified were French or studied at the University of Paris; he was a devout Catholic and many of the precursors of the theologically troubling Italian, Galileo, were members of religious orders. Most striking among them was the French bishop and scholastic philosopher, Nicole Oresme.

The concept has been applied to those who would find precursors of Darwin in the early nineteenth century, and to those who would find anticipations of modern science in ancient cultures from the Near East to Mesoamerica. Precursorism has recently been identified as a significant factor in some studies of the work of Islamic scientists.

In 2018, Hans-Johann Glock identified precursorism as a tendency among analytic philosophers who study the history of philosophy. He describes the tendency as "a veritable fetishism of alleged or actual intellectual precursors" and "a déformation professionnelle, which afflicts... historians and philosophers". Glock describes a handful of contemporary analytical philosophers as interpreting certain historical western philosophers ahistorically; possessing philosophical beliefs which align with modern philosophical schools that did not exist during their lifetimes. Additionally, Glock recalls moments when living analytical philosophers "resisted attempts to co-opt them into various historical schools [of philosophy]".
