= Selina Mills =

English educator and evangelist

Selina Anne Mills
- Born: 1767
- Died: May 1831 (aged 63–64)
- Occupations: Educator, schoolteacher
- Spouse: Zachary Macaulay (m. 1799)
- Children: Thomas Babington Macaulay and 8 others
- Father: Thomas Mills

Selina Anne Mills (1767 – May 1831) was a British schoolteacher who bought a girls school in Park Street, Bristol in December 1789 with her sisters Mary and Fanny, from Mary, Elizabeth, Sarah and Patty More, the sisters of Hannah More.

== Family life ==
Mills was the daughter of the Bristol printer and bookseller, Thomas Mills. She went on to marry Zachary Macaulay in August 1799. The couple had been introduced to each other by Hannah More on 26 August 1799, who later, with her sister, Patty, attempted to frustrate their courtship. They settled in Clapham, Surrey. They had nine children, including:

- Thomas Babington Macaulay (1800–1859) the historian, poet and politician.
- Selina Macaulay (1802–1858)
- Jean Macaulay (1804–1830)
- Rev. John Macaulay (1805–1874)
- Henry William Macaulay (1806–1836) married Margaret, daughter of Thomas Denman, 1st Baron Denman.
- Frances Macaulay (1808–1888)
- Hannah More Macaulay (1810–1873) who married Sir Charles Trevelyan and was the mother of Sir George Otto Trevelyan.
- Margaret Macaulay (1812–1834) married Edward Cropper, son of James Cropper.
- Charles Zachary Macaulay (1814–1886)

== The Bristol elopement ==
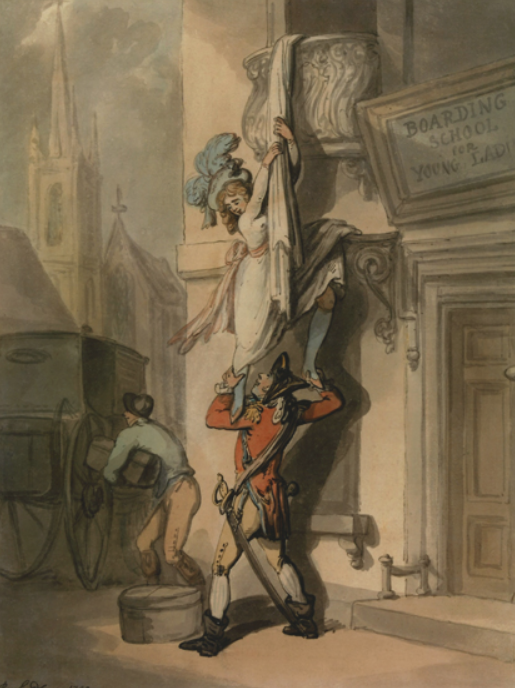
Caricature of the Bristol Elopement by Thomas Rowlandson

Mills got caught up in the elopement of Clementina Clerke, a wealthy heiress being educated at the school. Rowlandson's caricature is inaccurate: an accomplice posing as a servant delivered a letter to Selina purporting to come from Clerke's guardian requesting that Clementina take the carriage provided in order to go and see him immediately. Selina and Mary saw Miss Clerke into the carriage, but only later realised they had been duped.
