= Thomas Mills (printer) =

English printer

Thomas Mills (c. 1735–1820) was an English printer who established a business in Vine Street Bristol during the seventeenth century. He became a Quaker in 1778, but they later disowned him in 1789.

Mills was one of a group of Bristol Behmenists who preserved the manuscripts of William Law and Dionysius Andreas Freher.

His daughter, Selina Mills, married Zachary Macaulay.

== Books published ==
- 1774 Madame Guyon: The Worship of God, in Spirit and in Truth (Bristol)
- 1775 Jacob Boehme: The Way to Christ Discovered (Bath)
