= Philosophic Whigs =

The Philosophic Whigs were a significant grouping in the nineteenth century Whig party, who drew on the ideas of the Scottish Enlightenment to bring the concept of social change and progress to British political thought.

== A middle way ==
The ideas of the Philosophic Whigs formed themselves in opposition to two competing trends - those of the Utilitarians and the Radicals on the one hand, and those of the Tories on the other. Philosophic Whigs such as Sir James Mackintosh or Thomas Babington Macaulay attacked the former for an abstract approach to society and a neglect of historical roots; the latter for looking back to an idealised past and neglecting historical change and developmental time. Similarly, they condemned the French Revolution for over-abstraction on the one hand, and a slavish apeing of Roman republicanism on the other.

They saw the need to adjust institutions to a changing society as a priority. Thus, during the debate over the Great Reform Act, Macaulay made good use of the concept of historical change to support the case for parliamentary reform: "Another great intellectual revolution has taken place....There is a change in society. There must be a corresponding change in the government".

Their thinking passed in to the Victorian mainstream, through figures like Bagehot and Dicey who saw the need for laws to adapt to changing social structures and habits.

=== Criticism ===
Conservative thinkers saw the Whig emphasis on progress – what Scrope called the "progressive and indefinite amelioration in the circumstances of mankind" – as a dangerously Utopian illusion.

== Literary examples ==
John Buchan in The Moon Endureth mocked a philosophic Whig for imagining himself the Emperor of Byzantium in his spare time.

== See also ==
- Edinburgh Review
- Francis Jeffrey, Lord Jeffrey
- Henry Hallam
- March of Intellect
- Whig interpretation of history
