= Peter Xavier Price =

British artist and historian (born 1985)

- Born: 1985 (age 39–40); Epsom, Surrey
- Known for: Illustrations of J.R.R. Tolkien's legendarium

Peter Xavier Price (born 1985 in Epsom, Surrey) is a British artist, illustrator and academic historian. As an artist, he is known primarily for his illustrations of J.R.R. Tolkien's legendarium, particularly The Silmarillion and The Lord of the Rings.

Alongside illustration, Price is an academic historian who studied at the University of Sussex, UK, from where he holds a doctorate in Intellectual History. He specialises in the history of social, political, religious and economic thought. His PhD thesis centred on the writings and free trade ideas of the eighteenth-century political economist and Anglican Dean of Gloucester, Josiah Tucker. Funded by the Arts and Humanities Research Council, in 2012-13 Price was also awarded a scholarship to conduct research at the John W. Kluge Center, The Library of Congress, Washington D.C.

From 2010 to 2012, Price catalogued the private papers of the intellectual historian, J. W. Burrow, which are now housed at The Keep, Brighton. His work has been published in Modern Intellectual History (Cambridge University Press).

== See also ==
- Works inspired by J. R. R. Tolkien
