= Llanrumney Hall =

Country house in Cardiff, Wales

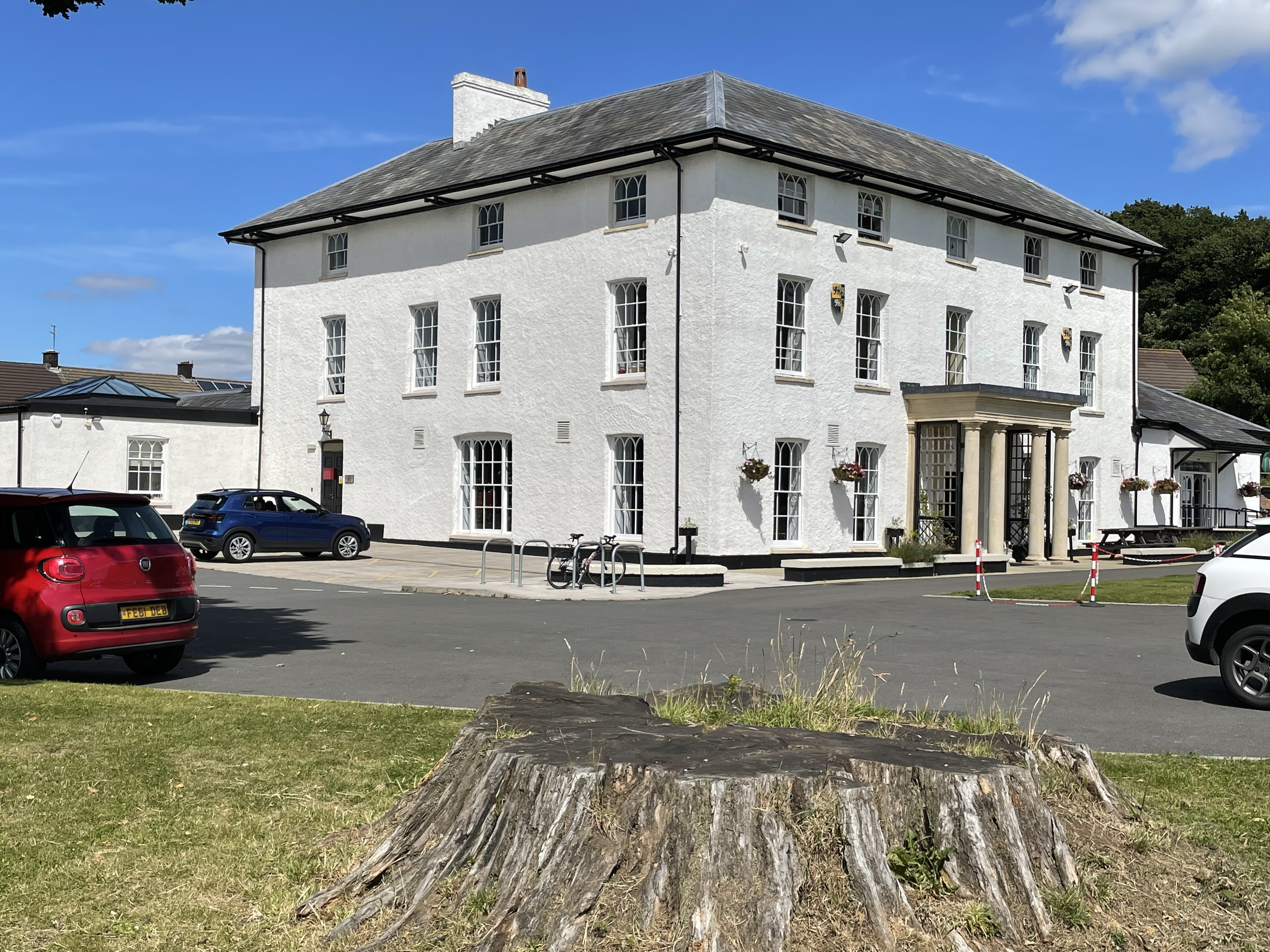
- Llanrumney Hall in July 2022

- Location within Cardiff
- Alternative names: Neuadd Llanrhymni

General information
- Type: Country house; former public house
- Location: Ball Road, Llanrumney, Cardiff, Wales
- Coordinates: 51°31′19.7″N 3°7′47.2″W
- Construction started: 1450
- Owner: Cardiff Council

Llanrumney Hall (Welsh: Neuadd Llanrhymni) is Grade II* listed building in Llanrumney, Cardiff, Wales. The Elizabethan mansion was built in 1450, rebuilt in 1852 and refurbished around 1900. Throughout its history it has been a stately home and more recently a pub. In the 1980s, the building fell into disrepair. In recent years a local businessman conducted renovation and repair work, which was completed in 2019.

== History ==
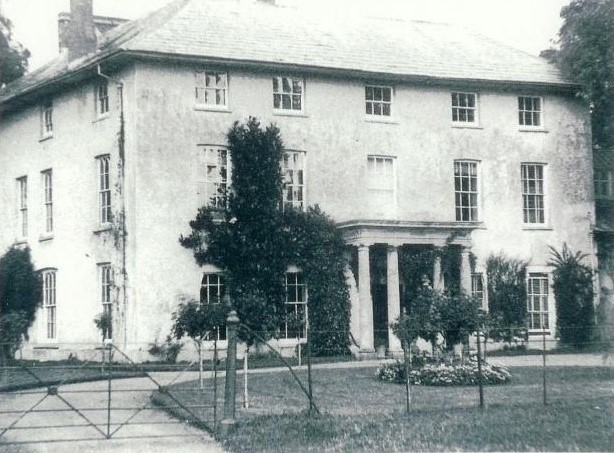
Llanrumney Hall in 1891

The area of Llanrumney was given to the monks at Keynsham Abbey, in Somerset, England, after the Norman conquest of England. They built a small chapel on the site of what is now Llanrumney Hall.

The Elizabethan-style Llanrumney Hall and its 700 acres (280 ha) estate was originally built in 1450 and is thought that it passed to the Kemys family of Cefn Mably in the mid-1500s after the dissolution of the Monasteries by Henry VIII. William Kemys left the estate to his daughter, who was married to Thomas Morgan. Llanrumney Hall has since been occupied by five generations of the Morgan family, whose ancestral home was Tredegar House in Newport. Morgan Morgan was the last in the male line and the hall and estate passed by marriage onto the Lewis family in 1726.

In the mid-19th century, the hall was occupied by Edward Augustus Freeman, the Regius Professor of History at the University of Oxford. It was purchased by Charles Crofts Williams of Roath Court in 1859, who was the hall's last recorded Lord of the Manor. Around 1900 the hall was refurbished. His family lived at the hall until the development of the surrounding housing estate, when in 1934 it was left by his nephew Charles Crofts Llewellyn Williams who died in 1952.

In 1952 the hall was compulsorily purchased by Cardiff Council and it became a remand centre. By 1956, it became a pub, but the hall fell into disrepair by the late 1980s. There was a plan developed by Cardiff Council and CMB Engineering to redevelop the hall into an education and sporting facility at a cost of about £1 million. However, this did not happen and the Llanrumney Hall Community Trust Limited was established in January 2015, since when the building has been developed into a multi-purpose community hub.

== Listing status ==
Many sources list Llanrumney Hall either as a Grade I or Grade II listed building. However the official listing by Cadw shows Llanrumney Hall PH (Public House) as Grade II*, and that it was first listed on 19 May 1975.

== Myths and legends ==
Legend has it that the hall is haunted and many local children will not go near it. It is also believed that the hall contains a masonry block with the decapitated body of Llewellyn the Last. Stories also tell of how he was beheaded at the hall and chopped into small pieces and scattered around his house.

A common local belief is that Sir Henry Morgan, after whom Captain Morgan rum is named, was born in the hall in 1635, but there is little evidence to substantiate this. Morgan was born in Rhymney, near Tredegar, in the South Wales Valleys.

== See also ==
- Listed buildings in Cardiff
