= George Richard Potter =

British historian

George Richard Potter (1900 – 1981) was a British historian. From 1931 until 1965 he was Professor of Modern/Medieval History at the University of Sheffield. He also edited the first volume of The New Cambridge Modern History.

Professor Potter received an appointment as Commander of the Most Excellent Order of the British Empire from Queen Elizabeth II during the 1977 Silver Jubilee and Birthday Honours.

== Works ==
- Sir Thomas More (1478-1538) (London: Parsons, 1925).
- Macaulay (London: Longmans, 1959).
- "Switzerland, History of" in Encyclopaedia Britannica, 15th ed., Macropædia (Chicago: Encyclopaedia Britannica, Inc., 1974).
- Zwingli (Cambridge: Cambridge University Press, 1976).
- Ulrich Zwingli (Historical Association, 1977).
- (with Mark Greengrass), John Calvin (London: Palgrave Macmillan, 1983).
