= Donald Winch =

British economist and academic

Donald N. Winch
- Born: Donald Norman Winch; 15 April 1935; London, England
- Died: 12 June 2017 (aged 82)
- Education: Sutton Grammar School
- Alma mater: London School of Economics (B.Sc.); Princeton University (Ph.D.)
- Occupation(s): Economist, academic

Donald Norman Winch, FRHistS, FBA (15 April 1935 – 12 June 2017) was a British economist and academic. He was Professor of the History of Economics at the University of Sussex from 1969 to 2000, and its Pro-Vice-Chancellor (Arts and Social Studies) from 1986 to 1989.

== Early life and education ==
Winch was born on 15 April 1935 to Sidney and Iris Winch. He was educated at Sutton Grammar School, an all-boys state grammar school in London. Having received state scholarship, he studied economics at the London School of Economics, University of London, and graduated with a Bachelor of Science (BSc) degree in 1956. He received a scholarship to pursue graduate studies at Princeton University, where he received a Ph.D. in economics in 1960 after completing a doctoral dissertation titled "The political economy of colonization: a study in the development of the attitude of the English classical school to Empire."

In 1981, he was one of the 364 economists who signed a letter to The Times condemning Geoffrey Howe's 1981 Budget.

== Academic career ==
After teaching at the University of California (1959 to 1960), and at the University of Edinburgh (1960 to 1963), Winch joined the University of Sussex. He was a lecturer in economics from 1963 to 1966, Reader in Economics from 1966 to 1969, and Professor of the History of Economics from 1969 to 2000. He also served as Dean of the School of Social Sciences from 1968 to 1974, and Pro-Vice-Chancellor (Arts and Social Studies) from 1986 to 1989. He retired from full-time academia in 2000, and was appointed professor emeritus.

== Later life ==
Winch died on 12 June 2017, aged 82.

== Honours ==
In 1986, Winch was elected a Fellow of the British Academy (FBA). He was also an elected Fellow of the Royal Historical Society (FRHistS).

== Selected works ==
- Winch, Donald (1969). Economics and Policy: A Historical Study. London: Hodder and Stoughton. ISBN 9780340109724.
- Howson, Susan; Winch, Donald (1977). The Economic Advisory Council, 1930–1939: A Study in Economic Advice during Depression and Recovery. Cambridge: Cambridge University Press. ISBN 978-0521211383.
- Winch, Donald (1978). Adam Smith's politics: an essay in historiographic revision. Cambridge: Cambridge University Press. ISBN 978-0521218276.
- Collini, Stefan; Winch, Donald; Burrow, John (1983). That Noble Science of Politics: A Study in Nineteenth-Century Intellectual History. Cambridge: Cambridge University Press. ISBN 978-0521257626.
- Winch, Donald (1987). Malthus. Oxford: Oxford University Press. ISBN 978-0192876539.
- Winch, Donald (1996). Riches and Poverty: An Intellectual History of Political Economy in Britain, 1750–1834. Cambridge: Cambridge University Press. ISBN 978-0521551052.
- Winch, Donald (2009). Wealth and life: essays on the intellectual history of political economy in Britain, 1848–1914. Cambridge: Cambridge University Press. ISBN 978-0521887533.
- Winch, Donald (2013). Malthus: a very short introduction. Oxford: Oxford University Press. ISBN 978-0199670413.
