= Whig history =

Approach to historiography

Whig history (or Whig historiography) is an approach to historiography that presents history as a journey from an oppressive and benighted past to a "glorious present". The present described is generally one with modern forms of liberal democracy and constitutional monarchy: it was originally a term for the metanarratives praising Britain's adoption of constitutional monarchy and the historical development of the Westminster system. The term has also been applied widely in historical disciplines outside of British history (e.g. in the history of science) to describe "any subjection of history to what is essentially a teleological view of the historical process". When the term is used in contexts other than British history, "whig history" (lowercase) is preferred.

In the British context, whig historians emphasize the rise of constitutional government, personal freedoms and scientific progress. The term is often applied generally (and pejoratively) to histories that present the past as the inexorable march of progress towards enlightenment. The term is also used extensively in the history of science to refer to historiography that focuses on the successful chains of hypotheses and experiments that led to present-day theories, while ignoring rejected hypotheses and dead ends. Whig history laid the groundwork for modernization theory and the resulting deployment of development aid around the world after World War II, which has sometimes been criticized as destructive to its recipients.

== Terminology ==
The British historian Herbert Butterfield used the term "Whig history" in his short but influential book The Whig Interpretation of History (1931). It takes its name from the British Whigs, advocates of the power of Parliament, who opposed the Tories, advocates of the power of the king.

Butterfield's usage of the term was not in relation to the British or American Whig parties or Whiggism, but rather took aim at "the nineteenth-century school of historiography that praised all progress and habitually associated Protestantism with liberal views of liberty". The terms "whig" and "whiggish" are now used broadly, becoming "universal descriptors for all progressive narratives".

When H. A. L. Fisher gave a Raleigh lecture in 1928, he implied that the "whig historians" really were Whigs (i.e. associated with the Whig party or its Liberal successor) and had written centrist histories that were "good history despite their enthusiasm for Gladstonian or Liberal Unionist causes"; on introduction the term was mostly approbatory, unlike Butterfield's later use, since Fisher applauded Macaulay's "instructive and illuminating" history. By the time Butterfield wrote his Whig Interpretation, he may have been beating a dead horse: P. B. M. Blaas, in his 1978 book Continuity and Anachronism, argued that whig history itself had lost all vitality by 1914. Subsequent generations of academic historians have rejected Whig history because of its presentist and teleological assumption that history is driving toward some sort of goal.

=== The Whig Interpretation of History ===
Butterfield's purpose with writing his 1931 book was to criticise oversimplified narratives (or "abridgements") which interpreted past events in terms of the present for the purposes of achieving "drama and apparent moral clarity". Butterfield especially noted:

It is part and parcel of the whig interpretation of history that it studies the past with reference to the present.

Butterfield argued that this approach to history compromised the work of the historian in several ways. The emphasis on the inevitability of progress leads to the mistaken belief that the progressive sequence of events becomes "a line of causation", tempting the historian to go no further to investigate the causes of historical change. The focus on the present as the goal of historical change leads the historian to a special kind of "abridgement", selecting only those events that seem important from the present point of view.

He also criticised it for modernising the past: "the result [of whig history] is that to many of us [historical figures] seem much more modern than they really were, and even when we have corrected this impression by closer study we find it difficult to keep in mind the differences between their world and ours".

Whig history is also criticised as having an overly dualist view with heroes on the side of liberty and freedom against traditionalist villains opposing the inevitability of progress. It also casts an overly negative view of opposing parties to heroes described, taking such parties "to have contributed nothing to the making of the present" and at worst converting them into a "dummy that acts as a better foil to the grand whig virtues". Butterfield illustrated this by criticising views of Martin Luther and the Reformation which "are inclined to write sometimes as though Protestantism in itself was somehow constituted to assist [the process of secularisation]" and misconceptions that the British constitution was created by Whigs opposed by Tories rather than created by compromise and interplay mediated by then-political contingencies.

He also thought that whig history viewed the world in terms of a morality play: that "[the whig historian imagines himself] inconclusive unless he can give a verdict; and studying Protestant and Catholic in the 16th century he feels that loose threads are still left hanging unless he can show which party was in the right".

Butterfield instead advances a view of history stressing the accidental and contingent nature of events rather than some kind of inevitable and structural shift. Moreover, he called upon historians "to evoke a certain sensibility towards the past, the sensibility which studies the past 'for the sake of the past', which delights in the concrete and the complex, which 'goes out to meet the past', which searches for 'unlikenesses between past and present'".

A decade later however, if under wartime pressure from the Second World War, Butterfield would note of the Whig interpretation that "whatever it may have done to our history, it has had a wonderful effect on our politics....In every Englishman there is hidden something of a whig that seems to tug at the heart-strings".

=== Subsequent views ===
Butterfield's formulation has subsequently received much attention and the kind of historical writing he argued against in generalized terms is no longer academically respectable. Despite its polemical success, Butterfield's celebrated book was criticized by David Cannadine as "slight, confused, repetitive and superficial". However, of the English tradition more broadly, Cannadine wrote:

It was fiercely partisan and righteously judgemental, dividing the personnel of the past into the good and the bad. And it did so on the basis of the marked preference for liberal and progressive causes, rather than conservative and reactionary ones ... Whig history was, in short, an extremely biased view of the past: eager to hand out moral judgements, and distorted by teleology, anachronism and present-mindedness.

E. H. Carr in What Is History? (1961) gave Butterfield's book the backhanded compliment of being "a remarkable book in many ways" noting that "though it denounced the whig interpretation over some 130 pages, it did not... name a single whig except Fox, who was no historian, or a single historian save Acton, who was no whig".

Michael Bentley analyses Butterfield's whig theory as referring to a canon of 19th-century historians in and of England (such as William Stubbs, James Anthony Froude, E. A. Freeman, J. R. Green, W. E. H. Lecky, Lord Acton, J. R. Seeley, S. R. Gardiner, C. H. Firth and J. B. Bury) that in fact excludes few except Thomas Carlyle. The theory identifies the common factors and Bentley comments:

Carlyle apart, the so-called Whigs were predominantly Christian, predominantly Anglican, thinkers for whom the Reformation supplied the critical theatre of enquiry when considering the origins of modern England. When they wrote about the history of the English constitution, as so many of them did, they approached their story from the standpoint of having Good News to relate ... If they could not have found the grandeur that they developed had they been writing half a century earlier, neither could they have supported their optimism had they lived to endure the barbarisms of the Somme and Passchendaele.

Roger Scruton takes the theory underlying whig history to be centrally concerned with social progress and reaction, with the progressives shown as victors and benefactors. According to Victor Feske, there is too much readiness to accept Butterfield's classic formulation from 1931 as definitive.

== British whig history ==
In Britain, whig history is a view of British history that sees it as a "steady evolution of British parliamentary institutions, benevolently watched over by Whig aristocrats, and steadily spreading social progress and prosperity". It described a "continuity of institutions and practices since Anglo-Saxon times that lent to English history a special pedigree, one that instilled a distinctive temper in the English nation (as whigs liked to call it) and an approach to the world [which] issued in law and lent legal precedent a role in preserving or extending the freedoms of Englishmen".

Paul Rapin de Thoyras's history of England, published in 1723, became "the classic Whig history" for the first half of the eighteenth century. Rapin claimed that the English had preserved their ancient constitution against the absolutist tendencies of the Stuarts. However, Rapin's history lost its place as the standard history of England in the late 18th century and early 19th century to that of David Hume.

According to Arthur Marwick, however, Henry Hallam was the first whig historian, publishing Constitutional History of England in 1827, which "greatly exaggerated the importance of 'parliaments' or of bodies [whig historians] thought were parliaments" while tending "to interpret all political struggles in terms of the parliamentary situation in Britain [during] the nineteenth century, in terms, that is, of Whig reformers fighting the good fight against Tory defenders of the status quo".

=== David Hume ===
In The History of England (1754–1761), Hume challenged whig views of the past and the whig historians in turn attacked Hume; but they could not dent his history. In the early 19th century, some whig historians came to incorporate Hume's views, dominant for the previous fifty years. These historians were members of the New Whigs around Charles James Fox (1749–1806) and Lord Holland (1773–1840) in opposition until 1830 and so "needed a new historical philosophy". Fox himself intended to write a history of the Glorious Revolution of 1688, but only managed the first year of James II's reign. A fragment was published in 1808. James Mackintosh then sought to write a Whig history of the Glorious Revolution, published in 1834 as the History of the Revolution in England in 1688.

=== Thomas Babington Macaulay ===
Hume still dominated English historiography, but this changed when Thomas Babington Macaulay entered the field, utilising Fox and Mackintosh's work and manuscript collections. Macaulay's History of England was published in a series of volumes from 1848 to 1855. It proved an immediate success, replacing Hume's history and becoming the new orthodoxy. As if to introduce a linear progressive view of history, the first chapter of Macaulay's History of England proposes:

The history of our country during the last hundred and sixty years is eminently the history of physical, of moral, and of intellectual improvement.

While Macaulay was a popular and celebrated historian of the whig school, his work did not feature in Butterfield's 1931 Whig Interpretation of History. According to Ernst Breisach, "his style captivated the public as did his good sense of the past and firm whiggish convictions".

=== William Stubbs ===
William Stubbs (1825–1901), the constitutional historian and influential teacher of a generation of historians, was the author of the extremely influential Constitutional History of England (published between 1873 and 1878) and became a crucial figure in the later survival and respectability of whig history. According to Reba Soffer,

Stubbs was a true believer who concealed his biases, even from himself, behind the façade of a dispassionate historian translating original documents into magisterial prose. His rhetorical gifts often obscured his combination of high church Anglicanism, whig history, and civic responsibility. In the Church of England, Stubbs saw the original model for the development and maintenance of English liberties.

Stubb's history began with an imagined Anglo-Saxon past into which representative parliamentary institutions emerged and fought for control with the absolutist crown in various stages (including overreaches during the English Civil War) before uniting in "nation, church, peers and people" in the Glorious Revolution. This view of events was substantially challenged: Maitland discovered in 1893 that the early "parliaments" had "no hint of operating as a representative body but resembled instead a meeting of the King's Council, called to meet the king's purposes; it passed no 'legislation', but rather considered petitions or 'bills' as though acting as an ultimate court of justice". Albert Pollard, writing in 1920, also shot through much of Stubbs' ideas on the representative and law-making powers of early English parliaments, pulling the emergence of a semi-independent House of Commons to the 1620s.

=== Robert Hebert Quick ===
Political history was the usual venue for whig history in Great Britain, but it also appears in other areas. Robert Hebert Quick (1831–1891) was one of the leaders of the Whig school of the history of education, along with G. A. N. Lowndes. In 1898, Quick explained the value of studying the history of educational reform, arguing that the great accomplishments of the past were cumulative and comprised the building blocks that “would raise us to a higher standing-point from which we may see much that will make the right road clearer to us”.

=== End of whig history ===
Frederic William Maitland is "now universally recognised as the first practitioner of the modern discipline of history", using "medieval law as a tool to prise open the mind of medieval men". Blaas, in Continuity and Anachronism (1978) discerns new methods in the work of J. H. Round, F. W. Maitland and A. F. Pollard; Bentley believes that their work "contained the origins of much twentieth-century [historical] thinking in England". Marwick also positively mentions Gardiner, Seeley, Lord Acton, and T. F. Tout as transforming the teaching and study of history at British universities into a recognisable modern form.

The First World War, however, did substantial damage to whig history's fundamental assumption of progress and improvement:

Accelerated by the sceptical power of a new breed of historian epitomized in the brilliance of F. W. Maitland, whiggery had begun its turn downwards (we are told) and met its Waterloo on the Somme ... [T]win thrusts—on the one hand cultural despair in face of a dead civilization, on the other a determination to make history say something different for the post-war generation—worked between them to put whig susceptibilities between a rock and a hard place.

Bentley also speculates that 19th-century British historiography took the form of an indirect social history which "attempted to embrace society by absorbing it into the history of the state", a project gravely disrupted by the First World War and renewed questions on "the pretensions of the state as an avatar of social harmony". He, however, notes that whig history has not died "outside the academy" and lives on partially in criticism of history as something published in "a row of small-minded monographs written by authors calling themselves 'doctor', whose life-experience and sense of English culture extended no further than taking cups of tea in the Institute of Historical Research".

== Later instances and criticism ==
=== In science ===
It has been argued that the history of science is "riddled with Whiggish history". Like other whig histories, whig history of science tends to divide historical actors into "good guys" who are on the side of truth (as is now known), and "bad guys" who opposed the emergence of these truths because of ignorance or bias. Science is seen as emerging from "a series of victories over pre-scientific thinking".

The writing of Whig history of science is especially found in the writings of scientists and general historians, while this whiggish tendency is commonly opposed by professional historians of science. Nicholas Jardine describes the changing attitude to whiggishness this way:

By the mid-1970s, it had become commonplace among historians of science to employ the terms "Whig" and "Whiggish", often accompanied by one or more of "hagiographic", "internalist", "triumphalist", even "positivist", to denigrate grand narratives of scientific progress. At one level there is, indeed, an obvious parallel with the attacks on Whig constitutional history in the opening decades of the century. For, as P. B. M. Blaas has shown, those earlier attacks were part and parcel of a more general onslaught in the name of an autonomous, professional and scientific history, on popular, partisan and moralising historiography. For post-WWII champions of the newly professionalized history of science the targets were quite different. Above all, they were out to establish a critical distance between the history of science and the teaching and promotion of the sciences. In particular, they were suspicious of the grand celebratory and didactic narratives of scientific discovery and progress that had proliferated in the inter-war years.

More recently, some scholars have argued that Whig history is essential to the history of science. At one level, "the very term 'the history of science' has itself profoundly Whiggish implications. One may be reasonably clear what 'science' means in the 19th century and most of the 18th century. In the 17th century 'science' has very different meaning. Chemistry, for example, was then inextricably mixed up with alchemy. Before the 17th century dissecting out such a thing as 'science' in anything like the modern sense of the term involves profound distortions." The science historians' rejection of whiggishness has been criticised by some scientists for failing to appreciate "the temporal depth of scientific research".

=== In economics ===
Retrospectives on modern macroeconomics are generally whiggish histories. For example, the popularisation of mathematical models by Paul Samuelson's Foundations of Economic Analysis, when viewed by economists trained in a mathematical framework becomes "an important milestone on the road to the mathematization of economics" in a story told by the victorious. Yet "those who do not agree that such mathematization is a good thing could argue that the mathematical developments... represent a regression rather than a progression". The introduction of rational expectations similarly carries implicit hindsight bias: people who disagree on the reality of agents making decisions in the manner assumed (e.g. behavioral economics) "would not necessarily rejoice in [rational expectations'] present ascendancy".

Burrow views Marxist history, with its "[supposed] anticipated terminus from which it derives its moral and political point", as "characteristically whig".

=== In philosophy ===
One very common example of Whig history is the work of Georg Wilhelm Friedrich Hegel, to whom is often ascribed a teleological view of history with an inexorable trajectory in the direction of progress.

Marxists have had varied views on Whig history. The traditional inheritance of Hegel, interpreted through Engels' articulation of historical materialism, implied that history progressed from a "primitive communism", through slave societies, feudal societies, capitalism, and finally to socialism and communism. However, contemporary Marxists, such as Ellen Meiksins Wood, have aggressively challenged those assumptions as deterministic and ahistorical. Walter Benjamin criticized conception of history which assumed a necessarily progressive or teleological course, though he did not employ the term "Whig history". "The danger affects both the content of the [progressive] tradition and its receivers. The same threat hangs over both: that of becoming a tool of the ruling classes. In every era the attempt must be made anew to wrest tradition away from a conformism that is about to overpower it."

=== In Canadian history ===
Regarding Canada, Allan Greer argues:

The interpretive schemes that dominated Canadian historical writing through the middle decades of the twentieth century were built on the assumption that history had a discernible direction and flow. Canada was moving towards a goal in the nineteenth century; whether this endpoint was the construction of a transcontinental, commercial, and political union, the development of parliamentary government, or the preservation and resurrection of French Canada, it was certainly a Good Thing. Thus the rebels of 1837 were quite literally on the wrong track. They lost because they had to lose; they were not simply overwhelmed by superior force, they were justly chastised by the God of History.

=== In the emergence of intelligent life ===
In The Anthropic Cosmological Principle (1986), John D. Barrow and Frank J. Tipler identify whiggishness with a teleological principle of convergence in history to liberal democracy. This is in line with what Barrow and Tipler call the "anthropic principle".

=== In general history and biography ===
James A. Hijiya points out the persistence of whiggish history in history textbooks. In the debate over Britishness, David Marquand praised the whig approach on the grounds that "ordered freedom and evolutionary progress have been among the hallmarks of modern British history, and they should command respect".

Historian Edward J. Larson in his book Summer for the Gods: The Scopes Trial and America's Continuing Debate Over Science and Religion (1997) challenged a whiggish view of the Scopes trial. The book won the Pulitzer Prize for History in 1998.

== See also ==
- The Better Angels of Our Nature
- Chronological snobbery
- Classical liberalism
- End of history
- The End of History and the Last Man
- Ethnocentrism
- Great man theory
- Meliorism
- The Moral Arc
- Moral progress
- Philosophic Whigs
- Precursorism
- Predestination
