= Tupling =

Tupling is a surname. Notable people with the surname include:

- George Henry Tupling (1883–1962), British historian
- Peter Tupling (born 1950), English golfer
- Steve Tupling (born 1964), English footballer
