= Wilfrid Jackson =

Wilfrid Jackson may refer to:

- J. Wilfrid Jackson, British conchologist, archaeologist and geologist.
- Sir Wilfrid Edward Francis Jackson, British colonial governor

== See also ==
- Wilfred Jackson, American animator, arranger, composer and director
