= Welshpool =

Town in Powys, Wales

Welshpool: Welsh: Y Trallwng
- Town
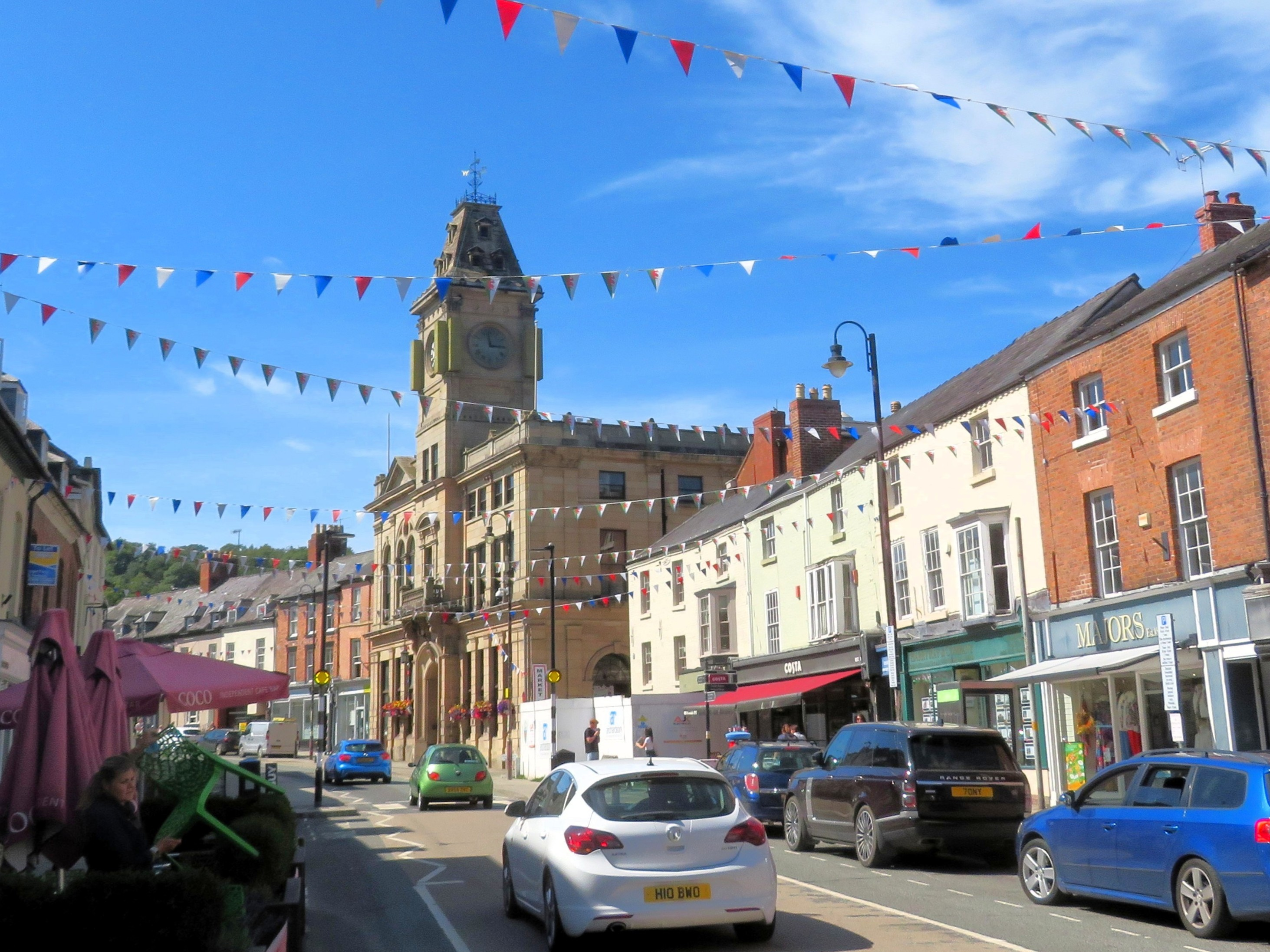
- Broad Street looking towards Welshpool Town Hall

- Location within Powys
- Area: 24.23 sq mi (62.8 km^{2})
- Population: 6,764 (Estimate)
  - Density: 279/sq mi (108/km^{2})
- Annual Population Change: 0.16%
- OS grid reference: SJ225075
  - Cardiff: 81 mi (130 km) South
- Principal area: Powys
- Preserved county: Powys
- Country: Wales
- Sovereign state: United Kingdom
- Post town: WELSHPOOL
- Postcode district: SY21
- Dialling code: 01938
- Police: Dyfed-Powys
- Fire: Mid and West Wales
- Ambulance: Welsh
- UK Parliament: Montgomeryshire and Glyndŵr
- Senedd Cymru – Welsh Parliament: Montgomeryshire
- List of places UK Wales Powys 52.65966°N 3.14725°W Community map: Map of the community

Welshpool (Welsh: Y Trallwng) is a market town and community in Powys, Wales, historically in the county of Montgomeryshire. The town is four miles (six kilometres) from the Wales–England border and low-lying on the River Severn. The community, which also includes Cloddiau and Pool Quay, has a population of 6,664 (as of the 2011 United Kingdom census), with the town having 5,948. There are many examples of Georgian architecture within the town. Powis Castle is located to the south-west.

== Toponym ==
Y Trallwng is the Welsh language name of the town. It means "the marshy or sinking land". In English it was initially known as Pool but its name was changed to Welshpool in 1835 to distinguish it from the English town of Poole in Dorset.

== History ==
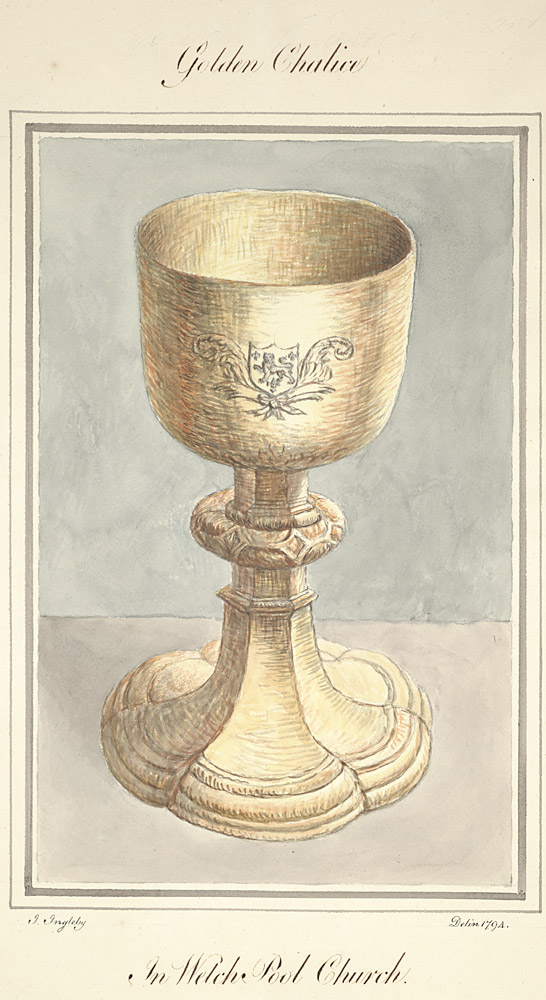
A golden chalice as seen in Welshpool Church, 1794

St Cynfelin is reputed to be the founder of two churches in the town, St Mary's and St Cynfelin's, during the Age of the Saints in the 5th and 6th centuries.

The parish of Welshpool roughly coincides with the medieval commote of Ystrad Marchell in the cantref of Ystlyg in the Kingdom of Powys.

The Long Mountain, which plays as a backdrop to most of Welshpool, once served as the ultimate grounds for defence for fortresses in the times when the town was just a swampy marsh.

Welshpool served briefly as the capital of Powys Wenwynwyn or South Powys after its prince was forced to flee the traditional Welsh royal site at Mathrafal in 1212, by the prince of Gwynedd; assistance from the English crown (enemies of the Gwynedd prince) restored the Wenwynwyn dynasty to their lands. Further disputes with Gwynedd again brought in the English; in 1284, the family strengthened their hold on Powys Wenwynwyn by converting it into a marcher lordship (via surrender and re-grant) - the Lordship of Powys. Owain, the heir to the former principality, called himself Owen de la Pole, after the town.

The town was devastated by the forces of Owain Glyndŵr (heir to Powys Fadog - North Powys) in 1400 at the start of his rebellion against the English king Henry IV. Today, the waymarked, 135-mile long-distance footpath and National Trail, Glyndŵr's Way, ends in Pont Howell Park, alongside the Montgomery Canal.

In 1411 the priest at the church St Mary's was Adam of Usk.

== Population ==
The population of Welshpool has risen since 2001.

Date	Population
2001	5,539
2011	5,948
2021	5,940

=== Villages ===
- Gungrog

== Historic buildings ==
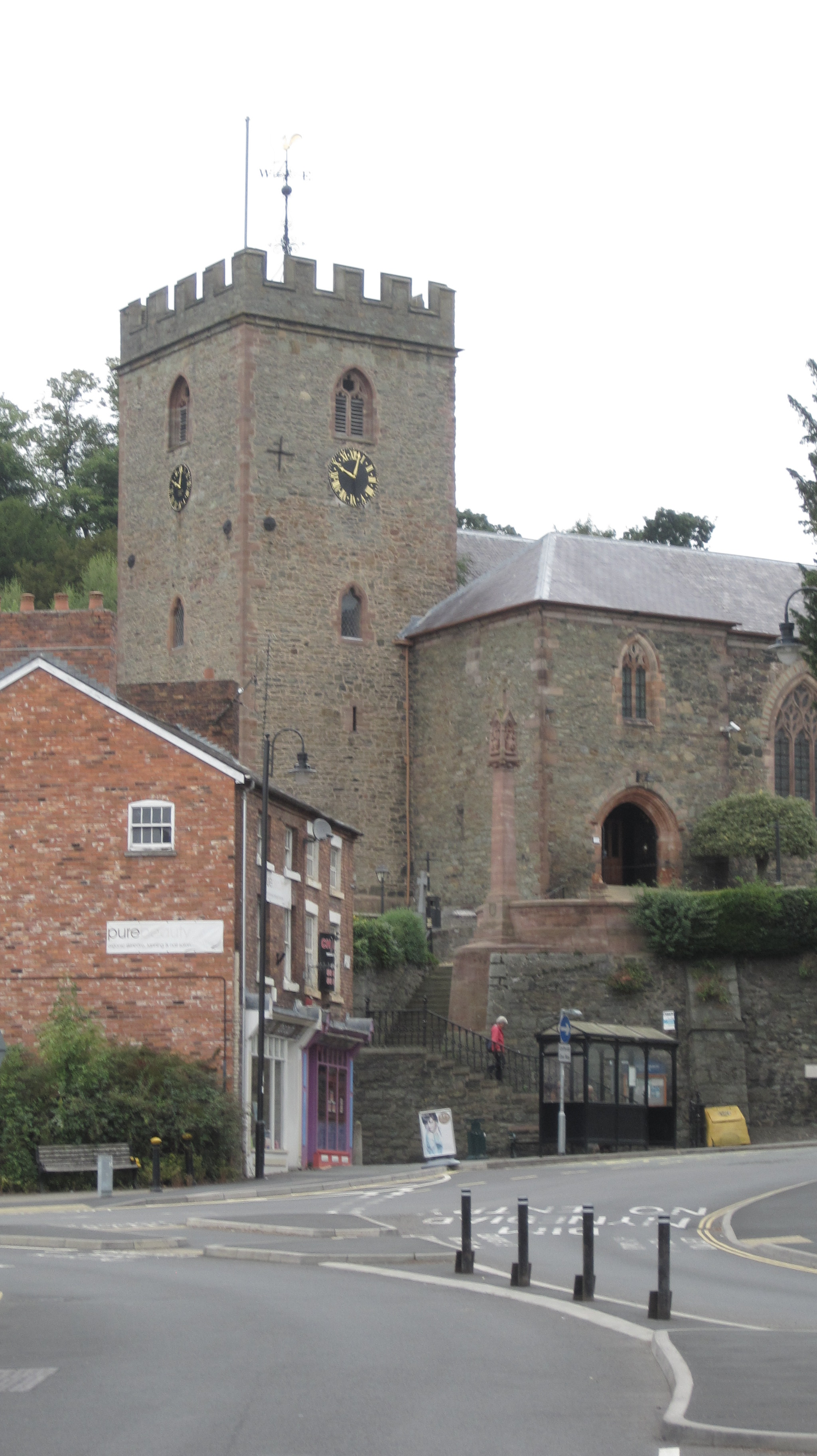
St Mary's Church, Welshpool

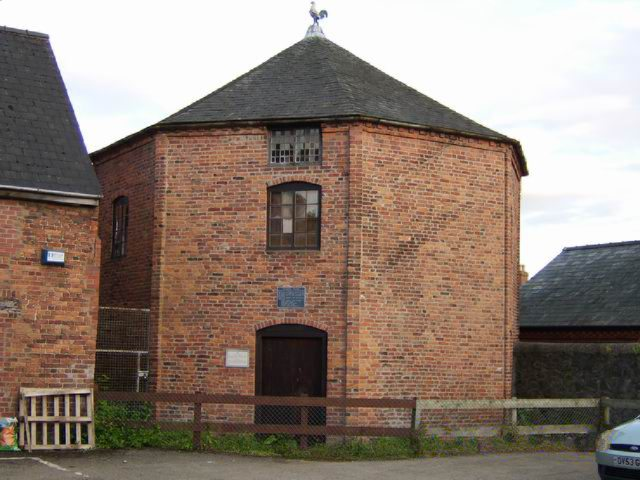
Welshpool Cockpit

St Mary's Church is a Grade I listed building. The original church dated from about 1250, there are remains of this church in the lower courses of the church tower. The nave was rebuilt in the 16th century, and the whole building was substantially restored in 1871. The 15th century chancel ceiling may have come from Strata Marcella Abbey, about five miles (eight kilometres) away, and a stone in the churchyard is said to have been part of the abbot's throne. A memorial in the church commemorates Bishop William Morgan, translator of the Bible into Welsh, who was the vicar from 1575 to 1579.

The Mermaid Inn, 28 High Street, was very probably an early 16th-century merchant's house, placed on a burgage plot between the High Street and Alfred Jones Court. The timber-framed building has long storehouse or wing to the rear. The frontage was remodelled c. 1890, by Frank H. Shayler, architect, of Shrewsbury. Early illustrations of the building show that prior to this it had a thatched roof and that the timbering was not exposed. There is a passage to side with heavy box-framing in square panels, with brick infill exposed in side elevation and in rear wing. The frontage was exposed by Shayler to show decorative timber work on the upper storey. An Inn by the 19th century when it was owned by a family named Sparrow.

There is an octagonal brick cockpit in New Street, which was built in the early 18th century and was in continual use for cockfighting until the practice was outlawed by the Cruelty to Animals Act 1849. As of 2015, it is the home of the town's Women's Institute. Welshpool Town Hall, which was completed in 1874, is a Grade II listed building.

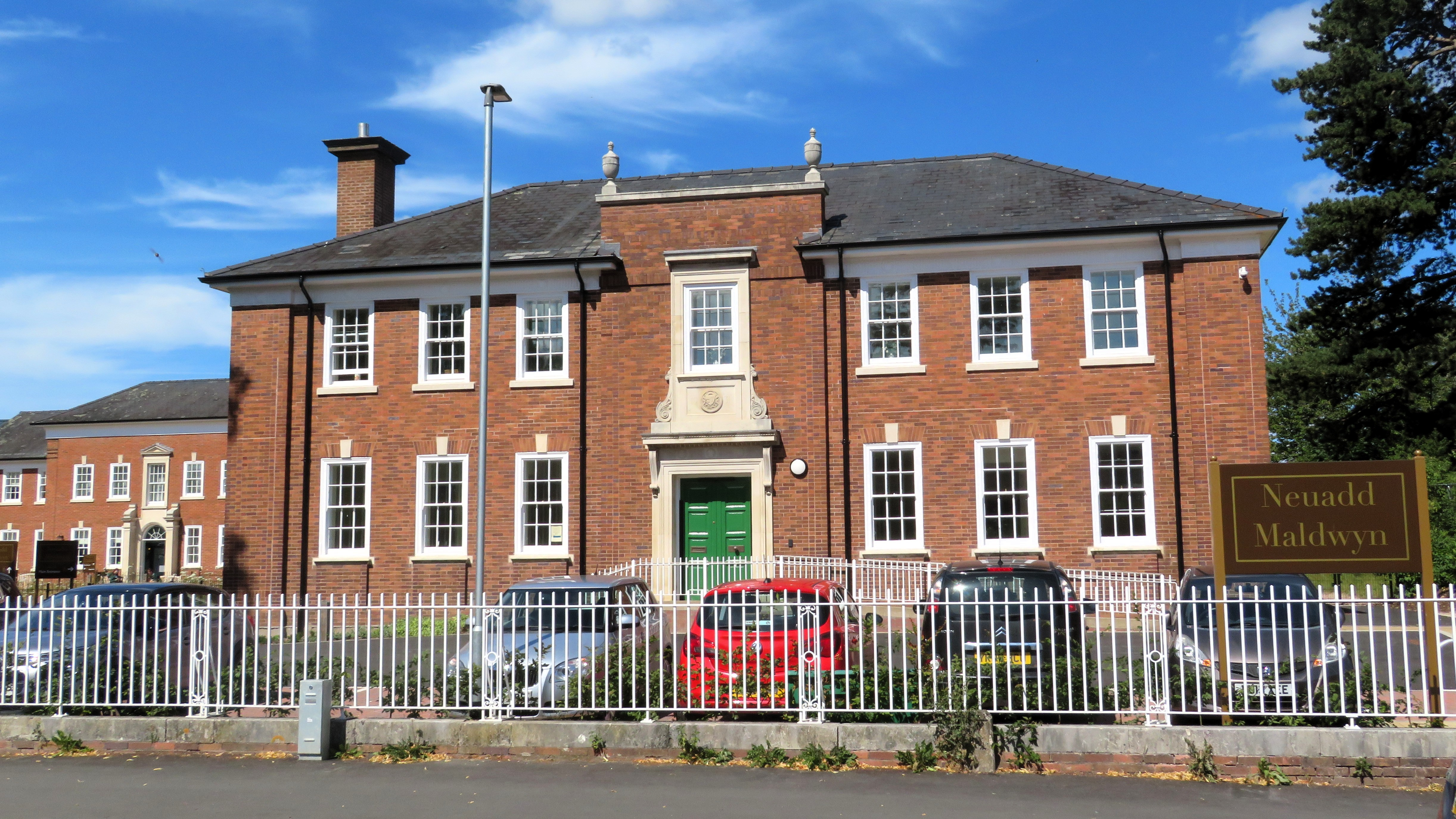
Neuadd Maldwyn, Severn Street: Built 1931 as headquarters of Montgomeryshire County Council, now an independent living scheme for older people

Neuadd Maldwyn on Severn Street was built in 1931 as the headquarters of Montgomeryshire County Council. It passed to Montgomeryshire District Council in 1974 and then Powys County Council in 1996, eventually closing as council offices in 2019. It was subsequently converted into an independent living scheme for older people, which opened in 2025.

== Governance ==
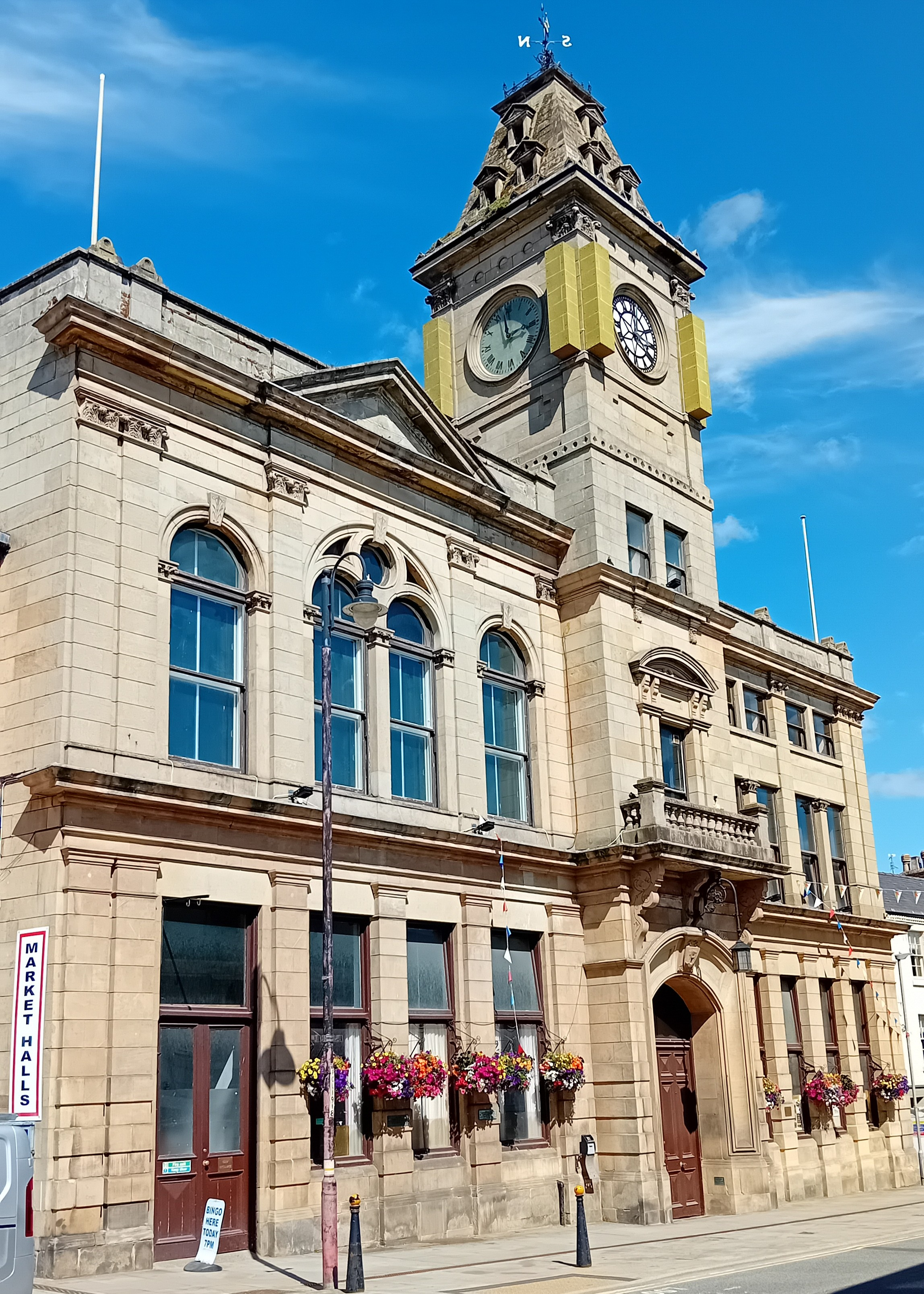
Town Hall, Broad Street, built 1874

There are two tiers of local government covering Welshpool, at community (town) and county level: Welshpool Town Council and Powys County Council. The town council meets at the Town Hall on Broad Street, built in 1874, and has its offices at the Tourist Information Centre on Vicarage Gardens.

The Town Council has 15 elected members serving five-year terms, and employs a staff of about 13. The chair of the council takes the title of mayor.

The community is represented on Powys County Council by three county councillors, each representing a ward: Welshpool Llanerchyddol, Welshpool Gungrog and Welshpool Castle.

== Transport ==
Welshpool railway station is on the Cambrian Line and is served by Transport for Wales. The town is also the starting point of the Welshpool and Llanfair Light Railway, a narrow-gauge heritage railway popular with tourists, with its terminus station at Raven Square. The light railway once ran through the town to the Cambrian Line railway station, but today Raven Square, located on the western edge of the town, is the eastern terminus of the line.

A small network of bus services link surrounding towns and villages, mainly operated by Tanat Valley Coaches. Notable is service No X77, serving Shrewsbury to the east and Newtown to the south west, also service No X76 to Oswestry via Guilsfield and Llanymynech. In addition there is a local town service operated by Owen's Coaches. The semi-disused Montgomery Canal also runs through Welshpool. To the south of the town is Welshpool Airport which is also known as the Mid Wales Airport. Three major trunk roads pass through Welshpool: the A458, A483 and the A490.

== Economy ==
The local economy is primarily based upon agriculture and local industry. The Smithfield Livestock Market is the largest one-day sheep market in Europe. Market days are on Mondays.

The town's industrial estates are home to numerous different types of small industry, ranging from metal to food production. Due to the town's small size and population the attraction of high street stores and stores that cut keys is limited, meaning that many of the residents prefer to shop in neighbouring towns like Shrewsbury. However Welshpool remains an important hub serving its agricultural hinterland. The town is home to the headquarters of the Montgomeryshire Wildlife Trust and the Clwyd-Powys Archaeological Trust.

== Education ==
The town is the home of two primary schools, Ysgol Gymraeg Y Trallwng and Welshpool Church in Wales Primary School. Welshpool High School is a secondary school which teaches a range of pupils from ages 11–18 and is currently in special measures. Welshpool High School teaches from Key Stage 3 to 5 including GCSE and A-Level through the Powys Sixth Scheme.

== Sport ==
Welshpool has a football club (Welshpool Town F.C.) and a rugby union club (Welshpool Rugby Football Club). The football club was jointly managed for a period in the late 2010s by Chris Roberts and Neil Pryce but with little success. The town also has hockey and cricket clubs. The Montgomeryshire Marauders Rugby League Club are also nominally based in Welshpool, as this is where the majority of their home fixtures take place.

== Notable people ==
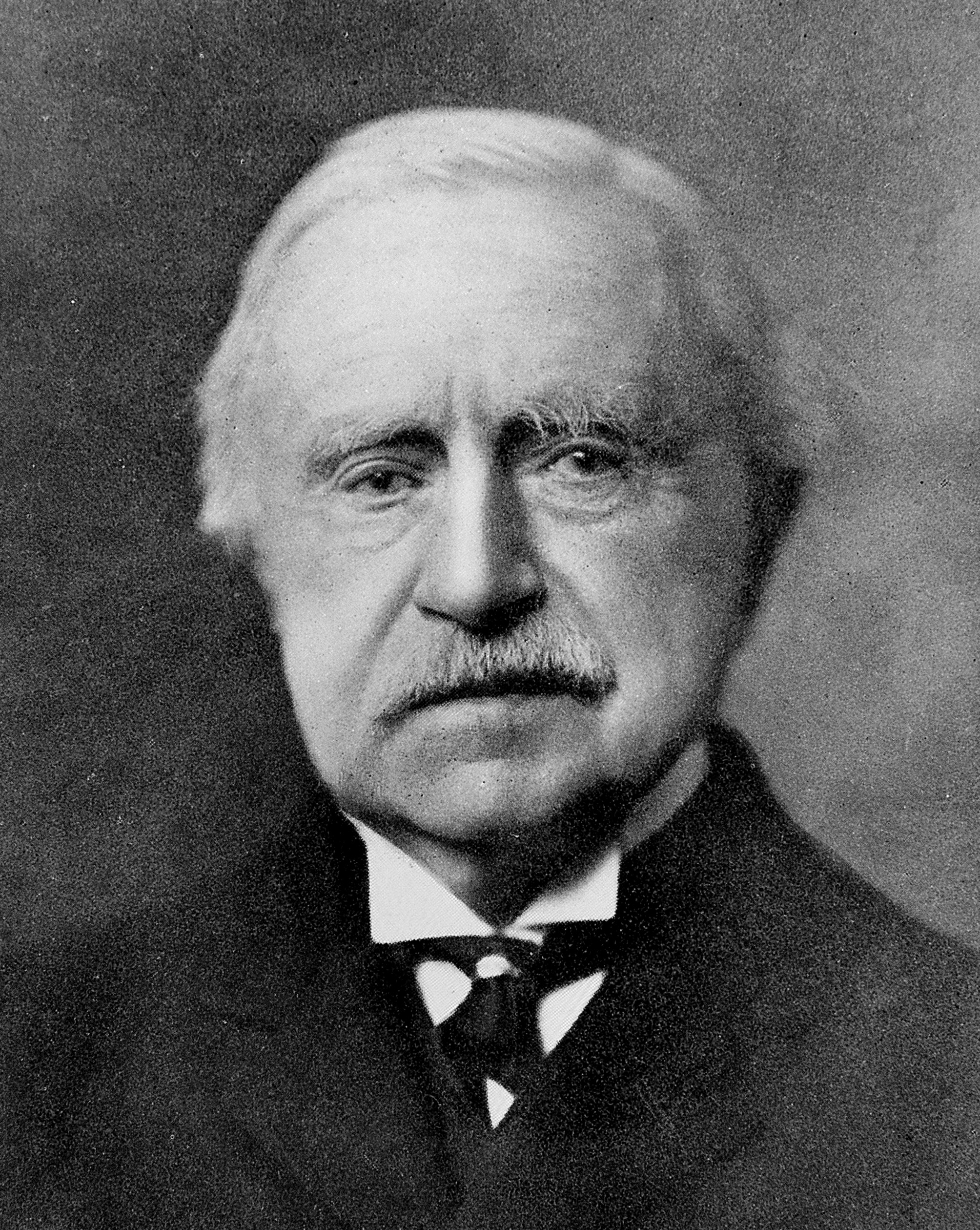
William Boyd Dawkins

- William Morgan (1545-1604), Bible translator, Vicar of Welshpool 1575–79, became Bishop of St Asaph in 1601
- Sampson Lloyd (1664–1724), iron manufacturer in early Birmingham, founder of the Lloyd family of Birmingham
- Lieutenant-General Sir Percy Egerton Herbert (1822 in Powis Castle – 1876), Army officer and politician.
- Sir William Boyd Dawkins (1837 in Buttington – 1929), geologist and archaeologist.
- William Rupert Davies (1879-1967), Canadian Senator, politician, newspaper publisher, born at Welshpool, later returned to Wales and lived latterly at Leighton Hall.
- William Herbert Waring (1885-1918), Victoria Cross recipient in World War I.
- Roderick Urwick Sayce (1890–1970), social anthropologist and geographer
- Ann Mercy Hunt (1938–2014), medical researcher and campaigner; co-founded the Tuberous Sclerosis Association
- Glyn Davies (born 1944), a former politician and MP for Montgomeryshire from 2010 to 2019.
- Michael Jones (born 28 January 1952), is a Welsh-French singer, guitarist, and songwriter who lives in France.
- Nick Griffin (born 1959), English British National Party politician and former MEP
- Jane Dodds (born 1963), politician, MP for Brecon and Radnor during 2019, previously lived in Welshpool.
- Craig Williams (born 1985), politician, MP for Cardiff North, 2015 to 2017 and for Montgomeryshire from 2019.

=== Sport ===
- Jack Roscamp (1901-1939). footballer notably for Blackburn Rovers, was a publican in his latter years when he kept The Boot Inn in the town.
- George Bennett (1913 in Forden – 1970), a rugby union and professional rugby league footballer with 383 caps
- Ian Hutchinson (born 1964), county cricketer for Middlesex and Shropshire. 27 first class caps
- Adele Nicoll (born 1996), shot-putter, discus-thrower, Olympian bobsledder.

== Gallery ==
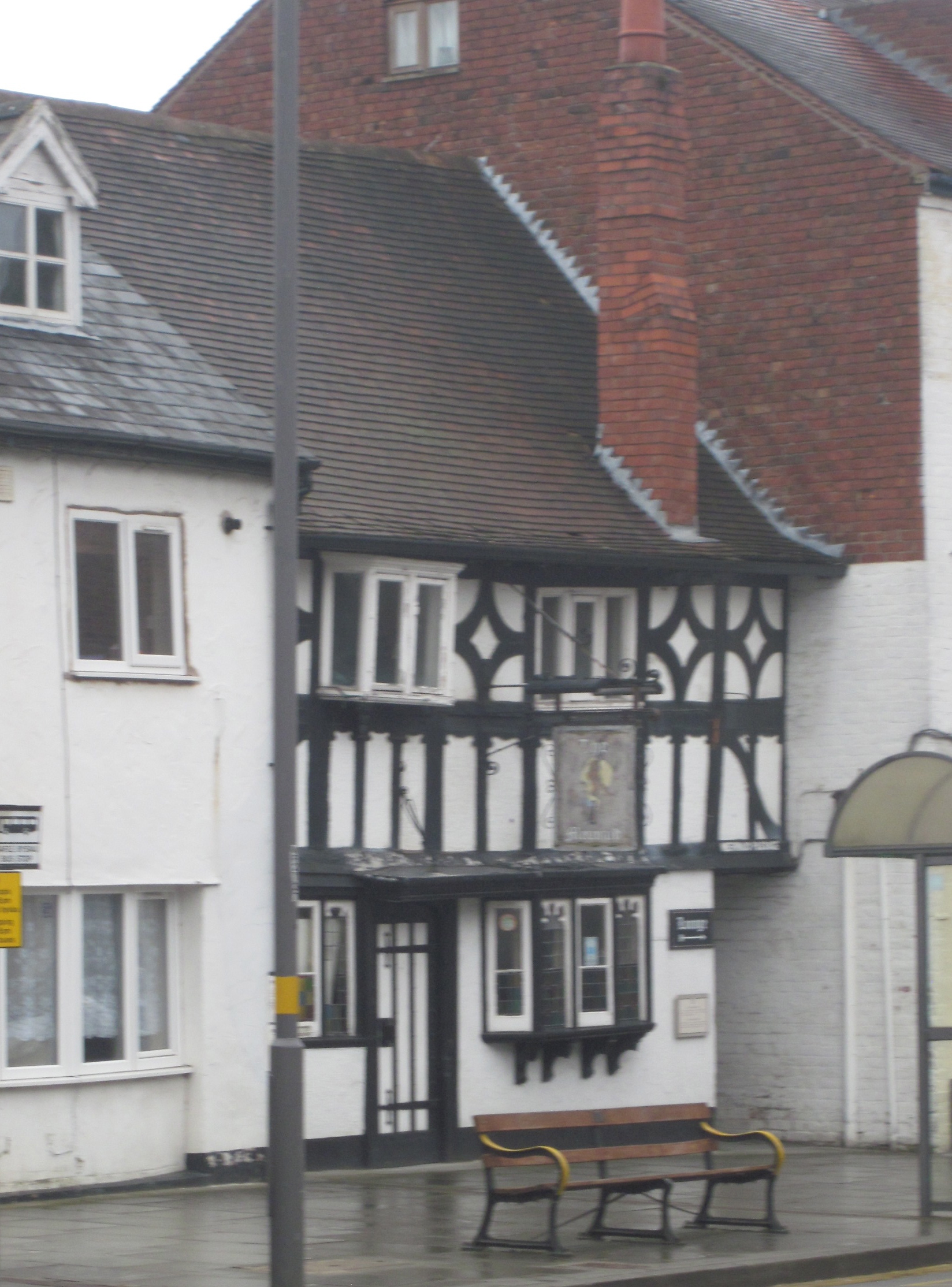
Mermaid Inn, Welshpool

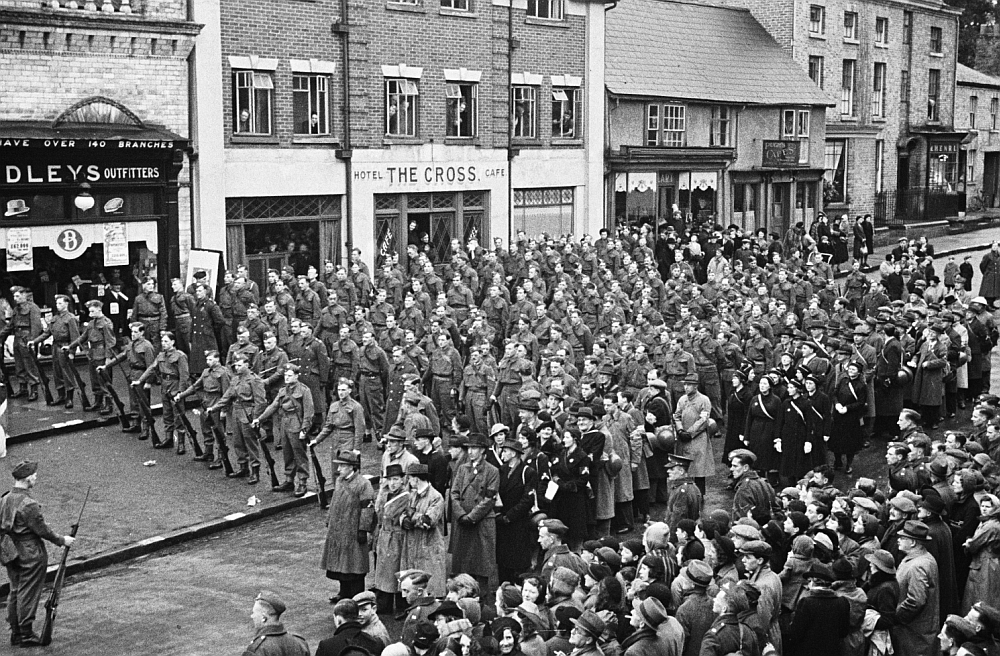
Troops in Welshpool during Montgomeryshire War Weapons Week, 1941

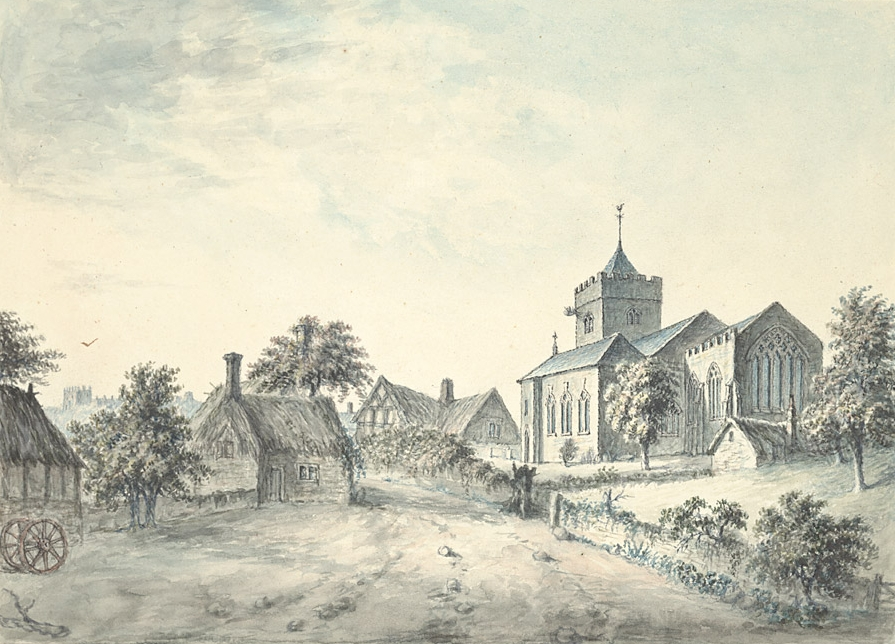
Welshpool, 1794
