= William Thompson Watkin =

English archaeologist (1836–88)

- Born: 15 October 1836; Salford, Lancashire
- Died: 23 March 1888 (aged 51); Liverpool, Lancashire
- Occupation: Archaeologist
- Relatives: Sir Edward William Watkin (cousin)

William Thompson Watkin (15 October 1836 – 23 March 1888) was a British archaeologist, interested in Roman Britain, particularly of the north of England.

== Life ==
Watkin was born in Salford in 1836, son of John Watkin (1808–48) of Salford and wife Mary Hamilton, who was born in the USA. A second cousin was the railway entrepreneur Edward Watkin. He received his education at private schools, and afterwards began a career as a merchant in Liverpool.

From early life he was greatly interested in archaeological studies. Between 1871 and 1888 he wrote 123 books and articles, dealing mostly with the Roman occupation of Britain, in the north-west and in Yorkshire and Northumbria. His most important works were Roman Lancashire (1883) and Roman Cheshire (1886), both full of careful research and accurate descriptions of objects.

From 1884 Watkin was a council member, and from 1885 honorary librarian, of the Historic Society of Lancashire and Cheshire, a Liverpool institution. He was also an active member, and served on the council, of the Lancashire and Cheshire Antiquarian Society of Manchester, from its founding in 1883 until his death.

He died in 1888 at his home in Liverpool, and was buried at Anfield Cemetery. He was three times married, and left a widow and several children.

Valuable unpublished notes on Roman remains in North Wales and in various English counties and other manuscripts were purchased by subscription after his death, and presented to Chetham's Library, Manchester.

== Selected publications ==
- Roman Lancashire. 1883.
- Roman Cheshire. 1886.
