= Randolph Osborne Douglas =

- Born: March 31, 1895; Endcliffe, Sheffield, England
- Died: December 5, 1956 (aged 61)
- Other names: The Great Randini
- Occupations: Silversmith; artist; escapologist
- Known for: Devising tricks for Harry Houdini, creating The Douglas Museum - House of Wonders
- Spouse: Harriet "Hetty" Bown (m. 1926)

Randolph Osborne Douglas (31 March 1895 – 5 December 1956) was a British silversmith, artist and amateur escapologist, who worked under the stage name 'The Great Randini'. Douglas is said to have devised tricks for Harry Houdini. He later created a museum of curios in Castleton in Derbyshire.

== Biography ==
Douglas was born in 1895 and raised in Endcliffe near Sheffield. He purchased locks and a straitjacket as a boy to emulate Houdini's work. Douglas had first seen the escapologist and magician at the Sheffield Empire Theatre and they first met whilst Douglas was still a teenager.

Letters from their frequent correspondence via The Magic Circle in London kept among Douglas's belongings at the Buxton Museum, show that Douglas had many ideas for new illusions and novel stage designs. Houdini's biographer William Kalush wrote in 2006 that Douglas' upside-down escape idea changed the course of magic's history. The novel escape strategy might involve building on Houdini's well-known escape from a straitjacket. A sizable crowd gathered to watch this performance outside.

The idea was born on one of Houdini's visits to the Douglas family home when he was playing The Empire Theatre in Sheffield. According to Douglas's stepmother, Douglas demonstrated the idea of being suspended upside down in locks, chains and a straitjacket. Douglas, who had been an amateur locksmith, showed how to free oneself from the restraints. His stepmother said "Due to ill health, made worse by soldier training during World War I, Randolph's escapologist dreams were cut short. He was discharged from the army unfit for duty and began concentrating on making amazing miniature models and locks, including a padlock made from bullet cases and his army cap badge."

Douglas collected mineral specimens, native spears and locksmith paraphernalia and then moved south to the Derbyshire village of Castleton. Here he turned half of a cottage into a home for himself and his wife Hetty (Harriet, née Bown, whom he had married in 1926). The remaining half of the cottage was a showcase for his collection. The Douglas Museum - House of Wonders opened at Easter 1926 and visitors were shown around by torchlight for a small fee. Randolph also created tiny models which were on display there. These included the Lord's Prayer written on thread that would pass through the eye of a needle, a working motor that would fit under a thimble, and a greenhouse, complete with potted plants, that would fit on a thumbnail.

Other items on show were his locks, some locks given to Randolph by Houdini, and also a photograph of himself and Houdini standing side by side outside the Empire Theatre in Sheffield in 1920.

After Randolph's death in 1956, the museum was run by Hetty until her own death in 1978. The collection is now looked after by Buxton Museum and Art Gallery, in Derbyshire, and is often brought out for display.

The Randolph collection of locks and keys have been selected by Buxton Museum as their contribution to the BBC's A History of the World in 100 Objects.
