= Charles Tallent-Bateman =

British solicitor and antiquary (1852–1927)

C. T. Tallent-Bateman
- Born: 29 April 1852; Old Trafford, Manchester, England
- Died: 16 January 1927 (aged 74); Chapel-en-le-Frith, Derbyshire, England
- Education: Owens College, Manchester
- Occupations: solicitor; antiquary; poet; activist; bibliophile
- Children: 4
- Relatives: John Frederic La Trobe Bateman (cousin)

Charles Tallent Tallent-Bateman (29 April 1852 – 16 January 1927) was a British solicitor, poet, bibliophile, antiquary and campaigner for public rights of way and founder and Chairman of the Peak District and Northern Counties' Footpaths Preservation Society.

== Early life ==
Charles Tallent Bateman was the son of Ignatius W. Bateman and Elizabeth Bateman. The family was of Moravian faith, which derived from his ancestor, John Bateman (1772–1851) and his wife, Mary Agnes, daughter of the Moravian missionary Benjamin La Trobe of Ashton-under-Lyne, Lancashire. Charles was a cousin of the civil engineer John Frederic La Trobe Bateman.

== Career ==
Bateman was educated at Pannal College in Harrogate, the Pension Morave and Cantonal College in Switzerland and Owens College, Manchester. He became a solicitor with a firm in Bedfordshire, and settled in Manchester in 1882. As a solicitor, his specialisation was in the study of private legal evidence, such as deeds, of which he was said to have compiled a large collection. He was also an avid bibliophile and book collector. He became involved in the campaign to secure a public right of way over Kinder Scout in the Peak District and was instrumental in the formation of the "Peak District and Northern Counties' Footpaths Preservation Society" (later the Peak and Northern Footpaths Society) in 1894, serving as Chairman and later Honorary Solicitor.

Bateman was a gifted literary recitor, teacher of elocution and also published papers on legal, literary, and artistic subjects. He was a member of the Manchester Literary Club (from 1883) and served as its President. He was a member of the Manchester Association of Elocutionists, also serving as President. He was a Member of the Manchester Shakespeare Society, the Parliamentary Debating Societies of Manchester and Stretford, Manchester Grand Lodge of Freemasons, and was involved with the Manchester Young Men's Christian Association. He was a founder Member of the Lancashire and Cheshire Antiquarian Society (1883), serving as Council Member from 1886, President in 1916–17, Vice-President from 1917 and was elected an Honorary Member for his service to the society. He died at Chapel-en-le-Frith in Derbyshire in 1927, aged 74, leaving a widow and four daughters.

== Selected bibliography ==
- A Home Historical: Moor Park, Surrey. Manchester, 1885. ISBN 978-1247195018.
- "Coldhouse Chapel, Shudehill, Manchester", Transactions of the Lancashire and Cheshire Antiquarian Society, 8 (1890), 129–34.
- "Booth Hall, Blackley", Transactions of the Lancashire and Cheshire Antiquarian Society, 8 (1890), 176–9.
- "The Alexander Family of Manchester", Transactions of the Lancashire and Cheshire Antiquarian Society, 10 (1892), 139–41.
- "Manchester Streets",Transactions of the Lancashire and Cheshire Antiquarian Society.
- "Small Tithes in Manchester", Transactions of the Lancashire and Cheshire Antiquarian Society.
- "Humphrey Oldfield, a Salford benefactor", Transactions of the Lancashire and Cheshire Antiquarian Society.
- "Legal Documents of Title", Transactions of the Lancashire and Cheshire Antiquarian Society.
- "Statutes Merchant and Statutes Staple, locally illustrated", Transactions of the Lancashire and Cheshire Antiquarian Society.
- "On some Lancashire and Cheshire autographs", Transactions of the Lancashire and Cheshire Antiquarian Society.
- "Ancient Lancashire and Cheshire local courts of civil and criminal jurisdiction", Transactions of the Lancashire and Cheshire Antiquarian Society.
- "Notes on the ancient Court of Exchequer at Chester", Transactions of the Lancashire and Cheshire Antiquarian Society.
- "Lancastrians and Cestrians on the High Judicial Bench of England since the Conquest", Transactions of the Lancashire and Cheshire Antiquarian Society.
- "The Family of Humphrey Booth, founder of Salford Chapel", Transactions of the Lancashire and Cheshire Antiquarian Society, 27 (1909), 115–44.
- "Presidential Address: Archaic Language: Calligraphy Obsolete", Transactions of the Lancashire and Cheshire Antiquarian Society, 34 (1916), 246–8.

Professional and academic associations
Preceded by Nathan Heywood	President of Lancashire and Cheshire Antiquarian Society; 1916–17	Succeeded by Rev. Thomas Cann Hughes
