= George William Daniels =

British political economist and historian

Professor G. W. Daniels FSS
- Born: 1878; Manchester, England
- Died: 17 December 1937 (aged 58–59); Manchester, England
- Education: University of Manchester (MA M.Com)

George William Daniels FSS (1878 – 17 December 1937) was a British political economist and historian who was vice-president of the Chetham Society and President of the Manchester Statistical Society.

== Career ==
Daniels was born in Manchester and educated at the Victoria University of Manchester where he gained his Master of Arts (MA) and Master of Commerce (M.Com.) degrees and was later appointed Stanley Jeavons Professor of Political Economy. He worked with the economists John Jewkes and Harry Campion.

He was a Member of the Chetham Society serving as vice-president (1925–37) and was a Member of the Manchester Statistical Society being elected President (1930–33). He was elected a Fellow of the Royal Statistical Society in 1930. He died, aged 59 in Manchester in 1937.

== Select bibliography ==
- The Cotton Trade during the Revolutionary and Napoleonic Wars, London, 1916
- The Early Cotton Industry (with an Introduction by George Unwin), London, 1920.
- The Early English Cotton Industry, with some unpublished letters of Samuel Crompton, Manchester University Press, Manchester, 1920.
- The British Cotton Industry: Survey and Prospects, Executive Committee of London & Cambridge Economic Service, London, 1925.
- Refrigeration in the Chemical Industry, Van Nostrand, New York, 1926.
- “George Unwin (1870–1925): A Memorial Lecture”, Manchester University Lectures, No. 24, Manchester University Press, Manchester, 1926.
- The Comparative Position of the Lancashire Cotton Industry and Trade: Paper to the Manchester Statistical Society, January 12th 1927, Manchester, 1927.
- Industrial Lancashire prior and subsequent to the Invention of the Mule, Mather Lecture, Manchester, 1927.
- (with John Jewkes), The Post-War Depression in the Lancashire Cotton Industry, Bungay, Suffolk, 1928
- Capital, Labour, and the Consumer, Benn Ltd., London, 1929.
- “The Circulation of Money in relation to Production and Employment”, The Manchester School of Economic and Social Studies, 1 (1933), 15–29.
- The Relative Importance of British Export Trade, Executive Committee of London & Cambridge Economic Service, London, 1935
- (with Harry Campion) The Distribution of National Capital, Manchester University Press, Manchester, 1936.

Professional and academic associations
Preceded by Sir Kenneth D. Stewart KBE	President of the Manchester Statistical Society; 1930–33	Succeeded by David Lindsay, 27th Earl of Crawford
Preceded by William Ecroyd Farrer	Vice-President of the Chetham Society; 1925–37	Succeeded by George Henry Tupling
