= Gungrog =

Coordinates: 52.66972°N 3.138195°W

- Location within Powys
- Principal area: Powys
- Preserved county: Powys
- Country: Wales
- Sovereign state: United Kingdom
- Post town: Y Trallwng/Welshpool
- Dialling code: 01938
- Police: Dyfed-Powys
- Fire: Mid and West Wales
- Ambulance: Welsh
- UK Parliament: Montgomeryshire

Gungrog is a geographical area which is part of Welshpool (English) Y Trallwng (Welsh), Powys in Wales. It is a stretch of elevated ground which includes residential development but which also has significant areas of agricultural land. The area runs north to south on the western side of Welshpool.

Gungrog is part of the town of Welshpool and is an electoral ward for the Town Council.

It is mentioned in the Welsh Medieval tale "Breuddwyd Rhonabwy" as being the place where the fictional character Rhonabwy, has a dream which depicts an encounter with King Arthur who is about to do battle with the Saxons is set.

Known as The Dream of Rhonabwy in English it is part of the collection of Welsh Medieval tales known as the Mabinogi or Mabinogion. These date from between the 11th and 14th centuries.
