= Welshpool Town Hall =

Municipal Building in Welshpool, Wales

- Neuadd y Dref Y Trallwng (Welsh)
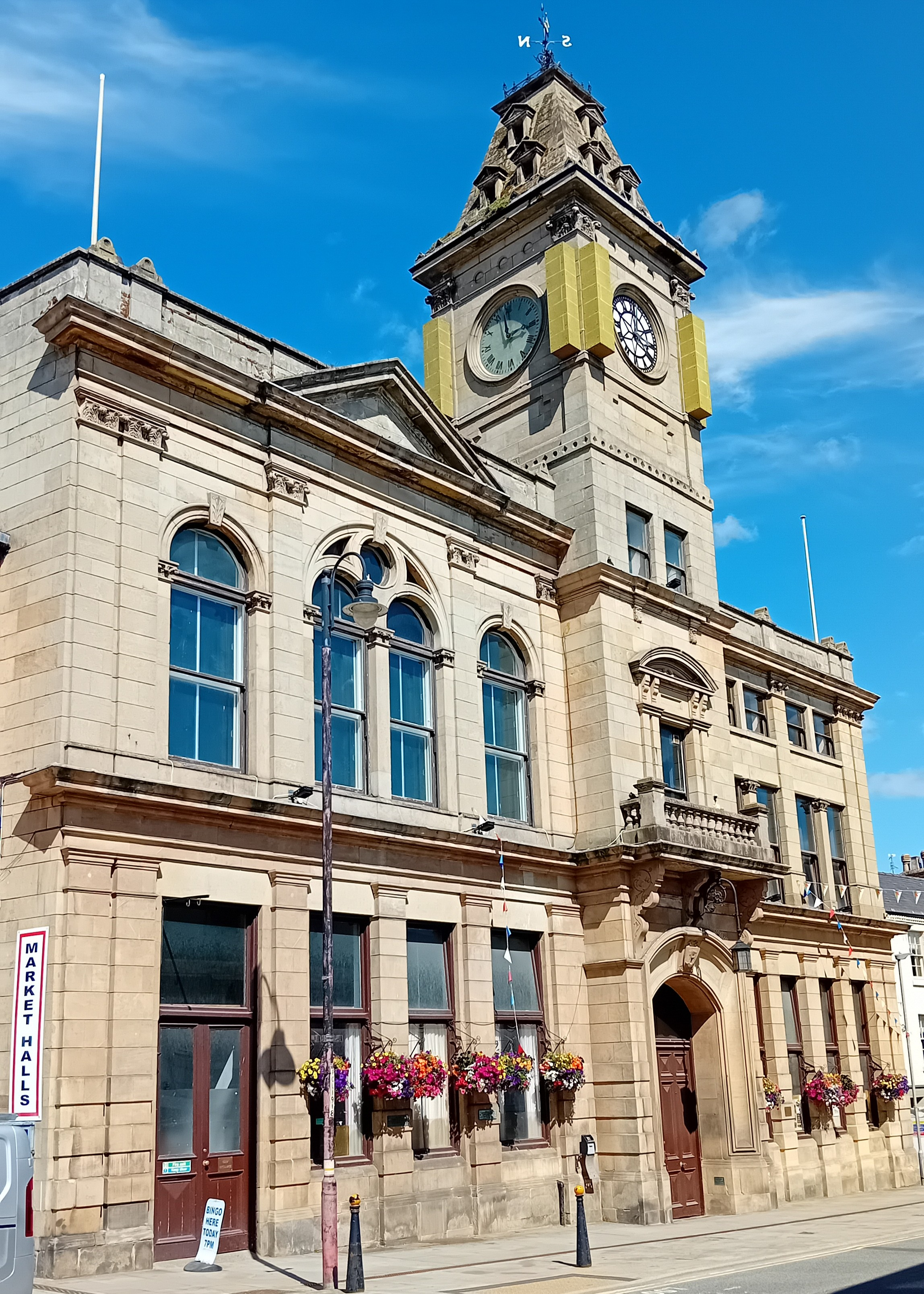
- Welshpool Town Hall

- Shown in Powys
- 52.6606°N 3.1488°W
- Location: Broad Street, Welshpool

History
- Built: 1874

Site notes
- Architect: Benjamin Lay
- Architectural style: Neoclassical style

Listed Building – Grade II
- Official name: Town Hall
- Designated: 20 October 1994
- Reference no.: 14930

Welshpool Town Hall (Welsh: Neuadd y Dref Y Trallwng) is a municipal building in Broad Street, Welshpool, Powys, Wales. The structure, which is the meeting place of Welshpool Town Council, is a Grade II listed building.

== History ==
The first municipal building on the site was a guildhall which dated back at least to 1629. The markets were relocated into this building in 1761 and the theologian, John Wesley, was refused access by the bailiff when he attempted to preach there in 1769. The building was rebuilt to a design by Simpson and Hazeldine of Shrewsbury between 1795 and 1804 and extended in 1815. It was the venue for the trial of 33 people who had taken part in the Chartist riots in Llanidloes in 1839. However, by the 1860s, the borough council decided it was too small and it was demolished.

The foundation stone for the current structure was laid by Edward Herbert, 3rd Earl of Powis on 15 September 1873. It was designed by a local architect, Benjamin Lay, in the neoclassical style, built in ashlar stone at a cost of £6,000 and was completed in 1874. The design involved a near symmetrical main frontage with eight bays facing onto Broad Street. The central bay, which slightly projected forward, took the form of a four-stage tower with a segmental doorway with an architrave and a keystone in the first stage, a stone balcony and a segmentally pedimented French door in the second stage, a pair of sash windows in the third stage, and a set of clock faces in the fourth stage all surmounted by a pyramid-shaped roof with a weather vane. The tower was 90 feet (27 m) high. The left hand section of three bays featured a doorway and three sash windows flanked by pilasters; on the first floor, there was a Renaissance style two-light window with an oculus, flanked by two round headed windows. The right-hand section of four bays, which had plainer detailing, was fenestrated by sash windows separated by pilasters on both floors. At roof level, the building was surmounted by a parapet, which was broken by a central pediment above the left-hand section. Internally, the principal rooms were the corn exchange on the left-hand side and the market hall behind it on the ground floor; on the first floor, there was a courtroom on the left-hand side and a council chamber on the right-hand side.

In 1922, excavations in the town hall sewers revealed silver coins from the time of the Roman leaders Mark Antony and Septimius Severus. The building continued to serve as the meeting place of Welshpool Borough Council for much of the 20th century but ceased to be the local seat of government when the enlarged Montgomeryshire District Council was formed in 1974. Instead it became the meeting place of Welshpool Town Council. In February 1983, a debate took place in the town hall on unilaterial nuclear disarmament at which speakers included the former First Sea Lord, Admiral Sir Michael Pollock.

The town hall was the venue for a wrestling match between the former member of parliament, Lembit Öpik, and the professional wrestler, Kade Callous, in which Öpik got hurt, in June 2012. An extensive programme of refurbishment works, which included the re-construction of the parapet and the restoration of the clock, was completed at a cost of £200,000 in late 2012. A stone to commemorate the life of locally-born soldier, Sergeant William Herbert Waring of the Royal Welch Fusiliers, who was awarded the Victoria Cross for his actions at Ronssoy in France in September 1918 during the First World War, was installed in the wall of the town hall and unveiled in January 2015.

Works of art in the town hall include a portrait by Heinrich von Angeli of Queen Victoria, a copy of a portrait by Paul Delaroche of Napoleon at Fontainebleau and a series of seascapes in the style of J. M. W. Turner.
