= Charles Roeder =

British folklorist and oral historian (1848–1911)

Carl Roeder
- Born: 1848; Gera, Thuringia, Germany
- Died: 9 September 1911 (aged 62–63)
- Occupations: Archaeologist; Antiquary

Carl "Charles" Roeder (1848 – 9 September 1911) was a German-born British amateur archaeologist, antiquarian, folklorist, philologist, and naturalist, who published his work under the name "Charles Roeder".

Born in Gera, Thuringia, Germany, Carl Roeder immigrated to Manchester, UK from Germany when he was twenty-one years old. He became a clerk in a shipping warehouse and eventually started his own business in Manchester. He devoted his leisure to study of archaeology, folklore, philology, history, geology, and botany. He published articles on his archaeological work concerning Roman Britain in the Transactions of the Lancashire and Cheshire Antiquarian Society. He became in 1887 a member of that society and in 1904 was elected an honorary member.

From 1897 to 1900 Roeder carried out important, pioneering excavations of Roman artifacts from the Castlefied area of Manchester. He reported on his work in his book Roman Manchester (1900).

Roeder wrote and did research on the archaeology, literature, folklore of Lancashire, Cheshire, and the Isle of Man, as well as the Celtic philology of the Isle of Man. He frequently contributed to the newspaper Isle of Man Examiner. He wrote an introduction to a collection of Edward Faragher's poems and folk tales and edited Faragher's Manx translation of Aesop Fables.

== Selected publications ==
- "On some newly discovered species in the Upper Permian deposits of Manchester". Transactions of the Manchester Geological Society. 20: 535–537. 1890.
- "William Green, the Lake artist (1760–1823): a biographical sketch". Transactions of the Antiquarian Society of Lancashire and Cheshire. 14: 100–130. 1896.
- "Folklore of the South of the Isle of Man". Yn Liocr Manninagh. 3: 129–190. 1896.
- Roman Manchester. R. Gill. 1900.
- "Prehistoric and subsequent mining at Alderley Edge, with a sketch of the archæological features of the neighbourhood". Transactions of the Antiquarian Society of Lancashire and Cheshire. 19: 77–118. 1901.
- "Notes on food and drink in Lancashire and other northern counties". Transactions of the Antiquarian Society of Lancashire and Cheshire. 20: 41–104. 1902.
- "Rise and growth of Blackpool (1592–1792)". Transactions of the Historic Society of Lancashire and Cheshire. 54: 1–18. 1902.
- "Maps and views of Manchester". Transactions of the Antiquarian Society of Lancashire and Cheshire. 21: 153–171. 1903.
- "Beginnings of Manchester". Transactions of the Lancashire and Cheshire Antiquarian Society. 23: 73–85. 1905.
- "Some Moston Folk-lore". Transactions of the Lancashire and Cheshire Antiquarian Society. 25: 65–78. 1907.
- "Kersal Moor and Kersal Cell: a sketch from neolithic days to present times". Transactions of the Lancashire and Cheshire Antiquarian Society. 25: 81–94. 1907.
