= Roderick Urwick Sayce =

British social anthropologist (1890–1970)

R. U. Sayce FRGS FRAI FMA
- Born: 1890; Welshpool, Wales
- Died: 1970 (aged 79–80); Welshpool, Wales

Academic background
- Education: University College, Aberystwyth (MA)

Academic work
- Discipline: Anthropology
- Sub-discipline: Social Anthropology
- Institutions: University College, Aberystwyth; Natal University College; University of Cambridge; Manchester Museum
- Military career
- Allegiance: United Kingdom
- Branch: British Army
- Service years: 1915–19
- Rank: Lieutenant
- Unit: South Wales Borderers

Roderick Urwick Sayce FRGS FRAI FMA (1890 – 1970) was a social anthropologist and geographer who was President of the Lancashire and Cheshire Antiquarian Society, Vice-President of the Powysland Club and Fellow of the Royal Geographical Society, Royal Anthropological Institute and Museums Association.

== Life ==
Sayce was born in Welshpool, Wales in 1890 and gained his Master of Arts (MA) with a thesis on "The hill-top camps of north Cardiganshire" at the University College, Aberystwyth. During World War I, he served as a Lieutenant in the South Wales Borderers (1915–19) and was severely wounded. Post-war he returned to Aberystwyth to teach Geography. He was Lecturer in Geology and Geography at Natal University College in the University of South Africa (1921–27) then Lecturer in Physical Anthropology and Material Culture at the University of Cambridge (1927–35) before being appointed Keeper of the Victoria Museum (Manchester Museum) at the University of Manchester. At Manchester, he was awarded an Honorary Master of Science (MSc) degree and was an Honorary Lecturer in Anthropology.

He was elected a Fellow of the Museums Association, Royal Geographical Society and Royal Anthropological Institute, and served as President of the North Western Federation of Museums and Art Galleries (1941). He was a Council Member of the British Association, Museums Association, Royal Anthropological Institute and Folklore Society, a Governor of the National Museum of Wales and an Honorary Member of the Irish Folklore Society.

He became a Member of the Powysland Club (1920) and was later Editor of their Montgomeryshire Collections (1930–66) then Vice-President (1966–70). He was also Editor of The Anthropological Journal (1934–36) and Member of the Editorial Committee of the Cambrian Archaeological Association. He was a Member of the Lancashire and Cheshire Antiquarian Society serving as Council Member (1937–70), President (1954–8) and Vice-President (1958–70). He was also a Member of the Manchester Literary and Philosophical Society from 1944.

He died in Welshpool in 1970 aged 80.

== Select bibliography ==
- Primitive arts and crafts, an introduction to the study of material culture, Cambridge University Press, Cambridge, 1933.
- A survey of Montgomeryshire folklore, Welshpool, 1940.
- The North Western Federation of Museums and Art Galleries: Presidential address: The museums and British ethnology, Manchester, 1941.
- Folk-lore and folk-culture, Manchester, 1943.
- “A survey of Montgomeryshire folklore”, Collections historical and archaeological relating to Montgomeryshire and its borders, 46, pt. 2, 183–93.
- Need years and need foods, Manchester, 1954.
- "The Otter" in Wales and North West Europe, Manchester, 1955.

Professional and academic associations
Preceded by Edmund Ogden	President of the Lancashire and Cheshire Antiquarian Society; 1954–58	Succeeded by James Alexander Petch
