= William Henry Chaloner =

British economic historian (1914–87)

Professor W. H. Chaloner
- Born: 1914
- Died: 1987 (aged 72–73); Manchester, England
- Occupations: Social and Economic Historian
- Spouse: Joan Chaloner

William Henry Chaloner (1914 – 1987) was an English social and economic historian who was Editor and Treasurer of the Chetham Society and Editor of the Lancashire and Cheshire Antiquarian Society.

== Life ==
Chaloner was Professor of Economic History at the University of Manchester.

He was involved in several societies such as the Chetham Society as Council Member (from 1953), unofficial joint Editor with J. S. Roskell (1962–87), and Treasurer (1983–4). He was also involved in the Lancashire and Cheshire Antiquarian Society as Council Member (from 1951) and Editor (1954–86). Chaloner was also a Governor of the Hulme Grammar School in Oldham. He died in 1987 aged 73. Volumes in his honour were published after his death by both the Chetham Society (Palatine Studies, 1993) and the Lancashire and Cheshire Antiquarian Society (Transactions, volume 85 in 1988).

== Select bibliography ==
- The Social and Economic Development of Crewe, 1780-1923, Manchester University Press, Manchester, 1950.
- (with Albert Edward Musson), eds, Industry and Technology, London 1963.
- People and Industries, London, 1963.
- (with R. C. Richardson), Bibliography of British Economic and Social History, Manchester University Press, Manchester, 1976.
- (with Barrie M. Ratcliffe), eds, Trade and Transport: Essays in Economic History in Honour of T. S. Willan, Manchester University Press, Manchester, 1977.
- The Coming Confrontation: Will the open society survive to 1989?, Institute of Economic Affairs, London, 1978.
- (with D. A. Farnie and W. O. Henderson), eds, Industry and Innovation: Selected Essays, London 1990.
- Palatine Studies: Chapters in the Social and Industrial History of Lancashire and Cheshire, ed. William Reginald Ward. Chetham Society, Third Series, 36 (1993). ISBN 0-94878-985-9.

Professional and academic associations
Preceded by George Henry Tupling	Editor of the Lancashire and Cheshire Antiquarian Society; 1956–86	Succeeded by Gordon Bradley Hindle
Preceded by Owen Ashmore	Treasurer of the Chetham Society; 1983–4	Succeeded by Gordon Bradley Hindle
