= Owen Ashmore =

British Archaeologist (1920-95)

Professor Owen Ashmore FSA
- Born: 1920; Cheshire
- Died: 1995 (aged 74–75)

Academic work
- Discipline: Archaeologist
- Sub-discipline: Industrial archaeology
- Institutions: University of Manchester

Owen Ashmore FSA (1920 – July 1995) was a British industrial archaeologist at the University of Manchester who was Secretary and Vice-President of the Lancashire and Cheshire Antiquarian Society, Treasurer of the Chetham Society and a Fellow of the Society of Antiquaries.

== Life ==
Ashmore was born in Cheshire in 1920, and taught and directed the Local History Diploma in the Extra Mural Department at the University of Manchester. He was a founder Member of the Manchester Industrial Archaeology Society.

He was elected membership of the Manchester Literary and Philosophical Society 1979

He was elected a Fellow of the Society of Antiquaries (FSA). He was a Member of the Lancashire and Cheshire Antiquarian Society, elected Council Member (from 1961), Secretary (1963–72) and Vice-President (1975–94). He was also a Member of the Chetham Society elected as a Council Member (from 1969) then serving as Treasurer (1972–83). He died in 1995 aged 75.

== Select bibliography ==
- “The Whalley Abbey bursar's account for 1520”, Transactions of the Historic Society of Lancashire and Cheshire, 114 (1962).
- A memoir of Robert Blincoe, by John Brown, with a brief account of the early textile industry in Derbyshire (with an Introduction by A.E. Musson), Derbyshire Archaeological Society, Duffield, 1966.
- Low Moor, Clitheroe: a nineteenth-century factory community, Lancashire and Cheshire Antiquarian Society, Manchester, 1966.
- Development of power in Britain, London, 1967.
- A guide to Whalley Abbey, Blackburn 1968.
- Baines's Lancashire: History, directory, and gazetteer, of the county palatine of Lancaster (with a new introduction by Owen Ashmore), New York; A.M. Kelley, 1968.
- The industrial archaeology of the British Isles: Lancashire, Newton Abbot, 1969.
- (with Trevor Bolton), Hugh Mason and the Oxford mills and community, Ashton-under-Lyne, Lancashire and Cheshire Antiquarian Society, Wilmslow, 1975.
- The industrial archaeology of Stockport, University of Manchester, 1975.
- Historic industries of Marple and Mellor, Workers' Educational Association, Stockport, 1977
- The industrial archaeology of north-west England, Chetham Society, Third Series, 29 (1982).

Professional and academic associations
Preceded by Alan Siddall	Treasurer of the Chetham Society; 1972–83	Succeeded by William Henry Chaloner
Preceded by Robert Norman Dore	Secretary of the Lancashire and Cheshire Antiquarian Society; 1964–72	Succeeded by Arthur Gordon Rose
