= Charles William Sutton =

British librarian and author (1848–1920)

Charles William Sutton MA
- Born: 1848
- Died: 1920 (aged 71–72)
- Occupations: Librarian; Author

Charles William Sutton (1848–1920) was a British librarian and author.

== Career ==
Sutton was a librarian of the Free Manchester Public Libraries. He was also Secretary of the Chetham Society from 1890 to 1920, Editor of the Lancashire and Cheshire Antiquarian Society from 1885 to 1920 and a Member of the Manchester Literary and Philosophical Society. from 1903.

== Writing ==
He was a contributor to the Dictionary of National Biography, creating many articles for the main work, and some for Supplement 1 and Supplement 2.

== Legacy ==
The collection of his letters "1887–1908: letters to John Brownbill and other correspondence" is held by Manchester Archives and Local Studies.

His letter to Edward Arber is in the University of Birmingham: Cadbury Research Library: Special Collections.

== Bibliography ==
- Ernest Axon Charles W. Sutton, M.A., Chief Librarian, Manchester Public Libraries, 1879–1920. An appreciation With two portraits (1921)

Professional and academic associations
Preceded by Richard Tonge	Secretary of the Chetham Society; 1890–1920	Succeeded by Ernest Broxap
Preceded by James Holme Nicholson	President of the Lancashire and Cheshire Antiquarian Society; 1899–1900	Succeeded by William Boyd Dawkins
Preceded by Joseph Heaton Stanning	Editor of the Lancashire and Cheshire Antiquarian Society; 1885–1920	Succeeded by George Pearson
