= William Herbert Waring =

Recipient of the Victoria Cross

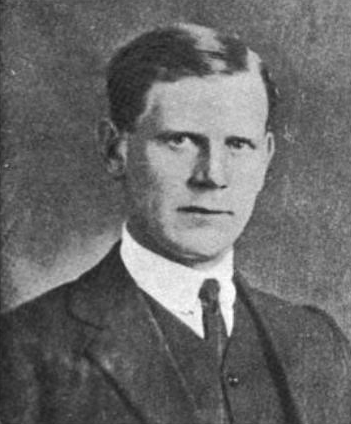
- Born: 13 October 1885; Welshpool, Montgomeryshire, Wales
- Died: 8 October 1918 (aged 32); Ronssoy, France
- Burial place: Ste Marie Communal Cemetery, Le Havre, France
- Military career
- Allegiance: United Kingdom
- Branch: British Army
- Rank: Sergeant
- Units: Royal Welsh Fusiliers
- Conflicts: First World War †
- Awards: Victoria Cross; Military Medal

William Herbert Waring VC MM (13 October 1885 – 8 October 1918) was a Welsh recipient of the Victoria Cross, the highest and most prestigious award for gallantry in the face of the enemy that can be awarded to British and Commonwealth forces.

He was born and lived in Welshpool, Montgomeryshire.

He was 32 years old, and before World War I had been a member of the part-time Montgomeryshire Yeomanry. In 1918 he was serving as a lance-sergeant in the 25th (Montgomery and Welsh Horse Yeomanry) Battalion, Royal Welch Fusiliers, British Army, when the following deed took place for which he was awarded the VC.

== Details ==
On 18 September 1918 at Ronssoy, France, Lance-Sergeant Waring led an attack against enemy machine-guns and in the face of devastating fire, single-handed rushed a strong-point, bayoneting four of the garrison and capturing twenty, with their guns. The lance-sergeant then reorganized his men, leading and inspiring them for another 400 yards when he fell mortally wounded.

Waring died 20 days later and is buried at Ste Marie Communal Cemetery, Le Havre, Seine Maritime, France.

A stone to commemorate his life was installed in the wall of the Welshpool Town Hall and unveiled in January 2015.

His Victoria Cross is displayed at the Royal Welch Fusiliers Museum, Caernarfon Castle, Gwynedd, Wales.
