= Gordon Bradley Hindle =

British archaeologist (1919–2006)

G. B. Hindle
- Born: 1919
- Died: 2006 (aged 86–87)
- Occupation: Archaeologist

Gordon Bradley Hindle (1919–2006) was a British archaeologist and historian who was Editor, President and Vice-President of the Lancashire and Cheshire Antiquarian Society and Treasurer of the Chetham Society.

== Life ==
Hindle was a Member of the Chetham Society serving as Council Member (1983–2005) and Treasurer (1984–89). He was also a Member of the Lancashire and Cheshire Antiquarian Society, serving as Council Member (1972–2005), Editor (1975–88), President (1994–97), and Vice-President (1997–2005).

== Select bibliography ==
- Provision for the Relief of the Poor in Manchester, 1754–1826, Chetham Society, Third Series, 22 (1975). ISBN 0-71901-166-3.

Professional and academic associations
Preceded by Dr Leslie Doyle	President of the Lancashire and Cheshire Antiquarian Society; 1994–7	Succeeded by Evelyn V. Vigeon
Preceded by William Henry Chaloner	Treasurer of the Chetham Society; 1984–9	Succeeded by John Leslie Ogilvie Holden
Preceded by William Henry Chaloner	Editor of the Lancashire and Cheshire Antiquarian Society; 1975–88	Succeeded by Dorothy J. Clayton
