= Buxton Museum and Art Gallery =

Museum and gallery in Buxton, Derbyshire, England

Coordinates: 53.256993°N 1.913040°W

Buxton Museum & Art Gallery
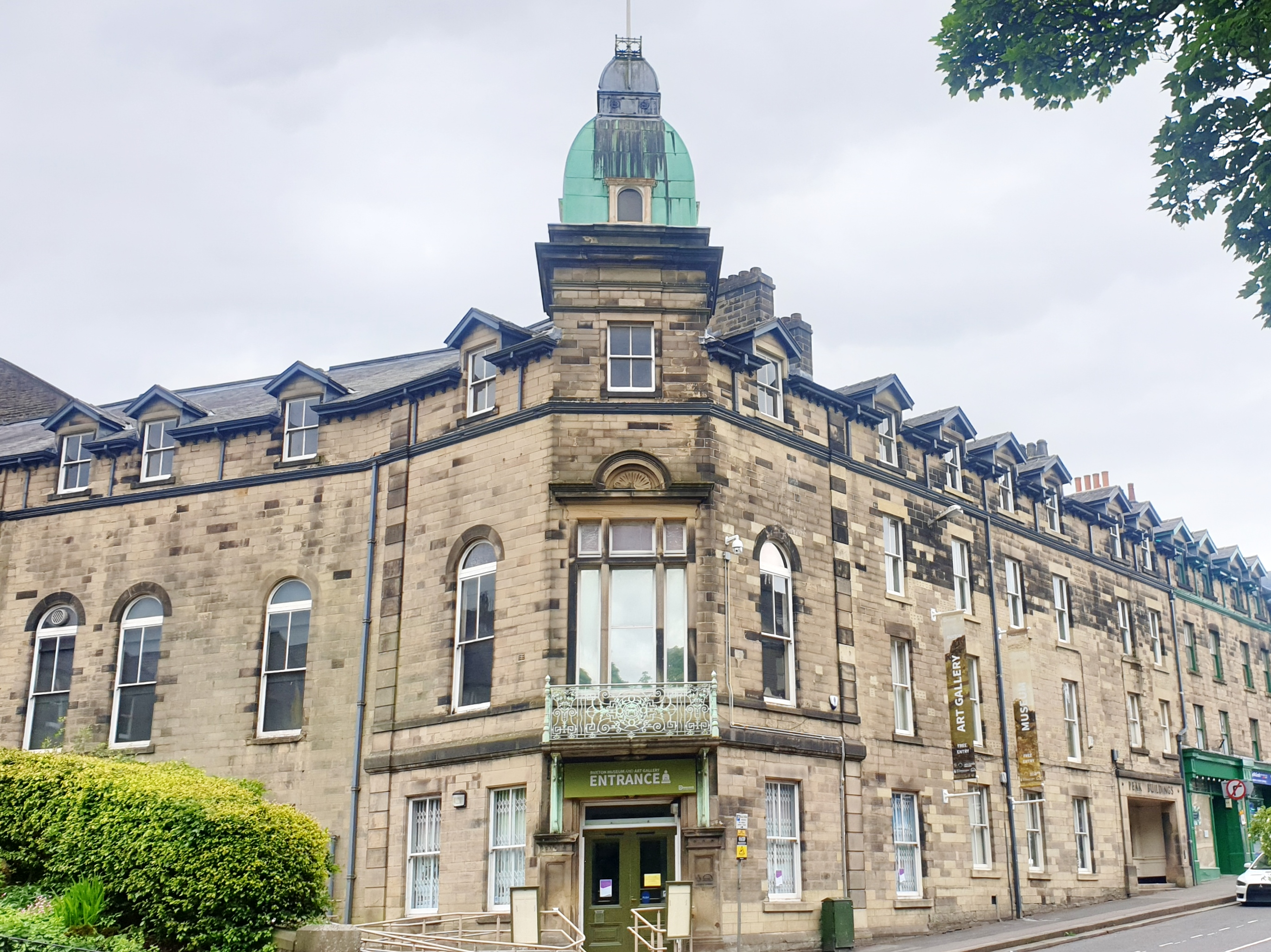
- Former name: Peak Hydropathic Hotel
- Established: 1928
- Location: Buxton, Derbyshire
- Website: Museum website

Buxton Museum and Art Gallery focuses its collection on history, geology and archaeology primarily from the Peak District and Derbyshire.

The museum was located for 95 years at Terrace Road, Buxton, England. The building was erected in 1880 and originally served as the Peak Hydropathic Hotel. During the First World War, the Red Cross used it to care for wounded Canadian soldiers. The Buxton Free Public Library & Museum moved into the building in 1928, leaving the Town Hall.

The museum closed in June 2023 after dry rot was found in structural timbers and floor joists. In May 2024 the council put the building up for sale with the stated intention of displaying the museum's collection at a new location. In January 2025 the former museum building was purchased by Solanki Holdings UK & International. As of February 2025, the museum team is based at Buxton Library where they are running an interim service.

== Permanent collections ==
The museum's permanent collections include:

- Carboniferous limestone fossil record of the Peak District collected between 1900 and 1950;
- Pliocene mammal evidence from caves and quarries throughout the Peak District;
- The archives of archaeologist Sir William Boyd Dawkins and geologist Dr John Wilfrid (J.W.) Jackson, geologists associated with the county and with Manchester Museum;
- Randolph Douglas 'House of Wonders' collection from Castleton which includes a large collection of locks and keys and some unusual Houdini material;
- A Buxton photographic collection, a collection of local social history and ephemera, and a collection of Houdini materials;
- A fine art collection dominated by 19th and 20th century works in watercolours, oils and prints, including works by Sir Frank Brangwyn, Marc Chagall and Edgar Chahine.

Amongst the minerals are Blue John, carved limestone, local specimens, and cave deposits. In 2006, Buxton Museum purchased a rare collection of decorative Ashford Black Marble wares, together with tools used to work the stone collection left by John Michael Tomlinson. Other collections relating to Derbyshire also managed from Buxton Museum and Art Gallery include a Derbyshire Police Collection.

The museum's permanent galleries include the recreated Boyd Dawkins Study and the 'Wonders of the Peak' gallery. Dawkins bequeathed to the museum a complete Victorian study containing his furniture, scientific instruments, books, Oriental ware and fossil collection. The 'Wonders of the Peak' gallery was redesigned and relaunched in September 2017. It explores Peak District history from the Lower Carboniferous to the present day. There are also two temporary exhibition galleries displaying a changing programme of work by visiting artists or drawn from the museum's own collections.

A museum project has repatriated Native American and First Nation artefacts. Items were returned to Haida Gwaii and the Siksika Nation peoples.

== See also ==
- List of museums in Derbyshire
