= J. Wilfrid Jackson =

British geologist and paleontologist (1880–1978)

John Wilfrid Jackson
- Born: 15 June 1880; Scarborough, North Yorkshire, Yorkshire
- Died: 1978 (aged 97–98)
- Occupations: Conchologist; Archaeologist; Geologist

John Wilfrid Jackson (15 June 1880 – 1978) was a British conchologist, archaeologist and geologist.

== Early life ==
Jackson was born at Scarborough, North Yorkshire to Thomas and Mary Jackson of York. The family later moved to Manchester. At age 12 he worked as office boy at the Clarion newspaper. After a year he secured a job at Ashworth & Silkstone, a cotton spinning firm. In about 1895 he was employed in the wool industry at Kolp, Kullman & Co.

== Conchology ==
Jackson's interest in conchology was encouraged by his future father-in-law, Robert Standen, an assistant keeper in the Zoology Department at Manchester Museum. After being nominated by Standen, Jackson became a member of the Conchological Society in 1901, and befriended many well-known conchologists.

Jackson continued to study conchology, and also completed certificate courses in shorthand and languages at the Lower Mosley Street Schools from 1902 to 1904. He began publishing articles in the Journal of Conchology, and in 1906 he began taking classes in geology at the Technical School.

In 1904 he was elected to the Council of the Conchological Society, and he remained an officer until 1945, serving as Secretary for almost 30 years and one year as president. He played a key role in recording the organization's history, writing many obituaries as well as biographies of both Captain Thomas Brown and Martin Lister. He wrote five papers on 'ethno-conchology', which were published in 1916 in the Memoirs and Proceedings of the Manchester Literary and Philosophical Society. These were the basis of his book, Shells as Evidence of the Migrations of Early Culture (1917, Manchester University Press).

Jackson was the author of more than 90 published works on Recent Mollusca and Recent Brachiopoda, and he published reports about material collected on the Scottish National Antarctic Expedition, the British Antarctic Expedition (Scott's 'Terra Nova'), and the Siboga Expedition.

== Cave hunting and archeology ==
In 1907, after his marriage to Robert Standen's daughter Alicia, Jackson took up a post at Manchester Museum. William Boyd Dawkins supervised his curatorial duties during his early years in this position. The pair became friends, and collaborated in mammalian osteological investigations, including the Glastonbury Lake Village excavations and cave explorations at Creswell Crags. Dawkins died in 1929.

Manchester University awarded him his M.Sc. in 1921, and D.Sc. in 1929, and he received the Murchison Award from the Geological Society of London in 1934. In 1923 he was elected to the membership of Manchester Literary and Philosophical Society as J- Wilfrid Jackson, D.Sc., F.G.S., of The Manchester Museum, The University, Manchester.

Jackson studied animal remains from archaeological sites throughout the 1930s and 1940s, and he published about 80 reports from sites around the UK including from Stonehenge, Woodhenge, Grimes Graves and Maiden Castle. In 1931 he joined Oliver Myers as part of an Egypt Exploration Society excavation, reporting on the remains of sacred cattle from the burials near Armant in Upper Egypt. Buxton Museum and Art Gallery holds (in the Jackson Archive) in excess of one hundred unpublished 'bone reports'.

Jackson also produced many general archaeological papers about artefacts, prehistory in Derbyshire and Manchester, Irish archaeology, and cave excavations from Derbyshire, Yorkshire, Scotland and Ireland. He contributed a chapter, "Archaeology and Palaeontology" to the book British Caving by Cullingford (1953, Routledge and Kegan Paul). In 1935 Jackson was a founding member of the British Speleological Association, and he was to become its president in 1964.

== Geology and paleontology ==
Just before World War I started, Jackson received a grant from the Royal Society of London to undertake geological survey work in the Dovedale area. Work was suspended during the war, but continued between 1918 and 1928. Jackson also conducted studies of the geology and palaeontology of other areas of North Derbyshire, especially in the Edale region. Jackson's study of the geological succession below the Kinder Scout grit, in which he demonstrated the presence of the Namurian Zones by their content of fossil Goniatites, was acknowledged by as an important contribution to Carboniferous stratigraphy.

In 1925 Jackson was appointed secretary to the newly established Manchester Geological Association. He later served three terms as president. He was elected to the Geologists' Association in 1925 and the Yorkshire Geological Association in 1927, and in 1934 received the Murchison Award of the Geological Society of London for his research in Dovedale and North Derbyshire. Jackson produced more than 50 papers on geology and palaeontology, notably a catalogue of the type and figured specimens in the Geology Department of Manchester Museum. In 1935 Jackson became a founder member of the British Speleological Association.

== Retirement ==
After his final curatorial job in Manchester, sorting and removing from Macclesfield the fossil collections of Sir Arthur Smith Woodward, Jackson retired from his position at the museum and took up retirement in Buxton. From there he continued to publish many scientific articles. He also engaged in teaching geology and archaeology, especially through Workers' Educational Association courses at centers in Manchester, Stockport, Buxton and Chapel-en-le Frith. His final W.E.A. course was completed in 1971 when he was over 90 years of age. He also lectured to many societies, organized and lead field trips, ran Bangor Summer Schools in geology (1956 to 1962), and participated in the National Trust Dovedale Local Committee, the C.P.R.E., the Council for British Archaeology and the Peak Park Planning Board. He was Honorary Consultant at Buxton Museum and Art Gallery.

His wife Alicia died in 1952, and Jackson was cared for in his later years by his daughter, also called Alicia. A year after the death of his son Robbie, Jackson died on 16 November 1978.

Professional and academic associations
| Preceded by John William Robinson Parker | President of the Lancashire and Cheshire Antiquarian Society; 1933–36 | Succeeded by Robert Wardman |
