= Lancashire and Cheshire Antiquarian Society =

Historical Society and registered charity

- Formation: 21 March 1883; 143 years ago
- Type: Historical Society
- Registration no.: 1105708
- Legal status: Charity
- Purpose: Historical Study; Research
- Headquarters: Manchester, UK
- Location: Portico Library
- Region served: Lancashire; Cheshire; Greater Manchester
- Official language: English
- Activities: Research; Publications; Lectures; Events; Heritage Conservation
- Collections: Archives
- Journal: Transactions
- President (57th): Dr Michael Nevell
- Website: www.landcas.org.uk

The Lancashire and Cheshire Antiquarian Society is a historical society and registered charity founded, on 21 March 1883, for the study of any aspects of the area covered by the Palatine Counties of Lancashire and Cheshire (and succeeding local authorities) from antiquity to the twenty-first century.

== History ==
It was at a meeting convened in response to a circular issued by George Charles Yates (held in the Rooms of the Manchester Literary and Philosophical Society, in George Street, Manchester), that several antiquaries and historians (including William Ernest Armytage Axon, James Croston, Alfred Darbyshire, Lt-Col. Henry Fishwick, Robert Langton, George Webster Napier, Thomas Glazebrook Rylands, Rev. Joseph Heaton Stanning, Henry Taylor, and William Thompson Watkin) proposed the creation of a society with the purpose of organising excursions to places of historical and archaeological interest in Lancashire and Cheshire. These individuals were elected to form the society's first officers and Council.

Honorary Membership (bestowed between 1883 and 1988) was awarded to various individuals who made a contribution to the society or to the life of the Counties Palatine, recipients included James, Earl of Crawford (1883), Charles Roach Smith (1885), Charles William Sutton (1888), Isabella Banks (1893), Sir Henry Hoyle Howorth (1903), Robert Dukinfield Darbishire (1903), Charles Roeder (1903), John Wilfrid Jackson (1918), and Sir Edward Holt, Bt (1943), amongst others.

Although the society is based upon Manchester, its studies and activities embrace the region. Its purpose is the education of the public by fostering and promoting the study of any aspects of the archaeology (traditional and industrial), history, social history, genealogy, architecture and the arts, trade and trades, the history of institutions and local government, customs, and traditions of the area covered by the Palatine Counties of Lancashire and Cheshire (and succeeding local authorities). The society became a registered charity in 2004.

== Journal ==
Transactions of the Lancashire and Cheshire Antiquarian Society
- Discipline: History
- Language: English
- Edited by: Dr Stephen F. Collins (15th)

Publication details
- History: 1883–present
- Frequency: Annual

Standard abbreviations
- ISO 4: Trans. Lancs. Ches. Antiqu. Soc.

Indexing
- ISSN: 0950-4699

Links
- Journal homepage

The Transactions of the Lancashire and Cheshire Antiquarian Society is the society's peer-reviewed periodical which is published annually, and includes papers covering a wide variety of subjects relating to the two counties.

The journal was established in 1883, by the founding Editor Rev. J.H. Stanning, and has been published almost continuously (with only occasional exceptions). The 111th volume was published in 2019, and the current (15th) Editor is Dr Stephen F. Collins. The society also produces other publications on occasion.

== Activities ==
The society organises a varied programme of lectures and events including visits to exhibitions, libraries, museums, galleries and places of historical, architectural and archaeological interest. The society's library (amassed since 1883) was donated to Manchester Central Library in 2019.

== Membership ==
Membership is open to all individuals and societies who are interested in the various historical aspects of the two Counties Palatine.

== Officers ==
=== Presidents ===
- 1883–85 Prof. Sir William Boyd Dawkins
- 1885–86 Wilbraham, 2nd Lord Egerton of Tatton
- 1886–89 James, 26th Earl of Crawford
- 1889–92 Sir William Cunliffe Brooks
- 1892–97 Spencer, 8th Duke of Devonshire
- 1897–98 Lt-Col. Henry Fishwick
- 1898–99 James Holme Nicholson
- 1899–1900 Charles William Sutton
- 1900–02 Prof. Sir William Boyd Dawkins
- 1902–03 Rev. Ernest Frederick Letts
- 1903–04 William Edward Armytage Axon
- 1904–05 Henry Taylor
- 1905–06 George Pearson
- 1906–07 Cecil, 1st Earl of Liverpool
- 1907–09 Henry Thomas Crofton
- 1909–10 Lt-Col. Gilbert Joseph French
- 1910–12 Fletcher Moss
- 1912–13 Albert Nicholson
- 1913–14 Rev. Henry Arnold Hudson
- 1914–15 William Harrison
- 1915–16 Nathan Heywood
- 1916–17 Charles Tallent Tallent-Bateman
- 1917–18 Rev. Thomas Cann Hughes
- 1918–19 Robert Peel
- 1919–20 Joseph James Phelps
- 1920–21 Ernest Charles Armytage Axon
- 1921–22 William Self Weeks
- 1922–23 John Swarbrick
- 1923–24 Col. Alan Francis Maclure
- 1924–25 Maj. David Halstead
- 1925–26 Llewellyn Andrew
- 1926–28 Walter Butterworth
- 1928–33 Col. John William Robinson Parker
- 1933–36 John Wilfrid Jackson
- 1936 Robert Wardman
- 1937–41 Alderman Thomas Middleton
- 1941–44 Rev. Canon Thomas Cruddas Porteus
- 1944–46 Arthur John Hawkes
- 1946–49 Dr George Henry Tupling
- 1949–52 William Scholes
- 1952–54 Edmund Ogden
- 1954–58 Prof. Roderick Urwick Sayce
- 1958–64 Dr James Alexander Petch
- 1964–67 Robert Norman Dore
- 1967–88 Victor Innes Tomlinson
- 1988–91 Robert Norman Dore
- 1991–94 Dr Leslie Doyle
- 1994–97 Gordon Bradley Hindle
- 1997–2000 Evelyn V. Vigeon
- 2000–03 Walter Bee
- 2003–09 Eric Foster
- 2009–12 Dr Edward Fletcher Cass
- 2012–16 Morris Garratt
- 2016–17 Dr Michael R. Powell
- 2017–20 Diana Winterbotham
- 2020–21 Geoffrey P. Higgins
- 2021–present Dr Michael Nevell

=== Vice-Presidents ===
- 2001–present Diana Winterbotham
- 2001–present Evelyn V. Vigeon
- 2009–2016 Eric Foster
- 2013–2016 Edward Alan Rose
- 2017–2021 Morris Garratt
- 2019–present Terry J. Wyke
- 2022-present Margaret Edwards
- 2022-present Charles Walker

=== Transactions Editors ===
- 1883–85 Rev. Joseph Heaton Stanning
- 1885–1920 Charles William Sutton
- 1907–11 George Pearson
- 1920–21 John G. Birkby
- 1921–34 Rev. Henry Arnold Hudson
- 1934–38 Dr George Henry Tupling
- 1938–49 Arthur John Hawkes
- 1949–54 Dr George Henry Tupling
- 1954–86 Prof. William Henry Chaloner
- 1975–88 Gordon Bradley Hindle
- 1986–87 Dr Dorothy J. Clayton
- 1989–92 Dr Michael R. Powell
- 1989–95 Dr John F. Wilson
- 1995–2012 Morris Garratt
- 2012–present Dr Stephen F. Collins

=== Secretaries ===
- 1883–1908 George Charles Yates
- 1909–19 Joseph James Phelps
- 1919–20 Arthur Albiston Brickhill
- 1920–27 Geoffrey Rogerson Axon
- 1927–36 Robert Wardman
- 1937–44 Dr John Thomas D’Ewart
- 1944–45 Henry Wardale
- 1945–50 Edna M. Richardson
- 1950–58 Herbert Clegg
- 1958–59 Alan J. Saunders
- 1959–64 Robert Norman Dore
- 1964–72 Prof. Owen Ashmore
- 1972–75 Arthur Gordon Rose
- 1975–79 A. Kennerley
- 1979–2013 Morris Garratt
- 2013–2024 Alice Lock

=== Treasurers ===
- 1883–85 Frederick A. Whaite
- 1885–89 Prof. Walter Arthur Copinger
- 1889–99 Thomas Letherbrow
- 1899–1920 William Harrison
- 1920–29 Robert Wardman
- 1929–31 Ernest Acaster
- 1931–35 George Grimshaw
- 1935–44 James William Hampson
- 1944–50 Cllr Charles Phillips Hampson
- 1951–57 Alfred John Lee
- 1957–61 Charles E. P. Rosser
- 1962–88 William John Smith
- 1988–92 Edward Alan Rose
- 1992–99 Terry J. Wyke
- 1999–2002 Edward Alan Rose
- 2002–05 John Stephen Matthews
- 2005–08 Graham Salmon
- 2008–12 Edward Alan Rose
- 2012–14 Dr Dorothy J. Clayton
- 2015–21 Morris Garratt
- 2021–present Lawrence R. Gregory

== See also ==
- Chetham Society
- Historic Society of Lancashire and Cheshire
- Record Society of Lancashire and Cheshire
- Lancashire Parish Register Society
