= George Henry Tupling =

British Historian (1883–1962)

G. H. Tupling FRHistS
- Born: 1883
- Died: 1962 (aged 78–79)
- Education: University of London

George Henry Tupling FRHistS (1883 – 1962) was a British historian who was Vice-President of the Chetham Society and President and Editor of the Lancashire and Cheshire Antiquarian Society.

== Life ==
Tupling was educated at the University of London gaining a Bachelors BSc(Econ) degree then proceeded to MA and PhD. He was elected a Fellow of the Royal Historical Society. He was one of the first to apply modern approaches to the study of local economic history in his Economic History of Rossendale (1927).

He was a Member of the Chetham Society, elected as Council Member in 1934 and then Vice-President in 1938 and later a Member of Manchester Literary and Philosophical Society from 1960. He was also involved in the Lancashire and Cheshire Antiquarian Society, being a Council Member from 1933 to 1961, twice Editor (1934–8 and 1949–54), President (1946–9) and Vice-President (1949–61).

== Select bibliography ==
- The Economic History of Rossendale, Chetham Society, New Series, 86 (1927).
- “The Royal and Seignorial Bailiffs of Lancashire in the Thirteenth and Fourteenth Centuries”, Chetham Miscellanies VIII, Chetham Society, New Series, 109 (1945).
- South Lancashire in the reign of Edward II: As illustrated by the pleas at Wigan recorded in Coram Rege roll no. 254, Chetham Society, Third Series, 1 (1949).

Professional and academic associations
Preceded by Arthur John Hawkes	President of the Lancashire and Cheshire Antiquarian Society; 1946–49	Succeeded by William Scholes
Preceded by Arthur John Hawkes	Editor of the Lancashire and Cheshire Antiquarian Society; 1949–54	Succeeded by William Henry Chaloner
Preceded by Rev. Henry Arnold Hudson	Editor of the Lancashire and Cheshire Antiquarian Society; 1934–38	Succeeded by Arthur John Hawkes
Preceded by George William Daniels	Vice-President of the Chetham Society; 1938–62	Succeeded by William Reginald Ward
