= William Boyd Dawkins =

Welsh geologist, paleontologist and archaeologist (1838–1929)

Sir William Boyd Dawkins FRS FSA FGS
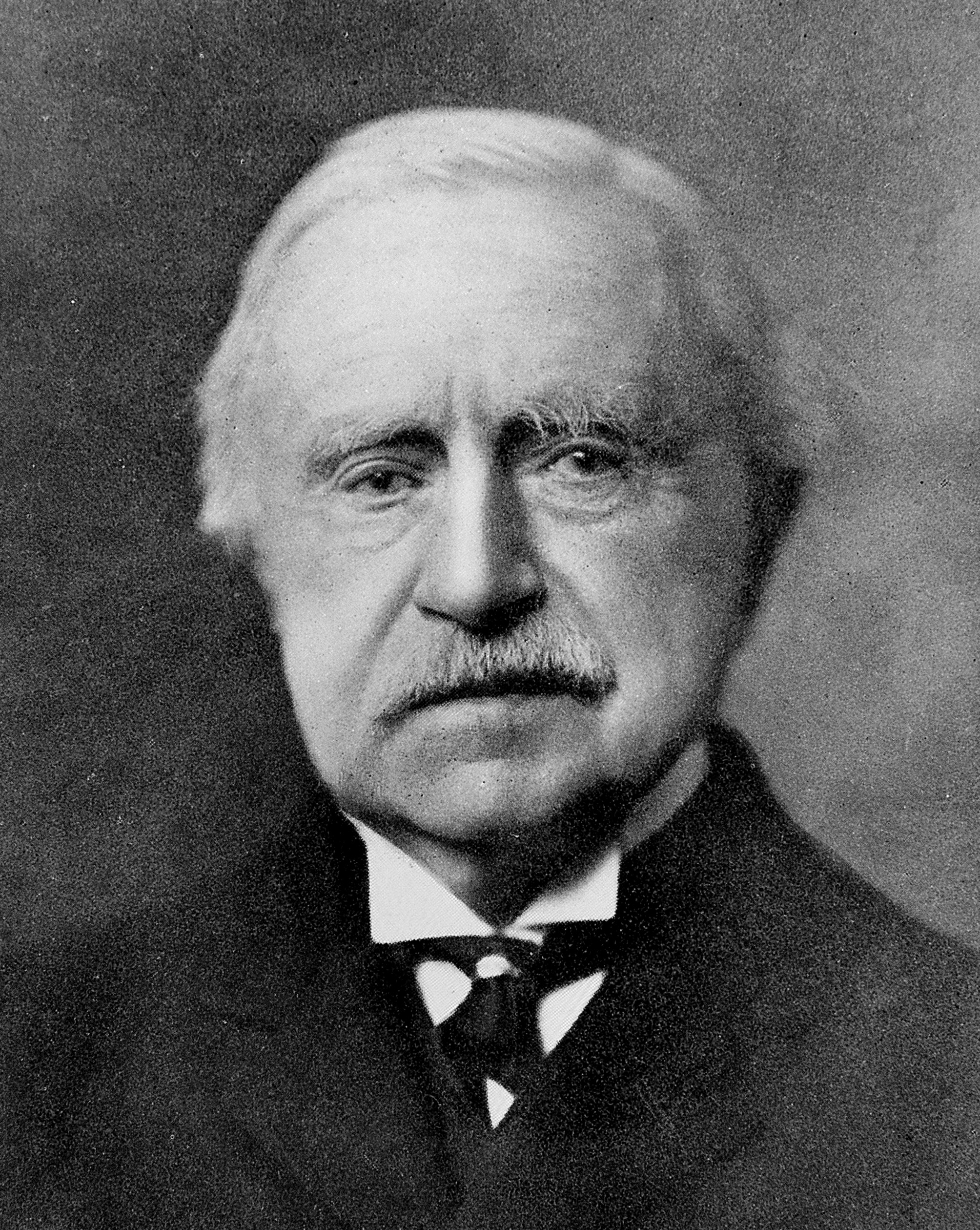
- William Boyd Dawkins
- Born: 26 December 1837; Buttington, Montgomeryshire, Wales
- Died: 15 January 1929 (aged 91)
- Education: Rossall School; Jesus College, Oxford
- Occupations: Geologist; Archaeologist

Signature
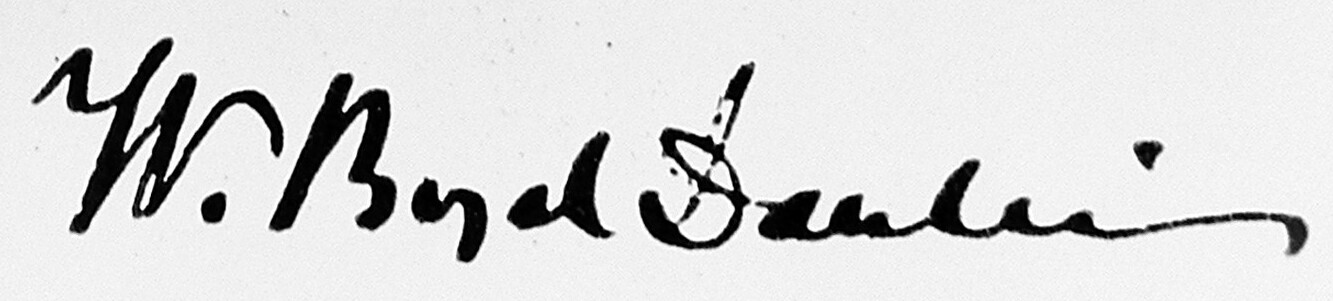

Sir William Boyd Dawkins FRS FSA FGS (26 December 1837 – 15 January 1929) was a British geologist and archaeologist. He was a member of the Geological Survey of Great Britain, Curator of the Manchester Museum and Professor of Geology at Owens College, Manchester. He is noted for his research on fossils and the antiquity of man. He was involved in many projects including a tunnel under the Humber, a Channel Tunnel attempt and the proving of coal under Kent.

== Background ==
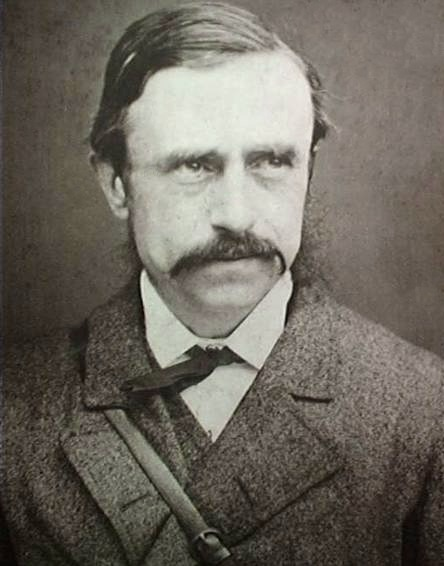
Dawkins as a young man

Dawkins was born in Wales at Buttington Vicarage in Montgomeryshire on 26 December 1837. He attracted attention at age five by collecting fossils from the local colliery spoil heaps. Soon after, his family moved into England to Fleetwood in Lancashire, where he attended Rossall School. He again attracted attention by adding fossils from the local boulder clay to his earlier collection. After leaving school, he attended Jesus College, Oxford. He graduated with a second in Classics and a first in Natural Sciences.

On leaving Oxford University in 1862, he joined the Geological Survey of Great Britain where he spent seven years working on the areas of Kent and the Thames Valley. In 1869, he was elected a member of the Geological Society and appointed Curator of the Manchester Museum, a position he held until 1890. In 1870, he took a further appointment as a lecturer at Owens College, Manchester. eventually becoming the first Professor of Geology in 1874.

Dawkins became involved with the Manchester Geological and Mining Society and was its President on three occasions: 1874–75, 1876–77 and 1886–87. He was also President of the Lancashire and Cheshire Antiquarian Society from 1885 to 1887 and again from 1900 to 1902. He was elected a Fellow of the Royal Society in 1867 and acted as President of the Anthropological Section of the British Association in 1882 and the Geological Section in 1888. He was elected as a member to the American Philosophical Society in 1880. He was initially elected to the membership of Manchester Literary and Philosophical Society on 2 November 1869 and to President in 1903. He was President of the Cambrian Archaeological Association in 1911–12 and, covering the First World War years, from 1913 to 1919. Dawkins was knighted for "services to geology" in the 1919 Birthday Honours. He died in 1929, aged 91.

== Archaeology ==
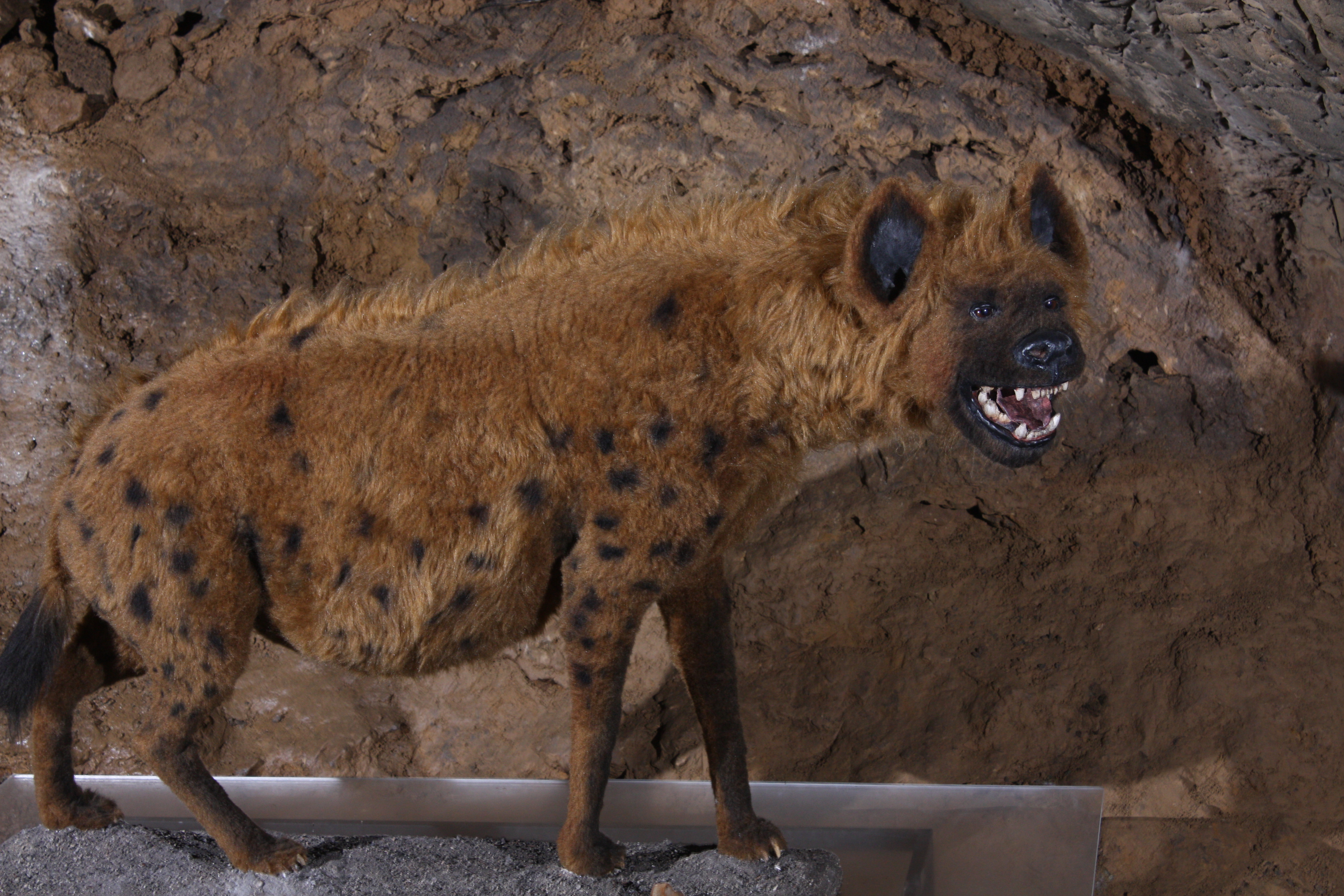
Reconstruction of cave hyena, Heinrichshöhle, Germany.

Dawkins achieved many distinctions in the field of archaeology. In 1859 he moved to Somerset to study classics with the vicar of Wookey. On hearing of the discovery of bones by local workmen he led excavations in the area of the hyena den at Wookey Hole Caves. He also excavated Aveline's Hole, expanding its entrance and naming it after his mentor William Talbot Aveline. His work led to the discovery of the first evidence for use by Palaeolithic man in the Caves of the Mendip Hills.

He spent a great deal of time researching in Derbyshire, especially at Creswell Crags and Windy Knoll near Castleton. At Windy Knoll (NGR SK126830), he proved the existence of exotic animals that lived in England prior to the ice ages. With Rooke Pennington and J. Tym, he discovered bones from bison, cave hyena, cave bear and a large cat, possibly a relative of the sabre tooth tiger. The bison bones were more recently dated at 37 300bp (OxA – 4579). Many of the finds are located in the museums of Buxton, Derbyshire and Manchester.

== Kent ==
In 1882, following from his work with the Geological Survey, Dawkins was appointed as the official surveyor by the Channel Tunnel Committee. He made a geological survey of the English and French coasts along the Dover and Calais areas, however the project was abandoned due to lack of money. He also participated in a scheme for a tunnel under the Humber.

In 1886, the South Eastern Railway Company approached Dawkins asking him if his Channel Tunnel work had shown any coal under Kent. The finding of coal under Kent would have given the company great financial benefits. Together with Henry Willett and the French geologist Pigou, Dawkins presented a paper in 1887 proving the existence of coal under the Cretaceous deposits of Kent.

== Philanthropy ==
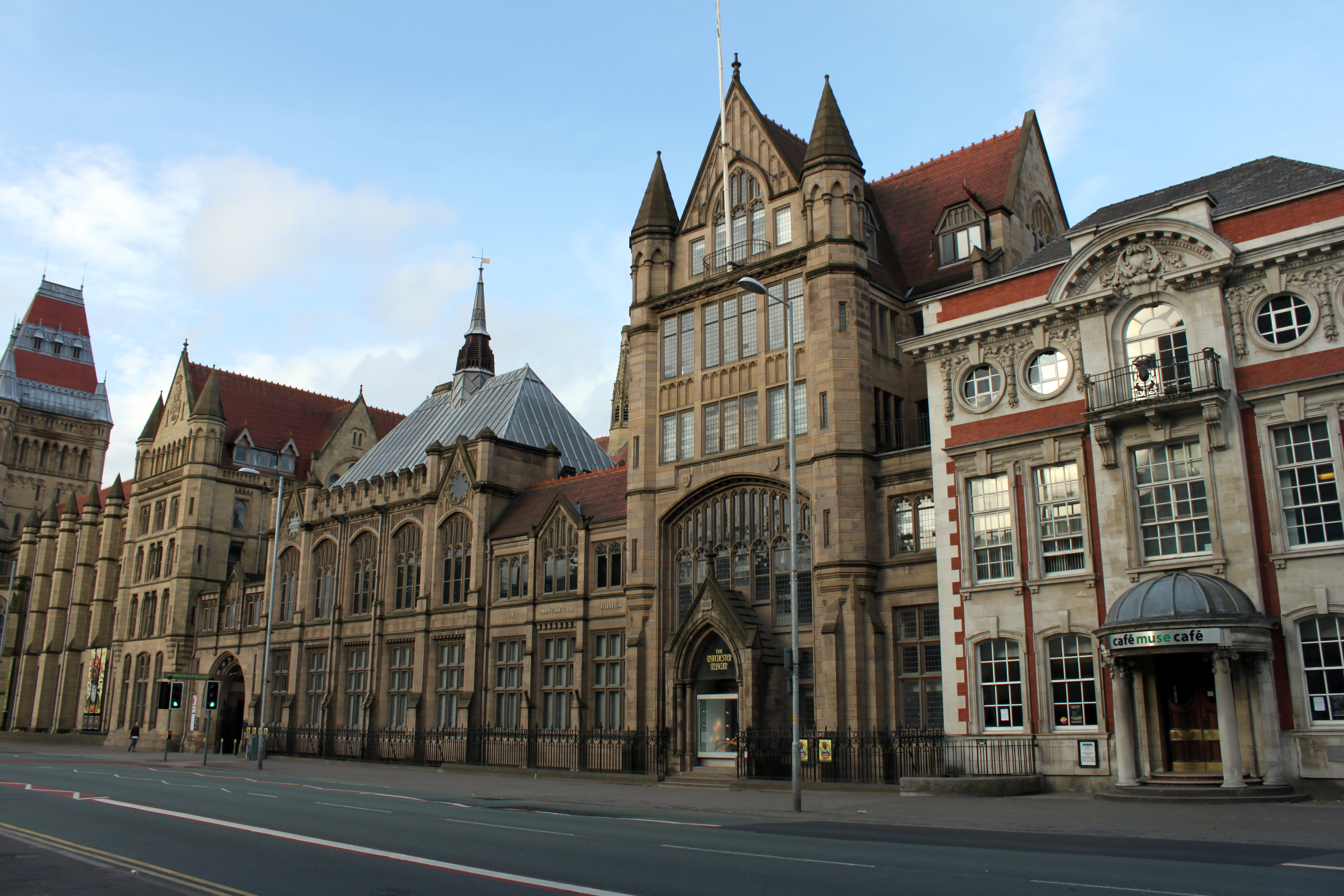
The Manchester Museum

Dawkins was a fighter for workers' rights especially in the coal mining industry. He lobbied hard to get a better education system for miners similar to the ones established in Germany. He donated undisclosed amounts of money to this cause.

Among his other donations was one to the Manchester Museum. The museum wanted to build an extension and started an appeal. The appeal raised £1015 2s 9d, of which Dawkins donated £500. Later in life he fought for compensation for people whose homes had been affected by subsidence from the salt mines and workings near Northwich, Cheshire.

On his death in 1929, his widow Lady Boyd Dawkins presented his library of some 400 works to the town of Buxton, Derbyshire. These books, together with other personal items such as a bronze bust, photographs and his Lyell and Prestwich medals, are housed at Buxton Museum and Art Gallery in the Boyd Dawkins Reference Room.

== Publications ==
Dawkins published many books and papers, but the best-known are:

- 1866–1939, 1962: British Pleistocene Mammalia. 6 vols. London: Printed for the Palaeontographical Society (co-author with W. Ayshford Sanford, S. H. Reynolds)
- 1874: Cave Hunting. London: Macmillan
- 1875: "The Mammalia found at Windy Knoll", in: Quarterly Journal of the Geological Society; 31, pp. 246–55
- 1877: "The exploration of the ossiferous deposits at Windy Knoll, Castleton, Derbyshire"., in: Quarterly Journal of the Royal Society of London; 33, pp. 724–29 (with R. Pennington)
- 1877: "On the Mammal-fauna of the Caves of Creswell Crags"., in: Quarterly Journal of the Geological Society; 33, pp. 589–612
- 1879: "Further discoveries in the Creswell Crags", in: Quarterly Journal of the Geological Society; 35, pp. 724–35 (with J. M. Mello)
- 1880: Early Man in Britain and His Place in the Tertiary Period.. London: Macmillan

== Sources ==
- Manias, Chris (2024). "William Boyd Dawkins: race, geology and the deep past in Manchester, 1869-1929", in Stuart Jones (ed), Manchester Minds: A University History of Ideas. Manchester: Manchester University Press.
- Tweedale, Geoffrey & Procter, Timothy "Catalogue of the Papers of Professor Sir William Boyd Dawkins in the John Rylands University Library of Manchester", in: Bulletin of the John Rylands University Library of Manchester; vol. 74, no. 2 (1992), pp. 3–36
- Tweedale, Geoffrey & Procter, Timothy (c. 1990) New Documentary Evidence on the Career of Sir William Boyd Dawkins FRS (1837–1929). Manchester: John Rylands Research Institute Scientific Archives Project
- Wood, Kenneth (1987) Rich Seams—the history of the Manchester Geological and Mining Society. Bolton: Manchester Geological and Mining Society ISBN 0-904905-13-6
- Various papers, University of Manchester, John Rylands Library, Deansgate, Manchester
- Various archive papers of the Manchester Geological and Mining Society

Professional and academic associations
Preceded by Charles Bailey	President of the Manchester Literary and Philosophical Society; 1903–05	Succeeded by Sir William Henry Bailey
Preceded by Creation	President of the Lancashire and Cheshire Antiquarian Society; 1883–85	Succeeded by Wilbraham, 2nd Lord Egerton of Tatton
Preceded by Charles William Sutton	President of the Lancashire and Cheshire Antiquarian Society; 1900–02	Succeeded by Ernest Frederick Letts
