= List of places in Powys =

See the list of places in Wales for places in other principal areas.

This is a list of towns and villages in the principal area of Powys, Wales.

== A ==
- Abercraf
- Abercynafon
- Aberhafesp
- Aberhosan
- Aberllynfi
- Abertridwr
- Adfa
- Abermule

== B ==
- Beggar's Bush
- Berriew (Aberriw)
- Bettws Cedewain (Betws Cedewain)
- Bont Dolgadfan
- Boughrood (Bochrwd)
- Brecon (Aberhonddu)
- Builth Road
- Builth Wells (Llanfair ym Muallt)
- Burlingjobb
- Bwlch

== C ==
- Caehopkin
- Caersws
- Capel-y-ffin
- Carno
- Cathedine
- Cefn Coch
- Cemmaes
- Cemmaes Road
- Cilmeri
- City
- Clyro
- Coelbren
- Commins Coch
- Crickhowell
- Crossgates
- Cwmdu
- Cwmtwrch
- Cwmwysg

== D ==
- Defynnog
- Dolfach
- Dylife

== E ==
- Elan Village
- Erwood
- Esgairgeiliog
- Evenjobb

== F ==
- Felindre near Beguildy
- Felindre near Gwernyfed
- Felin-fach
- Four Crosses, Llanfair Caereinion
- Four Crosses near Oswestry
- Fron, Llandrindod Wells
- Fron, Montgomery
- Fron, Welshpool

== G ==
- Garth
- Gladestry
- Glangrwyney
- Glasbury
- Glyntawe
- Guilsfield

== H ==
- Hay-on-Wye
- Honddu Isaf
- Howey
- Hyssington

== K ==
- Kerry
- Knighton

== L ==
- Little London
- Llan
- Llanafan Fawr
- Llanbrynmair
- Llandeilo'r-Fan
- Llandinam
- Llandrindod Wells
- Llandyfaelog Tre'r-graig
- Llandysilio
- Llandyssil
- Llanfair Caereinion
- Llanfechain
- Llanfihangel Nant Bran
- Llanfilo
- Llanfyllin
- Llangadfan
- Llangammarch Wells
- Llangors
- Llangunllo
- Llangurig
- Llangynidr
- Llanidloes
- Llanigon
- Llanrhaeadr-ym-Mochnant
- Llansantffraid-ym-Mechain
- Llanstephan
- Llanwddyn
- Llanwrin
- Llanwrtyd Wells
- Llanymynech
- Llowes
- Llyswen

== M ==
- Machynlleth
- Manafon
- Middletown
- Milford
- Montgomery

== N ==
- Newbridge-on-Wye (Pontnewydd ar Wy)
- New Mills, Powys.
- New Radnor
- Newtown (Y Drenewydd)
- Norton

== O ==
- Old Radnor

== P ==
- Pandy
- Penegoes
- Pengenffordd
- Penisarcwm
- Pen-isa'r-waen
- Pennant Melangell
- Penpont
- Penstrowed
- Penybont
- Pipton
- Pontdolgoch
- Pool Quay
- Presteigne (Llanandras)

== R ==
- Rhayader
- Rhiwargor

== S ==
- St Harmon
- Sarn
- Sennybridge
- Staylittle

== T ==
- Talachddu
- Talerddig
- Talgarth
- Talybont-on-Usk
- Tirabad
- Trallong
- Trecastle
- Tredomen
- Trefeitha
- Trefeglwys
- Tregynon

== V ==
- Van

== W ==
- Walton
- Welshpool (Y Trallwng)

== Y ==
- Ystradfellte
- Ystradgynlais

== See also ==
- List of places in Powys (categorised)
- List of places in Wales
