= Ffrwd Fawr =

Coordinates: 52.5342°N 3.6624°W

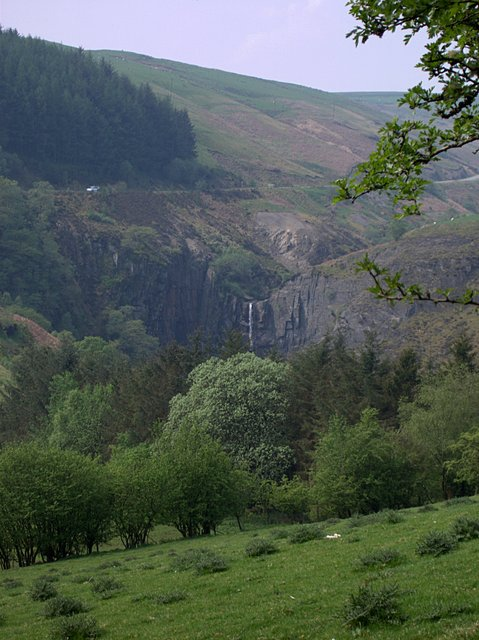
- Interactive map of Ffrwd Fawr
- Location: Powys, Wales
- Total height: 40 m (130 ft)

Ffrwd Fawr (Welsh for 'great stream') is a waterfall in Powys, Wales.

== Location ==
The River Twymyn flows from the 40-metre-high (130 ft) Ffrwd Fawr Waterfall at the head of the Pennant Valley at Dylife Gorge near Dylife between Machynlleth and Staylittle.

== See also ==
- List of waterfalls
- List of waterfalls in Wales
