= Staylittle =

Coordinates: 52.5162°N 3.6418°W

Staylittle: Welsh: Penffordd-las
- Location within Powys
- OS grid reference: SN885925
  - Cardiff: 90 miles (140 km) S
  - London: 211 miles (340 km) ESE
- Community: Trefeglwys
- Principal area: Powys
- Preserved county: Powys
- Country: Wales
- Sovereign state: United Kingdom
- Post town: LLANBRYNMAIR
- Postcode district: SY19
- Dialling code: 01686
- Police: Dyfed-Powys
- Fire: Mid and West Wales
- Ambulance: Welsh
- UK Parliament: Montgomeryshire and Glyndŵr
- Senedd Cymru – Welsh Parliament: Montgomeryshire

Staylittle (Welsh: Penffordd-las), sometimes referred to colloquially as Y Stay or Y Stae, is a village in Powys, Wales. It is located in the shallow upland basin of the Afon Clywedog on the B4518 road, equidistant from Llanidloes and Llanbrynmair. It was historically in Montgomeryshire.

== History ==
A cluster of Bronze Age burial mounds and a flint scraper found in the area provide significant evidence of possible settlement and land use, probably seasonal, in the late Neolithic and Bronze Age.

During the medieval period the land in the Staylittle area was also largely used seasonally. Local place-names suggest that any settlement in the area was associated with grazing and stock rearing. Given the number of place-names containing the element hafod (summer dwelling) and the fact that much of the land was seasonally waterlogged, it would seem that much of this early settlement was associated with upland summer grazing.

The lands to the north of Staylittle were granted to the Cistercian monastery Strata Marcella by the Prince of Powys Wenwynwyn in 1187. Those to the immediate south were granted to Strata Marcella around 1195 by Cadwaladr ap Hywel, son of the ruler of Arwystli.

Those lands a little further south, close to Cwm Biga, were granted to the Cwmhir Abbey by Gwenwynwyn in about the same period. The two Cistercian houses were often in dispute over these lands. On the dissolution of the monasteries the land in the possession of Cwmhir Abbey passed into the hands of Robert Dudley, Earl of Leicester, who on his death in 1588 bequeathed them to University College, Oxford, which owned them until 1920.

One of the important historical routes through Montgomeryshire passed through the area. It is thought that the Roman road from Caersws to a nearby Roman fortlet passed through what is now the village. It also lay on the drovers' road - later to become a turnpike - between Machynlleth and Llanidloes.

Inns and blacksmiths' forges were often established along such routes and it is said that Staylittle village derives its name from such an inn, the Stay-a-little Inn. One local legend has it that the two blacksmith brothers working in the smithy attached to the inn were able to shoe horses so quickly that travellers only had to 'stay-a-little' before being able to continue on their journey and it was thus that the inn, and subsequently the village, acquired its name.

Staylittle as a village probably was in existence by the early 18th century. The study of the area by CPAT argues that this was, '...probably due to its position on the edge of unenclosed common land roughly midway between Llanidloes, Machynlleth and Llanbrynmair.'

== Education ==
Staylittle's first school was opened in January 1874 as a result of the Elementary Education Act 1870. It seems that among the adults of the area there was a thirst for education, for among those who attended the day school was a married woman of whom it was reported,

'She accepted of a husband when she had the chance, and she does the same with education. No one can deny but that she had gone to school sooner had there been one in reach.'

Several men also attended the evening school including a number of married men. It does seem, however, that a significant number of children did not attend. Prominent among the reasons their parents proffered for this was their inability to provide suitable clothes for their children to attend in. One parent justified his children's lack of attendance by informing the School Board that,

'...he had five children between the ages of six and twelve years, that he was too poor to properly clothe any of them so as to be fit to appear in society, and besides he could not spare any of them. He occupied a few acres of land, kept a cow or two, and the fences were imperfect, and he wanted the children to take care of them and to keep the sheep and cattle of his neighbours off the land. He was himself bound to go from home to gather food for them. As a rule the family was supplied with bread by appealing to the benevolence of the neighbouring farmers for corn. The clothes, or rather rags, that covered the kids came from a similar source. He had never been able to find anyone of them with a new suit of clothes at once; consequently not one of them had ever been to Sunday school, although there is one kept at a cottage in the immediate vicinity. Not one of them had ever attended a place of worship from the time of their birth and he most emphatically declared that, unless he was allowed to keep his children in his own way, without at all being interfered with, he would be bound to become a pauper at once. He could not even promise to send one to school under present circumstances, although he admitted that it would be well if the children were educated.'

Others 'desired leave for their children to attend every other week, their services being required to nurse baby, or a sick mother'

== Religion ==
In the early 18th century the farm at Esgair-goch became a Meeting House for the Religious Society of Friends. Under the care of John Goodwin, it subsequently played a significant role in the development of Quakerism in Montgomeryshire. When Quakerism in Montgomeryshire declined in the latter part of the 18th century it is said that,

'...the major focus of the movement had moved from Efyrnwy valley and Dolobran to the farmhouse of Esgair - goch, near Staylittle, where penurious but persevering John Goodwin and his wife strove valiantly to save Quakers from extinction.'

Later, in the 19th century, Staylittle played an important role in the provision of non-conformist places of worship – Baptist and Methodist (originally at Rock Villa) for the nearby farming and mining communities.

== Welsh language ==
Historically, western Montgomeryshire has been a relative stronghold of the Welsh language. Though it is difficult to isolate statistics pertaining to Staylittle alone, those for the area in and around the village indicate that, to a degree, this is still the case. With regard to Llanbrynmair ward to the immediate north of Staylittle, the 2001 census indicates that the Welsh language in the area retains its strength, with 61% of the population having one or more of the skills, reading, writing and speaking Welsh, and with 48% having all three. This represents a decline on the figures for 1991 when 68.3% were recorded as Welsh speakers. For Blaen Hafren ward, in the north of which Staylittle is situated, the Welsh language does not have such a strong foothold, with 42% of the population having one or more skills and 21% having all three.

== Migration ==
Though Staylittle was not a mining village it owed some of its population growth, in the Victorian period, to the importance of lead mining in the area. From 1851 its population grew steadily if not spectacularly with people migrating from out of the area to work in the nearby mines of Dylife and Dyfngwn.

After 1881 with the decline of lead mining the population of the parish Trefeglwys, in which Staylittle is found, declined rapidly, dropping by over 30% in the course of 20 years. Many of the men who left the area did so to find work in the South Wales coalfields.

== Outdoor pursuits ==
To the south of the village lies Clywedog reservoir (Welsh: Llyn Clywedog), created in the 1960s, where there are sailing and angling clubs.

The National Cycle Route NCR 8 (Welsh: Lôn Las Cymru) and the long-distance footpath Glyndŵr's Way (Welsh: Llwybr Glyndŵr) pass through Staylittle.

Powys County Council previously maintained an Outdoor Pursuits Centre in Staylittle.

== Notable people ==
- Sir David Brunt, KBE, FRS (1886–1965), a Welsh meteorologist, the 'father of meteorology', attended Staylittle Primary School.
