= Stingwern Hill =

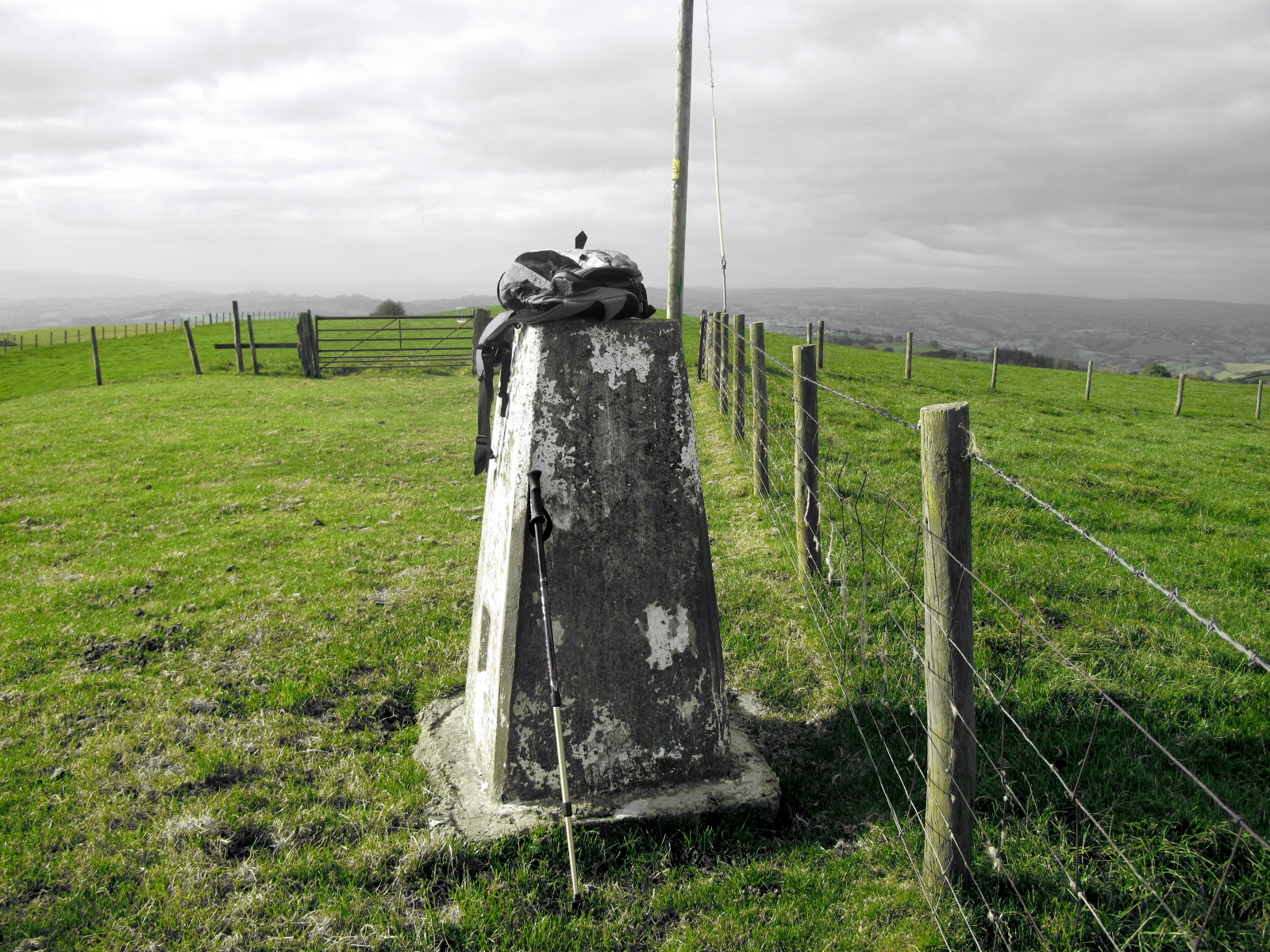
- The summit of Stingwern Hill

Highest point
- Elevation: 358 m (1,175 ft)
- Prominence: 180 m (590 ft)
- Coordinates: 52°36′14″N 3°16′55″W

Geography
- Location within Wales
- Location: Manafon, Mid Wales, Wales, UK
- OS grid: SJ132801
- Topo map: OS Explorer 215

Stingwern Hill, or ‘the Stingwern’ is a marilyn near Manafon in Mid Wales. Its summit is approximately 358 metres (1,175 ft) above sea level and has a prominence of 180 metres (590 ft).
