= Humffrey Davies =

Welsh poet

Humffrey Davies (Wmffre Dafydd ab Ifan) was a 17th-century Welsh poet. He is thought to have been from the Llanbrynmair area of Montgomeryshire.

His known work includes cywyddau, englynion, and carols - mostly of a religious and didactic nature. Some of these feature in the Llanstephan manuscripts.
