= Aled Hall =

Welsh operatic tenor

- Born: 1968 (age 57–58); Pencader, Carmarthenshire, Wales
- Origin: England
- Occupation: Operatic tenor

Aled Hall (Jones) is a Welsh operatic tenor from Pencader, Carmarthenshire, Wales. He is currently a member of the Three Welsh Tenors with Rhys Meirion and Aled Wyn Davies.

== Early life and education ==
Aled Hall was born in 1968 and raised in West Wales, living on a farm when he started singing at the age of four in the local chapel. He went on to win several eisteddfod competitions, including the prestigious W. Towyn Roberts Scholarship at the National Eisteddfod of Wales in 1994. He was educated at Ysgol Ramadeg Llandysul before progressing to study music at the University College of Wales, Aberystwyth, the London Royal Schools’ Faculty Opera School, and at the National Opera Studio, London.

== Career ==
He has performed over the world in principal operatic roles, including Don Curzio in Le Nozze di Figaro for Aix-en-Provence, Tokyo, and Baden Baden, Mr. Upfold in Albert Herring at the Salzburger Landestheater, Ippia in Saffo, Danilowitz in L’Etoile du Nord at the Wexford Festival, both of which were recorded on the Marco Polo label, Spoletta in Tosca and Remendado Carmen for Raymond Gubbay at the Royal Albert Hall, and Don Basilio in Le Nozze di Figaro, Bardolfo in Falstaff and Frisellino in Le Pescatrici for Garsington Opera.
