= St Michael's Church, Manafon =

Coordinates: 52.6128°N 3.3113°W

St Michael's Church
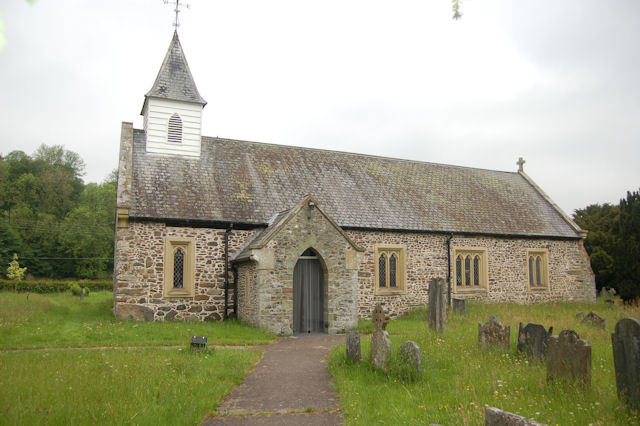
- The church viewed from the south
- St Michael's Church
- OS grid reference: SJ 113 024
- Location: Manafon, Powys
- Country: Wales
- Denomination: Anglican
- Website: St Michael's Manafon

History
- Status: Parish church
- Dedication: St Michael

Architecture
- Functional status: Active
- Heritage designation: Grade II*
- Designated: 10 March 1953
- Architect: John Douglas (Restoration)
- Architectural type: Church
- Style: Gothic, Gothic Revival
- Completed: 1898

Specifications
- Materials: Stone with slate roof

Administration
- Province: Church in Wales
- Diocese: St Asaph
- Archdeaconry: Montgomery
- Deanery: Mathrafal
- Parish: Llanfair Caereinion, Llanllugan and Manafon

St Michael's Church is in the small village of Manafon, Powys, Wales. It is an active Anglican church in the parish of Llanfair Caereinion, Llanllugan and Manafon, the deanery of Mathrafal, the archdeaconry of Montgomery and the diocese of St Asaph. The church has been designated by Cadw as a Grade II* listed building.

== History ==
There is documentary evidence relating to the church in 1254 and 1291 but otherwise its history is largely unknown until it was restored in 1859. In this restoration windows, including a five-light dormer window on the south side, were replaced and the vestry was added. A further restoration was carried out by the Chester architect John Douglas in 1898. Plaster was removed from the walls and the chancel floor was raised. Douglas replaced the seating, added a screen between the nave and chancel, provided a new pulpit, lectern, prayer desks, altar rails and table, sedilia and a credence table. He also designed the lych gate at the entrance to the churchyard. In 1992 repairs were undertaken to the interior of the west wall.

Three poets of note have been rectors of the church: Walter Davies (better known as Gwallter Mechain) from 1807 to 1837; William Morgan (whose bardic name was Penfro) from 1904 to 1918, and R. S. Thomas from 1942 to 1954.

== Architecture ==
The church is built in stone with slate roofs. Its plan consists of a nave and chancel in a single chamber with a south porch, a north vestry and a timber belfry at the west end. On the end of the east gable is a Celtic cross finial. The east window is the original Perpendicular window; the other windows date from the 1859 restoration. The belfry is painted white; it has louvred bell-openings on the north and south faces, and a pyramidal slate roof surmounted by a weathercock.

== External features ==
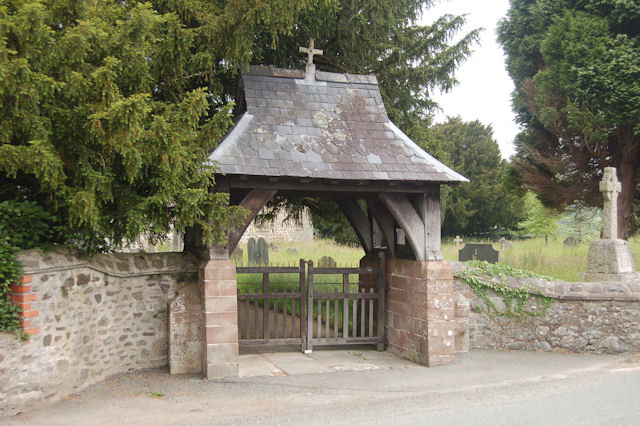
Lychgate designed by John Douglas

In the churchyard is a sundial set on a wooden plinth. The lychgate is at the main, southwest entrance. A slate hipped roof is supported by three tie-beams and has a central cross. The middle tie-beam is inscribed in Welsh on the church side and in English on the side of the road.

== See also ==
- List of church restorations, amendments and furniture by John Douglas
