= Richard P. Howell =

American carpenter, businessman, and politician

Richard P. Howell (September 3, 1831 – April 5, 1899) was an American carpenter, businessman, and politician.

== Early life and education ==
Howell was born in Pennant, Powys, in the parish of Llanbrynmair, Powys, Montgomeryshire, Wales, United Kingdom. He went to the public schools in Wales. In 1854, Howell emigrated to the United States and settled in Racine, Wisconsin. Howell worked as a carpenter and was a contractor. He also was involved with the banking business in Racine. Howell served on the Racine Board of Education and on the Racine County, Wisconsin Board of Supervisors. Howell was a Republican. In 1882, Howell served in the Wisconsin Assembly. Howell died at his home in Racine, Wisconsin. He was suffering from rheumatism.
