= Aled Wyn Davies =

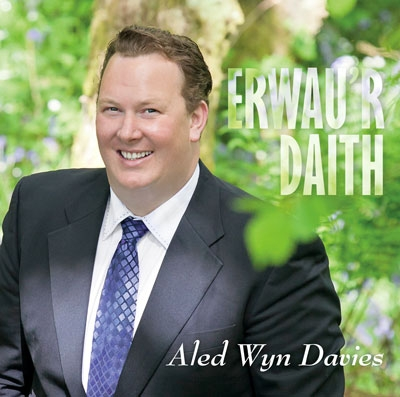

Background information
- Born: 3 August 1974 (age 51)
- Origin: Llanbrynmair, Powys, Wales
- Genres: Opera / Classical
- Occupation: Farmer / Classical Singer
- Label: Sain

Aled Wyn Davies (born 3 August 1974) is a classical tenor from Llanbrynmair, in Powys, Mid Wales. He is a member of the Three Welsh Tenors with Rhys Meirion and Aled Hall.

== Early life ==
Davies's family were evicted from the farm run by Davies's grandparents, Dai and Mary, in 1964, when the valley was flooded to create the Clywedog Reservoir. In periods of major drought, the foundations of the building are sometimes visible, so that Davies and his children have been able to visit it. The family relocated to another farm, previously run by the family of harpist Elinor Bennett. Davies will be one of the performers at Bennett's farewell concert in 2023.

== Career ==
Davies is a tenor soloist who has performed in venues all over the world. He was awarded the prestigious "David Ellis Memorial Prize" - The Blue Riband awarded to the best classical soloist at the National Eisteddfod of Wales in Swansea in 2006 following a hat-trick of wins in the Tenor solo over 25 in 2004, 2005 and 2006.

Concerts include tours to New Zealand and Australia in 2003, Y Wladfa, Patagonia, Argentina in 2007 & 2019, Welsh Church, Los Angeles, United States in 2003, 2004 & 2010 and Saint David's Day concerts in Johannesburg, South Africa in March, 2008.

In August, 2008 he travelled to Chicago, USA as a guest soloist at the North American Festival of Wales. He returned to perform at this Festival in 2011 in Cleveland, Ohio, and in Millwauke, Wisconsin in 2019.

In February, 2015 he was invited to sing the Pearl Fishers duet with Bryn Terfel in a celebratory concert in Machynlleth.

Davies has shared the stage with many other established international performers including Côr Godre’r Aran, Froncysyllte Male Voice Choir; Rebecca Evans; Gwyn Hughes Jones; Jonathan Lemalu; David Kempster; Shan Cothi and actor, William Roache.

Davies recorded his debut album, Nodau Aur fy Nghân in November, 2006 under Welsh record label Sain. He has also performed in classical concerts on cruises for Swan Hellenic and is also a sheep farmer in the Cambrian Mountains of Mid Wales.

In December, 2014 he was unveiled as the new member of the Three Welsh Tenors with Rhys Meirion and Aled Hall following Alun Rhys-Jenkins' departure.

His second album "Erwau'r Daith" was released in July, 2015 with record label Sain.

His Welsh autobiography, “O’r Gwlân i’r Gân” will be published in October, 2020.

== Recordings ==
- Ann!, (Cwmni Theatr Maldwyn), July 2004 (Sain)
- Nodau Aur Fy Nghân, November 2006 (Sain)
- Erwau'r Daith, July 2015 (Sain)

== Awards and accolades ==
- 1st Open Folk Song competition - Folk Festival, Aberystwyth 1997.
- 1st Traditional Folk-song competition - Llangollen International Eisteddfod 1999
- Best Soloist - YFC Eisteddod of Wales, Newtown 1999
- Lady Ruth Herbert Lewis Memorial Prize - National Eisteddfod of Wales, Denbigh 2001
- Unawdydd 2001 (Soloist 2001)- National Eisteddfod of Wales, Denbigh 2001
- 1st Tenor Solo over 25 - National Eisteddfod of Wales, Newport 2004
- Soloist of the Year - Llangollen International Eisteddfod 2005
- 1st Tenor Solo over 25 - National Eisteddfod of Wales, Bangor, 2005
- Blue Riband & Soloist of the festival - Cardigan Music Festival 2006
- 1st Tenor Solo over 25 - National Eisteddfod of Wales, Swansea 2006
- David Ellis Memorial Prize - The Blue Riband - National Eisteddfod of Wales, Swansea 2006.
