= Aled Davies =

Aled Davies may refer to:

- Aled Wyn Davies (born 1974), Welsh classical tenor
- Aled Davies (field athlete) (born 1991), Paralympic athlete from Wales
- Aled Davies (rugby union) (born 1992), Welsh rugby union player
