= Dylife Gorge =

Coordinates: 52.5376°N 3.663°W

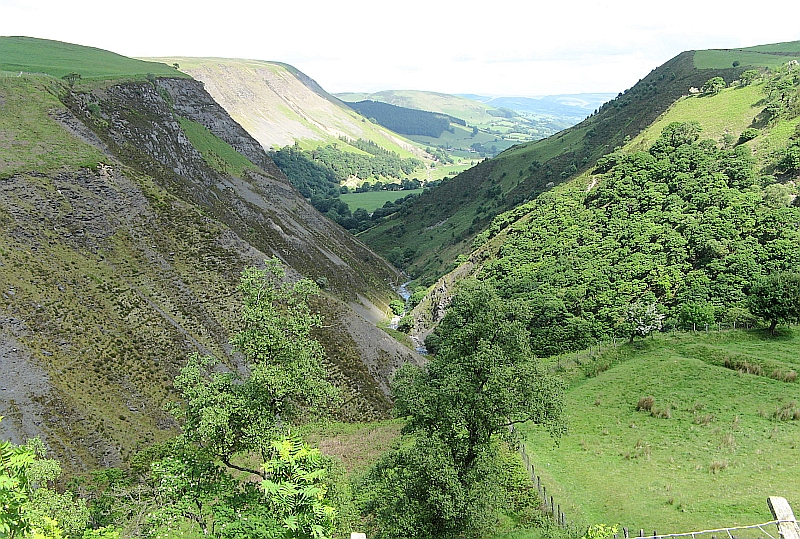
- Dylife Gorge, June 2008

- Location within Powys
- OS grid reference: SH891027
- Principal area: Powys
- Preserved county: Powys
- Country: Wales
- Sovereign state: United Kingdom
- Police: Dyfed-Powys
- Fire: Mid and West Wales
- Ambulance: Welsh
- UK Parliament: Montgomeryshire and Glyndŵr

The Dylife Gorge, located near Dylife, Powys, Mid Wales, was carved by the action (and aftermath) of the last Ice age. It is headed by the Ffrwd Fawr Waterfall.

Before the last Ice age, the River Twymyn did not flow through the valley. When the valley was filled by a glacier, the ice ground out a U-shaped glaciated valley. When the glacier that filled the valley melted the Twymyn started to run down the wide channel left behind and the fast flowing river further eroded the valley, cutting the V-shaped gorge as seen today.

The long-distance footpath Glyndŵr's Way (Welsh: Llwybr Glyndŵr) passes nearby.

== See also ==
- Geology of the United Kingdom
