= Pandy, Powys =

Coordinates: 52.62665°N 3.6191°W

Pandy
- Location within Powys
- OS grid reference: SH905044
- Principal area: Powys
- Preserved county: Powys
- Country: Wales
- Sovereign state: United Kingdom
- Post town: LLANBRYNMAIR
- Postcode district: SY19
- Dialling code: 01650
- Police: Dyfed-Powys
- Fire: Mid and West Wales
- Ambulance: Welsh
- UK Parliament: Montgomeryshire
- Senedd Cymru – Welsh Parliament: Montgomeryshire

Pandy (also known as Pandy-rhiw-Saeson) is a small village in Powys, Wales located off the main A470 road near Llanbrynmair.

It was formerly the location of a watermill.
