= Bont Dolgadfan =

Hamlet in the county of Powys, Wales

Coordinates: 52.5882°N 3.645°W

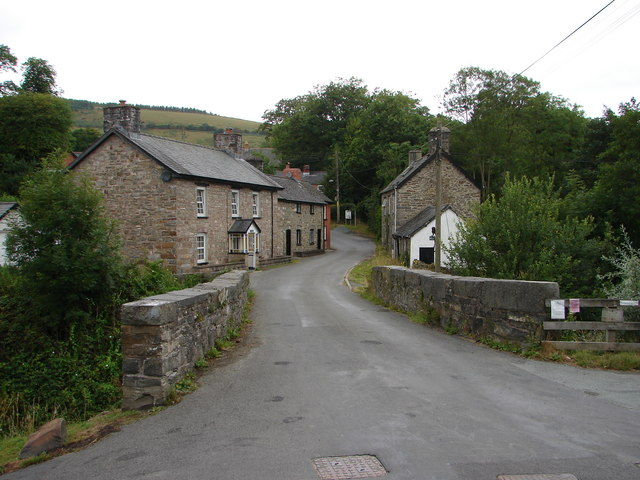

- Location within Powys
- OS grid reference: SH886002
- Principal area: Powys
- Preserved county: Powys
- Country: Wales
- Sovereign state: United Kingdom
- Post town: LLANBRYNMAIR
- Postcode district: SY19
- Dialling code: 01650
- Police: Dyfed-Powys
- Fire: Mid and West Wales
- Ambulance: Welsh
- UK Parliament: Montgomeryshire and Glyndŵr
- Senedd Cymru – Welsh Parliament: Montgomeryshire

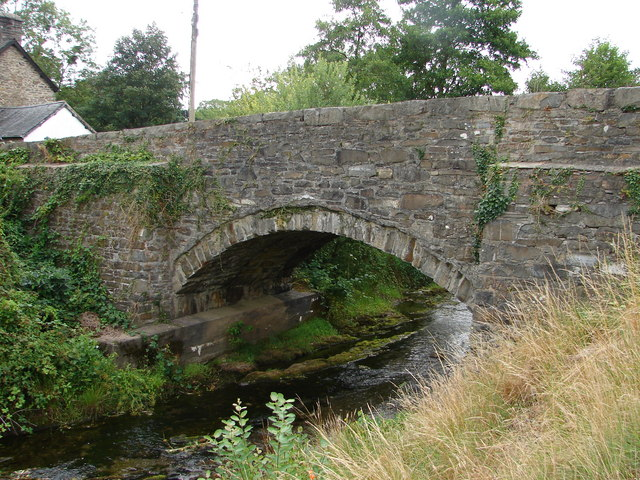
Bont Dolgadfan Bridge

Bont Dolgadfan or Bontdolgadfan is a small village off the B4518 road in Powys, Wales. It is part of the community of Llanbrynmair and forms a community ward for elections to the community council.

There are two major estates in Bont Dolgadfan, Dolgadfan itself and Plas Llwyn Owen. The area has in the past been used for hunting game.

The Bont Dolgadfan bridge (Pont is Welsh for "bridge") is in the centre of the hamlet crossing the Afon Twymyn. It probably dates from the 18th century and was an important river crossing for the droveroad to Talerddig. The bridge is a Grade II listed structure.

Famous former residents include the late High Court Judge Wintringham Norton Stable.

== See also ==
- List of bridges in Wales
