= Ysgol Bro Ddyfi =

Coordinates: 52.5891°N 3.8551°W

- Machynlleth, Powys, SY20 8DR; Wales

Information
- Motto: Lumen Nobis Sit Scienta
- Closed: 2014
- Local authority: Powys County Council
- Gender: co-educational
- Age: 11 to 18
- Houses: Llywelyn; Dewi; Glyndwr
- Colours: Navy and Light Blue
- Website: web.archive.org/web/20111028043318/http://www.broddyfi.co.uk (archive)

Ysgol Bro Ddyfi was a bilingual school, offering teaching in Welsh and English, and was based in the town of Machynlleth, Powys, Wales. It was a BAND 3 school according to the Welsh school banding table of 2013, previously BAND 2 in 2012 and BAND 4 in 2011.

The school closed in 2014 after many years of success. To be reopened the following school year, September 2014 as Ysgol Bro Hyddgen; a new age 3 to 18 years school. Merging Ysgol Bro Ddyfi and Ysgol Gynradd Machynlleth, over 2 campuses.
