= Bryntail lead mine =

Disused lead mine in Powys, Wales

Coordinates: 52°28′07″N 3°36′02″W

Bryntail lead mine is a disused lead mine near Llanidloes in Powys, Wales. Sited on the Afon Clywedog and in the shadow on the Clywedog reservoir dam, it is in the care of Cadw.

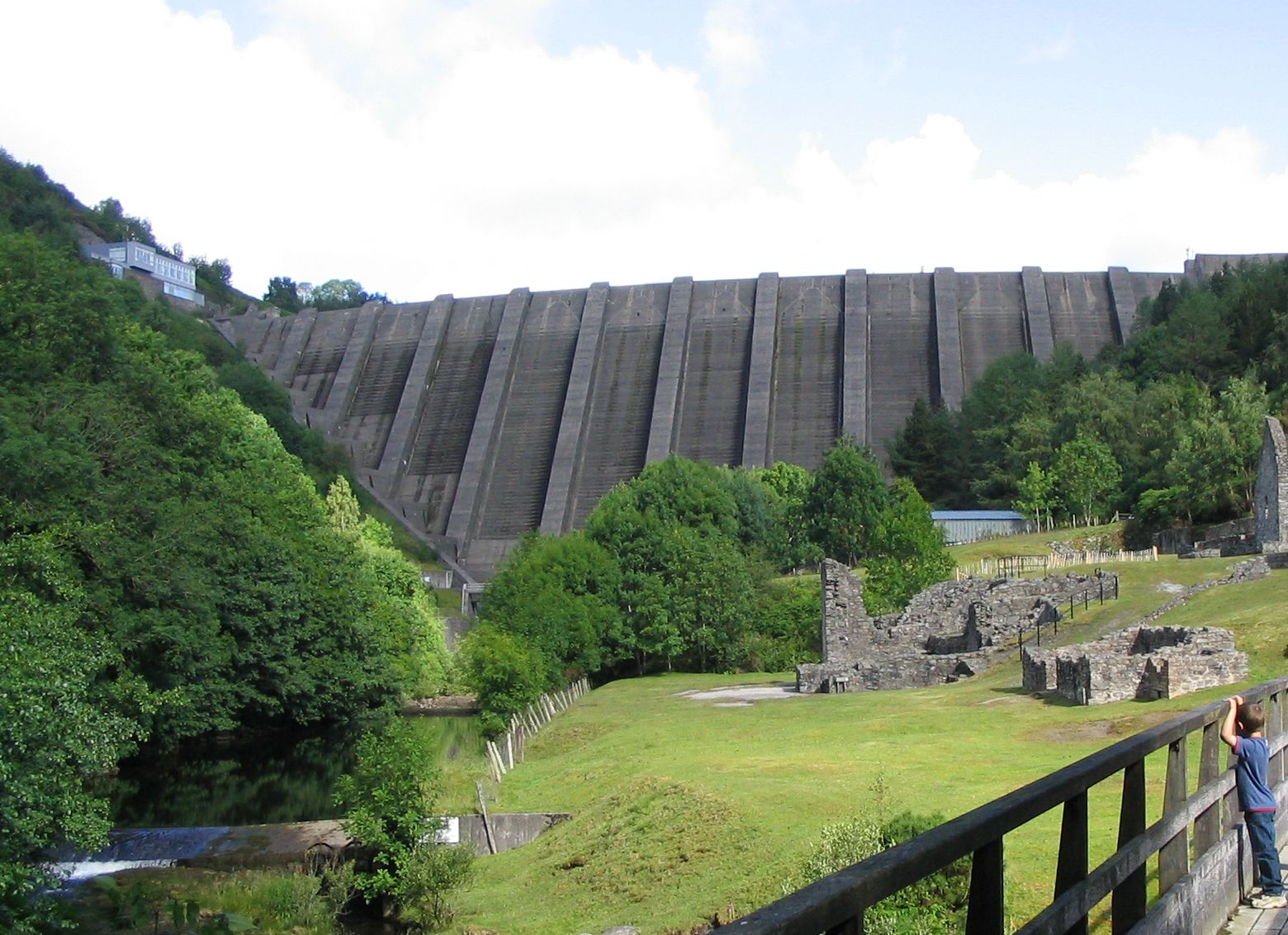
Bryntail and Clywedog reservoir dam, footbridge bottom left

There were three main shafts, Murray's, Gundry's and Western shaft. The majority of the scheduled buildings on the site are associated with Gundry's shaft, including a barytes mill, two crushing houses, ore bins, roasting ovens and water tanks. On the eastern dressing floor are jigger box placements, three buddles, two more ore bins and washing and picking floors. Other mine buildings include the manager's office, smithy, store buildings and a circular magazine, as well as the miners' footbridge.
