= Evan Davies (almanac-maker) =

Welsh philomath and almanac-maker

Evan Davies (fl. 1720 - 1750) was a Welsh philomath and almanac-maker. He came from the Manafon area of Montgomeryshire. The first of a series of almanacs ('Newyddion Mawr Oddiwrth y Ser' - News from the stars) produced by him was published by T. Durston of Shrewsbury in 1738. They are known to have contained a good selection of poetry, historical accounts, and local information.
