= Manafon =

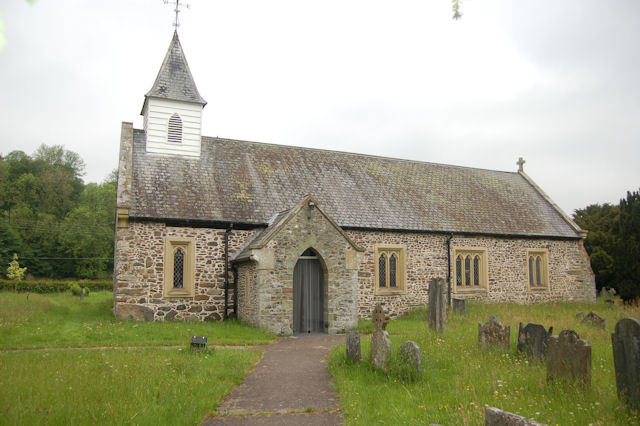
- St Michael's Church, Manafon
- Population: 301
- OS grid reference: SJ 1136 0239
  - Cardiff: 78.4 mi (126.2 km)
  - London: 155.3 mi (249.9 km)
- Community: Manafon
- Principal area: Powys
- Country: Wales
- Sovereign state: United Kingdom
- Post town: NEWTOWN
- Postcode district: SY16
- Post town: WELSHPOOL
- Postcode district: SY21
- Police: Dyfed-Powys
- Fire: Mid and West Wales
- Ambulance: Welsh
- UK Parliament: Montgomeryshire and Glyndŵr
- Senedd Cymru – Welsh Parliament: Montgomeryshire
- List of places UK Wales Powys 52.612044°N 3.310561°W Map of the community

Manafon is a small rural community located in the hills of Montgomeryshire, the Northern part of the Welsh county of Powys. The Parish focuses on the valley of the River Rhiew that runs west to east into the River Severn". The community of Manafon consists of "two main villages within about a mile of one another, Manafon and New Mills. The remainder of the population lives in scattered farms and dwellings and in the small rural settlement of The Green."

The village is 8 miles (13 km) from Welshpool, 78.4 miles (126.2 km) from Cardiff, and 155.3 miles (249.9 km) from London.

In 2011 the population of Manafon was 301 with 18.4% of them able to speak Welsh. Between 1841 and 1901 the population declined from 795 to 501.

The name was recorded in 1254 as Manauon with Mannavon in 1338, and "the modern spelling first appears early in the reign of Elizabeth, c.1566." Experts now suggest that it means "the ‘plain associated with Anafon’, where the first element is Welsh ma meaning ‘plain, field or place’ and the second a personal name", rather than afon meaning ‘river’, as in Stratford-upon-Avon, which was the earlier view.

== Manafon in 1833 ==
From A Topographical Dictionary of Wales by Samuel Lewis, 1833:

MANAVON, a parish in the lower division of the hundred of NEWTOWN, county of MONTGOMERY, NORTH WALES, 8 1/2 miles (W. S. W.) from Welshpool, containing 775 inhabitants. This parish is situated in a mountainous district nearly in the centre of the county, and is intersected by the river Rhiw, and also by the road leading from Llanvair to Newtown and Montgomery: it comprises an extensive tract of land, of which a considerable portion is uncultivated, and of the remainder, one-half consists of old enclosures, and the other has been enclosed and brought into a state of cultivation under the provisions of an act of parliament obtained in 1796. The surrounding scenery is strikingly diversified; and from the higher grounds are obtained extensive and pleasingly varied prospects. The manufacture of flannel is carried on to a limited extent.

== St Michael's Church ==
St Michael's and All Angels Church is an active Anglican church in the parish of Llanfair Caereinion, Llanllugan and Manafon, built in stone with slate roof. The church has been designated by Cadw as a Grade II* listed building. There is documentary evidence relating to a church on the site in 1254 and 1291 but otherwise nothing is known of its history until it was restored in 1859.

The walls almost certainly date back to the 15thC if not earlier and the 15thC roof remains. But apart from a Perpendicular east window and two re-set lights in the vestry, all the fenestration is Victorian, dating to a restoration of 1859, with further works in 1898 when the interior was re-ordered. Little of pre-19thC date survives inside.

And in 1869 Glynne wrote that "this church has been so completely renovated, as scarcely to retain any ancient features".

=== Notable vicars ===
Notable former vicars include the poets Gwallter Mechain and R. S. Thomas.

Gwallter Mechain (Walter of Mechain) was the bardic name of Walter Davies (1761 – 1849), who was a Welsh poet, editor, translator, antiquary and Anglican clergyman, born Llanfechain, Montgomeryshire. He went studied at Trinity College, Cambridge, where he received his MA in 1803. He was then awarded the living of Llanwyddelan and in 1807 became vicar of Manafon, where he remained for 30 years and did most of his literary work.

Davies was closely associated with the London Welsh, especially the Gwyneddigion Society, and the revival of the Cymmrodorion Society in 1820. He was a keen supporter of eisteddfodau, where he won many prizes, and he played an important role in establishing provincial eisteddfodic societies.

R. S. Thomas (1913 – 2000) was rector of Manafon from 1942 to 1954. It was during his time in Manafon that he began to study Welsh and published his first three volumes of poetry, The Stones of the Field (1946), An Acre of Land (1952) and The Minister (1953). Thomas's poetry achieved a breakthrough with the publication, in 1955, of his fourth book, Song at the Year's Turning, with an introduction by poet John Betjeman. This, in effect a collected edition of his first three volumes, was critically very well received.

=== Other notable residents ===
Evan Davies (almanac-maker) (fl. 1720 - 1750), philomath and almanac-maker.

== Music album Manafon ==
Manafon is a 2009 album by David Sylvian. It is an avant-garde work combining elements of free improvisation, experimental rock and chamber music. It reached rank No. 6 in The Wire's list of best 2009 albums. This album was inspired by the Welsh poet R. S. Thomas.

Manafon is indeed a village in Wales, a village in which Thomas lived for sometime and served as rector to the parish. In this small village, Thomas had trouble filling the pews of a Sunday but in a sense it was something of an idyllic spot in which to raise a child (a strict, taciturn and somewhat indifferent parent), master his profession and write his poetry. So, the physically real village became for me a metaphor for the poetic imagination.

== See also ==
- List of localities in Wales by population
- David Lloyd (judge) - Pennsylvania Chief Justice, born in Manafon
- John Griffiths (artist) - artist and friend of Lockwood Kipling, lived in Gwernydd, Manafon.
