= Afon Clywedog =

River in Powys, Wales

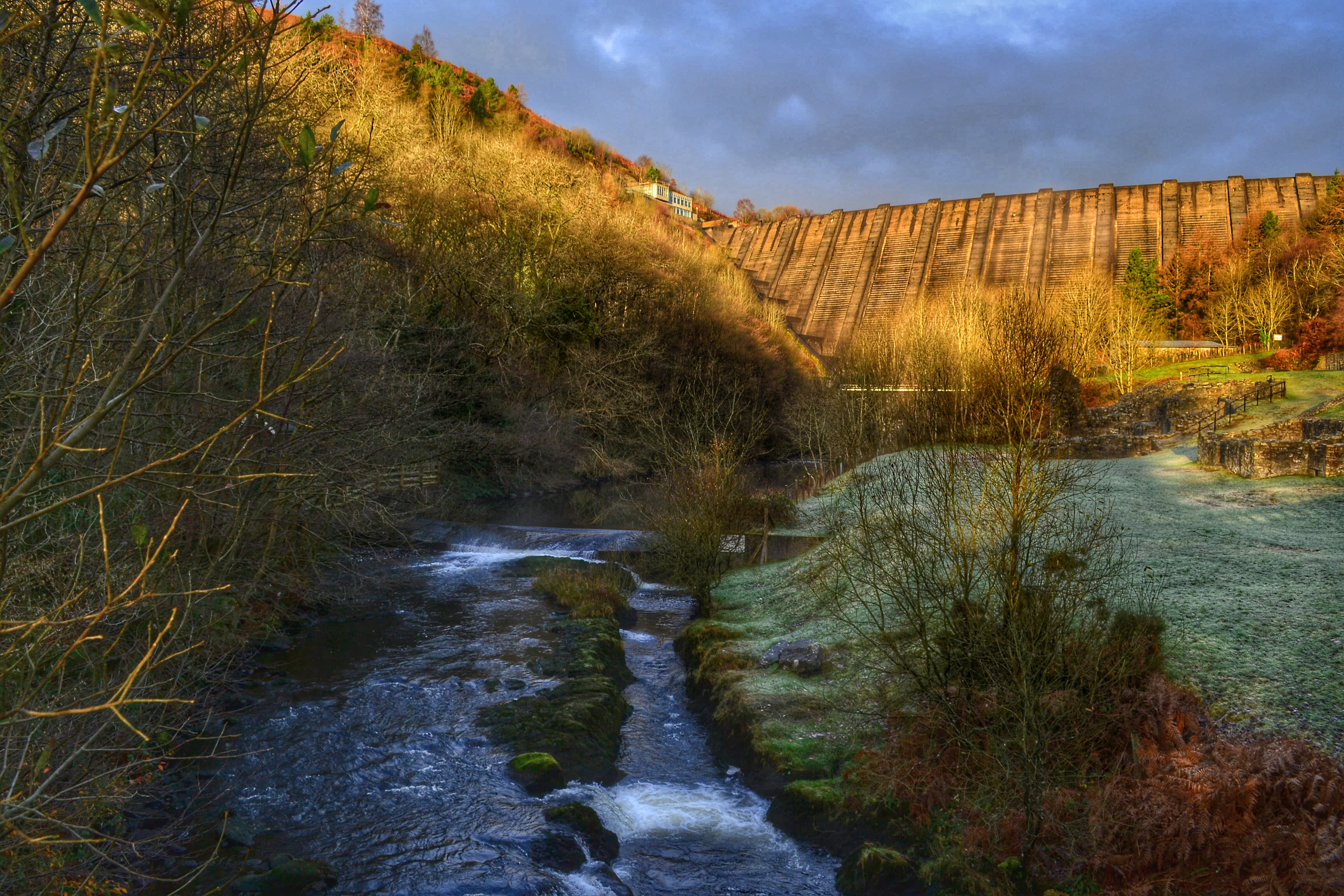
- Clywedog at the base of Clywedog reservoir

Location
- Sovereign state: United Kingdom
- Country: Wales
- County: Powys
- Settlement: Llanidloes, Staylittle

Physical characteristics
- Source
  - location: Plynlimon, Powys, Wales
  - coordinates: 52.5411°N 3.7168°W
- Mouth
  - location: River Severn, Llanidloes
  - coordinates: 52.4508°N 3.5406°W
- Length: 29.0 km (18.0 mi)
- Discharge
  - location: Llanidloes
  - average: 2.26 m^{3}/s (80 cu ft/s)

Afon Clywedog (Welsh for 'river Clywedog') is an upland headwater tributary of the River Severn in Powys, Wales. It is approximately 29 km (18 mi) long and has its source on the flanks of Plynlimon and has its confluence with the Severn in Llanidloes. The annual rainfall over the catchment is between 1,737 mm (68.4 in) and 1,836 mm (72.3 in).

== River regulation ==
A large part of the upper catchment of the river is inundated by the Clywedog reservoir which stores water from the catchment, especially during the winter months, and releases it during periods of low flow to support the flow in the Severn so that drinking water may be abstracted downstream. The management rules also enable the reservoir to maintain the reservoir below maximum level during the winter so that there is capacity to absorb flood flows to reduce the impact of flooding further down the main river. Afon Clywedog thus has a highly regulated flow with relatively high flow in dry conditions and reduced flow in wetter weather.

== See also ==
- Bryntail lead mine
- List of rivers in Wales
