= Glyndŵr's Way =

Long-distance footpath in Wales

Coordinates: 52.3443°N 3.0498°W

- Waymark and logo
- Length: 135 mi (217 km)
- Location: Wales
- Designation: National Trail
- Trailheads: Knighton; Welshpool
- Use: Hiking
- Elevation gain/loss: 23,629 ft (7,202 m)
- Highest point: Foel Fadian, 1,654 ft (504 m)
- Difficulty: Very challenging
- Website: www.nationaltrail.co.uk/en_GB/trails/glyndwrs-way/
Trail map

Glyndŵr's Way (Welsh: Llwybr Glyndŵr) is a long-distance footpath in mid-Wales. It is designated as a National Trail and runs for 135 miles (217 km) in an extended loop through Powys between Knighton and Welshpool, and anchored on Machynlleth to the west.

== History ==
Its name derives from the early-15th-century Welsh prince and folk hero Owain Glyndŵr, whose parliament sat in Machynlleth in 1404. Glyndŵr's Way was granted National Trail status in 2000 to mark the beginning of the third millennium and the 600th anniversary of an ill-fated but long-running and culturally significant rebellion in 1400.

== Route ==
The footpath officially begins in Knighton, on the English border, where it links with Offa's Dyke Path. Running in roughly a horseshoe shape, it passes small market towns such as Llanidloes and quiet villages including Abbeycwmhir and Llanbadarn Fynydd, traversing central mid-Wales to Machynlleth near the Dyfi estuary and returning across Wales via Llanbrynmair, Llangadfan and Lake Vyrnwy and the valley of the River Vyrnwy to Welshpool 4 miles (6.4 km) from the Wales–England border.

The route passes nationally important Welsh natural habitats such as sessile oak woodlands, upland mire and heath, and ancient hedgerows. The area from Staylittle to Aberhosan is noted for its heather moorlands.

== See also ==
- Long-distance footpaths in the United Kingdom
- National Trails
- Wales Coast Path
