= St Garmon's Church, Llanfechain =

Coordinates: 52.7753°N 3.2037°W

St Garmon's Church
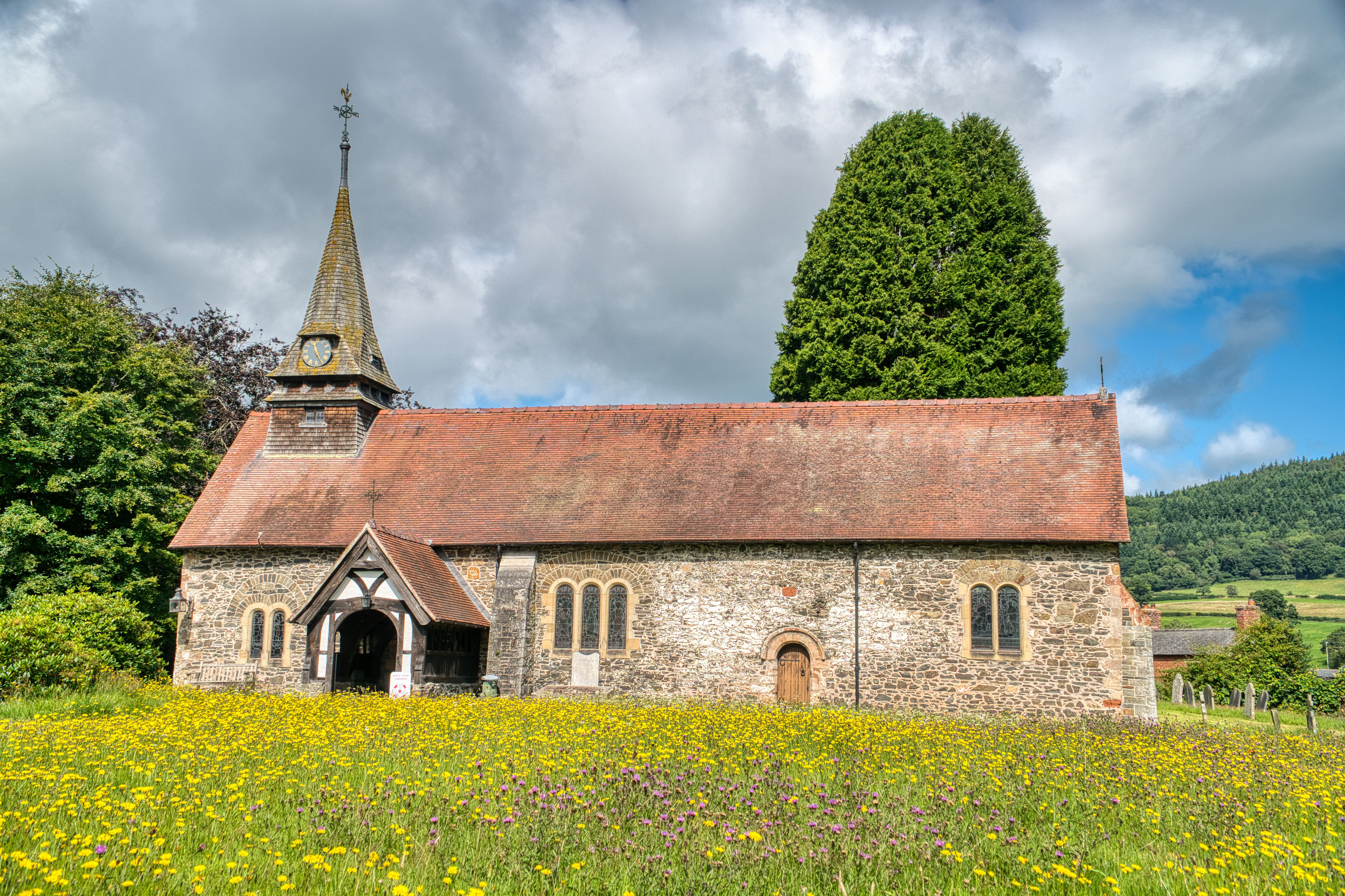
- St Garmon's Church
- OS grid reference: SJ 188,204
- Location: Llanfechain, Powys
- Country: Wales
- Denomination: Anglican
- Website: St Garmon's Church, Llanfechain

History
- Status: Parish church
- Dedication: St Garmon

Architecture
- Functional status: Active
- Heritage designation: Grade II*
- Architect(s): R. K. Penson, Douglas and Fordham
- Architectural type: Church
- Style: Norman
- Groundbreaking: 12th century
- Completed: 1883

Specifications
- Materials: Shale with sandstone dressings, red tile roof

Administration
- Province: Church in Wales
- Diocese: St Asaph
- Archdeaconry: Montgomery
- Deanery: Llanfyllin

Clergy
- Rector: Rev Pam Powell

St Garmon's Church, Llanfechain, is in the village of Llanfechain, Powys, Wales. It is an active Anglican parish church in the deanery of Llanfyllin, the archdeaconry of Montgomery, and the diocese of St Asaph, and is designated by Cadw as a Grade II* listed building. The church is traditionally associated with a 9th-century Celtic saint, St Garmon. St Garmon was most likely St Germanus (410–474), the first Bishop of Man. It shares it name with the church in the village of St Harmon in Radnorshire (Powys), where the diarist Francis Kilvert was a curate.

== History ==
The earliest documentary evidence relating to the church is in the Norwich Taxation of 1254 and its fabric dates from around this time. The roof dates from the 15th century and the south porch was added in the 17th century. Work was done on the church in 1852 but a larger restoration was carried out in 1859 under R. K. Penson when the vestry on the west wall was replaced by a new one on the north side. Changes were made to the gallery, the west gable was rebuilt, round-headed windows were inserted in the nave and the chancel, and a spire was added to the belfry. A further restoration took place in 1883 by the Chester firm of architects, Douglas and Fordham, who stripped plaster from the interior, removed the ceiling to expose the roof, and placed the pews with benches. The church was re-roofed with red tiles. In 1920 the bells were re-hung.

== Architecture ==
=== Exterior ===
The church is built in shale with sandstone dressings, and a red tile roof. Its plan consists of a nave and chancel with six bays in a single chamber, a vestry on the north near the west corner and a porch opposite it. Near the west end is a bell turret with a spire. At the chancel end and over the porch are metal cross finials. Above the bell turret is a slated broach spire which is surmounted by a weathercock. There is a clock face on the south side of the spire. On the east wall are three small windows, rather than the usual larger east window. The main door and a priest's door on the south wall are Norman. The other windows date from the 19th century. The window in the west wall is a "wheel window", with six lights and a central roundel, all in sandstone. The walls of the porch are timber-framed on stone plinths.

=== Interior ===
At the west end is a gallery. Two steps lead up from the nave to the chancel, which has a barrel ceiling. At the east end is an oak reredos dating from 1890. The font is probably Tudor and it was damaged during the Civil War. The pulpit is dated 1636 and the communion table has Jacobean carving. There is a ring of three bells which were hung in the 1730s.

== External features ==
The churchyard is circular in shape. It contains a sundial dating from the 18th century which is listed at Grade II. Also in the churchyard to the north of the church is a raised mound of earth, Twmpath Garmon, which is traditionally held to be the preaching mound of St Garmon. The lych gate is also listed at Grade II. To the southeast of the village is a holy well, Ffynnon Garmon, which is also associated with the saint.

== Present day ==
The church holds services every Sunday and during the week. Other services are arranged as required. The Pathfinders meet weekly and the Mothers' Union monthly.

== See also ==
- List of church restorations, amendments and furniture by John Douglas
