= Llan, Powys =

Coordinates: 52.59370°N 3.649°W

Llan
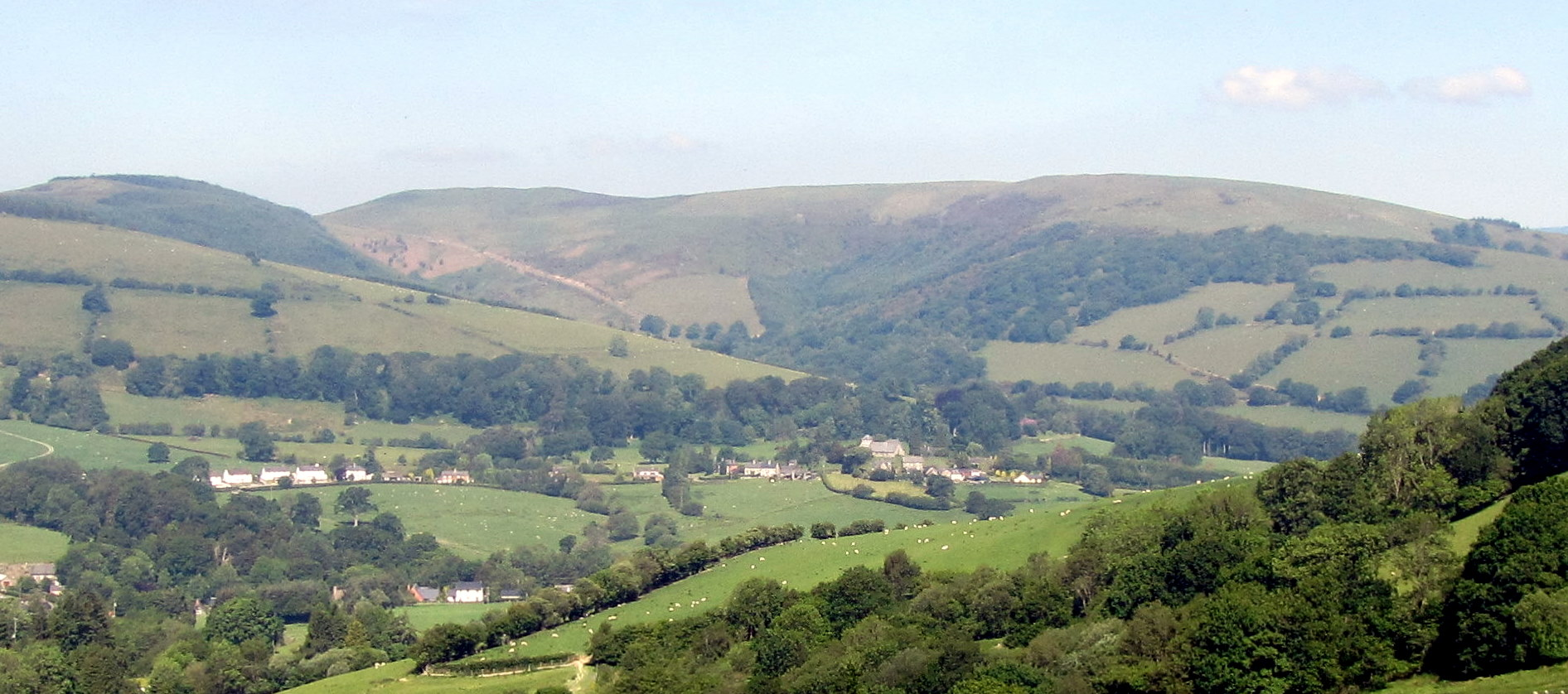
- View of Llan from Newydd Fynyddog.

- Location within Powys
- Population: 40
- OS grid reference: SH745005
- Principal area: Powys
- Preserved county: Powys
- Country: Wales
- Sovereign state: United Kingdom
- Post town: Llanbrynmair
- Postcode district: SY19
- Dialling code: 01650
- Police: Dyfed-Powys
- Fire: Mid and West Wales
- Ambulance: Welsh
- UK Parliament: Montgomeryshire and Glyndŵr
- Senedd Cymru – Welsh Parliament: Montgomeryshire

Llan is a village in Powys, Wales, located on the B4518 road to Llanidloes, 1.5 miles (2.4 km) from Llanbrynmair.

The parish church of St Mary is located here.

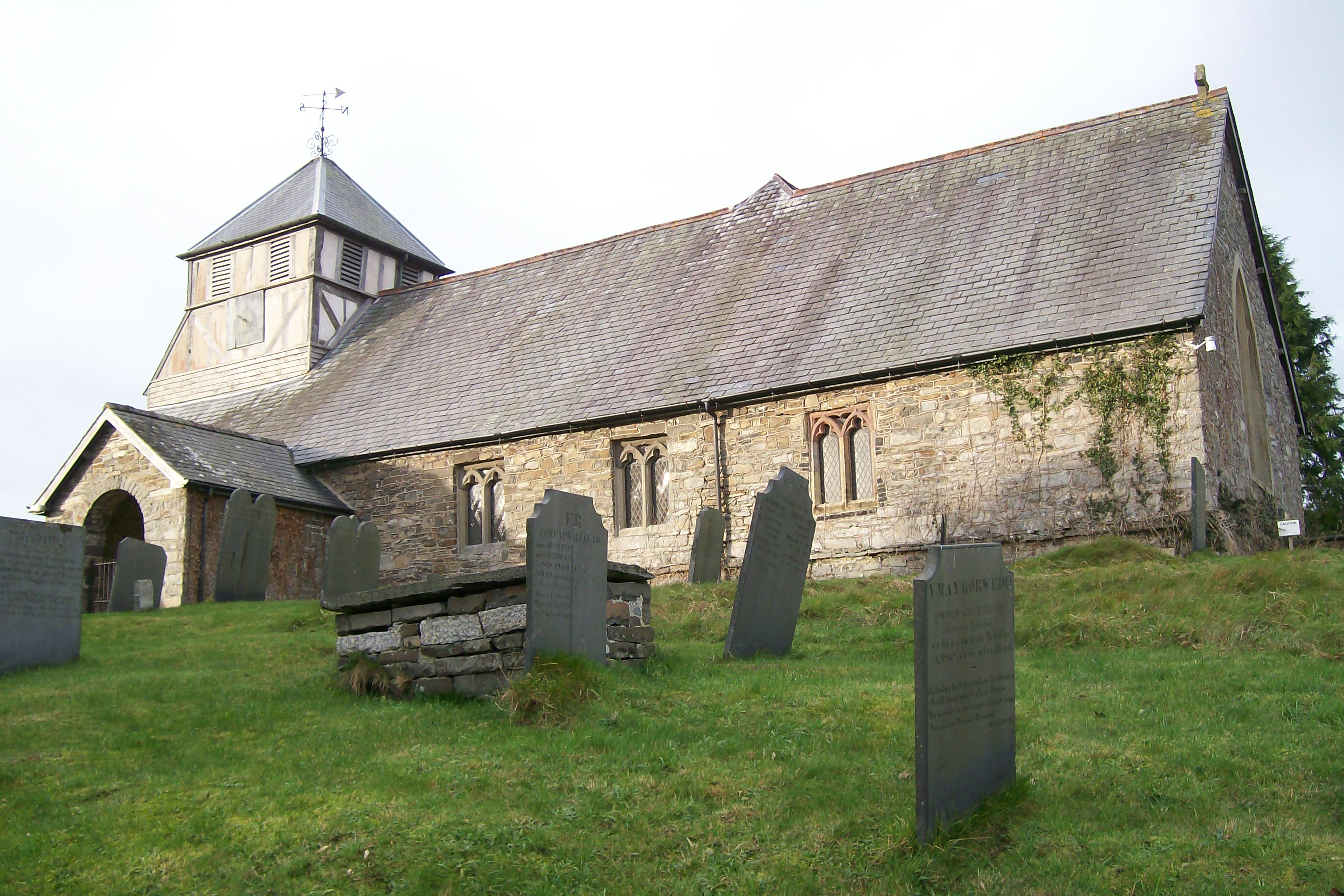
St Mary's parish church

This area was the original centre of Llanbrynmair up to the early to mid 19th century. At this time the community relocated to its current location at the junction of the A470 & B4518 as a result of the new turnpike road opening (built in 1821) and the arrival of the railway in 1861.
