= B4518 road =

Road in Powys, Wales

B4518
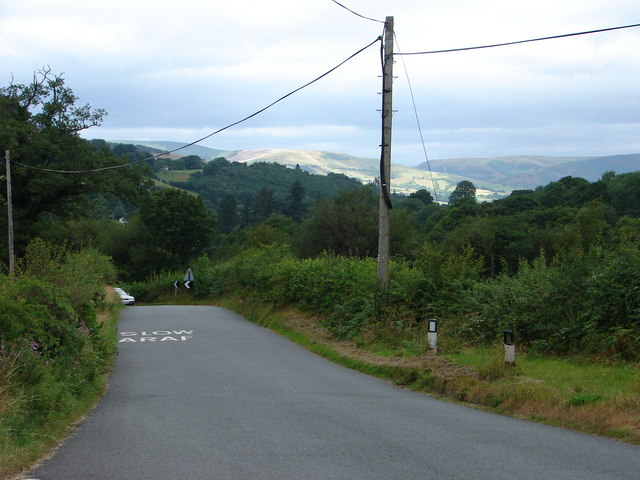

Route information
- Length: 30.5 mi (49.1 km)

Major junctions
- Southeast end: Rhayader
- A470 road
- Northwest end: Llanbrynmair

Location
- Country: United Kingdom

Road network
- Roads in the United Kingdom; Motorways; A and B road zones

The B4518 road is a road in Powys, central Wales, with a total length of 30.5 miles (49.1 km). It begins at 52°18′5″N 3°30′41″W in Rhayader near the junction of the A470 road and the A44 road and leads eventually to the A470 again at Llanbrynmair at 52°36′42″N 3°37′38″W. En route going north from Rhayader it passes through the following settlements: St Harmon, Pant-y-Dwr, Tylwch, Llanidloes (where it crosses the A470 again), Staylittle, Pont Crugnant, Pennant, Bont Dolgadfan, Llan and Plas Esgair. It passes through the Clywedog Valley and Clywedog Reservoir, built in 1964.
