= Beggar's Bush, Powys =

Coordinates: 52.270061°N 3.081943°W

Beggar's Bush
- Location within Powys
- OS grid reference: SO 2627 6410
  - Cardiff: 55 mi (89 km)
  - London: 137 mi (220 km)
- Community: Old Radnor
- Principal area: Powys
- Country: Wales
- Sovereign state: United Kingdom
- Post town: PRESTEIGNE
- Postcode district: LD8
- Police: Dyfed-Powys
- Fire: Mid and West Wales
- Ambulance: Welsh
- UK Parliament: Brecon, Radnor and Cwm Tawe
- Senedd Cymru – Welsh Parliament: Brecon and Radnorshire

Beggar's Bush is a hamlet in the community of Old Radnor, Powys, Wales, located 55 miles (89 km) from Cardiff and 137 miles (220 km) from London. A round barrow is situated nearby, known as "Beggar’s Bush Barrow" (grid reference SO 2608 6418). The first recorded use of the name dates back to 1698.

== See also ==
- List of localities in Wales by population
