= Ysgol Bro Hyddgen =

Coordinates: 52.5891°N 3.8551°W

- Machynlleth, Powys, SY20 8DR; Wales

Information
- Established: 2014
- Local authority: Powys
- Chair of Governors: Elwyn Vaughan
- Headteacher: Dafydd M B Jones
- Gender: mixed
- Age: 4 to 19
- Enrolment: 441 (2023)
- Publication: Ein Bro ('Our area')
- Sixth Form: 86 (2018)
- Language: Bilingual (Type A)
- Website: https://brohyddgen.cymru/

Ysgol Bro Hyddgen is a bilingual, all-age (4-19) school situated in Machynlleth, Powys.

The school is a combination of two previous schools, namely Machynlleth C.P. School and Ysgol Bro Ddyfi secondary school. The name 'Hyddgen' refers to the place of the first battle victory of Owain Glyndŵr in 1401, several miles east of Machynlleth. School pupils and Machynlleth Town Council unsuccessfully argued that the school should keep the name Ysgol Bro Ddyfi.

As of 2023, there were 441 pupils on roll at the school.

38% of pupils come from Welsh-speaking homes, with 44% of pupils being able to speak Welsh fluently.
