= SY postcode area =

Postcode area within the United Kingdom

Shrewsbury
- Postcode area
- Coordinates: 52.665°N 3.053°W
- Country: United Kingdom
- Postcode area: SY
- Postcode area name: Shrewsbury
- Post towns: 32
- Postcode districts: 26
- Postcode sectors: 86
- Postcodes (live): 14,402
- Postcodes (total): 17,187
- Statistics as at May 2020

The SY postcode area, also known as the Shrewsbury postcode area, is a group of 25 postcode districts in the West Midlands and Mid Wales, with small areas in North West England and North Wales. Together the districts cover most of Shropshire, north Powys, north Ceredigion, and part of south Cheshire. In addition, the SY7 and SY8 districts cover a small part of north Herefordshire, and the SY14 and SY20 districts also contain very small parts of Gwynedd and Wrexham County Borough respectively. The postcode area contains 32 post towns.

Mail for the SY postcode area is processed at Chester Mail Centre, along with mail for the CH and LL postcode areas.

== Post towns ==
- Aberystwyth
- Bishop's Castle
- Borth
- Bow Street
- Bucknell
- Caersws
- Church Stretton
- Craven Arms
- Ellesmere
- Llanbrynmair
- Llandinam
- Llanfechain
- Llanfyllin
- Llanidloes
- Llanon
- Llanrhystud
- Llansantffraid
- Llanymynech
- Ludlow
- Lydbury North
- Machynlleth
- Malpas
- Meifod
- Montgomery
- Newtown
- Oswestry
- Shrewsbury
- Talybont
- Tregaron
- Welshpool
- Whitchurch
- Ystrad Meurig

== Coverage ==
The approximate coverage of the postcode districts:

Postcode district	Post town	Coverage	Local authority area(s)
SY1	SHREWSBURY	Shrewsbury (north and town centre)	Shropshire
SY2	SHREWSBURY	Shrewsbury (east)	Shropshire
SY3	SHREWSBURY	Shrewsbury (south and west), Bayston Hill	Shropshire
SY4	SHREWSBURY	Baschurch, Bomere Heath, Nesscliffe, Ruyton-XI-Towns Shawbury, Wem	Shropshire
SY5	SHREWSBURY	Atcham, Cressage, Criggion, Condover, Minsterley, Pontesbury, Ratlinghope, Westbury, Wroxeter	Shropshire, Powys
SY6	CHURCH STRETTON	Church Stretton, Cardington	Shropshire
SY7	BUCKNELL	Bucknell, Lingen	Shropshire, Herefordshire
SY7	CRAVEN ARMS	Craven Arms, Clun Valley, Diddlebury, Leintwardine, Munslow, Tugford	Shropshire, Herefordshire
SY7	LYDBURY NORTH	Lydbury North	Shropshire
SY8	LUDLOW	Ludlow, Brimfield, Clee Hill, Culmington, Leinthall Starkes, Richard's Castle, Stoke St. Milborough	Shropshire, Herefordshire
SY9	BISHOPS CASTLE	Bishop's Castle, Wentnor	Shropshire
SY10	OSWESTRY	Oswestry (outskirts), Gobowen, Llansilin, Llangedwyn, Llanrhaeadr-ym-Mochnant, Pen-y-bont-fawr, Llanwddyn	Shropshire, Powys
SY11	OSWESTRY	Oswestry (most of), St Martin's, West Felton	Shropshire
SY12	ELLESMERE	Ellesmere, Dudleston Heath (Criftins), Welshampton, Lyneal, Colemere, Cockshutt, English Frankton, Tetchill, Hordley, Bagley	Shropshire
SY13	WHITCHURCH	Whitchurch, Whixall	Shropshire
SY14	MALPAS	Malpas, Tilston, No Man's Heath, Bickley, Hampton, Shocklach, Bulkeley, Bickerton, Cuddington Heath, Cholmondeley, Threapwood, Barton, Duckington	Cheshire West and Chester, Cheshire East, Wrexham
SY15	MONTGOMERY	Montgomery, Abermule, Chirbury, Church Stoke	Powys, Shropshire
SY16	NEWTOWN	Newtown, Tregynon, Bettws Cedewain	Powys
SY17	CAERSWS	Caersws, Trefeglwys, Carno, Llanwnnog, Pontdolgoch, Clatter	Powys
SY17	LLANDINAM	Llandinam	Powys
SY18	LLANIDLOES	Llanidloes, Llangurig, Van, Tylwch	Powys
SY19	LLANBRYNMAIR	Llanbrynmair, Llan, Bont Dolgadfan, Dolfach, Talerddig, Staylittle, Pennant, Dylife	Powys
SY20	MACHYNLLETH	Machynlleth, Corris	Powys, Gwynedd
SY21	WELSHPOOL	Welshpool, Marton, Stockton	Powys, Shropshire
SY22	LLANFECHAIN	Llanfechain	Powys, Shropshire
SY22	LLANFYLLIN	Llanfyllin	Powys, Shropshire
SY22	LLANSANFFRAID	Llansantffraid-ym-Mechain	Powys, Shropshire
SY22	LLANYMYNECH	Llanymynech	Powys, Shropshire
SY22	MEIFOD	Meifod	Powys, Shropshire
SY23	ABERYSTWYTH	Aberystwyth, Llanbadarn Fawr, Penparcau	Ceredigion, Powys
SY23	LLANON	Llanon	Ceredigion, Powys
SY23	LLANRHYSTUD	Llanrhystud	Ceredigion, Powys
SY24	BORTH	Borth	Ceredigion
SY24	BOW STREET	Bow Street, Pen-y-garn, Rhydypennau, Llandre	Ceredigion
SY24	TALYBONT	Talybont	Ceredigion
SY25	YSTRAD MEURIG	Ystrad Meurig	Ceredigion, Powys
SY25	TREGARON	Tregaron	Ceredigion, Powys
SY99	SHREWSBURY	Jobcentre Plus	non-geographic

== Map ==
SY postcode area map, showing postcode districts in red and post towns in grey text, with links to nearby CH, CW, DY, HR, LD, LL, SA, TF, WR and WV postcode areas.

== See also ==
- Postcode Address File
- List of postcode areas in the United Kingdom
