= Gwallter Mechain =

Welsh poet, editor, translator, antiquary and Anglican clergyman

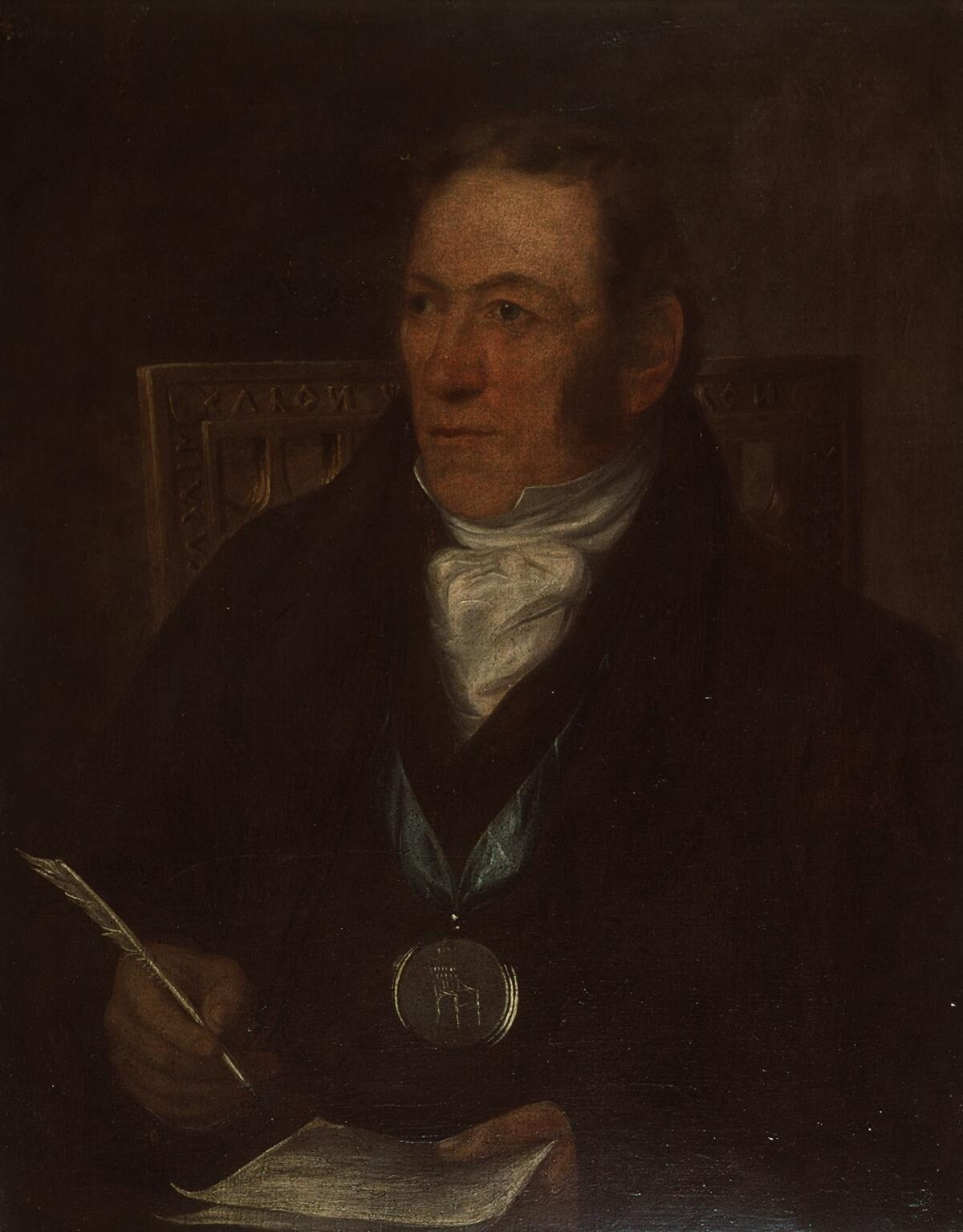
- Portrait of Gwallter Mechain, from a collection at the National Library of Wales
- Born: Walter Davies; 15 July 1761; Llanfechain, Montgomeryshire, Wales
- Died: 5 December 1849 (aged 88)
- Occupations: Anglican clergyman, poet and antiquary
- Writing career
- Language: Welsh

Walter Davies (15 July 1761 – 5 December 1849), commonly known by his bardic name Gwallter Mechain ("Walter of Mechain"), was a Welsh poet, editor, translator, antiquary and Anglican clergyman.

Davies was born at Y Wern, near Tomen y Castell, Llanfechain, Montgomeryshire. He was educated at the village school and was to become a cooper, but with the help of the poet Owain Myfyr went to All Souls College, Oxford, graduating in 1795. He took Holy Orders and became a Church of England curate in the parish of Meifod, Montgomeryshire, moving in 1799 to Ysbyty Ifan, Denbighshire where he met and married his wife Mary. He went on to study at Trinity College, Cambridge, gaining his MA in 1803. He was awarded the living of Llanwyddelan, Montgomeryshire and became rector of Manafon, Montgomeryshire where he remained for 30 years and did most of his literary work.

In 1797 he had begun a survey of the agriculture and economy of North Wales, which was published in two volumes in 1810 and 1813. This was followed in 1815 by a report on South Wales in collaboration with Iolo Morganwg (Edward Williams). He contributed to Samuel Lewis's Topographical Dictionary of Wales (1833).

In 1837, he moved to the parish of Llanrhaeadr-ym-Mochnant, where he died in 1849 and lies buried in the parish churchyard.

Davies was closely associated with the London Welsh, especially the Gwyneddigion Society, and the revival of the Cymmrodorion Society in 1820. He was a keen supporter of eisteddfodau, where he won many prizes, and he played an important role in establishing provincial eisteddfodic societies.
