= Dolfach =

Coordinates: 52.60229°N 3.60748°W

- Location within Powys
- OS grid reference: SH912017
- Principal area: Powys
- Preserved county: Powys
- Country: Wales
- Sovereign state: United Kingdom
- Post town: LLANBRYNMAIR
- Postcode district: SY19
- Dialling code: 01650
- Police: Dyfed-Powys
- Fire: Mid and West Wales
- Ambulance: Welsh
- UK Parliament: Montgomeryshire and Glyndŵr
- Senedd Cymru – Welsh Parliament: Montgomeryshire

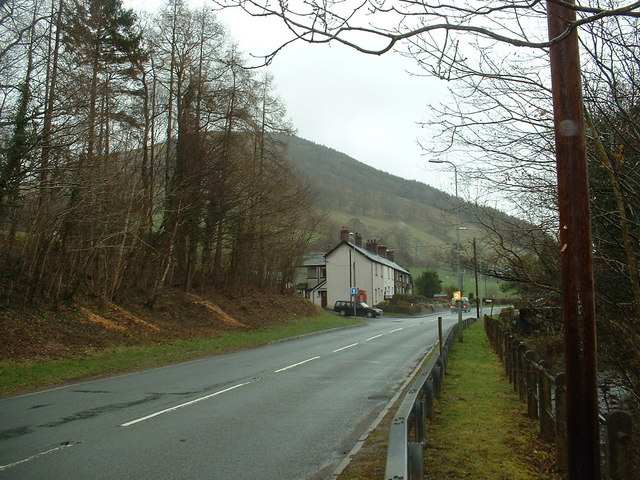
Dolfach village

Dolfach is a village in Powys, Wales, located on the main A470 road between Llanbrynmair and Talerddig. The village's name translates as "small meadow".
