= Rhys Meirion =

Welsh singer (born 1966)

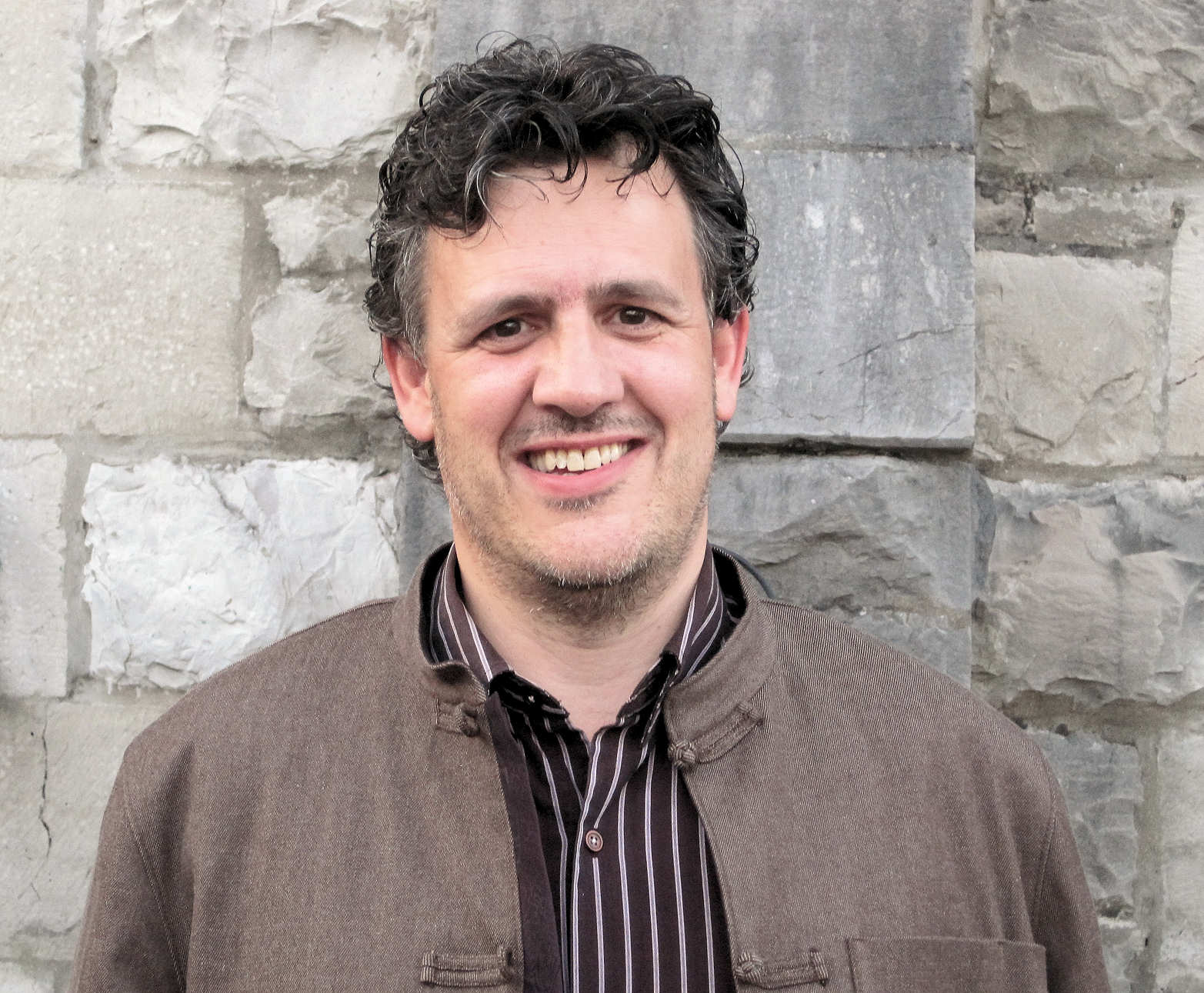

Background information
- Born: Rhys Meirion; 24 February 1966 (age 60); Blaenau Ffestiniog, Gwynedd
- Genres: Opera
- Occupation: Classical Tenor
- Instrument: Vocals
- Label: Sain
- Website: rhysmeirion.com

Rhys Meirion singing the Welsh lullaby Suo Gân (opening)

Rhys Meirion is a Welsh opera and classical tenor singer. He was born on 24 February 1966 in Blaenau Ffestiniog, Gwynedd. He joined the English National Opera in 1999 and became a company principal from 2001 to 2004. He has also sung leading roles at Oper Frankfurt, West Australian Opera and Opera Australia. His album Benedictus with the bass-baritone Bryn Terfel was nominated for a Classical Brit Award in 2006.

== Biography ==
Rhys Meirion was born on 24 February 1966 in Blaenau Ffestiniog, Gwynedd, and was brought up in Tremadog. He studied at Trinity College, Carmarthen, where he graduated as a Bachelor of Education before working as a primary school teacher at Ysgol Pentrecelyn near Ruthin.

Meirion won the Blue Ribband at the 1996 National Eisteddfod of Wales and the Towyn Roberts Scholarship at the 1997 event.

In 1997 he left his job as headmaster of Pentrecelyn school to study on the opera course at the Guildhall School of Music and Drama in London, where he studied with Gerald Moore.

=== Career ===
In 1999, Meirion joined English National Opera, initially joining the Jerwood Young Singers programme. He was a company principal at the opera company from 2001 to 2004, where he sang most of the leading operatic tenor roles including Rodolfo in La Boheme and Pinkerton in Madam Butterfly. He also sang Alfredo in La Traviata, Nemorino in L'Elisir d'Amore, Nadir in The Pearl Fishers, Marcello in Leoncavallo's La bohème, Duke in Rigoletto, Tebaldo in I Capuleti e i Montecchi, Tamino in The Magic Flute, the title role in Ernani, Sailor in Tristan und Isolde, Rinuccio in Gianni Schicchi, Italian Singer in Der Rosenkavalier, Froh in Das Rheingold and Zinovy in Lady Macbeth of Mtzensk.

In 2002, Meirion made his Australian debut as Rodolfo in La Boheme for West Australian Opera, and his European debut as Rodolfo for Städtische Bühnen Frankfurt. In 2004 he sang the title role in Gounod's Faust with the Hong Kong Amateur Opera Society.

Meirion's concert engagements have included his BBC Proms debut at the opening night of the 2001 season, a gala concert with Bryn Terfel at the Royal Albert Hall, London, the Desert Island Discs Anniversary Concert at the Royal Festival Hall, London, and a BBC recording of Beethoven's 9th Symphony conducted by Richard Hickox. He has also appeared at the Henley Festival, Cheltenham Music Festival, North Wales International Music Festival, Swansea Festival.

Meirion and Shân Cothi contributed to 'Beneath the Waves' by Kompendium, a project led by Rob Reed, keyboardist in progressive rock band Magenta.

=== Personal life ===
Meirion lives in the village of Pwllglas near Ruthin and is married to Nia. They have three children.

== Recordings ==
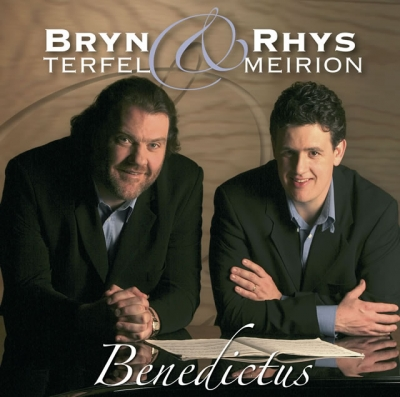
Album cover of Benedictus, with Bryn Terfel

Meirion has released three solo CD recordings on the Welsh record label Sain, and one on the Australian label Stanza AV. His duet album with the bass-baritone Bryn Terfel, Catrin Finch on the harp and Annette Bryn Parry on the piano, is one of Sain's best selling recordings.
