= Afon Twymyn =

River in Powys, Mid Wales

Coordinates: 52°38′N 3°44′W

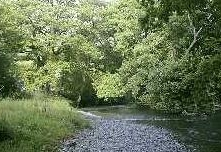
- Afon Twymyn at Cringoed, looking downstream

Location
- Country: Wales
- Region: Powys

Physical characteristics
- Source: Esgair Lwyd, Plynlimon, Powys, Wales
  - elevation: 480 m (1,570 ft)
- Mouth
  - location: River Dyfi, Cemmaes Road

The Afon Twymyn (English: River Twymyn) is a river in Powys, Mid Wales.

From its source close to Dylife and head of the Pennant Valley, the river flows through Llanbrynmair before joining the River Dyfi upstream of Cemmaes Road.

== See also ==
- Dylife Gorge
