= Dylife =

Coordinates: 52.532°N 3.6798°W

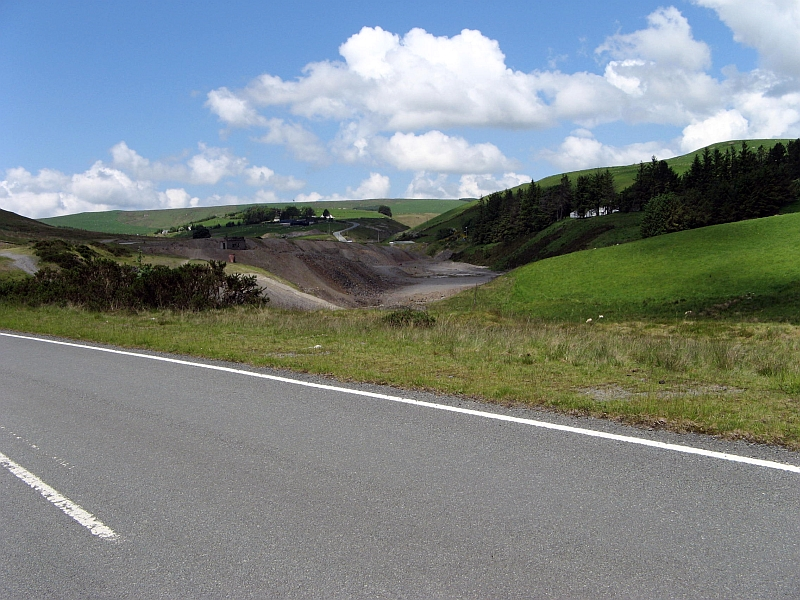
- Approaching Dylife

- Location within Powys
- OS grid reference: SN863940
- Community: Llanbrynmair
- Principal area: Powys
- Preserved county: Powys
- Country: Wales
- Sovereign state: United Kingdom
- Post town: LLANBRYNMAIR
- Postcode district: SY19
- Dialling code: 01650
- Police: Dyfed-Powys
- Fire: Mid and West Wales
- Ambulance: Welsh
- UK Parliament: Montgomeryshire and Glyndŵr
- Senedd Cymru – Welsh Parliament: Montgomeryshire

Dylife (/dəˈliːvɛ/ pronunciation guide) is a former mining settlement in Powys, Wales, located at the head of Afon Twymyn in the Cambrian Mountains, one mile west of the road between Llanidloes and Llanbrynmair (B4518). It is in the historic county of Montgomeryshire. The nearby lead mines intermittently sustained mining communities from Roman times until the early 20th century. During the late 19th century, as mining declined after the 1860s so did Dylife's population. The remaining buildings are two former chapels converted into homes and the Star Inn.

== Mining ==
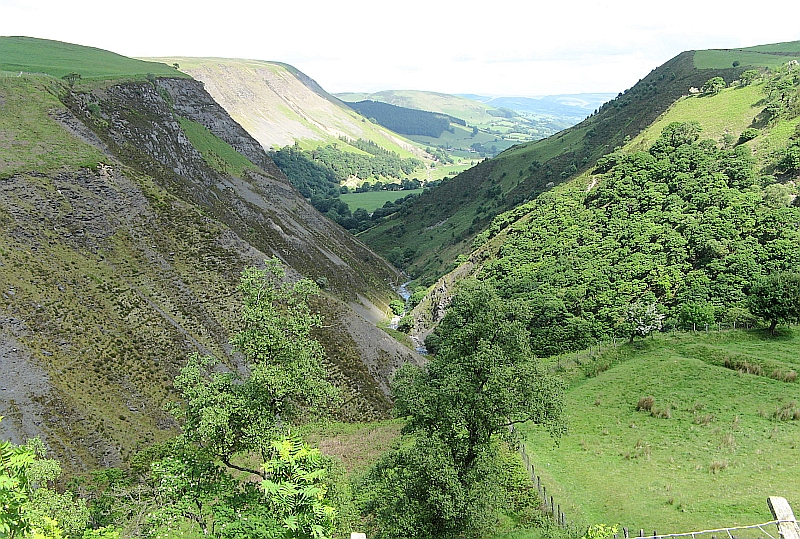
Dylife Gorge

Lead mining around Dylife took place in Roman times (there is a Roman fort on nearby Penycrocbren) and recommenced in the 17th century on a small scale until the early 19th century. In 1809, the two managers, Hugh Williams and John Pughe, started to negotiate for the lease which they obtained in 1815. The two men operated the mines until the 1850s, although not harmoniously.

The mines were expanded with new shafts and machinery was brought in to assist productivity by bringing ore to the surface, pumping out the shafts and processing the ore on the surface. Large waterwheels provided the power source, including Rhod Goch (Red Wheel), which, at 63 feet in diameter, was one of the largest in Britain.

The high price of lead and the low wages paid to the workers, compensated for high transport costs over difficult country to the nearest port at Derwenlas on the Afon Dyfi.

The difficulties between the operators, Williams and Pughe, eventually led to the sale of their mining interests to The Dylife Mining Co. Ltd in 1858. Two prominent politicians, Richard Cobden, Williams' son-in-law, and John Bright, were involved in the transfer. In the next few years, conditions greatly improved at the mines. New vertical shafts, lifts, cable systems to move ore to the processing areas and waterwheels to power them were installed as were changing rooms for the workers, a highly innovative change for the time. In 1864, the new railway from Aberystwyth to Shrewsbury, with a relatively easily accessible station at Llanbrynmair, provided an easier route to the smelters in north-west England.

From 22 tons in 1809, production peaked in 1862 at 2571 tons and declined thereafter. The price of lead also declined and as the mines' profitability dropped, the owners sold up in 1873. In 1884, two companies having failed to make a success of them, the mines were closed. "Informal" and small-scale efforts were made until 1901 to continue production. Thereafter, they finally closed and soon became flooded.

== Community ==
From the 1850s, Dylife became a more permanent, settled community with a church, chapels and a school; services were provided by three inns, one of which also had a grocery and butchery, a smithy and a post office. There were also visiting traders and a monthly fair. The company was obliged to house its workers and there were rows of cottages at Rhanc-y-mynydd, towards the western end of the village, and at Bryn Golau. About 300 workers – men, women and children – were employed at the mines in the 1850s. By 1864 the population was about 1000.

Health services are not recorded but it is likely that lead pollution affected the population.

After 1864, as the mines declined, so did the population, moving to more secure work elsewhere. Some stayed on after the final closure in 1901, but the school closed in 1925 and the last baptism was celebrated at the church in 1926 – it was demolished in 1962. The last pub, the Star, remains in business.
