= Clywedog Reservoir =

Reservoir in the United Kingdom

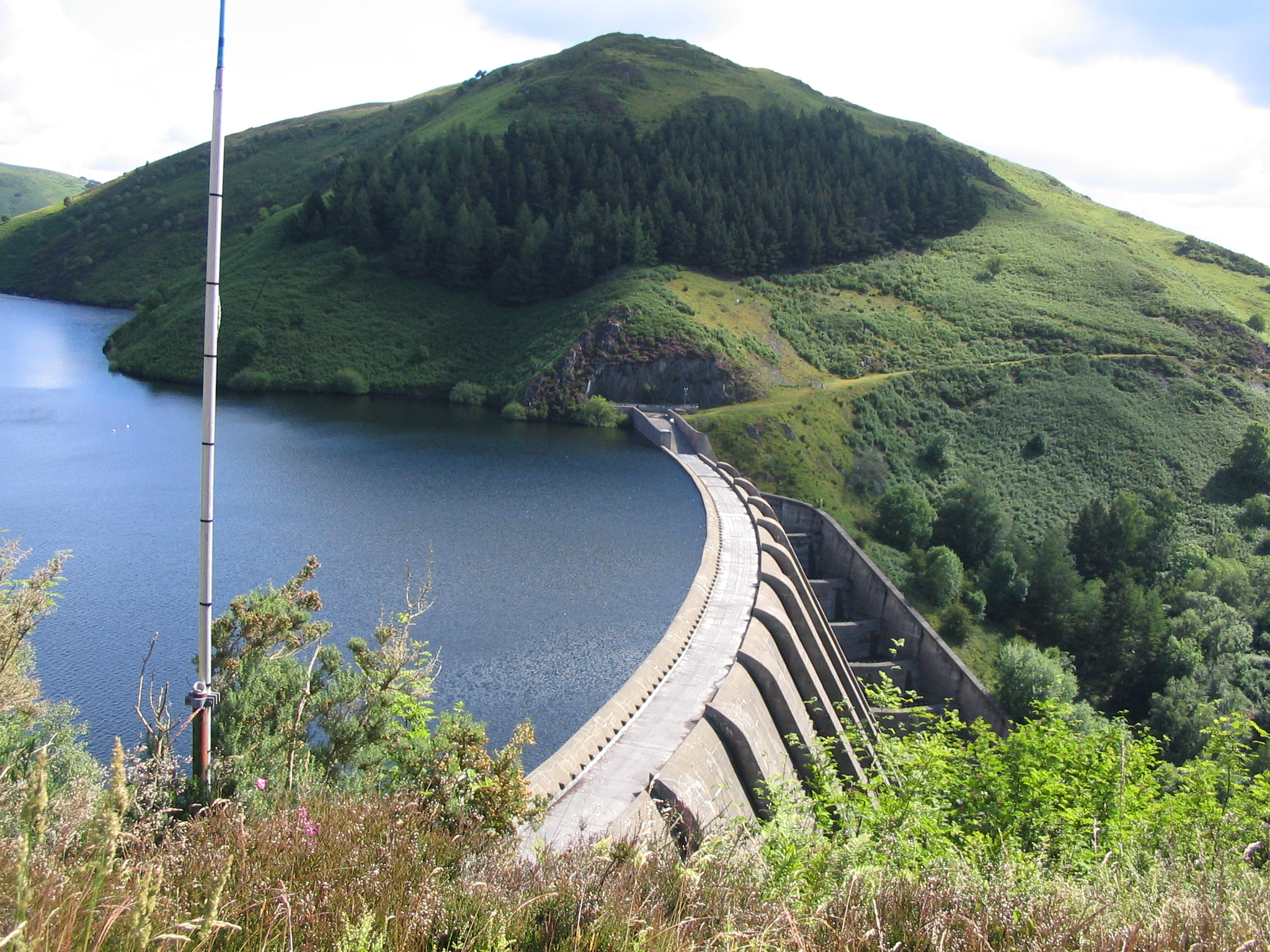
- Clywedog Reservoir

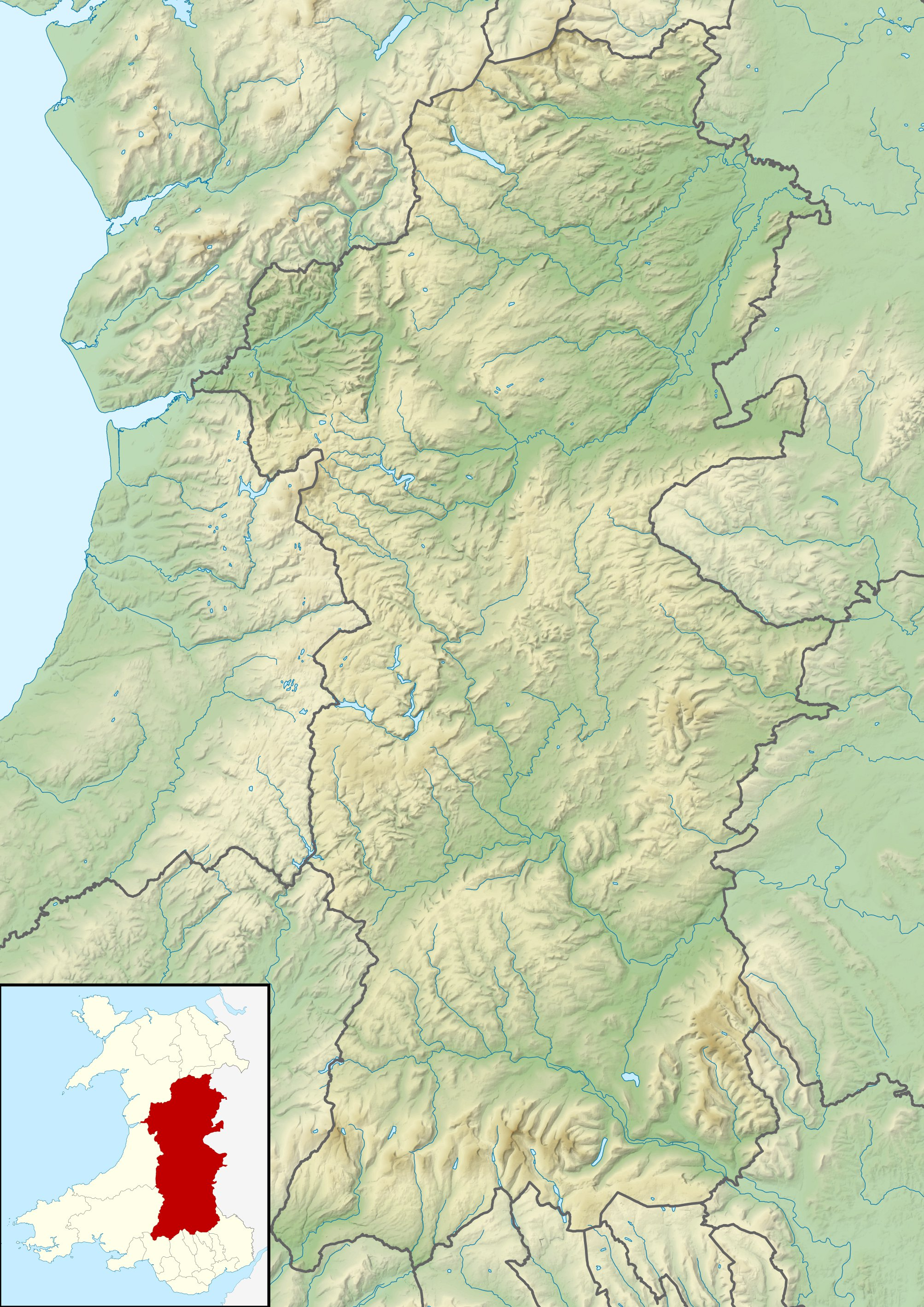
- Location within Powys
- Location: Llanidloes, Powys; Trefeglwys, Powys
- Coordinates: 52°29′10″N 3°37′30″W
- Type: reservoir
- Primary inflows: Afon Clywedog
- Primary outflows: Afon Clywedog
- Basin countries: Wales
- Max. length: 9.5 km (5.9 mi)
- Surface area: 2.5 km^{2} (0.97 sq mi)
- Max. depth: 66 m (217 ft)
- Water volume: 50,000 megalitres (41,000 acre⋅ft)

The Clywedog Reservoir (Welsh: Llyn Clywedog) is a reservoir near Llanidloes, Wales on the head-waters of the River Severn. The construction of the reservoir was enabled by an act of Parliament, the Clywedog Reservoir Joint Authority Act 1963 (c. xxxi), which asserted that "At certain times the flow of water in the river is inadequate ... unless that flow were regulated so as to ensure that at those times water in addition to the natural flow will flow down the river."

== Purpose ==
Its primary purpose was to regulate the flow in the River Severn to mitigate flooding and provide support for drinking water abstractions for the West Midlands. It was completed in 1967 and is situated near the B4518 road north of Llanidloes, Powys.

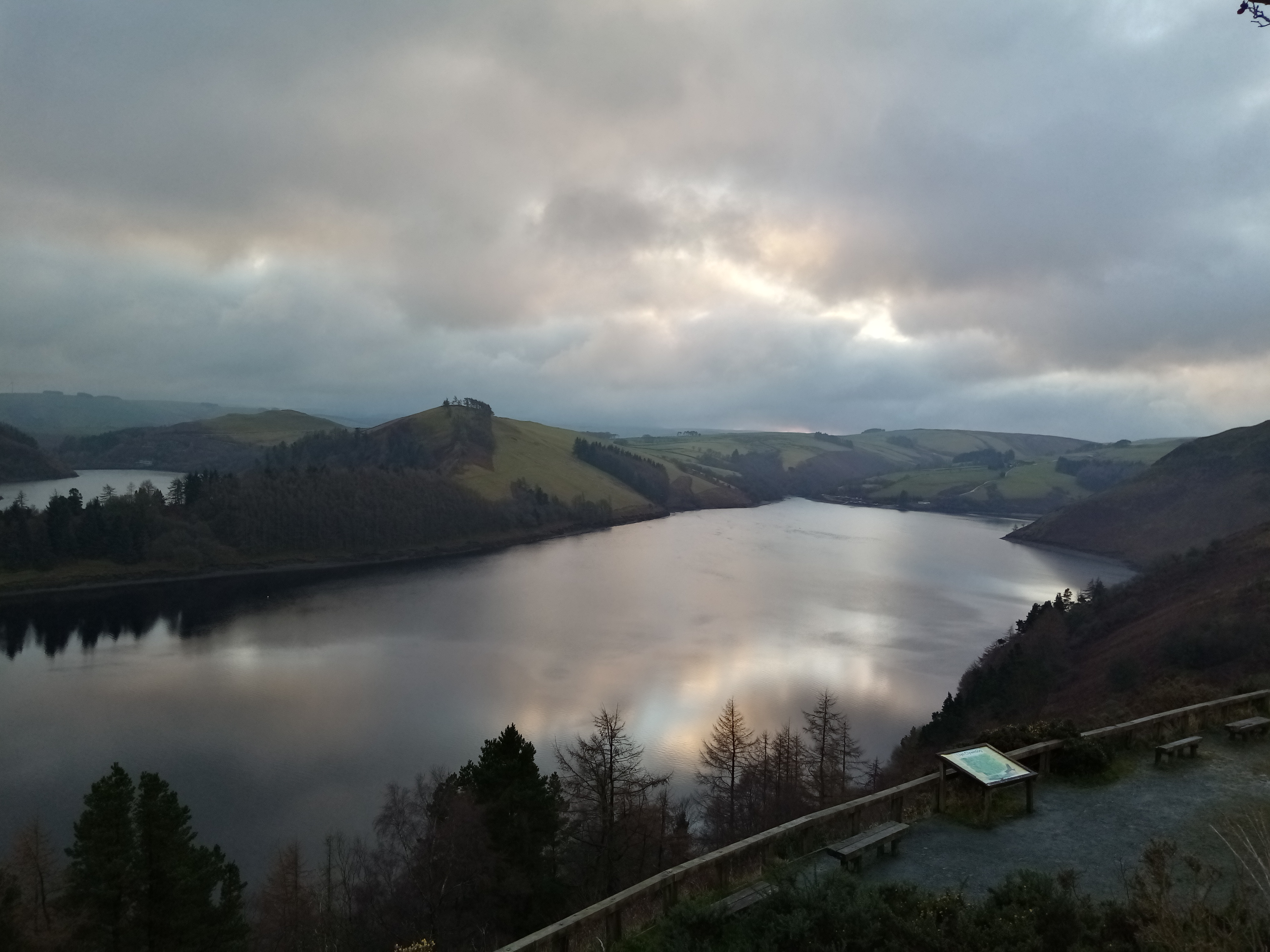
The lake at dusk

It regulates the flow of water in the River Severn by releasing water into the river channel during low flow periods and re-filling during the wetter winter months. This enables major water abstractions to be made from the River Severn to supply the West Midlands with 50 million litres (11,000,000 imp gal) of drinking water. Capacity is held in the reservoir throughout the winter so that it retains capacity to mitigate downstream flooding by absorbing excess flow from the head-waters of the Afon Clywedog, a tributary of the River Severn. The reservoir was formed by damming both the Afon Clywedog and a much smaller embankment dam located at Bwlch-y-gle to prevent overflow into the next valley. Its concrete buttress dam is the tallest concrete dam in the UK, with a height of 72 metres (236 ft) and a length of 230 metres (750 ft). When at capacity the reservoir contains approximately 50,000 megalitres of water.

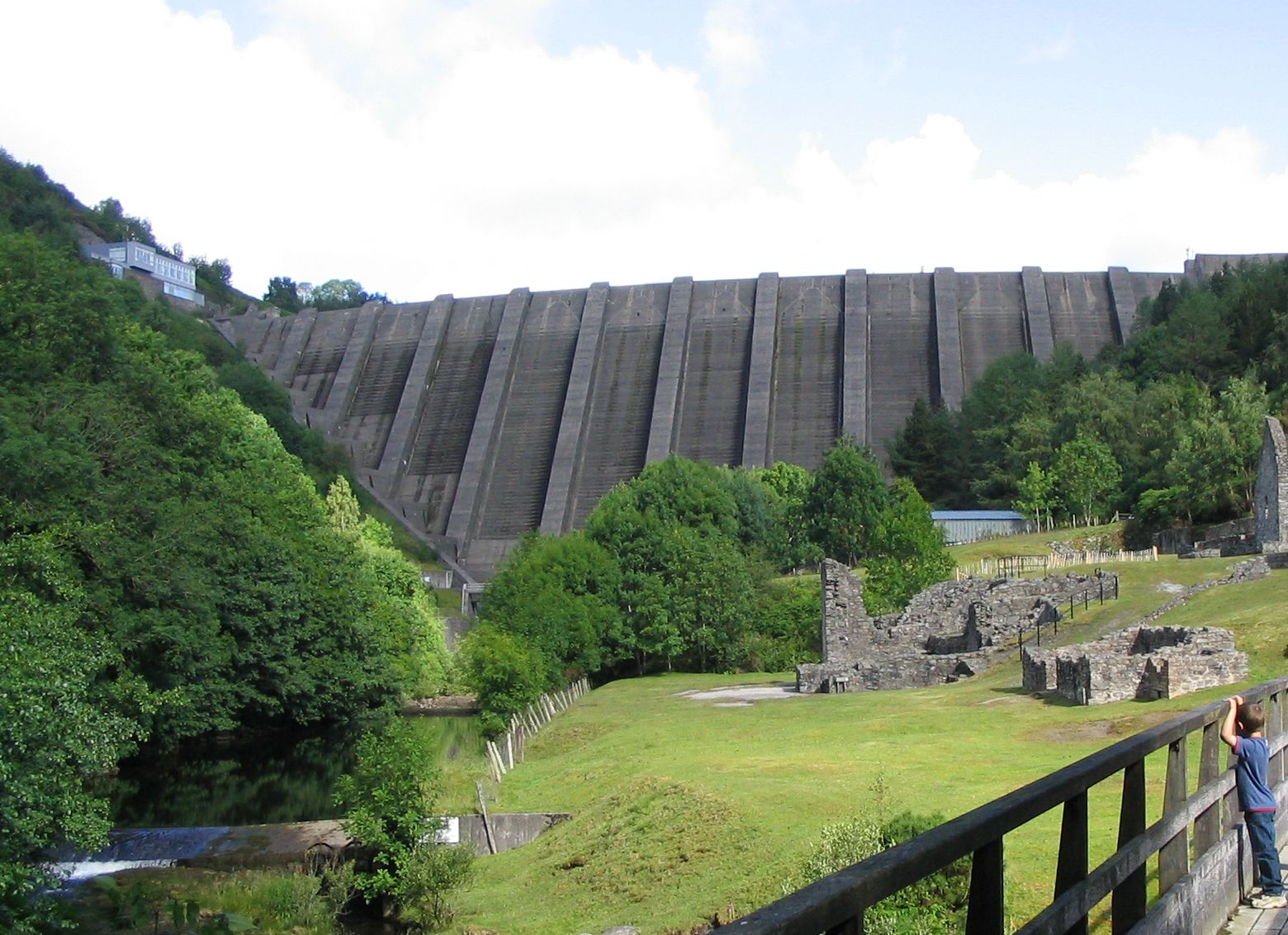
Below Clywedog Reservoir dam

== Construction ==
Clywedog Reservoir Joint Authority Act 1963
- Act of Parliament
- Parliament of the United Kingdom
- Long title: An Act to constitute the Clywedog Reservoir Joint Authority consisting of representatives of the lord mayors, aldermen and citizens of the cities of Birmingham and Coventry, the mayors, aldermen and burgesses of the boroughs of Shrewsbury and Wolverhampton, the mayor, aldermen and citizens of the city of Worcester, the Bristol Waterworks Company, the Central Electricity Generating Board, the Cheltenham and Gloucester Joint Water Board, the East Shropshire Water Board, the East Worcestershire Waterworks Company, the Montgomeryshire Water Board, the South Staffordshire Waterworks Company, the county council of the administrative county of Montgomery and the Severn River Board, to empower the Clywedog Reservoir Joint Authority to acquire lands, to construct works and to regulate the flow of water in the river Severn; to confer powers upon the constituent authorities of the said Authority; and for other purposes.
- Citation: 1963 c. xxxi

Dates
- Royal assent: 31 July 1963

Text of statute as originally enacted

Construction of the dam started in 1963 and finished in 1967 after the passing of an act of Parliament, the Clywedog Reservoir Joint Authority Act 1963 (c. xxxi), ordering its creation to help prevent flooding of the River Severn in winter and to maintain its water levels in the summer. The main contractor for the works was Reed & Mallick and the scheme designer was Sir William Halcrow and Partners. The dam is of an unusual construction in that its curve is downstream, rather than upstream which is more common. The 11 concrete buttresses transfer loads primarily to the valley floor, rather than relying on the valley sides, where there were concerns over the load bearing capacity of the rocks.

Local opposition was strong against the construction of the reservoir as it would result in the flooding of much of the Clywedog valley and the drowning of 615 acres (2.5 km^{2}) of agricultural land. On top of several disruptions and protests, the construction site's overhead cableway was destroyed in a bombing on 6 March 1966, causing £30,000 in damage and delaying construction of the dam by six months. The militant Welsh nationalist organisation Mudiad Amddiffyn Cymru (MAC) was widely suspected of carrying out the bombing.

== Operation ==
The reservoir was opened in 1967 and has been in continuous usage since then, generally filling with water over the winter months and gradually releasing it during the summer months. The reservoir is currently owned and operated by Hafren Dyfrdwy (the successors to the Clywedog Reservoir Joint Authority) with oversight and regulation by Natural Resources Wales. Clywedog Sailing Club operates on the lake, and Powys County Council's Staylittle Outdoor Centre delivers a range of adventure education both on the water and in the surrounding area.The dam operating plant runs self-sufficiently from a 500 kW hydro-electric turbine.

== Recreation ==
The area around Clywedog dam is now a popular leisure destination offering scenic walks and wildlife watching. At the base of the dam lies the ruins of the Bryntail lead mine. In 2005 Natural Resources Wales installed an osprey nest platform near the reservoir. The nest has been in use by breeding ospreys since 2014; by the end of 2022, 22 osprey chicks had been raised on the site. A web camera was installed in 2020 enabling video of the nest to be viewed online. A trout fishery operates on the reservoir.
