= Llanfechain =

Village in northern Powys, Wales

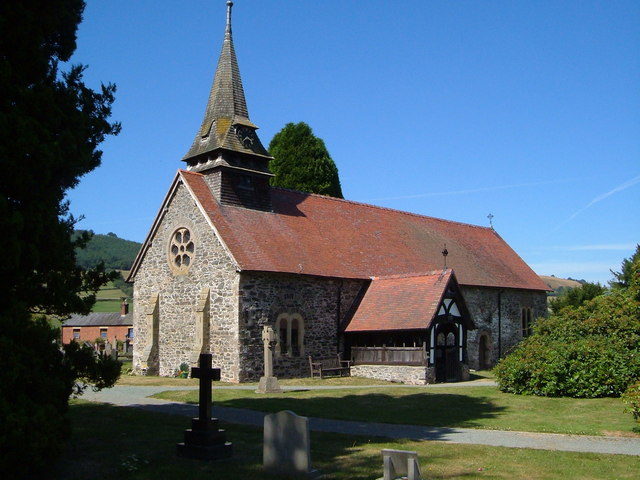
- St Garmon's Church, Llanfechain

- Location within Powys
- Population: 465 (2011)
- OS grid reference: SJ190203
- Community: Llanfechain
- Principal area: Powys
- Preserved county: Powys
- Country: Wales
- Sovereign state: United Kingdom
- Post town: LLANFECHAIN
- Postcode district: SY22
- Dialling code: 01691
- Police: Dyfed-Powys
- Fire: Mid and West Wales
- Ambulance: Welsh
- UK Parliament: Montgomeryshire and Glyndŵr
- Senedd Cymru – Welsh Parliament: Montgomeryshire
- List of places UK Wales Powys 52.7744°N 3.2019°W Community map: Map of the community

Llanfechain is a village and community in Powys, Wales, on the B4393 road between Llanfyllin and Llansantffraid-ym-Mechain. Historically a part of Montgomeryshire. The River Cain runs through. The population of 465 at the 2011 Census was estimated at 476 in 2019.

The Battle of Mechain may have been fought near Llanfechain in 1070.

== Name ==
Llanfechain could mean "parish or church (llan) of the Cain valley" (from Llan ym Mach Cain meaning "church in the field or plain of the Cain" to Llan ym Mechain and then Llan-mechain, which becomes Llanfechain as a result of the common mutation of 'm' to 'f' in Welsh). However, it might also mean "small (fechan) church or parish (llan)". Spellings of place names vary over time, so that small variations such as chain/cain and fechain/fechan are plausible. The name in the form Llanveccheyn is first encountered in 1254. It has also been known as Llanarmon-ym-Mechain, ym-Mechain referring to its location in the medieval cantref of Mechain, thus "Church of St Garmon in Mechain".

== Places of worship ==
The parish church, St Garmon's, was begun in Norman times and retains many original features. It is a Grade II* listed building. Consisting of a single chamber, it has Romanesque windows in the east wall and two doorways in the south wall. There were some Victorian alterations, including the addition of a western bell turret. Inside, the roof dates from the 15th century, the font dates from about 1500, the pulpit bears a date of 1636, and at the western end its gallery remains.

Little is known of St Garmon. Tradition has him living in the 9th century and preaching from a mound in Llanfechain churchyard. The remains of the mound, Twmpath Garmon, are still evident north of the church, although graves have been dug into it. According to the recollections of 19th-century villagers recorded in Volume 5 of the Montgomeryshire Collections, cockpits were dug near to the mound for cockfighting. Fynnon Garmon, the holy well associated with Garmon, lies to the south-east of the village. St Garmon is likely to have been derived from St Germanus (410–474), the first Bishop of Man.

The village once had two chapels: the Peniel Wesleyan Methodist Chapel (erected 1834, rebuilt 1875, Sunday School added 1901, closed about 1990, now residential), and Zoar Calvinistic Methodist Chapel (erected 1827, rebuilt 1914, closed 2008).

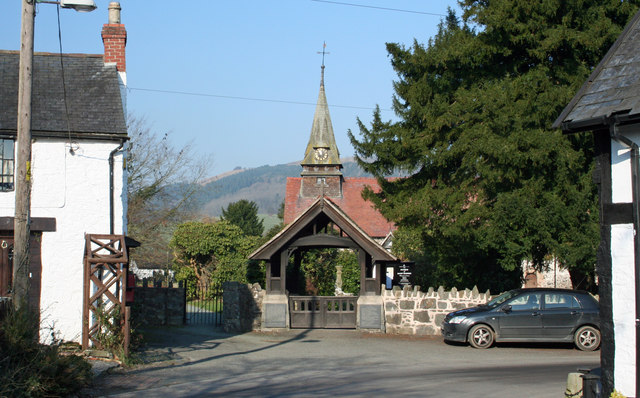
View of St Garmon's Church

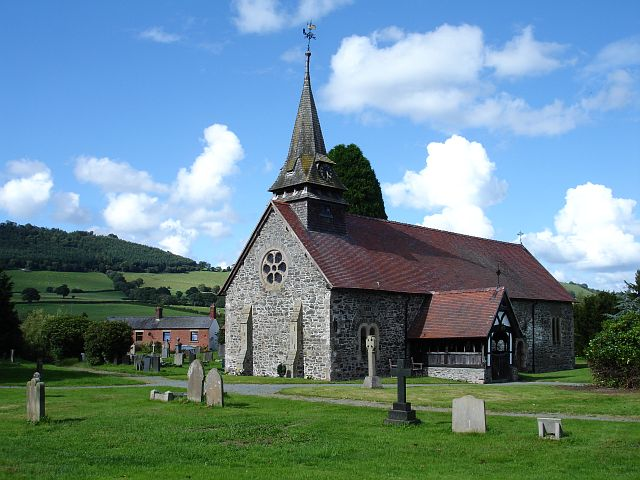
St Garmon's Church and the roughly circular churchyard

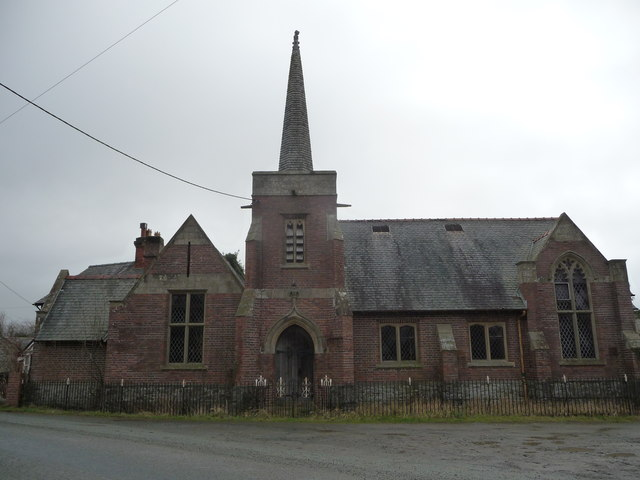
Zoar Calvinistic Methodist Chapel (Capel Zoar)

== Notable sites and buildings ==
- After the Norman Conquest, an earthwork motte-and-bailey castle, Tomen y Castell, was placed above the valley of the Cain to control the area. It was probably a timber castle, of which only the earthworks remain. Its ditched mound measures 38–43 metres in diameter and about 9.5 metres high, having a summit diameter of 10–12 metres. It was probably built by Owain Fychan ap Madog (prince of Powys, son of Madog ap Maredudd) in 1166 – north of the main road from Llanfyllin to Oswestry and about 400 yards south-west of the church.
- Ty Coch, on the main road opposite the lane leading to the church and village, is a restored 15th-century hall-house with 17th-century alterations. It is Grade II listed. It was owned by the Jesuits of Stonyhurst (Lancashire) in the 19th century and used as a resting place for travellers. St Garmon's well (Ffynnon Armon) is on the land of Ty Coch, about 300 yards south-east of the church.
- The local pub, the Plas-yn-Dinas Inn opposite the church, is a Grade II, late 17th-century half-timbered building once used as a courthouse.
- Plas Cain, beside Llanfechain Bridge, is a timber-framed dwelling thought to date from the 17th century. In the late 19th century the house was known as Sycamore Cottage.
- On the north side of the Cain is the Old Rectory, which is believed to date from about 1620; it was much altered and enlarged in the 18th and 19th centuries and ceased to be a parsonage in about 1980.
- Bodynfoel Hall (built in 1832 and home of the Bonnor-Maurice family, some of whom served as High Sheriff of Montgomeryshire) is near Llanfechain. It is a medium-sized early Victorian mansion in neo-Jacobean style, with formal gardens, semi-natural woodland, man-made lake and a small area of park; the mansion is a Grade II listed building. Its grounds are listed Grade II on the Cadw/ICOMOS Register of Parks and Gardens of Special Historic Interest in Wales.
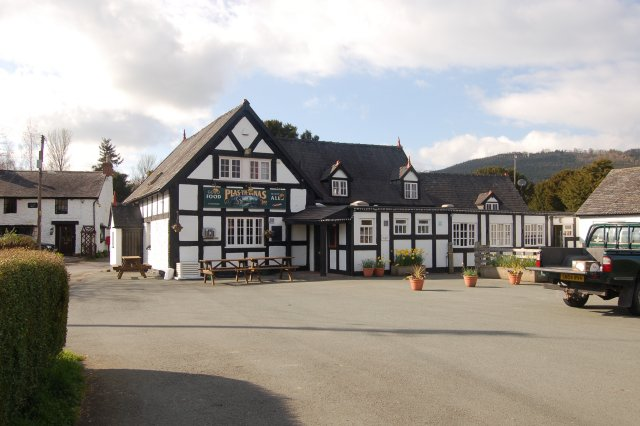
Plas-yn-Dinas Inn

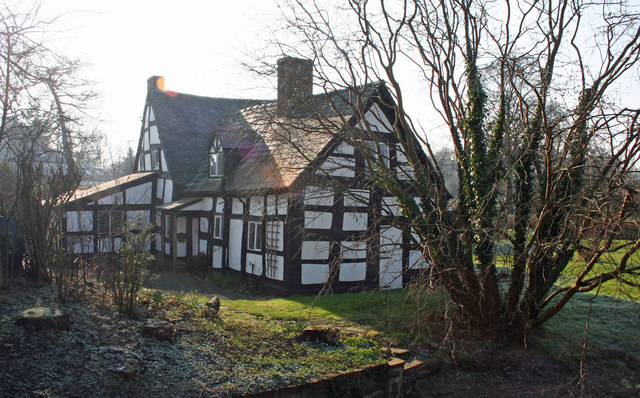
Plas Cain or Sycamore Cottage

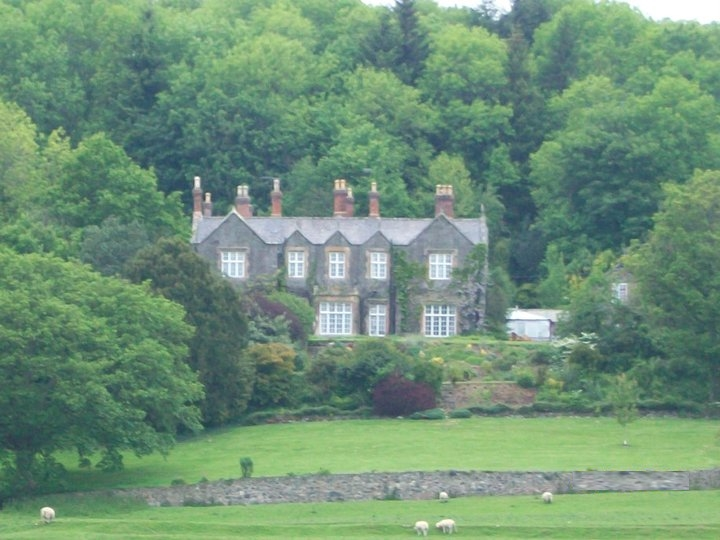
Bodynfoel Hall, Llanfechain

== Notable residents ==
In order of birth date:

- Gwerful Mechain (c. 1460 – post-1502), the one female poet of Medieval Wales from whom much work has survived, was descended from a noble Llanfechain family.
- Walter Davies (1761–1849), bardic name Gwallter Mechain, ("Walter of Mechain"), a Welsh poet, editor, translator, antiquary and Anglican clergyman.
- David Thomas (1833–1916), clergyman, historian and Archdeacon of Montgomery
- David Thomas (1880–1967) was a trade union and Labour Party organizer and adult tutor born and schooled in Llanfechain.
- James Hanley (1897–1985), novelist and playwright, lived in Llanfechain from December 1940 to 1963 and called it by the name "Llangyllwch" for a fictional portrait in the novella "Anatomy of Llangyllwch", part of Don Quixote Drowned (1953). He died in London in 1985 and was buried in Llanfechain.
- Alexander Patrick Greysteil Hore-Ruthven, 2nd Earl of Gowrie, PC, FRSL (1939 – 2021), usually known as Grey Gowrie or Lord Gowrie, lived in the area from 1983 until his death in 2021.

== Railway ==
Llanfechain was served by a station on the Llanfyllin branch of the Cambrian Railways from 1865. The line closed in 1965 and has since been dismantled. The station building remains as a private residence. The track bed to Llanfyllin has been built over by an industrial estate.

== Education and amenities ==
The village has a small Church in Wales primary school and there is a village hall.

A traditional village show had been held on the August Bank Holiday weekend every year since 1966, but had to be cancelled in 2020 due to the COVID-19 pandemic.
