= Pennant, Powys =

Coordinates: 52.5642°N 3.6517°W

Pennant
- Location within Powys
- Principal area: Powys
- Preserved county: Powys
- Country: Wales
- Sovereign state: United Kingdom
- Police: Dyfed-Powys
- Fire: Mid and West Wales
- Ambulance: Welsh
- UK Parliament: Montgomeryshire and Glyndŵr
- Senedd Cymru – Welsh Parliament: Montgomeryshire

Pennant is a small village in Powys, mid Wales located on the B4518 road between Llanbrynmair and Llanidloes. Until 1987 it was a community. It is now in the community of Llanbrynmair.
