= Llanbrynmair =

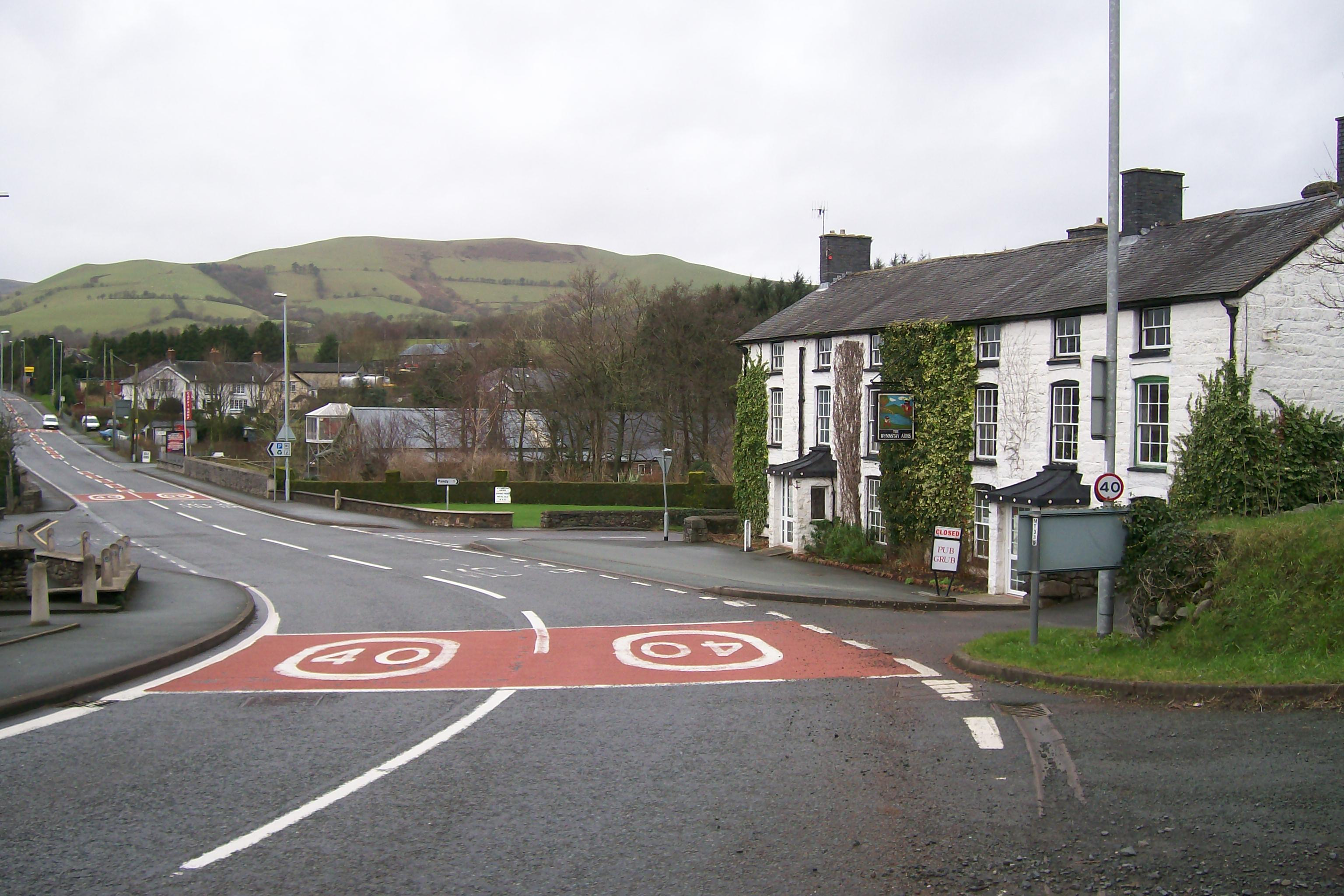

- Location within Powys
- Population: 920 (2011)
- OS grid reference: SH891027
- Principal area: Powys
- Preserved county: Powys
- Country: Wales
- Sovereign state: United Kingdom
- Post town: LLANBRYNMAIR
- Postcode district: SY19
- Dialling code: 01650
- Police: Dyfed-Powys
- Fire: Mid and West Wales
- Ambulance: Welsh
- UK Parliament: Montgomeryshire and Glyndŵr
- Senedd Cymru – Welsh Parliament: Montgomeryshire
- List of places UK Wales Powys 52.612072°N 3.62745°W Community map: Map of the community

Llanbrynmair or Llanbryn-mair (Welsh pronunciation) is a village, community and electoral ward in Powys, Wales. It is on the A470 road between Caersws and Machynlleth, and had a population of 920 in 2011.

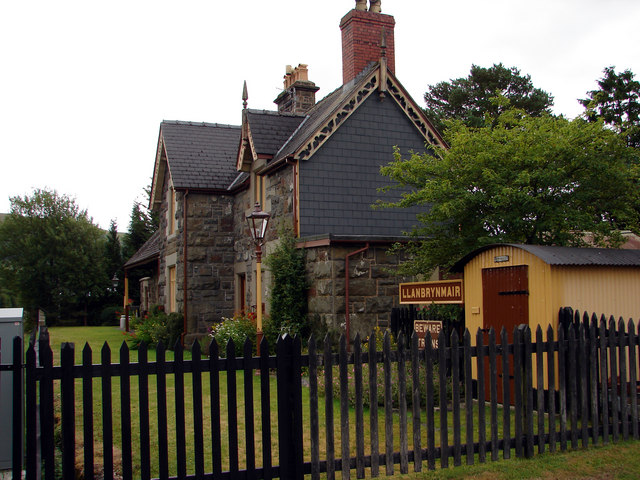
The former railway station; now a private house

== Description ==
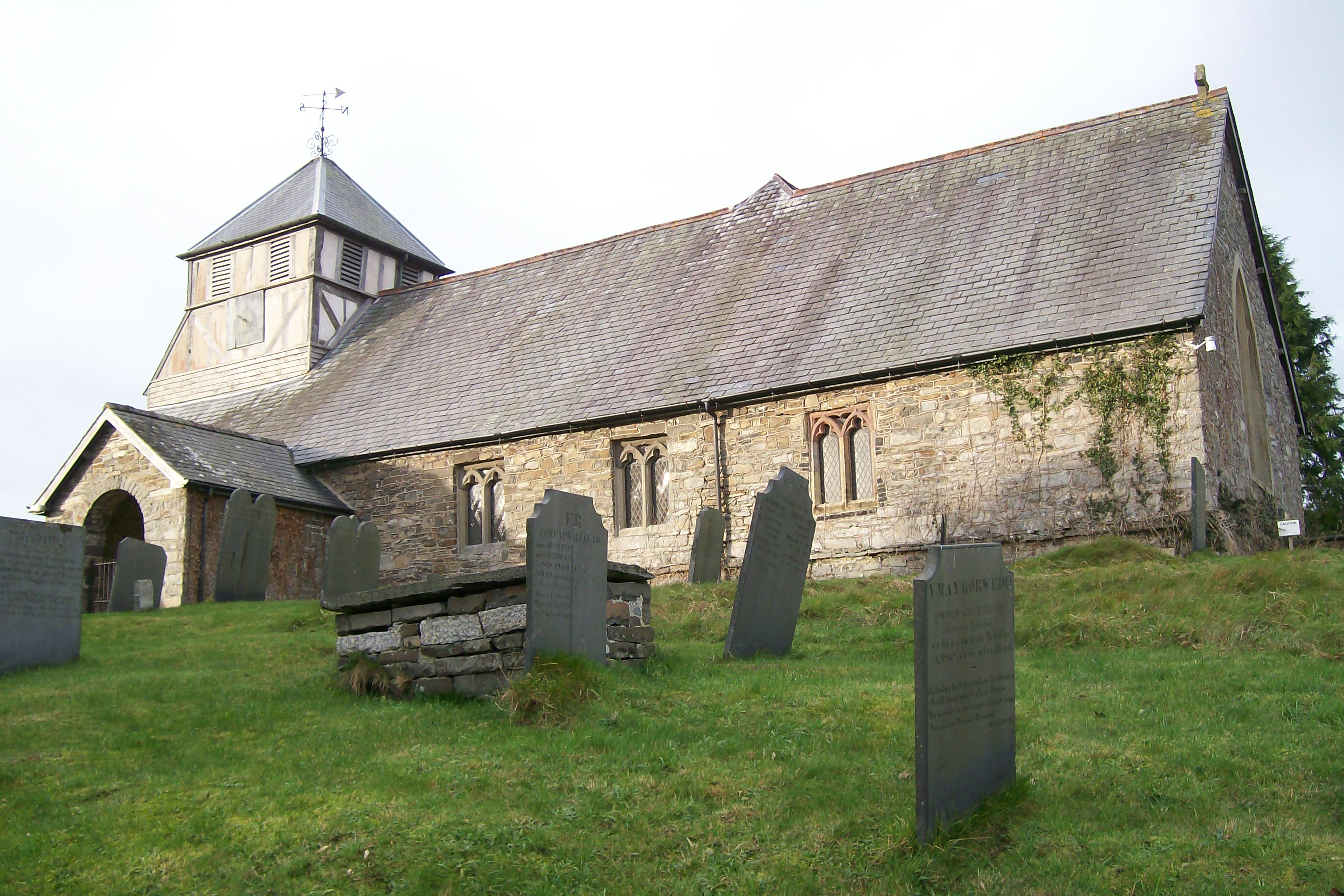
St Mary's parish church, at nearby Llan

The community includes several hamlets: Talerddig, Dolfach, Bont-Dolgadfan, Pandy, Cringoed, Dylife and Pennant. The original centre is at Llan, on the road to Llanidloes, where the local parish church of St Mary is located. The current centre (formerly called "Wynnstay") at the junction of the A470 and B4518 rose to local prominence with the building of the new turnpike road in 1821 and the arrival of the railway line between Newtown and Machynlleth in 1861.

Geographically, the community includes the valleys of three rivers – Afon Twymyn, Afon Iaen and Afon Rhiw Saeson – and the surrounding uplands. The three rivers join around the main village and flow westwards as the Afon Twymyn towards the Afon Dyfi and Cardigan Bay.

The Cambrian railway line, built in the 1860s, runs through Llanbrynmair and for a time provided an outlet for the mines at Dylife, 8 miles (13 km) south. The village station closed in 1965 as part of the "Beeching cuts". There was a level crossing next to the station but, following the accidental death of an American visitor in October 1999 and its description as a "blackspot", the crossing was closed and the road diverted. On 21 October 2024 two trains collided at Talerddig, near the site of the former station, resulting in one fatality and 15 injuries.

The area is predominantly Welsh-speaking and reliant upon livestock farming. It was fortunate to escape the foot and mouth disease outbreak in Britain in 2001.

== History ==
The village was historically in Montgomeryshire.

Much of the area was part of the large Wynnstay Estate owned for generations by the families of Sir Watcyn Williams Wynne. The connection is noted in the "Wynnstay Arms", a prominent local public house.

The parish of Llanbrynmair played prominent roles in both the "Nonconformist Revolution" of the late 18th century and the emigration to America during the 19th and early 20th centuries. This cultural revolution was the movement of Welsh religious independents to break from the established Church of England. The parish is reputed to have been the source of the most emigrants, per capita, to America of any in Wales. The first of them departed Llanbrynmair in 1796. A large proportion of these emigrants settled in western Ohio, particularly in the rural farming communities of Paddy's Run (now Shandon), Gomer and Venedocia. The two most prominent emigrants were Edward Bebb and Ezekiel Hughes, who settled in Butler County, Ohio near Paddy's Run. Edward Bebb's son, William, became governor of the State of Ohio. Josiah Jones, hymnologist under the pen name Josiah Brynmair, emigrated to and is buried in Gomer, Ohio.

In October 2024 the village became the first area in the UK where every resident had access to full fibre broadband.

== Governance ==
Llanbrynmair has a community council representing the interests of the community. Ten councillors are on the council, with six representing the Wynnstay community ward and four from the Bontdolgadfan ward. The council is currently chaired by Richard Ashton.

Llanbrynmair also forms a ward for Powys County Council and elects one county councillor. The ward is currently represented by Plaid Cymru councillor Gary Mitchell.

== Education ==
Ysgol Llanbrynmair provides Welsh-medium primary education to the village and the surrounding area. As of 2025, there were 35 pupils enrolled at the school. In 2025, 78.1 per cent of pupils came from Welsh-speaking homes.

In terms of secondary education, the village is in the catchment area of Ysgol Bro Hyddgen.

== Notable people and former residents ==
- John Breese (1789–1842) Independent minister
- Aled Wyn Davies (born 1974), a classical tenor singer
- Richard Davies (Mynyddog) (1833–1877), poet
- Julines Herring (1582–1644/5), a Puritan clergyman, a staunch proponent of Presbyterianism
- Richard P. Howell (1831–1899), American politician, carpenter, and businessman
- Iorwerth Peate (1901–1982), founder of St Fagans National Museum of History
- Abraham Rees (1743–1825), compiler of Rees's Cyclopædia
- Samuel Roberts (1800–1885), political and economic writer
- Eirug Wyn (1950–2004), satirical novelist
