= List of churches in Powys =

This is a list of churches in Powys, Wales.

== Active churches ==
Name	Community (settlement)	Dedication	Web	Founded	Denomination	Benefice	Notes
St Gwynog, Aberhafesp	Aberhafesp	Gwynog		Medieval	Church in Wales	Cedewain Mission Area	
Rhydfelin Baptist Church	Aberhafesp				Baptist Union		
Bethel Congregational Church, Aberhafesp	Aberhafesp			1871	Cong Federation		
St Tydecho, Garthbeibio	Banwy (Garthbeibio)	Tydecho			Church in Wales	Caereinion Mission Area	
St Cadfan, Llangadfan	Banwy (Llangadfan)	Cadfan			Church in Wales	Caereinion Mission Area	
St Michael, Criggion	Bausley with Criggion (Criggion)	Michael			Church in Wales	Llandysilio, Penrhos, Llandrinio	
St Beuno, Berriew	Berriew	Beuno		Medieval	Church in Wales	Berriew	
St John's Mission Church, Garthmyl	Berriew (Garthmyl)	John ?			Church in Wales	Berriew	
Pantyffridd Mission Church	Berriew (Pant-y-ffridd)				Church in Wales	Berriew	
Pentre Llifior Methodist Church	Berriew (Pentre Llifior)				Methodist	Welshpool & Bro Hafren Circuit	
St Beuno, Bettws Cedewain	Bettws	Beuno		Medieval	Church in Wales	Cedewain Mission Area	
St Gwynog, Llanwnog	Caersws	Gwynog			Church in Wales	Bro Arwystli	
Caersws Baptist Church	Caersws				Baptist Union		
Caersws Methodist Church	Caersws				Methodist	Welshpool & Bro Hafren Circuit	
St John the Baptist, Carno	Carno	John the Baptist			Church in Wales	Bro Arwystli	
St Garmon, Castle Caereinion	Castle Caereinion	Germanus of Auxerre			Church in Wales	Welshpool & Castle Caereinion	
Capel Maesygroes, Castle Caereinion	Castle Caereinion				Methodist	Cymru	
St Nicholas, Church Stoke	Churchstoke	Nicholas			Church of England	Onny Camlad	Dedicated to St Mary until 1881
St Etheldreda, Hyssington	Churchstoke (Hyssington)	Æthelthryth			Church of England	Onny Camlad	
Hyssington Methodist Church	Churchstoke (Hyssington)				Methodist	Shropshire & Marches Circuit	
St Mary the Virgin, Snead	Churchstoke (Snead)	Mary			Church of England	Onny Camlad	
St Mary, Llanllugan	Dwyriw (Llanllugan)	Mary		Medieval	Church in Wales	Caereinion Mission Area	Previously Llanllugan Abbey
St Gwyddelan, Llanwyddelan	Dwyriw (Llanwyddelan)	Gwyddelan			Church in Wales	Cedewain Mission Area	
St Michael & All Angels, Forden	Forden, Leighton, Trelystan (Forden)	Michael & Angels			Church in Wales	Montgomery, Forden, Llandyssil	
Holy Trinity, Leighton	Forden, Leighton, Trelystan (Leighton)	Trinity			Church of England	Chirbury, Marton etc	
St Mary the Virgin, Trelystan	Forden, Leighton, Trelystan (Trelystan)	Mary			Church of England	Chirbury, Marton etc	
St Tydecho, Cemmaes	Glantwymyn (Cemmaes)	Tydecho			Church in Wales	Bro Cyfeiliog a Mawddwy	
St Tudur, Darowen	Glantwymyn (Darowen)	Tudur			Church in Wales	Bro Cyfeiliog a Mawddwy	
SS Ust & Dyfrig, Llanwrin	Glantwymyn (Llanwrin)	Ust & Dubricius			Church in Wales	Bro Cyfeiliog a Mawddwy	
St Aelhaiarn, Guilsfield	Guilsfield	Aelhaiarn			Church in Wales	Guilsfield, Buttington, Pool Quay	
St Michael & All Angels, Kerry	Kerry	Michael & Angels			Church in Wales	Cedewain Mission Area	Mostly rebuilt 1882-1883
Kerry Baptist Church	Kerry				Baptist Union		
St Paul, Dolfor	Kerry (Dolfor)	Paul			Church in Wales	Cedewain Mission Area	
Holy Trinity, Sarn	Kerry (Sarn)	Trinity		1860	Church of England	Ridgeway Churches	
Sarn Baptist Church	Kerry (Sarn)			1826	Baptist Union GB		On both BUGB and BUW websites
St Mary, Llanbrynmair	Llanbrynmair	Mary			Church in Wales	Bro Cyfeiliog a Mawddwy	
St Llonio, Llandinam	Llandinam	Llonio			Church in Wales	Bro Arwystli	
Newchapel Baptist Church	Llandinam				Baptist Union		Exact location unclear
Beulah Baptist Church, Llidiartywaun	Llandinam (Llidiartywaun)	Beulah			Baptist Union		
SS Trinio, Peter & Paul, Llandrinio	Llandrinio	Trinio, Peter & Paul			Church in Wales	Llandysilio, Penrhos, Llandrinio	
Holy Trinity, Penrhos	Llandrinio (Penrhos)	Trinity		pre-1627	Church in Wales	Llandysilio, Penrhos, Llandrinio	Rebuilt 1627, 1845
Sarnau United Reformed Church	Llandrinio (Sarn-wen)				URC		
St Tysilio, Llandysilio	Llandysilio	Tysilio			Church in Wales	Llandysilio, Penrhos, Llandrinio	
St Tysul, Llandyssil	Llandyssil	Tysul		Medieval	Church in Wales	Montgomery, Forden, Llandyssil	New building 1863-1866
St Llwchaiarn, Llanmerewig	Llandyssil (Llanmerewig)	Llwchaiarn			Church in Wales	Cedewain Mission Area	
St Erfyl, Llanerfyl	Llanerfyl	Erfyl			Church in Wales	Caereinion Mission Area	
Llanerfyl Methodist Church	Llanerfyl				Methodist	Cymru	
St Mary, Llanfair Caereinion	Llanfair Caereinion	Mary			Church in Wales	Caereinion Mission Area	
Capel Gwynfa, Llanfair Caereinion	Llanfair Caereinion				Methodist	Cymru	
Bethesda Methodist Church, Llanf. Caerein.	Llanfair Caereinion	Pool of Bethesda			Methodist		
St Garmon, Llanfechain	Llanfechain	Germanus of Auxerre		Medieval	Church in Wales	Vyrnwy Mission Area	
St Michael, Llanfihangel-yng-Ngwynfa	Llanfihangel	Michael			Church in Wales	Vyrnwy Mission Area	
St John the Evangelist, Dolanog	Llanfihangel (Dolanog)	John the Evangelist			Church in Wales	Caereinion Mission Area	
St Mary, Llwydiarth	Llanfihangel (Llwydiarth)	Mary			Church in Wales	Vyrnwy Mission Area	
St Myllin, Llanfyllin	Llanfyllin	Myllin			Church in Wales	Vyrnwy Mission Area	
Llanfyllin Methodist Church	Llanfyllin				Methodist	Cymru	
Capel Soar, Llanfyllin	Llanfyllin	Zoara			Methodist	Cymru	
St Cedwyn, Llangedwyn	Llangedwyn	Cedwyn			Church in Wales	Tanat Valley Mission Area	
Capel y Briw, Llangedwyn	Llangedwyn				Methodist	Cymru	
St Curig, Llangurig	Llangurig	Curig			Church in Wales	Bro Arwystli	
Cwmbelan Baptist Church	Llangurig (Cwmbelan)				Baptist Union		
St Cynyw, Llangynyw	Llangyniew	Cynyw			Church in Wales	Caereinion Mission Area	
St John the Evangelist, Pontrobert	Llangyniew (Pontrobert)	John the Evangelist		1853	Church in Wales	Caereinion Mission Area	
St Cynog, Llangynog	Llangynog	Cynog s. Brychan			Church in Wales	Tanat Valley Mission Area	
Llangynog Methodist Church	Llangynog				Methodist	Cymru	
St Melangell, Pennant Melangell	Llangynog (Pennant Melangell)	Melangell		Medieval	Church in Wales	Tanat Valley Mission Area	
St Idloes, Llanidloes	Llanidloes	Idloes		Medieval	Church in Wales	Bro Arwystli	
Our Lady & St Richard Gwyn, Llanidloes	Llanidloes	Mary & Richard Gwyn			Roman Catholic	Welshpool	
Beulah Baptist Church, Llanidloes	Llanidloes	Beulah			Baptist Union		
Llanidloes Methodist Church	Llanidloes				Methodist	Welshpool & Bro Hafren Circuit	
Trinity United Reformed Church, Llanidloes	Llanidloes	Trinity		1878	URC		Formerly Sion Independent
St Dogfan, Llanrhaeadr-ym-Mochnant	Llanrhaeadr-ym-Mochnant	Dogfan			Church in Wales	Tanat Valley Mission Area	
Llanrhaeadr-ym-Mochnant Methodist Church	Llanrhaeadr-ym-Mochnant				Methodist	Cymru	
Capel Moreia, Cymdu	Llanrhaeadr-ym-Mochnant (Cymdu)	Moriah			Methodist	Cymru	
St Mary, Brithdir	Llanrhaeadr-ym-Mochnant (Rhos-y-brithdir)	Mary			Church in Wales	Tanat Valley Mission Area	
St Ffraid, Llansantffraid-ym-Mechan	Llansantffraid	Brigid of Kildare			Church in Wales	Vyrnwy Mission Area	
Llansantffraid Methodist Church (English)	Llansantffraid				Methodist	Shropshire & Marches Circuit	
Llansantffraid Methodist Church (Welsh)	Llansantffraid				Methodist	Cymru	
St Silin, Llansilin	Llansilin	Silin		Medieval	Church in Wales	Tanat Valley Mission Area	Only border church voting to join Church in Wales
Llansilin Methodist Church	Llansilin				Methodist	Cymru	Two buildings, Cefn-y-braich and Soar
St Cadwaladr, Llangadwaladr	Llansilin (Llangadwaladr)	Cadwaladr			Church in Wales	Tanat Valley Mission Area	
Rhiwlas Mission Church	Llansilin (Rhiwlas)				Church in Wales	Tanat Valley Mission Area	
Christ Church, Rhydycroesau	Llansilin (Rhydycroesau)	Jesus		1838	Church of England		
St Wyddyn, Llanwddyn	Llanwddyn	Wyddyn			Church in Wales	Vyrnwy Mission Area	
St Peter, Machynlleth	Machynlleth	Peter		Medieval	Church in Wales	Bro Cyfeiliog a Mawddwy	Rebuilt 1827
Our Lady Help of Christians, Machynlleth	Machynlleth	Mary			Roman Catholic	Tywyn & Machynlleth	
Capel Bethesda, Machynlleth	Machynlleth	Bethesda			Baptist Union		
Machynlleth Community Church	Machynlleth				Independent		
St Michael, Manafon	Manafon	Michael		Medieval	Church in Wales	Caereinion Mission Area	
SS Tysilio & Mary, Meifod	Meifod	Tysilio & Mary			Church in Wales	Caereinion Mission Area	
Christ Church, Bwlchycibau	Meifod (Bwlchycibau)	Jesus			Church in Wales	Vyrnwy Mission Area	
All Saints, Mochdre	Mochdre	All Saints			Church in Wales	Cedewain Mission Area	
Pentre Baptist Church	Mochdre				Baptist Union		
St Gwrhai, Penstrowed	Mochdre (Penstrowed)	Gwrhai			Church in Wales	Bro Arwystli	Rebuilt 1864
St Nicholas, Montgomery	Montgomery	Nicholas		Medieval	Church in Wales	Montgomery, Forden, Llandyssil	
St Llwchaiarn, Llanllwchaiarn	Newtown & Llanllwchaiarn (Llanllwchaiarn)	Llwchaiarn		Medieval	Church in Wales	Cedewain Mission Area	Rebuilt 1815-1816
All Saints, Newtown	Newtown & Llanllwchaiarn (Newtown)	All Saints		1890	Church in Wales	Cedewain Mission Area	
God the Holy Spirit, Newtown	Newtown & Llanllwchaiarn (Newtown)	Holy Spirit		1942	Roman Catholic	Welshpool	Building 1947
Zion Baptist Church, Newtown	Newtown & Llanllwchaiarn (Newtown)				Baptist Union GB		On BUGB and BUW websites (unless really two)
Newtown Methodist Church	Newtown & Llanllwchaiarn (Newtown)				Methodist	Welshpool & Bro Hafren Circuit	
Newtown United Reformed Church	Newtown & Llanllwchaiarn (Newtown)				URC		
Newtown Salvation Army	Newtown & Llanllwchaiarn (Newtown)				Salvation Army		
Newtown Evangelical Church	Newtown & Llanllwchaiarn (Newtown)			1979	AECW		
Hope Church Newtown	Newtown & Llanllwchaiarn (Newtown)			1948	Assemblies of God		Building 1977
Newtown Seventh-Day Adventist Church	Newtown & Llanllwchaiarn (Newtown)				7th-Day Adventist		
St Thomas, Penybontfawr	Pen-y-bont-fawr	Thomas			Church in Wales	Tanat Valley Mission Area	
St Andrew's Church, Presteigne	Presteigne	St. Andrew			Church of England		
St Michael, Trefeglwys	Trefeglwys	Michael			Church in Wales	Bro Arwystli	
Trefeglwys Methodist Church	Trefeglwys				Methodist	Welshpool & Bro Hafren Circuit	
Llawryglyn Methodist Church	Trefeglwys (Llawryglyn)				Methodist	Welshpool & Bro Hafren Circuit	
St Cynon, Tregynon	Tregynon	Cynon			Church in Wales	Cedewain Mission Area	
All Saints, Buttington	Trewern (Buttington)	All Saints			Church in Wales	Guilsfield, Buttington, Pool Quay	
Cefn Methodist Church, Buttington	Trewern (Buttington)				Methodist	Welshpool & Bro Hafren Circuit	
All Saints, Middletown	Trewern (Middleton)	All Saints			Church of England	Ford, Great Wollaston etc	
St Mary, Welshpool	Welshpool	Mary		Medieval	Church in Wales	Welshpool & Castle Caereinion	
St Winefride, Welshpool	Welshpool	Winifred			Roman Catholic	Welshpool	
Welshpool Baptist Church	Welshpool				Baptist Union GB		On both BUGB and BUW websites
Welshpool Methodist Church	Welshpool				Methodist	Welshpool & Bro Hafren Circuit	
New Street United Church	Welshpool				URC		
Welshpool Community Church	Welshpool				FIEC		
New Street Evangelical Church, Welshpool	Welshpool			1991	AECW		
St John the Evangelist, Pool Quay	Welshpool (Pool Quay)	John the Evangelist			Church in Wales	Guilsfield, Buttington, Pool Quay	

== Defunct churches ==
Name	Community (settlement)	Dedication	Web	Founded	Redundant	Denomination	Notes
St Mary, Newtown	Newtown & Llanllwchaiarn (Newtown)	Mary		Medieval	1856	Church in Wales	Weakened by flooding from the Severn
St David, Newtown	Newtown & Llanllwchaiarn (Newtown)	David of Wales		1843-1847	2006	Church in Wales	
Christ Church, Welshpool	Welshpool	Jesus		1839-1844	1998	Church in Wales	Sold 2002 and now a house
