= Long Mountain (Powys) =

Hill in Powys, Wales and Shropshire, England

Coordinates: 52°39′N 3°04′W

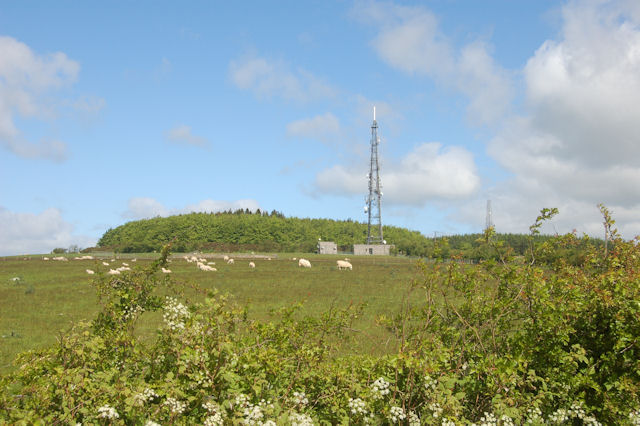
Beacon Ring and transmitting station on the summit of Long Mountain.

Long Mountain (Welsh: Cefn Digoll) is a hill straddling the boundary between Powys (Wales) and Shropshire (England) to the east of Welshpool though the summit at 408 metres (1,339 feet) at Beacon Ring (grid reference SJ265058) is within Wales. Long Mountain is a Marilyn (a hill with topographic prominence of at least 150 metres), having a prominence of 305 metres (1,000 feet).

== Geology ==
Long Mountain is formed from a succession of sedimentary rocks dating from the Silurian period. In stratigraphic order i.e. youngest/uppermost first, these are:

- Raglan Mudstone Formation (siltstone, mudstone)
- Temeside Mudstone Formation (mudstone, siltstone, sandstone)
- Tilestones Formation (sandstone)
- Cefn Einion Formation (mudstone, siltstone, sandstone)
- Knucklas Castle Formation (mudstone, siltstone, sandstone)
- Bailey Hill Formation (siltstone, sandstone) (including the Cwm-yr-hob Member (mudstone, siltstone, sandstone)
- Irfon Formation (mudstone, siltstone)
- Gyfenni Wood Shale Formation (mudstone)
- Trewern Brook Mudstone Formation (mudstone) (including the Mottled Mudstone Member)
- Tarannon Mudstone Formation (mudstone)
- Cefn Formation (mudstone, sandstone)

The first three listed above form a part of the Old Red Sandstone sequence and occur only in the easternmost part of the area. The summit which is towards the southwestern end of Long Mountain is formed by rocks of the Knucklas Castle Formation. Numerous faults cut the succession. There are a number of glaciofluvial deposits around the margins of Long Mountain, dating from the last ice age. Pockets of glacial till of similar age occur in some of the valleys.

== Geography ==
Long Mountain extends from Forden, Powys, in the southwest to Vennington near Westbury in Shropshire to the northeast. It is sometimes considered to include the Breidden Hills to the north although the latter are separated from Long Mountain's main body by a valley through which run a railway line and a major trunk road (the A458) which both connect Welshpool with Shrewsbury.

== History ==
There was possibly a Roman road along Long Mountain, part of a route from Uriconium (Wroxeter) to Lavobrinta (Forden Gaer). At the southern end of the hill and along its western flanks are traces of Offa's Dyke.

There is a hillfort at Beacon Ring, at the southern end of the Long Mountain. This was probably built in the Iron Age and may have been re-used in medieval times. It has been owned by the Clwyd-Powys Archaeological Trust since 2008, who have in recent years conducted archaeological investigations on the site. Beacon Ring is also famous for the 'EIIR' monogram of the tree plantation which covers the site.

In 630 the hill was the scene of the Battle of Cefn Digoll, between Northumbria and an alliance of Gwynedd and Mercia. Towards the eastern end of the Long Mountain are the remains of Caus Castle, which was built in Norman times upon an earlier, Iron Age, hillfort.

In 1485, when Henry Tudor invaded via South Wales and travelled north towards the battlefield at Bosworth, it was at the Long Mountain, near Trelystan, on 13 August that he arranged a rendezvous with his Lancastrian supporters, including Sir Rhys ap Thomas.

== Recreation and access ==
The Offa's Dyke Path leaves Offa's Dyke at Buttington to head for the summit before rejoining the Dyke as it heads away to the south. The Cross Britain Way shares the route of the Offa's Dyke Path between Buttington and the summit then heads east to Brockton on the southeast edge of the hill. Route 81 of the National Cycle Network runs over Long Mountain on its course between Welshpool and Shrewsbury. There are a couple of areas of open access land, Walton Hill and Heldre Hill and a moderately dense network of public rights of way running between the many minor roads which criss-cross the area. Gunley Wood is a publicly accessible woodland owned and managed by Natural Resources Wales at the southernmost edge of Long Mountain.

== See also ==
- List of hillforts in Wales
