= Thomas Nicholson (architect) =

Thomas Nicholson (1823–1895) was a British architect. He is known for designing the Church of St Michael and All Angels in Forden, Powys in Wales. Among his other Welsh churches were St James, Swansea and St Gabriel, Swansea.

== Career ==
Nicholson became the Hereford Diocese Architect and was working in St Peter's Street, Hereford in 1865. He had an extensive practice in the Welsh Marches. In 1855 he extended the church at Stoke Prior started by Thomas Duckham. He was involved together with Stephen W Williams in laying out the new town at Llandrindod Wells. Nicholson laid out the 'Pump House' Estate portion of the development. In 1867-69, he undertook the restoration of the Church of St James, Kinnersley.
