= Dwyriw =

Dwyriw: Welsh: Dwyrhiw
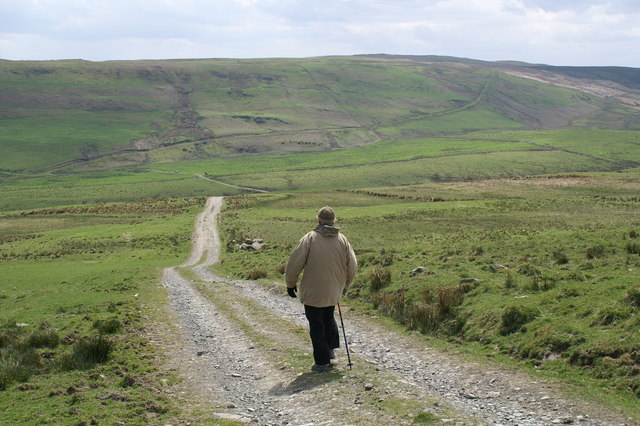
- Mynydd Dwyriw
- Population: 571
  - London: 180 mi (290 km)
- Principal area: Powys
- Preserved county: Powys
- Country: Wales
- Sovereign state: United Kingdom
- Post town: NEWTOWN
- Postcode district: SY16
- Post town: WELSHPOOL
- Postcode district: SY21
- Dialling code: 01938
- Police: Dyfed-Powys
- Fire: Mid and West Wales
- Ambulance: Welsh
- UK Parliament: Montgomeryshire and Glyndŵr
- Senedd Cymru – Welsh Parliament: Montgomeryshire
- Website: Dwyriw Community Council
- List of places UK Wales Powys 52.6133°N 3.369°W Map of the community

Dwyriw is a community in the county of Powys (previously Montgomeryshire), mid Wales. It was created on 1 April 1987.

It is located between two tributaries of the Afon Rhiw, hence the name ("Two Rhiw Rivers"), south-west of Llanfair Caereinion.

Historic buildings nearby include Capel Coffa Lewis Evan in Adfa and St. Mary's Church, Llanllugan.

The villages within the community include Adfa (the largest settlement), Llanllugan, Cefn Coch and Llanwyddelan.

According to the 2011 Census the population of Dwyriw was 571, including 474 adults over 16 years old.

The community elects eight community councillors to Dwyriw Community Council, from the wards of Llanwyddelan and Llanllugan.

The area formerly contained Llanllugan Abbey, although its exact site remains uncertain.
