= List of Macmillan Ways =

The Macmillan Ways are a network of long-distance footpaths in England that link points on the Bristol Channel, English Channel and North Sea. They are promoted to raise money for Macmillan Cancer Relief, a charity. The Macmillan Ways are:

- The Macmillan Way - Abbotsbury in Dorset to Boston, Lincolnshire 464 kilometres (288 mi);
- The Macmillan Way West from Castle Cary in Somerset to Barnstaple in Devon, 163 kilometres (101 mi) (Boston to Barnstaple is 557 kilometres (346 mi));
- The Macmillan Abbotsbury Langport Link, which creates a 38.5 kilometres (23.9 mi) short-cut for walkers from Abbotsbury to Barnstaple, a total of 202 kilometres (126 mi);
- The Macmillan Cross Cotswold Pathway from Banbury to Bath, 138 kilometres (86 mi), mostly on the main Macmillan Way;
- The Cotswold Link, 33.5 kilometres (20.8 mi) from Banbury to Chipping Campden where it links to the Cotswold Way National Trail
- The Cross Britain Way, 446 kilometres (277 mi) from Barmouth to Boston across Wales and England, launched in 2014

== See also ==
- List of long-distance footpaths in the United Kingdom
