= Macmillan Way =

Long-distance footpath in England

- Length: 290 mi (470 km)
- Location: England
- Trailheads: Boston Lincolnshire; 52.9746°N 0.0214°W and Abbotsbury, Dorset; 50.6664°N 2.60063°W
- Use: Hiking
- Elevation change: 161 m (528 ft)
- Difficulty: Easy
- Season: All year
- Sights: Rutland Water, Jurassic Coast

The Macmillan Way is a long-distance footpath in England that links Boston, Lincolnshire to Abbotsbury in Dorset. The route's distance is 290 miles (470 km). It is promoted to raise money for the charity Macmillan Cancer Relief.

The fully waymarked route follows existing footpaths, bridleways and byways, and small stretches of minor roads when these are unavoidable. It runs across open fen country for its first 30 miles (48 km) and for the rest of its journey it then follows the course of the oolitic limestone belt.

The Macmillan Way starts from Boston and then runs across the Fens to their western edge at Kate's Bridge near Bourne before joining the limestone belt. From Boston it heads to Stamford and then along the shore of Rutland Water to Oakham. It then leads south and west via Warmington to Stow-on-the-Wold, then through the Cotswolds via Cirencester and Tetbury to Bradford-on-Avon. Then through Somerset and into Dorset via Castle Cary and Sherborne to Abbotsbury on the coast.

The route links with the Viking Way at Oakham, the Thames Path National Trail near Thames Head and with the South West Coast Path at the finish.

The Macmillan Ways are a network of long-distance footpaths in England. Others are:

- The Macmillan Way West from Castle Cary in Somerset to Barnstaple in Devon, 163 kilometres (101 mi) (Boston to Barnstaple is 557 kilometres (346 mi));
- The Macmillan Abbotsbury Langport Link, which creates a 38.5 kilometres (23.9 mi) short-cut for walkers from Abbotsbury to Barnstaple, a total of 202 kilometres (126 mi);
- The Macmillan Cross Cotswold Pathway from Banbury to Bath, 138 kilometres (86 mi), mostly on the main Macmillan Way;
- The Cotswold Link, 33.5 kilometres (20.8 mi) from Banbury to Chipping Campden where it links to the Cotswold Way National Trail.
