= Adfa, Powys =

Village in Powys, Wales

Coordinates: 52.59937°N 3.38911°W

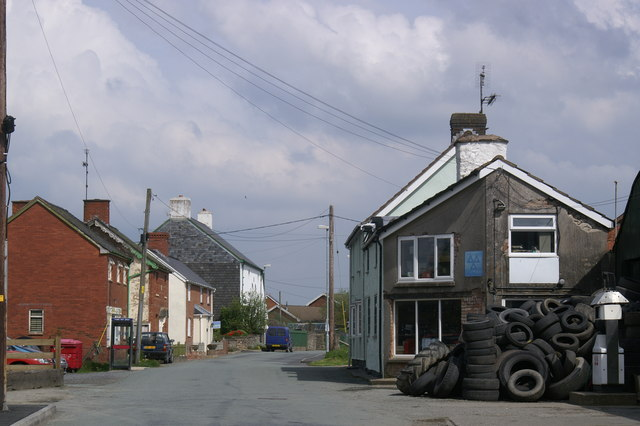
Western approaches

Adfa is a village in the Welsh county of Powys, in mid Wales. It is in the historic county of Montgomeryshire.

Adfa has a Methodist-Calvinist chapel and school. Before Adfa grew into its own, distinct Hamlet, the land that it sits on was tied to the Llanllugan Nunnery. The hamlet became a major focal point in the history of Welsh nonconformity.
