= Church of St Michael and All Angels, Forden =

Coordinates: 52.601541°N 3.142331°W

Church of St Michael and All Angels
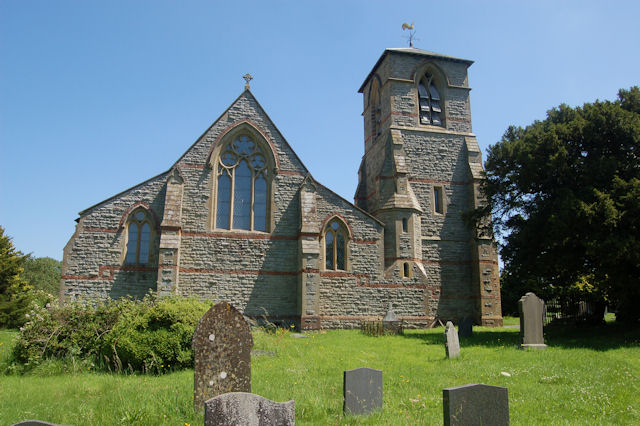
- Church of St Michael and All Angels

- Location within Powys
- Location: Forden, Powys
- Country: Wales
- Denomination: Church in Wales

Architecture
- Functional status: Active
- Architectural type: Church

Specifications
- Materials: Stone

Administration
- Province: Wales
- Diocese: St Asaph

The Church of St Michael and All Angels is a church in Forden, Powys, Wales, located about half a mile to the west of the road from Welshpool to Montgomery. For some three hundred years the church was the burial-place of the family of Devereux, whose estate of Nantcribba is within the parish. The marble font, oval in shape, was presented in 1794 by Richard Edmunds, Esq. It was enlarged in 1830. The architect was Thomas Nicholson and the stained glass was designed by Edward Burne-Jones.

== See also ==
- List of churches in Powys
