= Eiluned Lewis =

Welsh novelist, poet and journalist (1900–1979)

- Born: Janet Eiluned Lewis; 1 November 1900; Penstrowed, Wales
- Died: 15 April 1979 (aged 78)
- Occupations: Writer, journalist, poet, novelist

Janet Eiluned Lewis (1 November 1900 – 15 April 1979) was a Welsh novelist, poet and journalist.

== Early life and education ==
Janet Eiluned Lewis was born in Penstrowed near Newtown, Montgomeryshire, the daughter of Eveline Griffiths and Hugh Lewis. Her father had a tannery business, and her mother was a teacher before marriage, and later a county councillor and justice of the peace.

The Lewis family had a close friendship with writer Sir James Barrie. He visited for holidays at Glanhafren, the Lewis's home on the banks of the Severn. In letters written to Andrew Birkin by Nico Llewelyn Davies (one of the five boys who were J. M. Barrie's inspiration for Peter Pan) it was suggested that Lewis had once been a girlfriend of Nico's brother Michael. Lewis denied this was the case.

== Career ==
=== Journalism ===
Eiluned Lewis was a journalist, first at The Daily News and then, after 1934, at the Sunday Times, where she wrote book reviews and drama criticism, and became assistant editor. In 1936, Lewis traveled to India as personal assistant to Dame Elizabeth Cadbury, a committed Quaker pacifist and leader of the UK Delegation to the World Congress of the International Council of Women, which was held in Calcutta. Lewis was briefly a member of the Peace Pledge Union. Lewis was the longest standing contributor to Country Life magazine, and produced "A Country Woman's Notes", a monthly column, for 35 years.

=== Literature ===
Lewis wrote short stories, articles, lectures, and radio plays. She is perhaps best remembered for her first novel, Dew on the Grass (1934), a bestseller based on her own childhood; it was awarded a gold medal from the Book Guild as Novel of the Year. Her second novel The Captain's Wife (1943) is historical fiction, based on her family's seagoing background in Pembrokeshire.

She compiled and edited the letters of writer Charles Langbridge Morgan, for a collection published in 1967. She wrote a travel book, The Land of Wales (1937), in collaboration with her brother, Peter Lewis. She also wrote poetry, including the collection December Apples (1935).

=== After 1979 ===
Lewis's Dew on the Grass was republished in 1984 by the Boydell Press in their "Book Masters" series, with an introduction by poet and critic Glenn Cavaliero. In 1996, Cavaliero also compiled and edited A Companionable Talent, a selection of Lewis's occasional pieces, short stories, poems, articles and also her Memoirs, hitherto unpublished. Dew in the Grass and The Captain's Wife were reprinted in 2008, with new introductions by Katie Gramich, for the Honno Press series Welsh Women's Classics.

Lewis's poem "Sing Happy Child" with music by the composer Gaynor Roberts, performed and recorded on 14 December 2019 in St.David's Hall, Cardiff was heard on BBC Wales on Christmas Day 2019. Some of her individual poems, especially "Ship's Sirens" and "The Bride Chest", have been anthologised and are often taught in schools.

== Personal life ==
In February 1937, Lewis married engineer and writer W. Graeme Hendrey. They had one daughter, Katrina. Lewis died in 1979, aged 78.

== Works ==
- Dew on the Grass (1934)
- December Apples (1935), poems
- The Land of Wales (1937), with Peter Lewis
- The Captain's Wife (1943)
- Morning Songs and other poems (1944)
- In Country Places (1951), collected Country Life magazine journalism
- The Leaves of the Tree (1953)
- Honey Pots and Brandy Bottles (1954), more essays from Country Life, with illustrations by Agnes Miller Parker
- Selected Letters of Charles Morgan (1967), editor
- The Old Home (1981), memoirs
- A Companionable Talent: stories, essays & recollections (1996)
