= St Michael and All Angels Church, Kerry =

Coordinates: 52.5018°N 3.2565°W

St Michael and All Angels, Kerry
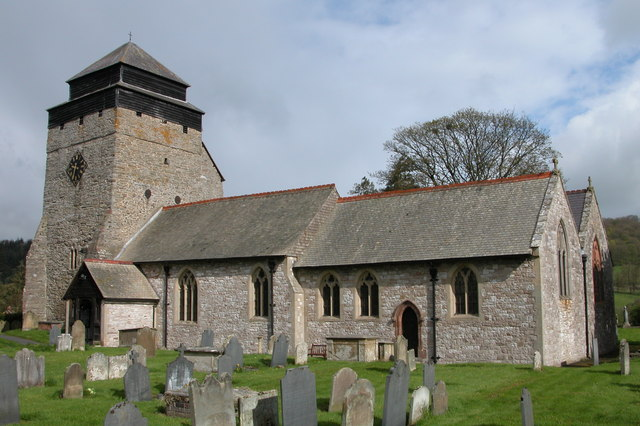
- St Michael and All Angels, Kerry

- Location within Powys
- Location: Kerry, Powys
- Country: Wales
- Denomination: Church in Wales

History
- Founded: Probably 7th century
- Founder: Possibly Cadwgan
- Dedication: St Michael
- Consecrated: 7th century AD

Architecture
- Functional status: Active
- Heritage designation: Grade I
- Designated: 3 October 1953; 73 years ago
- Architect: G.E. Street
- Architectural type: Church
- Style: Medieval and Victorian

Specifications
- Materials: Llanymynech Limestone with Grinshill dressing used in restoration

Administration
- Diocese: St Asaph
- Archdeaconry: Montgomery
- Parish: Kerry

St Michael's Church is the parish church of Kerry, in the historic county of Montgomeryshire, now Powys. Kerry is sited about 3 miles to the S E of Newtown. which suggests that there may have been a church on the site since the 7th century. The church stands in an almost oval churchyard in the centre of the village. It was rebuilt and re-dedicated in 1176. Of the original church only the north aisle arcade survives, and the chancel arcade is 14th-century in date. The square stone tower is surmounted by a Montgomeryshire style timber-framed belfry. The main body of the church was rebuilt in 1882–83 by the architect George Edmund Street, paid for by James Walton of Dolforgan Hall. The church is a Grade I listed building.

== Early history ==
Archdeacon Thomas suggests that originally Kerry was a Welsh collegiate or 'clas' church of the 7th or 8th century, and the church would have been in the Diocese of Llanbadarn, which came to be merged with the Diocese of St Davids. Some indication the earlier history can be gained from the account of the confrontation of between Gerald of Wales, Archdeacon of Brecon, and Adam Bishop of St Asaph in 1175 A.D., when the church was re-dedicated.

== Giraldus and dedication in 1176 ==
In 1176 there was the subject of an altercation between Gerald of Wales, Archdeacon of Brecon, and the bishop of St Asaph who planned to take it into his own diocese. The confrontation is documented by Giraldus A synopsis of this text in English is given by Archdeacon Thomas, and there is a commemorative plaque of 1818 about the event on the west wall of the north aisle. The rededication in 1176, presumably to St Michael, raises the question of an earlier dedication. Thomas pointed out that the bell with the inscription to 'Sante Egevire' (= Gwyr) might give an indication. The new church in 1176 was of stone, the only trace today being the remnants of the nave arcades. With its north and south aisles and perhaps a small chancel occupying what is now the east end of the nave, it was a building of some size and presumably importance. In 1246 Henry de Bretun was presented to the living of 'Sancti Michaelis de Kery', and at this time it was a collegiate establishment. The church was recorded as 'Eccl'ia de Kery' in the 1291 Lincoln Taxation with a value of £20.

== Architecture ==
=== Norman aisle arcades ===
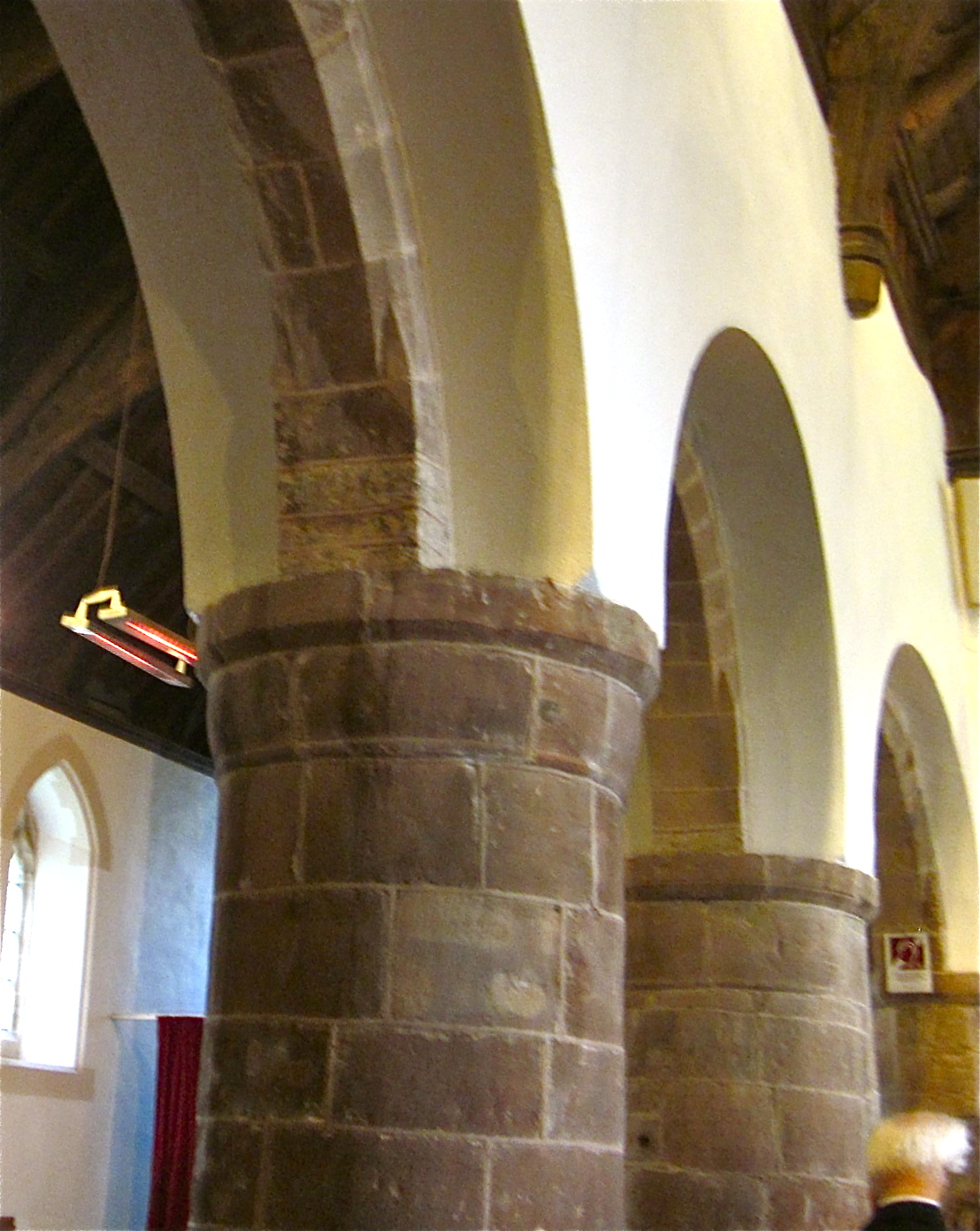
Romanesque Arcade columns

The four Norman arcades with cylindrical columns joined by chamfered rounded arches are possibly the most interesting feature of the church. They are likely to be from the church which was re-dedicated by Gerald of Wales in 1176. They have been the subject of a detailed study by Malcolm Thurlby. During the restoration of the church in 1883 a similar column and parts of the bases of two other columns were found during the re-building of the south wall. The bases are now visible on the outside of the south wall in their original position, which correspond with the columns of the north arcade. This appears to indicate that the 12th-century church had north and south aisles and was similar to aisled arcades at St Cadfan's church at Tywyn in Merionethshire, which has two aisles with Romanesque drum column arcades.

=== Nave and aisle roofing ===
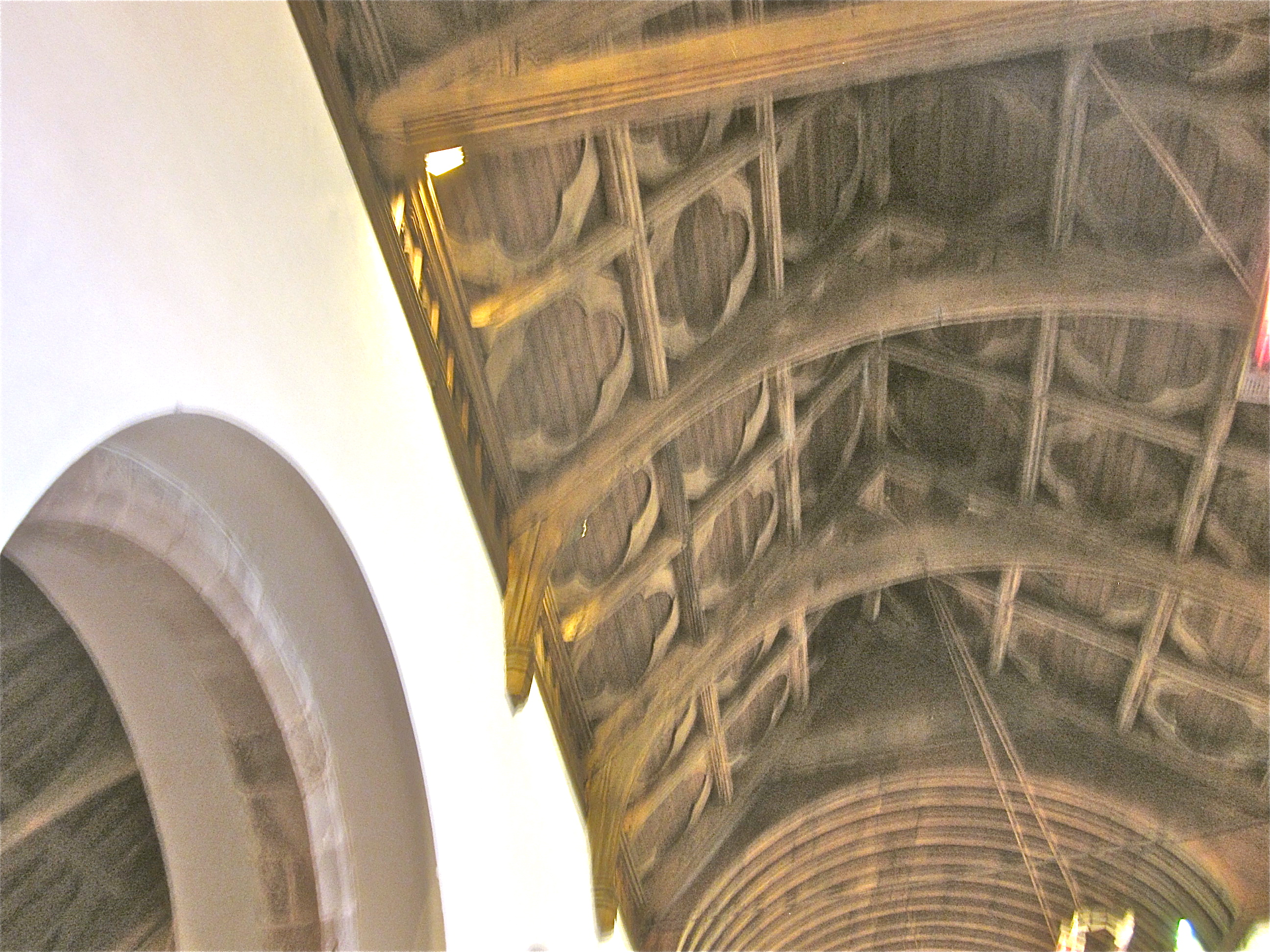
Kerry Church, Montgomeryshire

The nave and aisle have fine 15th-century roofs. The nave has four arch-braced principals or composite cruces and the roof has been strengthened by a triangular truss one third of the way down the nave. The massive beam of this truss has a decorative mould which is likely to be early 16th-century and may represent a strengthening of the structure at the same time as the campanile was placed on the tower. The three tiers of quatrefoils roof wind-braces are likely to belong to the Victorian restoration. In the north aisle, there are arch-braced principals with foiled apex struts and two tiers of decorative wind-braces.

=== Bell-tower and dendrochronology ===
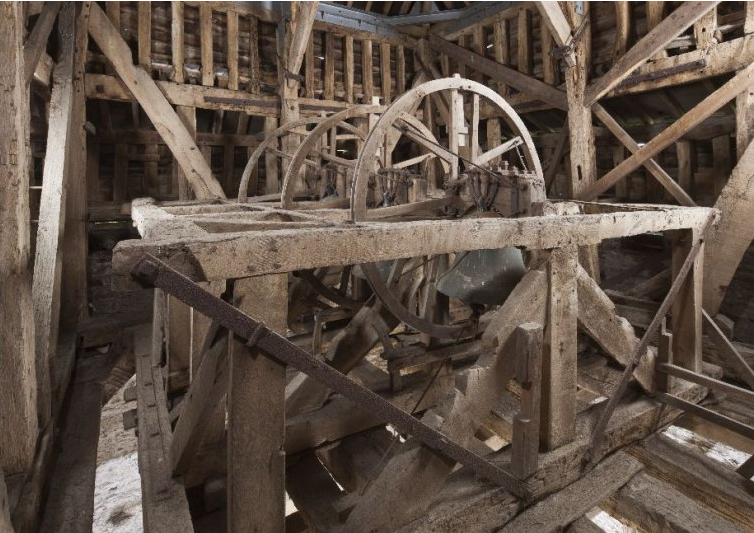
Interior of Bell chamber

Kerry has a stone-built church tower with a timber capping characteristic of many Border churches. The distribution of similar bell towers and churches with timber belfries has been mapped by Hilling, but churches with these towers and belfries occur widely in Shropshire and Herefordshire. The Kerry tower has been strengthened with buttresses to take the weight of the bells, a feature seen on other church towers such as at Bettws Cedewain. The addition of the timber campanile to these churches is likely to have taken place in the early 16th century, and this is supported by the evidence of dendrochronology or tree-dating at Kerry which was undertaken by the RCAHMW It was established that the felling date for the timber in the bell chamber wall frame was winter 1525/26. The felling for the clock chamber ceiling beams was winter 1567/68. The stone-built tower is probably 13th-century, but the bell-stage was modified twice in the 16th century. Tree-ring dating established that the two-tier timber-framed bell-stage was built in winter 1525/26. The bell-chamber floor was found to have been renewed in 1567/68 with very large and closely set beams, presumably to support the weight of a heavy bell-frame The tower houses 3 bells.

=== Chancel ===
The chancel wagon roof was replaced in 1883 and consists of 18 close-set arch-braced trusses springing from wall-plates with trefoil-headed panels. The section over the altar is a restored medieval canopy with moulded arch braces and four purlins. The bosses have been recently re-gilded.

== Restoration and furnishings ==
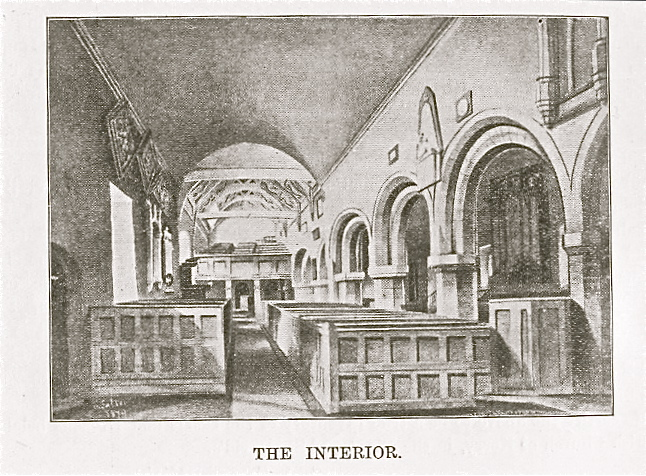
Interior Kerry Church before 1882

The church was transferred from St Davids into the diocese of St Asaph in 1849. In 1853, a report by T. H. Wyatt stated that the structure was in an unsatisfactory condition and should be pulled down but, other than some repairs to the tower, no action was taken. Archdeacon Thomas provides an illustration which shows the interior of Kerry church before the restoration of 1883. The illustration is from the chancel looking down the nave and shows the old box pews. Memorials, now on the west wall are shown above the nave arcade and opposite them are the hatchments now on the aisle wall. A gallery is shown at the west or tower end of the nave.

The pulpit is Victorian, with fragments from the 15th-century screen. The chancel screen and lectern date from the restoration of 1883. The stained-glass east window of the Resurrection is by Charles Eamer Kempe of 1871. Monuments, mainly on the west wall of chancel and aisle, include Margaretta Herbert who died 1838 depicting a female figure with a book, a dove and light descending; Harriet Lang who died 1847 with two Gothic arches and canopy; John Herbert who died 1807, by C. Lewis with a mourning woman leaning on a broken pillar, the capital lying upturned beside; the Reverend John Catlyn, died 1717, a slab with an incised angel; and John Owen Herbert, died 1821, with a draped urn above an oval tablet in a rectangle. There is also a memorial to Richard Jones, died 1788, who was a Royal Navy Purser who founded the Black Hall School and a generous benefactor to the parish. The elaborate memorial consists of two free-standing children, one reading and one writing, beside a yellow marble sarcophagus, with a bust of Jones on top; it cost £525. Details of the trustees' stewardship are inscribed below. In the North aisle there are two hatchments with the arms of the Herberts of Dolforgan Hall.

== Churchyard ==
The churchyard contains war graves of four British soldiers of World War I,

== Gallery ==
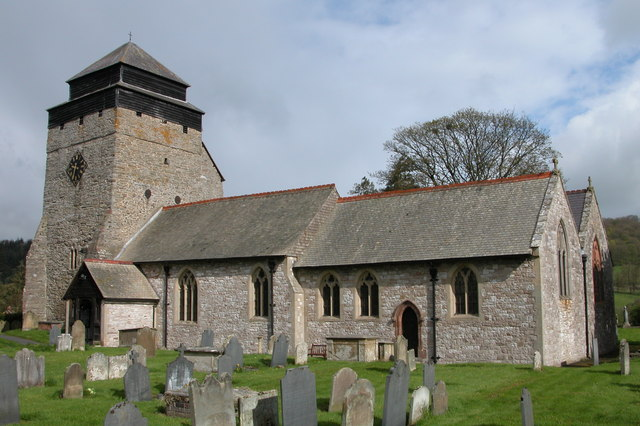
Kerry Church

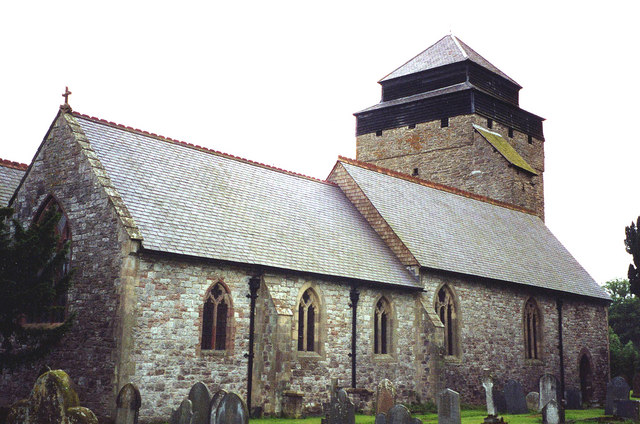
St Michaels and All Angels, Kerry

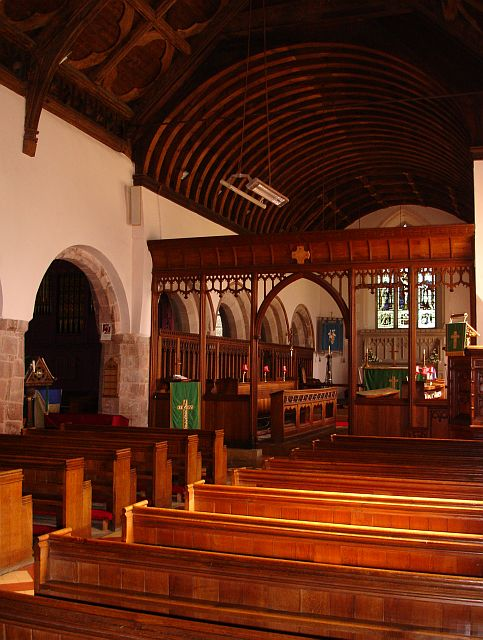
St Michael and All Angels - Interior

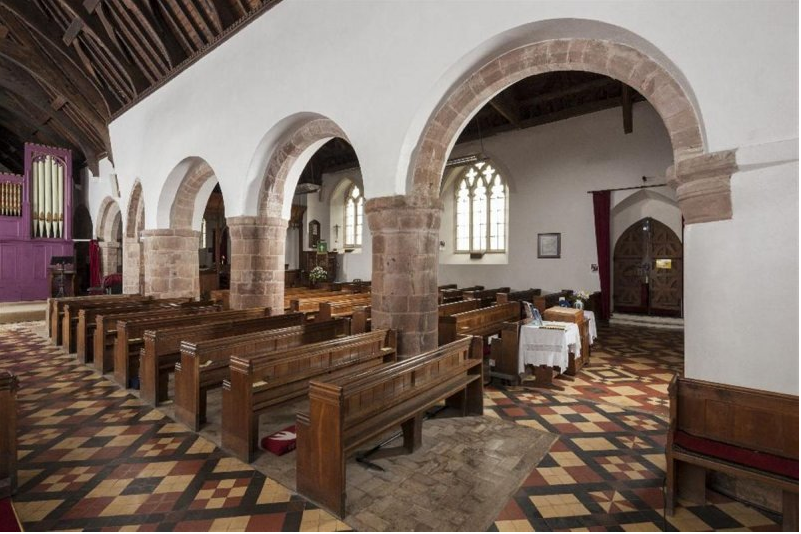
St Michael and All Angels, Kerry

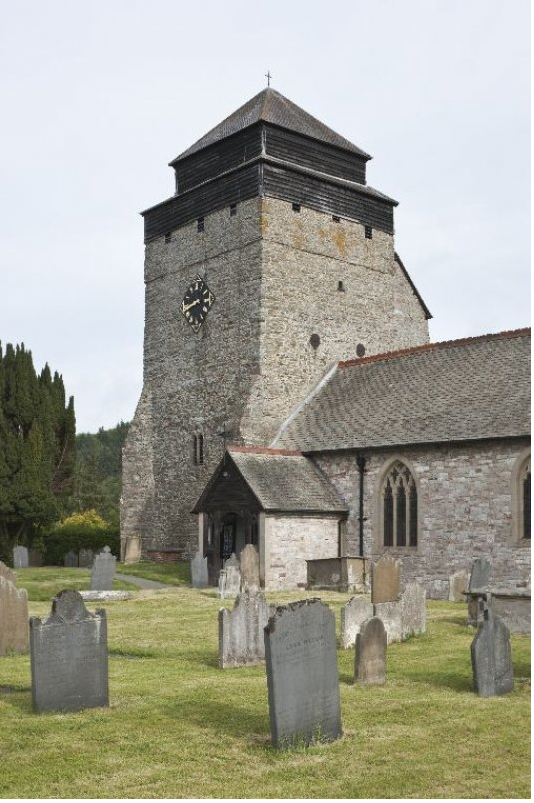
St Michael and All Angels, Kerry. Tower with bell-tower

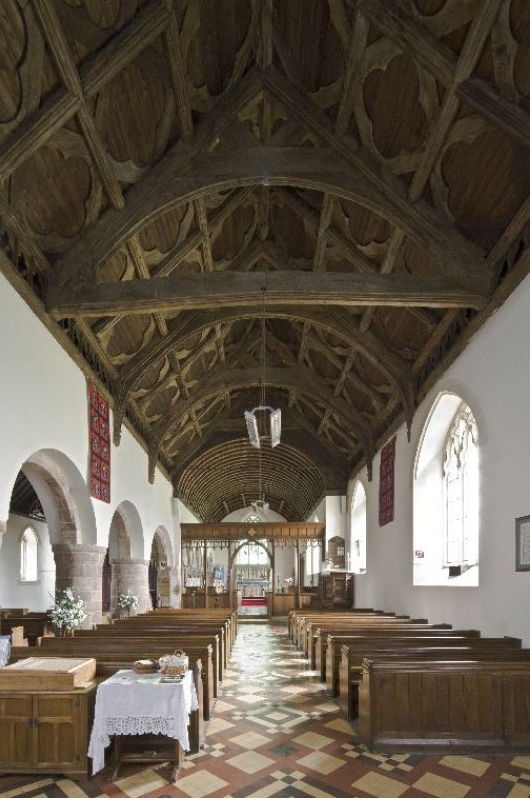
St Michael and All Angels, Kerry

== Rectors and vicars of Kerry ==
This list is abstracted from a more extensive listing given by Archdeacon Thomas.

Rectors

- 1246 Henricus de Bretun
- 1374 Matthew
- 1387 Griffinus Castell
- 1395 Meredydd ap Tudur
- 1397 Madoc ap Philip

Vicars

- 1246 Henricus de Breton
- 1443 Thomas, exchanged with
- 1443 John Hankynson
- ???? Maurice ap Evan Lloyd ap Maurice ap Madoc ap Einion of Mochtre
- 1532 Richard ap Rice
- 1540 Griffith ap Owen
- 1566 Richard Price
- 1614 John ap Rees ap Evan ap Llew
- 1615 Christopher Brains, M.A.
- 1655 Richard Payne, M.A.
- 1672 Spencer Lucy, M.A.
- 1690 John Catlyn, A.M.
- 1697 John Davies D.D.
- 1697 Matthew Morris
- 1703 Tobias Williams
- 1717 John Davies, D.D.
- 1732 Littleton Brown, M.A.
- 1749 Barrett Onslow
- 1758 Joshua Thomas
- 1759 Joshua Carless, B.A.
- 1807 John Jenkins, M.A. ("Ifor Ceri")
- 1830 Horace Monro, M.A.
- 1836 Alfred Ollivant, M.A., D.D.
- 1846 William Morgan, B.D.
- 1879 Owen Alexander Nares, B.D.
- 1897 Thomas Phillips, B.A.
- 1934 Harry George Whiteman, B.A.
- 1941 William Lewis, B.A.
- 1949 William Arthur Davies, B.A.
- 1954 John Idris Jones, B.A.
- 1967 Phillip Bryan Jones, Dip. Theol.
- 1974 David Griffiths, Dip. Theol.
- 1993 Michael Walker
- 2004 Alan Reynolds
- 2008 Mark Chadwick
- 2014 Alexier Mayes

== See also ==
- List of churches in Powys

== Literature ==
- Butler H E. (2005 – new edition), The Autobiography of Gerald of Wales, Woodbridge, 49–56.
- Jerman H. N., (1976), Kerry, the Church and Village, A guide.
- Rowley-Morris E., (1891) History of the Parish of Kerry, Montgomeryshire Collections XXV, including plan and details, pp380–1;
- Scourfield R. and Haslam R. (2013), The Buildings of Wales: Powys; Montgomeryshire, Radnorshire and Breconshire, Yale University Press.pp. 125–6.
- Stevenson D. (2007), The Lordship of Ceri in the Thirteenth Century, Montgomeryshire Collections, pp. 23–31.
- Thomas, D.R.( 1913), History of the Diocese of Saint Asaph, Vol 1, 516.
- Thurlby M., (2005), Romanesque Architecture and Sculpture in Wales, Logaston Press.
