= Mochdre with Penstrowed =

Community in Powys, Wales

Mochdre with Penstrowed: Welsh: Mochdre gyda Phenystrywaid
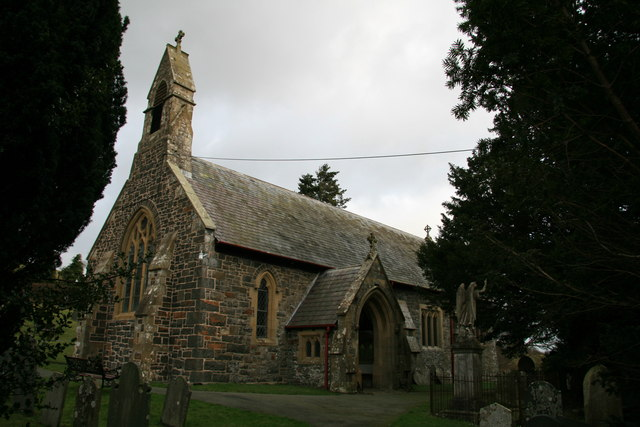
- Population: 494 (2011 census)
- Community: Mochdre with Penstrowed
- Principal area: Powys
- Country: Wales
- Sovereign state: United Kingdom
- List of places UK Wales Powys 52.487970°N 3.368523°W Map of the community

Mochdre with Penstrowed (Welsh: Mochdre gyda Phenystrywaid), or just Mochdre, is a community in Montgomeryshire, Powys, Wales. The community includes Mochdre, Penstrowed (which claims to be the smallest hamlet in Wales) and the much larger settlement of Stepaside. The community was created in 1987 with the merger of separate Mochdre and Penstrowed communities.

The community elects up to seven community councillors to Mochdre with Penstrowed Community Council.

The community had a population of 494 as of the 2011 UK Census.
