= Macmillan Way West =

Long-distance footpath in Somerset and Devon, England

- Length: 102 mi (164 km)
- Location: Somerset and Devon
- Trailheads: Castle Cary/Barnstaple
- Use: Hiking

The Macmillan Way West is a long-distance footpath in Somerset and Devon, England. It runs for 102 miles (164 km) from Castle Cary in Somerset to Barnstaple in Devon. It is one of the Macmillan Ways and connects with the main Macmillan Way at Castle Cary.

The path follows the valley of the River Cary to Somerton, then crosses the Somerset Levels to North Petherton. From Langport to a point near Westonzoyland the route coincides with the River Parrett Trail.

From North Petherton the path climbs the Quantock Hills, and follows the ridge of the hills for several miles, passing their highest point, Will's Neck. It descends through the village of Bicknoller, and then crosses low-level country to Williton and Dunster.

After passing the village of Wootton Courtenay it then climbs to Exmoor at its highest point, Dunkery Beacon. For the last 20 miles (32 km) to Barnstaple, the path follows the route of the Tarka Trail.

The path is waymarked from east to west, but not from west to east.

== Route and points of interest ==
Point	Coordinates (Links to map resources)	OS Grid Ref	Notes
Start	51.087°N 2.513°W	ST641321	Castle Cary
Somerton	51.053°N 2.736°W	ST485284	Somerton
Bow Bridge	51.036°N 2.835°W	ST415266	Langport
Monk's Leaze Clyce	51.048°N 2.844°W	ST408280	Regulates flow into Sowy River
River Tone confluence	51.067°N 2.917°W	ST357302	Located at Burrowbridge
Westonzoyland Pumping Station Museum	51.091°N 2.944°W	ST339328	Westonzoyland
North Petherton	51.092°N 3.019°W	ST287330	North Petherton
Highest point in Quantock Hills	51.109°N 3.193°W	ST165351	Will's Neck
Connection with Coleridge Way	51.149°N 3.272°W	ST110396	Bicknoller
West Somerset Railway	51.164°N 3.308°W	ST085414	Williton
Dunster Castle	51.182°N 3.445°W	SS990435	Dunster
Highest point on Exmoor	51.161°N 3.587°W	SS891415	Dunkery Beacon
End	51.082°N 4.048°W	SS565334	Barnstaple
