= St Nicholas Church, Churchstoke =

Church

Coordinates: 52°32′20″N 3°04′34″W

St Nicholas Church
- Church of St Nicholas
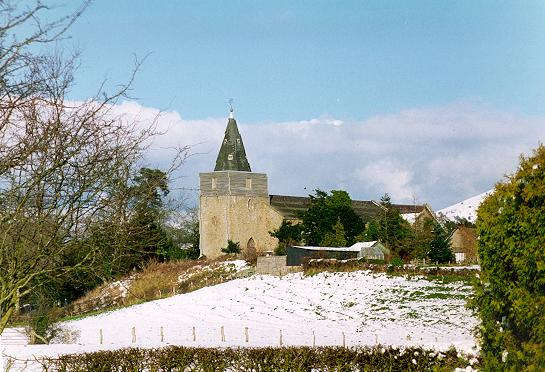
- St Nicholas Church
- Location: Churchstoke, Montgomeryshire, Powys SY15 6AF, Wales
- Denomination: Church of England
- Previous denomination: Roman Catholic
- Website: www.stnicholaschurchstoke.org.uk

History
- Former name: St Mary's Church
- Status: active

Architecture
- Heritage designation: Grade II
- Designated: 1953

Administration
- Diocese: Diocese of Hereford
- Parish: Churchstoke

St Nicholas's Church, formerly called St Mary's Church until 1881, is a Church of England parish church in Churchstoke, Powys, Wales. The church's current building is largely the result of 19th-century reconstruction, but it retains its 13th-century tower with a later timber belfry. From the period prior to the 19th century, only a font, a stoup and a chest have survived up to three phases of restoration and reconstruction. The main body of the church with its large high pitched roof dates to the second half of the 19th century. It is a Grade II listed building.

== History ==
The layout of the churchyard and its location immediately above the River Camlad suggests an early medieval origin. In 1881 the interior was laid out in its present form and the church was rededicated to Saint Nicholas (having previously been dedicated to St. Mary). A church clock was installed in 1887 to commemorate the Diamond Jubilee of Queen Victoria.

The church has a 13th-century square tower at the western end, reduced in height in 1812 with a typical Montgomeryshire style timber-framed belfry and a pyramidal roof which was re-tiled with oak roof shingles in 2005. The tower was used as a place of refuge during 14th century feuds and later in English Civil War battles. In 1646 the Parliamentarians attacked a group of Royalists who were planning to stay overnight at Churchstoke. The Royalists took up a defensive position in the church. During the battle the Parliamentarians set fire to the church door forcing the Royalists to surrender.

In 1751 the south wall of the church was taken down and a new south aisle was constructed. In 1812 the old church was taken down and a new nave was built using stone from Churchstoke Hall and Churchstoke Quarries. It was roofed with slate from Corndon Hill and included a schoolroom and galleries. The present iron columns, made in Coalbrookdale, presumably carried the galleries. The columns have octagonal stone bases and square decorative capitals; they now support the lowered roof-line. In 1881 the north and south walls of the chancel were rebuilt, and a new south porch was added. The aisles are divided from the nave by arcades of six bays above which is a frieze of timber arcading.

The chancel is supposed to have been added in 1867 and is narrower than the nave. There are encaustic floor tiles throughout the chancel and sanctuary, and the tiled reredos has recently been uncovered. There is a piscina in the south wall of the chancel, and three 19th-century brasses. These were probably added in 1867. The south transept houses the organ and the north transept forms the choir vestry underneath which is the boiler house. A number of bullet holes from musket shots from the skirmishes in the Civil War can still be seen even following the restorations, notably on the soffit of the upper storey round-headed window on the north wall of the tower.

St Nicholas Church was granted Grade II listed status in 1953. It was listed because it "is of special historical interest for its successive reconstructions and retains elements of each, from the well preserved medieval tower, to the work of the early C19, to the remodelling of 1867."

=== Legend ===
According to a local legend, the church in the nearby hamlet of Hyssington has a miniature bull buried beneath the church step. It is said that the bull terrorised the neighbourhood until it was exorcised by twelve priests.

== Referendum ==
In 1914, the Welsh Church Act 1914 was passed by the Parliament of the United Kingdom to disestablish the Church in Wales from the Church of England. Owing to the enactment being delayed by the Suspensory Act 1914, seventeen parishes (including Churchstoke) were balloted by the Welsh Church Commissioners in 1915 in a referendum as to whether they wanted to join the new Church in Wales or stay with the Church of England. This was because the ecclesiastical parish boundaries crossed the England-Wales border. St Nicholas parishioners voted 390–75 to remain part of the Church of England despite the church being located in Wales. As a result of the decision in the ballot, St Nicholas Church remained a part of the Diocese of Hereford.

== See also ==
- List of churches in Powys
