= Cross Britain Way =

280-mile footpath in England and Wales

The Cross Britain Way is a hiking trail of 280 miles (450 km) across England and Wales. Its starting point is Boston on the east coast of England and it finishes in Barmouth on the Welsh coast (or vice versa). It was launched in September 2014 and is one of the Macmillan Ways, a group of paths created to raise funds for Macmillan Cancer Support. It is fully waymarked, and a comprehensive guidebook comprising route directions, maps, photographs and an accommodation list has been published and can be obtained from Macmillan Ways Association.

The path is recognised by the Long Distance Walkers Association.

The terrain varies from the flat land of The Fens to the Welsh Berwyn Mountains. There is a total of 7,597 metres (24,925 ft) of ascent, and the highest point reached is at 521 metres (1,709 ft).
