= Mochdre, Powys =

Coordinates: 52.487970°N 3.368523°W

Mochdre
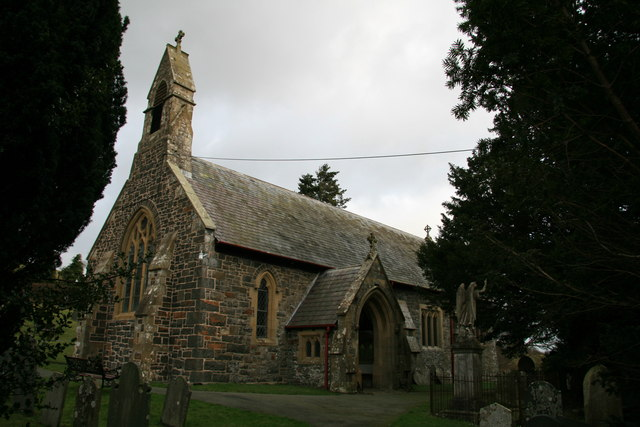
- Church of All Saints

- Location within Powys
- OS grid reference: SO09449009
- Community: Mochdre with Penstrowed
- Principal area: Powys
- Country: Wales
- Sovereign state: United Kingdom
- Post town: NEWTOWN
- Postcode district: SY16
- Police: Dyfed-Powys
- Fire: Mid and West Wales
- Ambulance: Welsh
- UK Parliament: Montgomeryshire and Glyndŵr

Mochdre (Welsh pronunciation) is a small village in the community of Mochdre with Penstrowed, in Montgomeryshire, Powys, Wales.

== Geography ==
About 3 miles (4.8 km) southwest of Newtown, it is near the River Severn. Its tributary, Mochdre Brook runs through the village in a narrow steep-sided valley.

== Name ==
- Etymology of Mochdre ("Pig Town"): The name Mochdre derives from the Welsh words moch (pigs/swine) and tre/dref (settlement or town).
- The Fourth Branch (Math fab Mathonwy): According to the fourth branch of the Mabinogi, the legendary trickster and magician Gwydion stole a herd of sacred, otherworldly pigs from King Pryderi of Dyfed in South Wales.
- The Journey Through Powys: As Gwydion drove the magical swine north toward Gwynedd, he stopped at various locations overnight to build temporary encampments or sties for the herd. The text explicitly records that on their trek between Ceri (Kerry) and Arwystli, they rested overnight at a settlement in Mid Wales—giving birth to the name Mochdre.
- Association with All Saints Church: Local folklore and regional tradition link the ancient church enclosure (or llan) at Mochdre to the original site of this legendary mythological stopping point, grounding the pre-Christian mythic geography of the Mabinogion directly into the historic heart of the parish.

== History ==
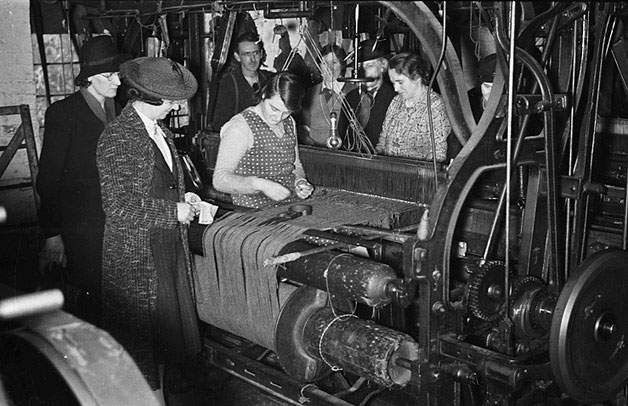
Tweed making at the Leach family woollen mill, 1940

In 1872 it was a parish in the Newtown district called Moughtrey or Mochtref, with Eskirgilog and Moughtreyllan townships. At that time, there were 95 houses, a population of 526, and covered an area of 5,025 acres (2,034 ha).

Lake Mochdre, a former reservoir, later a fish farm, now a fishing venue, was created by damming a tributary stream.

== All Saint Church, Mochdre ==
All Saints Church in Mochdre, located approximately three miles southwest of Newtown in Powys, has a history spanning over eight centuries, evolving from a medieval ecclesiastical parish into its present Victorian form.

=== Early Medieval Beginnings (12th–13th Century) ===
- 12th Century Foundation: Religious activity on the site above the Mochdre Brook dates back to at least the 12th century.
- Ecclesiastical Appropriation: In 1287, the church was appropriated by Thomas Bek, Bishop of St Davids.
- 1291 Pope Nicholas Taxatio: Listed under its historical valuation, the church was assessed at a value of £3 6s 8d.

=== Post-Medieval Developments (15th–18th Century) ===
- Diocesan Transfer (1862): The parish of Mochdre was officially transferred from the Diocese of St Davids to the Diocese of St Asaph.
- Victorian Reconstruction (1864–1867): Due to severe structural decay, the original medieval building was taken down. Between 1864 and 1867, architect Edward Haycock Jr. of Shrewsbury supervised a full rebuild on the existing medieval foundations at a total cost of £1,204.
- Preserved Medieval Elements: While almost all interior fittings were renewed in the 1860s, the builders retained and reincorporated the original 15th-century timber roof trusses with modifications. Local benefactors donated decorative elements, including the east stained-glass window, carved wooden angels, roof bosses, and sanctuary chairs.
- Re-opening (1867): The rebuilt church officially reopened for services in 1867 and remains an active parish church within the Church in Wales.

=== The 14th-Century Wooden Rood Figures ===
The 14th-century wooden rood figures discovered at All Saints Church represent one of the most remarkable ecclesiastical survivals in Wales.

- Concealment and Survival: During the Protestant Reformation in the 16th century, thousands of medieval church carvings—including rood figures depicting Christ on the cross flanked by the Virgin Mary and St. John—were ordered to be destroyed or removed. Local parishioners in Mochdre hid the carvings on top of the church wall-plate, where they remained undisturbed for over three centuries.
- Rediscovery (1867): The wooden figures were uncovered in 1867 tucked away above the wall-plate during the complete demolition and rebuild of the church.
- National Significance: The carvings are exceptionally rare: the figure of the crucified Christ from Mochdre is one of only four surviving pre-Reformation rood figures in the whole of Britain. A companion carving of the Virgin Mary was also recovered alongside it.
- Preservation and Legacy: The original medieval oak figures were initially kept in the Powysland Museum in Welshpool before being transferred to Amgueddfa Cymru (National Museum Wales) in Cardiff for permanent conservation. A full-scale, painted replica of the Mochdre Christ figure—reconstructed to display its original medieval appearance 650 years ago—is displayed at St Teilo's Church inside the St Fagans National Museum of History.

== Notable People ==
Mochdre Is the home of Welsh International Football Player Carrie Jones

== Governance ==
Since the May 1999 local government elections the community has been covered by the electoral ward of Llandinam, which elects a county councillor to Powys County Council.
