= Trelystan =

Coordinates: 52.628126°N 3.089548°W

St Mary’s Church, Trelystan
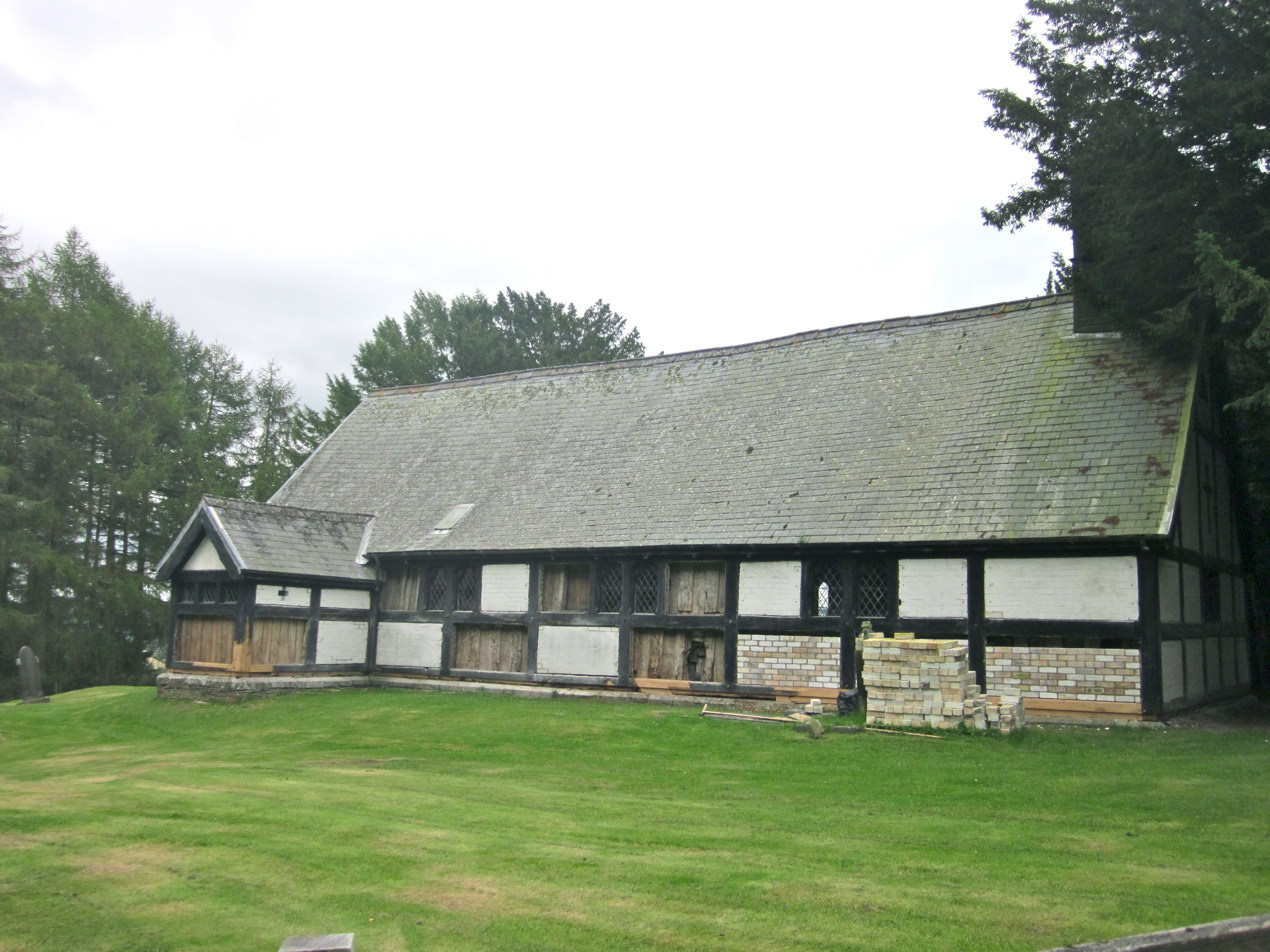
- St Mary’s Church, Trelystan

- Location within Powys
- Location: Trelystan, Powys
- Country: Wales
- Denomination: Church of England

Architecture
- Heritage designation: Grade II*
- Designated: 26 October 1953
- Architectural type: Church
- Style: Timber-framed

Specifications
- Materials: Timber Framing with brick and stone outer skin

Administration
- Diocese: Hereford
- Archdeaconry: Ludlow
- Parish: Trelystan

Trelystan is a remote parish and township on the border of what was the historic county of Montgomeryshire with Shropshire. Trelystan now forms part of the community of Forden with Leighton and Trelystan in Powys, having previously been its own community until 1987. Trelystan was a chapel of ease within the parish of Worthen and it also served the township of Leighton. In some old sources the parish is also referred to as Wolston Mynd.

== History ==
Elystan Glodrydd, who died in 1010AD, was possibly buried at Trelystan, as the Welsh placename could derive from Cappell Tref Elistan. This is first mentioned in the Harleian Manuscript 1973, written by Jacob Chaloner:

Elistan Glodrith, or Edelstan the renowned, borne in the Castell of Hereford, anno 933, and in the 9 yeare of Edlistan, K of Saxons, who was his godfather, was Earle of Hereford, and Lord of the countrey above Offa dich, betwene Wy and Severne, in tyme of Edelred, K of Saxons. He dyed & was buried at Cappell Tref Elistan in Causeland.

In 1485, Long Mountain by Trelystan was the muster point of the Welsh army of Henry Tudor, led by military commander Sir Rhys ap Thomas. They marched from there to Bosworth Field, where they defeated King Richard III. Sir Rhys’ wife Efa (English: ‘Eva’) was a direct descendant of Elystan via his grandson Idnerth ap Cadwgan ab Elystan. In 1854 Leighton became a separate parish and in 1874 Trelystan also became a parish. In 1933 Trelystan, Leighton and Rhos Goch parishes were combined into a larger Trelystan parish.

Trelystan is now within the Chirbury parish grouping in the Church of England Diocese of Hereford and within the Archdeaconry of Ludlow.

== St Mary's Church ==
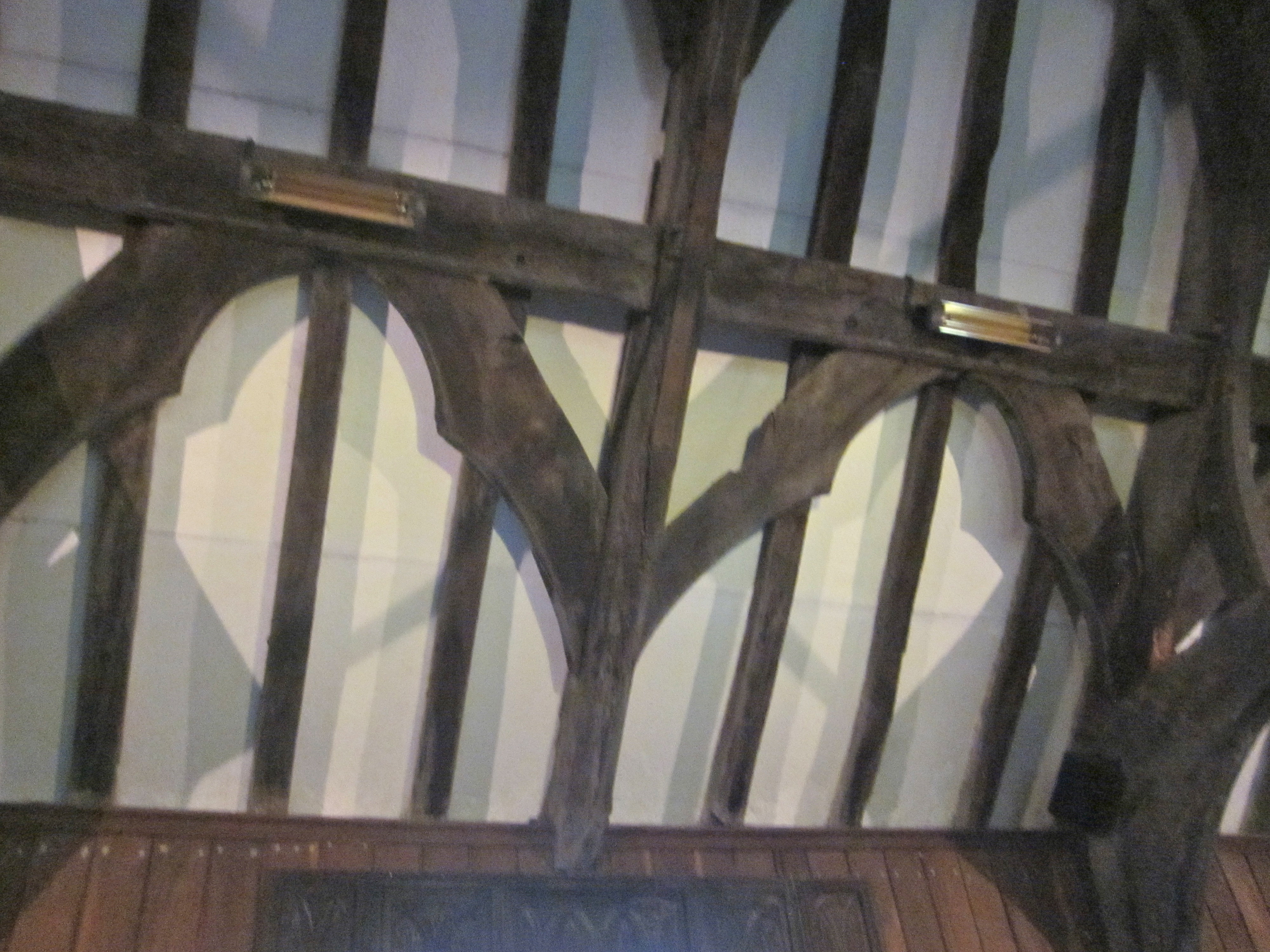
Trelystan Church, Decorative windbraces

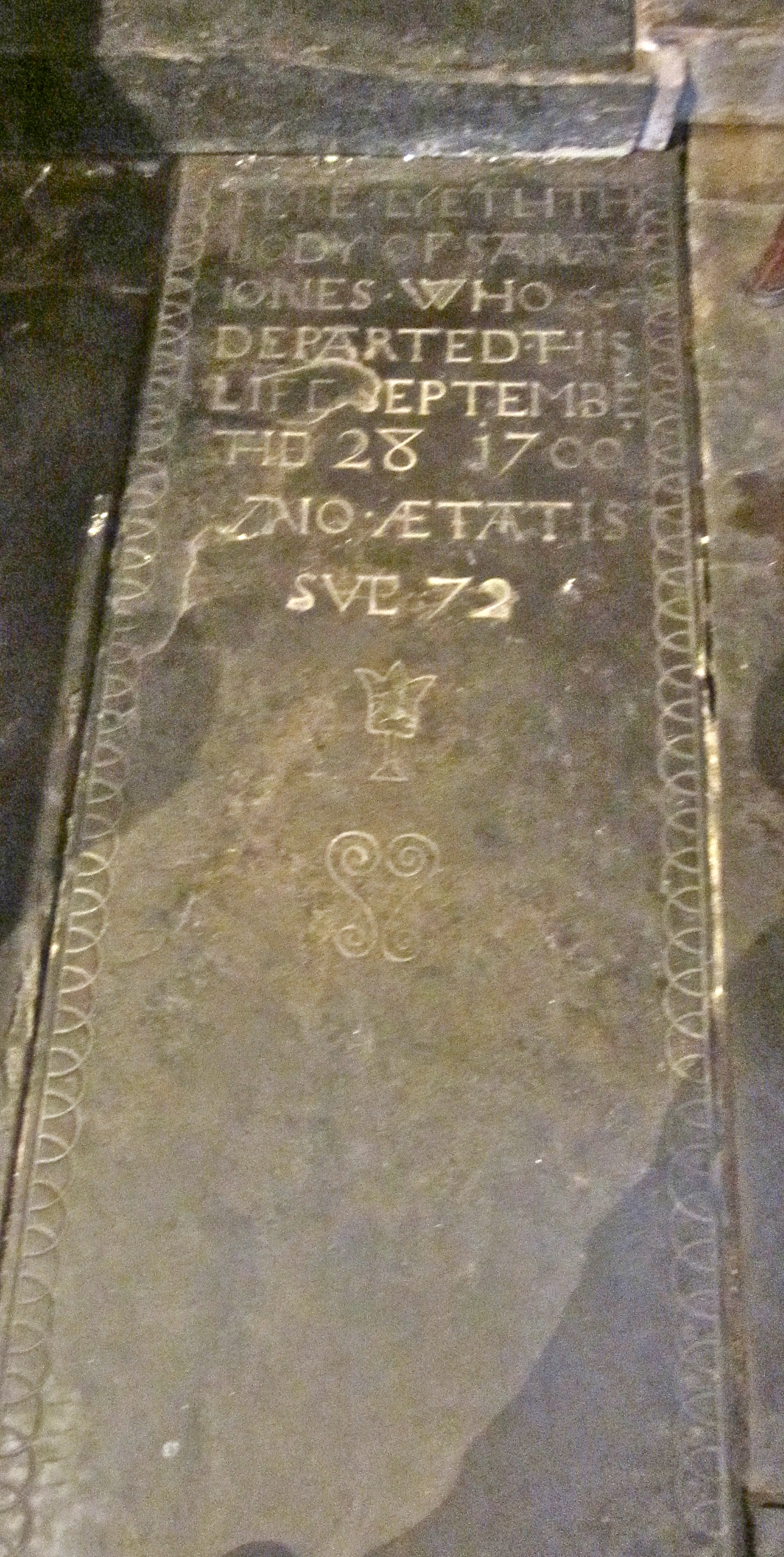
Tombstone of Sarah Jones, who died in 1700, aged 72

St Mary's Church, Trelystan is sited 900 feet up at the S end of the Long Mountain to the east of Welshpool. The building is unique in Montgomeryshire as it is timber-built. With a single-chamber, a south porch and west belfry; the original timber-framed building is likely to be 15th or 16th century in date. It was restored in 1856 with an outer timber framed casing with brick nogging outside and matchboarding inside.

The church was restored again in September 2014 revealing that the intact original timber-framing. Wooden panels were used to infill the framework, rather than the normal wattle and daub. Possibly at a later date lathes had been nailed to the framing, and this had then been torched, such that the outside of the church, before the 1856 restoration, would have presented a smooth rendered surface.

The church has simple 19th-century cusped timber windows. The 15th-century roof of principals and arched braces has two tiers of trefoiled wind-braces. Every other truss is strengthened with a tie-beam, now sawn off, and replaced with iron tie rods. The flagstone floor is inset with 17th- and 18th-century memorial slabs at the East end.

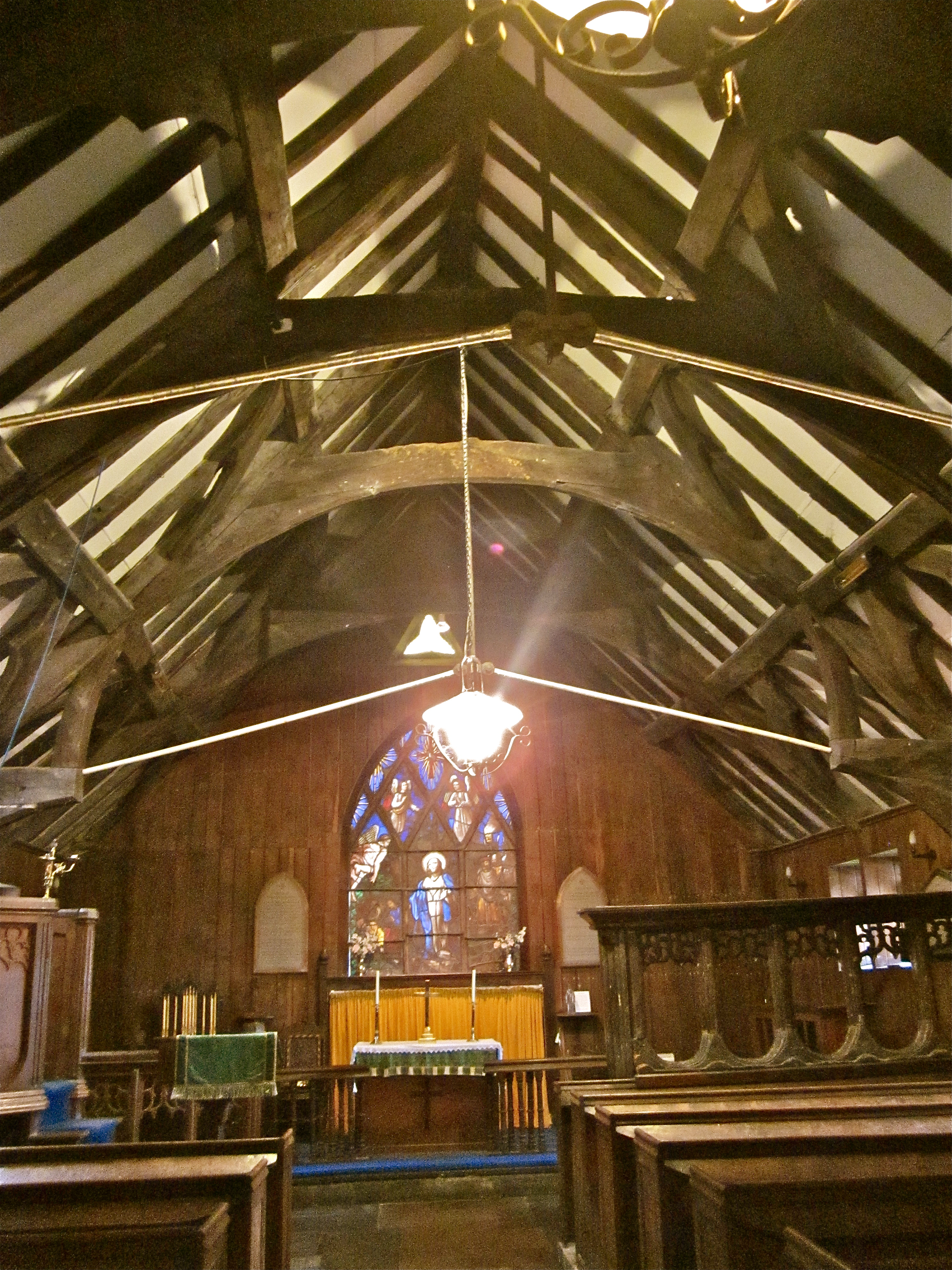
Trelystan Church. Rood screen on right

The square wooden bell turret has a slatted lower stage and a second stage consisting of two square-headed louvred apertures in each face. There is a pyramidal slate roof surmounted by a wrought iron weathervane. The truss at the west end defines the position of the former gallery, which was originally reached by a ladder stair set in the north-west corner. Four modern chamfered uprights support what is now the bell turret. Behind these the ceiling slopes downwards broken only by the window aperture above. The front of the bell turret, formerly the gallery, has close-set studs, plastered between, with a large thick beam for the top rail.

=== Church furnishings ===
The rood screen of five lights survive, without cresting, but with five different ogee tracery heads robustly carved in oak. Crossley observed that the semicircular heads and boarding at the base are characteristic of the Dee Valley screens and resemble the screen at St Melangell’s Church, Pennant Melangell. The screen looks out of place in its present position which indicates that it may have originally come from Chirbury Priory at the time of the Dissolution. The altar rails have turned balusters and date from c. 1700. The Barrel Organ was made by S. Parsons of London in 1827 and features a Gothic Revival case. Old box pews are reused as wainscot.

The stained glass in the east window is called The Agony in the Garden, and is perhaps by David Evans.

The churchyard is a small, almost rectangular enclosure which looks to have been extended to the north-east and perhaps to the south-west. Reached by a track across fields, six yews of considerable age encircle the west side of the church; the largest being by the south porch. Close to this yew lays a tombstone to the three men who were killed during the construction of Leighton Church.

=== Gallery ===
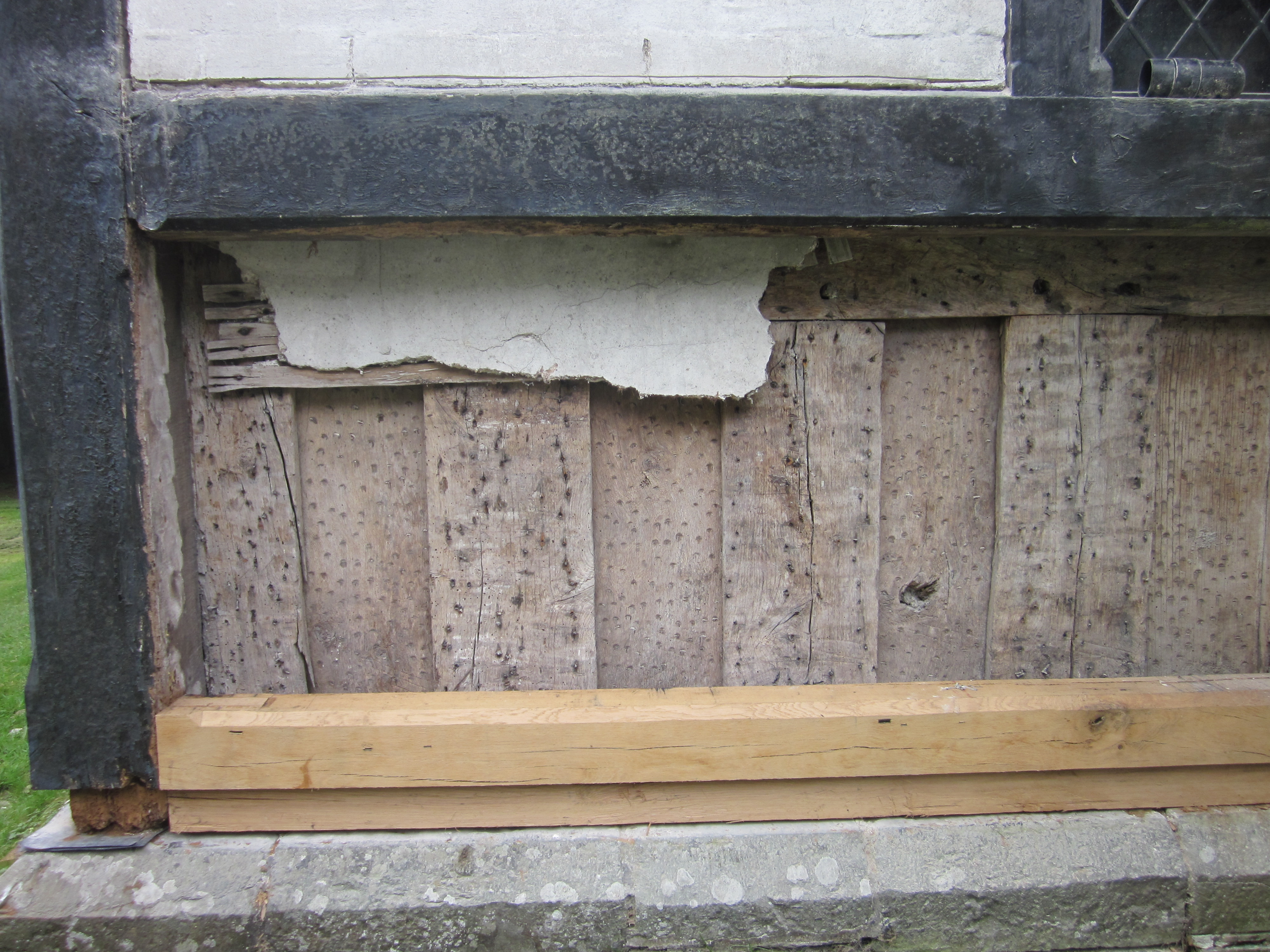
Trelystan Church Panelling with lathes and render over.

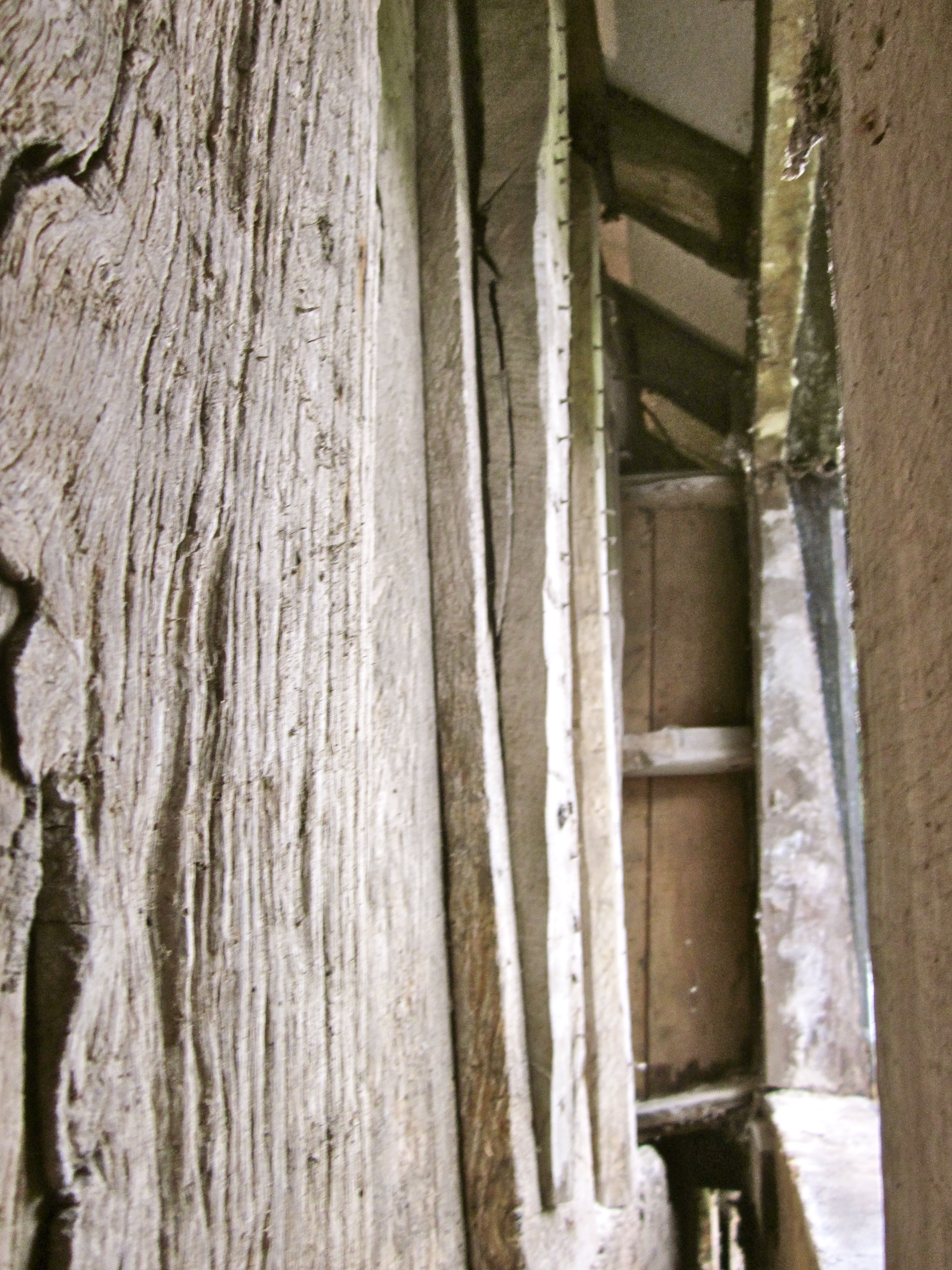
Trelystan Church. Gap between panelling and outer timber frame.

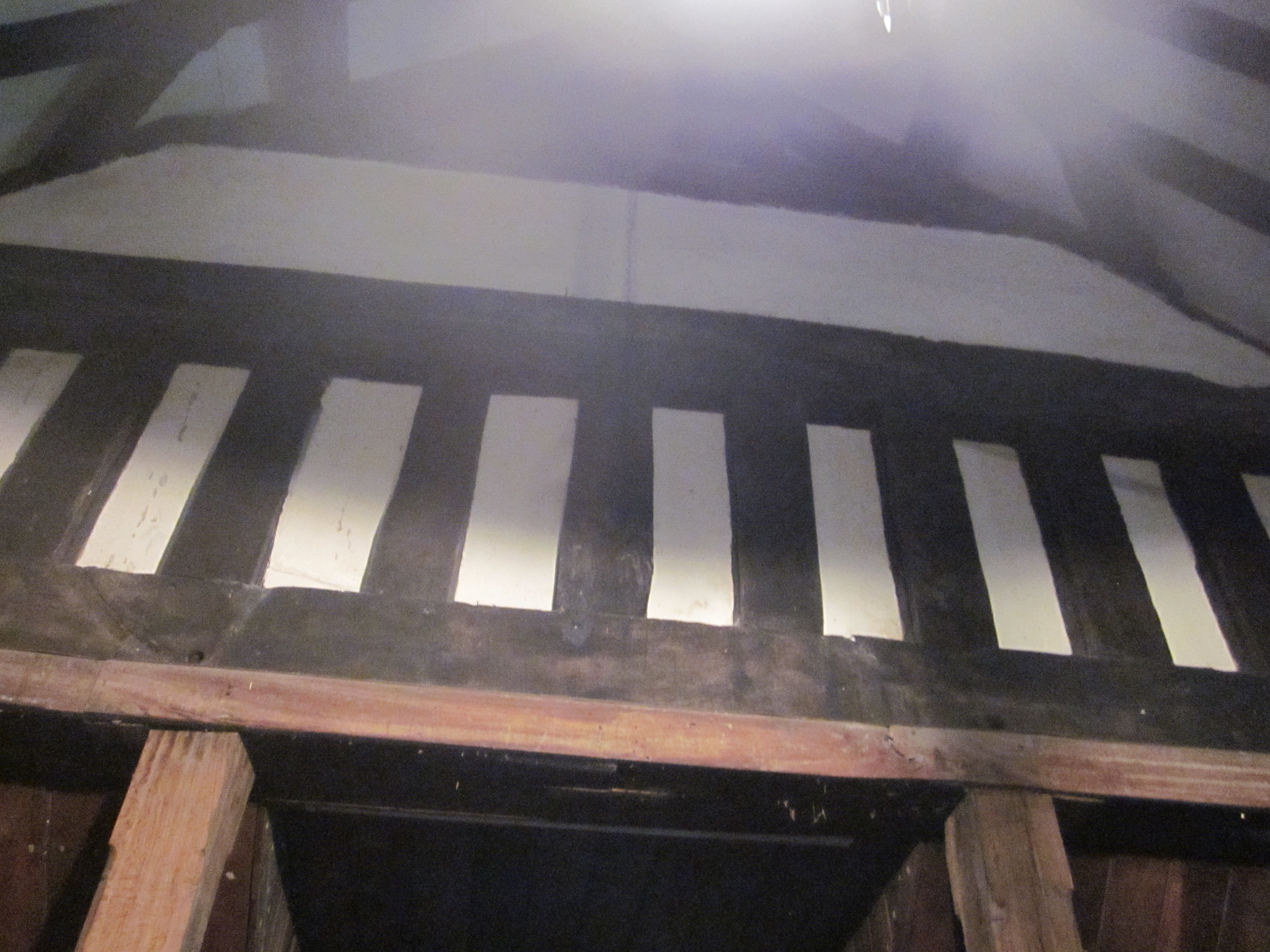
Trelystan Church Gallery at west end of nave.

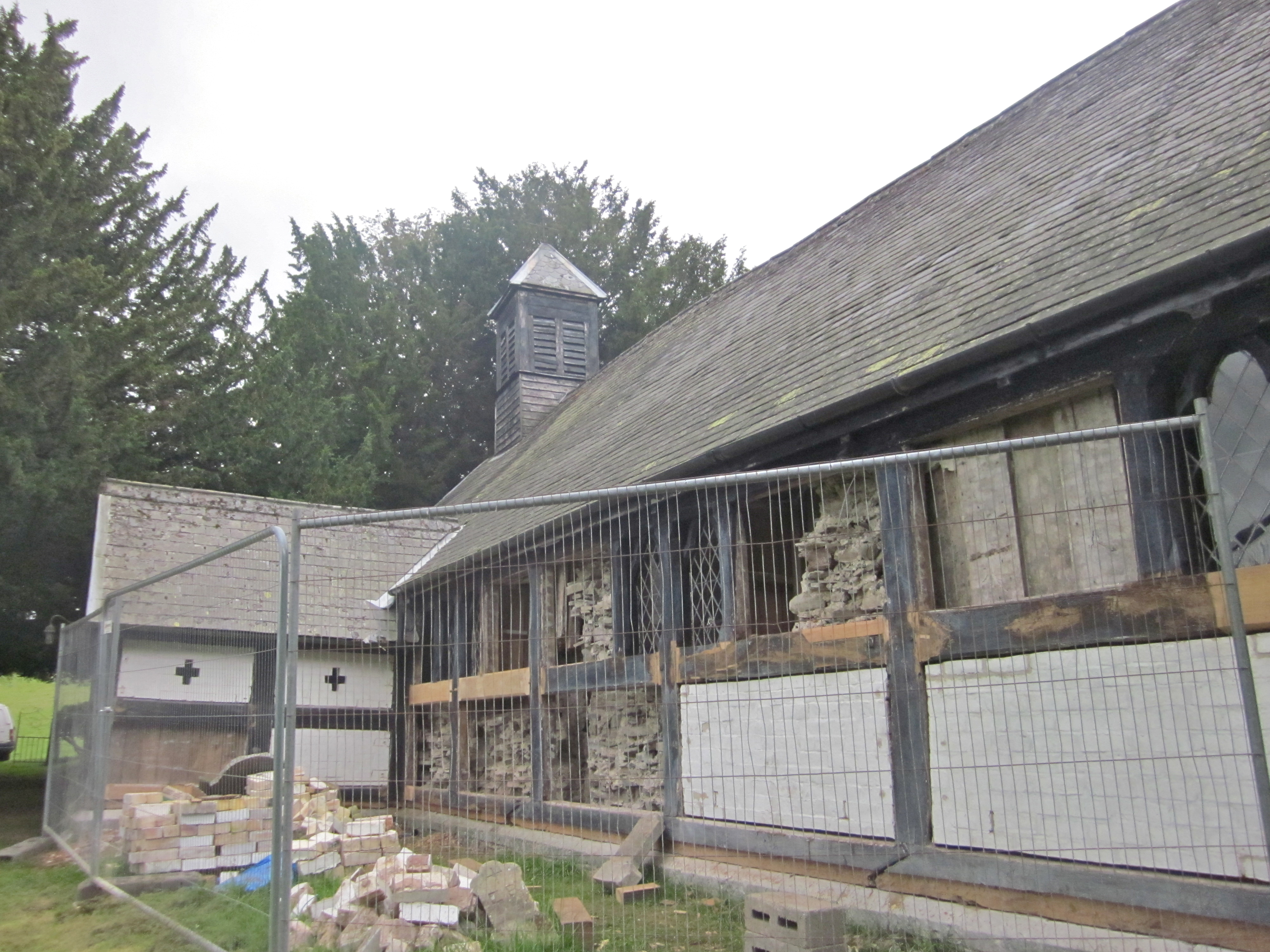
Trelystan Church, South side - some stone infill.

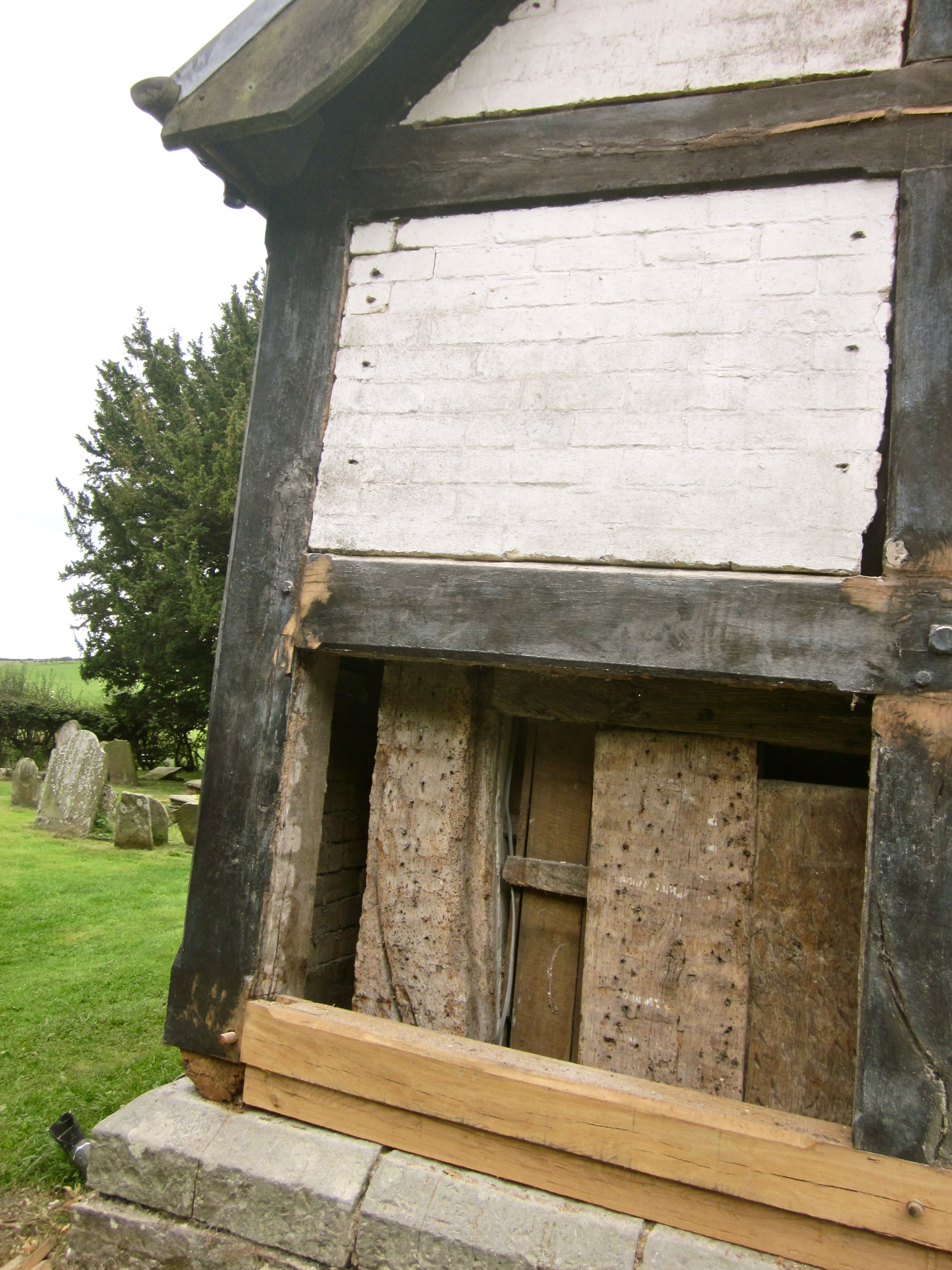
Trelystan Church, Montgomeryshire

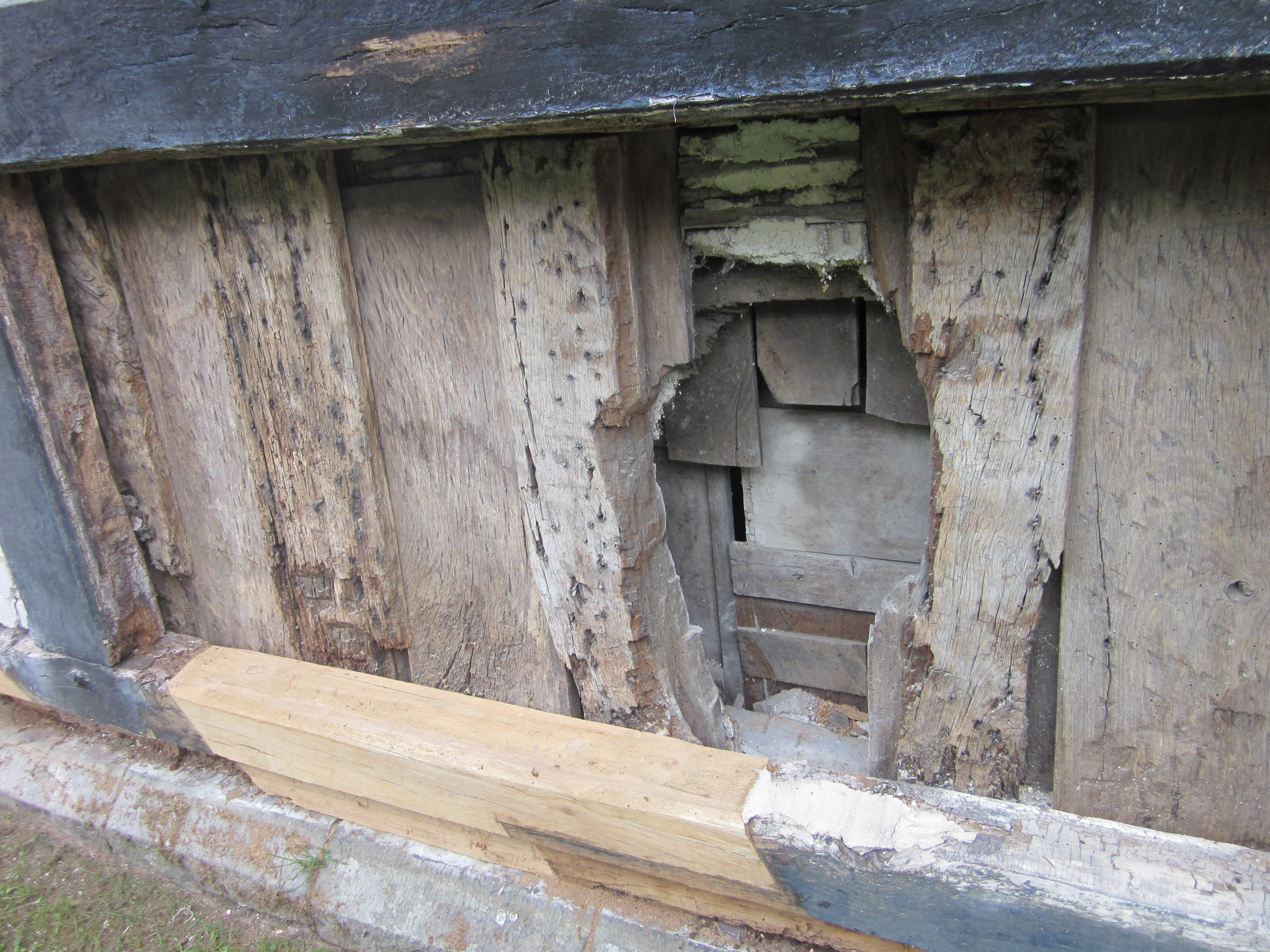
Trelystan Church, Montgomeryshire

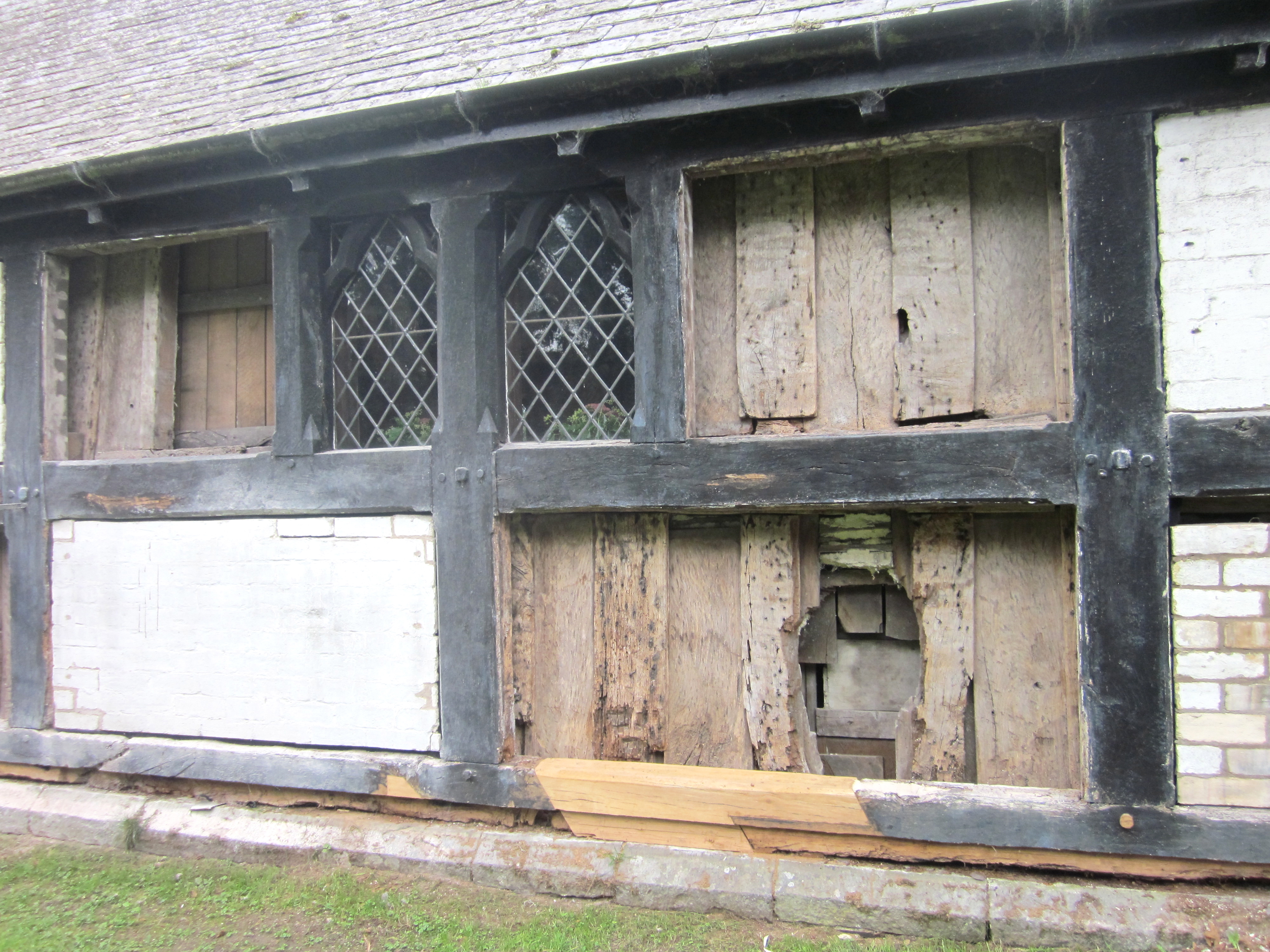
Trelystan Church, Montgomeryshire

== Literature ==
- Scourfield R and Haslam R, (2013) Buildings of Wales: Powys; Montgomeryshire, Radnorshire and Breconshire, 2nd edition, Yale University Press, p. 133–134.
- Smith P, Houses of the Welsh Countryside, 2nd ed 1988, Maps 55, 58, 59;
