= Penstrowed =

Coordinates: 52.508°N 3.371°W

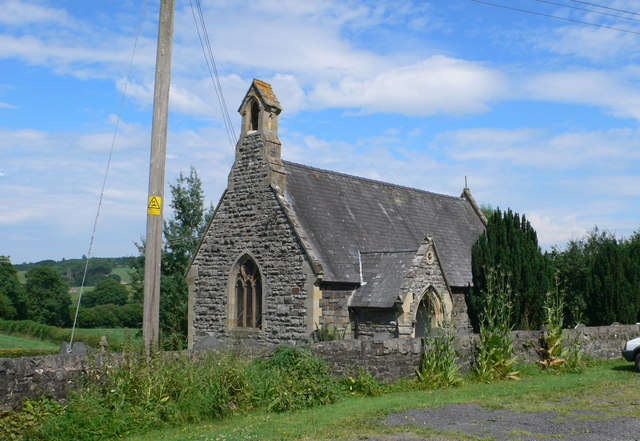

- Location within Powys
- Community: Mochdre with Penstrowed
- Principal area: Powys
- Preserved county: Powys
- Country: Wales
- Sovereign state: United Kingdom
- Post town: Newtown
- Police: Dyfed-Powys
- Fire: Mid and West Wales
- Ambulance: Welsh
- UK Parliament: Montgomeryshire and Glyndŵr
- Senedd Cymru – Welsh Parliament: Montgomeryshire

Penstrowed is a historic Montgomeryshire parish to the west of Newtown, now in the community of Mochdre with Penstrowed, Powys, Wales.

== Description ==
Penstrowed is situated in the river Severn valley. The founder of the church, Saint Gwrhai was a 5th-century saint who is supposed to have been buried in the churchyard. The Penstrowed Quarry was an important source for local stone and was used for building the Caersws workhouse. It was later acquired by Montgomeryshire County Council and a railway siding connecting the quarry to Cambrian main line laid in 1902 and closed in May 1937.

Penstrowed now claims to be 'The smallest hamlet in Wales'. It is governed by the Mochdre with Penstrowed Community Council. Until 1 April 1987 Penstrowed was a community itself.

Eiluned Lewis (1900–1979), a Welsh novelist, poet, and journalist came from here.

== Church ==
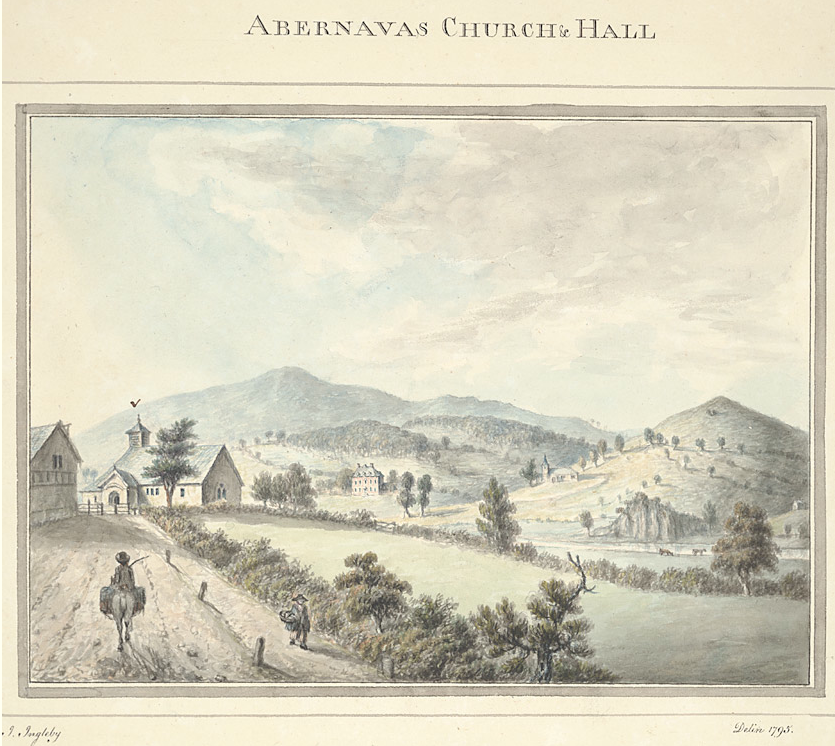
Penstrowed Church in 1795

The church of Saint Gwrhai is a very small single-chamber church with bellcote and S porch. Neatly rebuilt in 1864 by Edward Jones. Decorated period east and west windows, with stained glass by James Powell and Sons by Powell's, 1864: Christ appearing to the three Marys. There is a monument to the Rev. John Herbert who died in 1876. Next to the church is a corrugated iron church hall.

== Houses and chapel ==
Glanhafren Hall is a brick three-bay, three-storey front range of c. 1810. The block, one room deep, contains a two-flight stair with honeysuckle ironwork balusters in a segmental recess, and two rooms with classical plaster cornices.

Glandulais is a small Late Georgian house of two storeys and four bays—the windows mostly tripartite with cambered heads. Staircase with fluted balusters. In the drawing room a ceiling with trophy motifs in an oval of leaves, and a frieze of garlands.

Penstrowed Methodist Chapel was built during the mid-nineteenth century. It is stone built in the Vernacular style with a gable entry plan and small-pane flat-headed windows. By 2002 this chapel had been converted for use as a store.

== Literature ==
- Scourfield R. and Haslam R. (2013), The Buildings of Wales: Powys; Montgomeryshire, Radnorshire and Breconshire, Yale University Press. pg 235.

== Penstrowed gallery ==
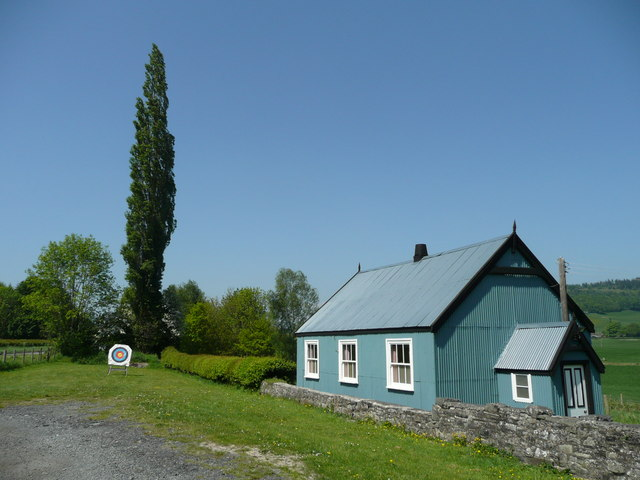
Church hall

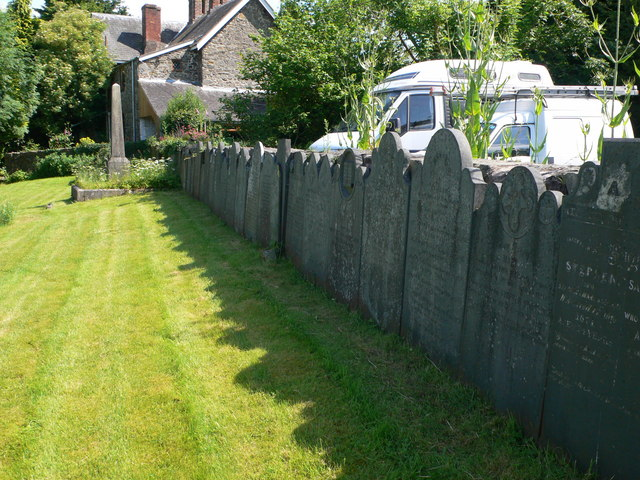
Churchyard, Penstrowed

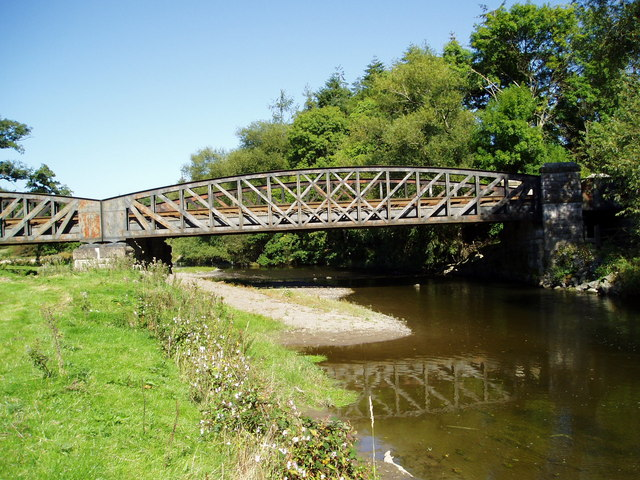
River Severn, Penstrowed railway bridge

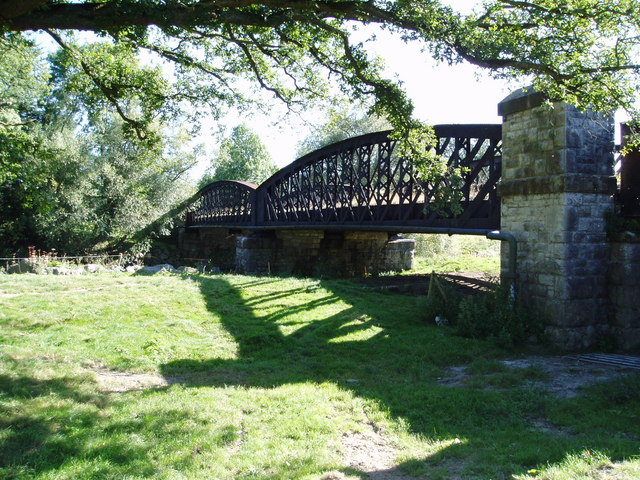
River Severn, Penstrowed railway bridge

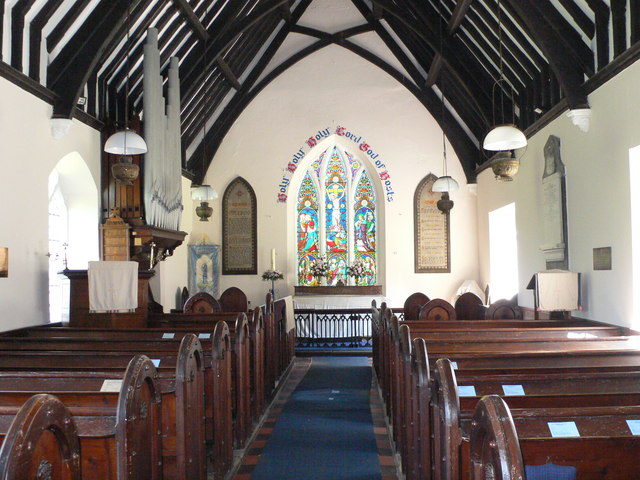
St Gwrhai, Penstrowed
