= Gwrhai =

Welsh saint of disputed historicity

Saint Gwrhai was a 5th-century saint of Wales.

He is known from a 10th-century hagiography and is of disputed historicity. He was reputedly the founder of the Church at Penstrowed, Montgomeryshire, and one at Caerleon. He was a colleague of Deiniol and was a son of Caw of Strathclyde. He is supposedly buried in the churchyard at Penstrowed.
