= Forden =

Forden: Welsh: Ffordun
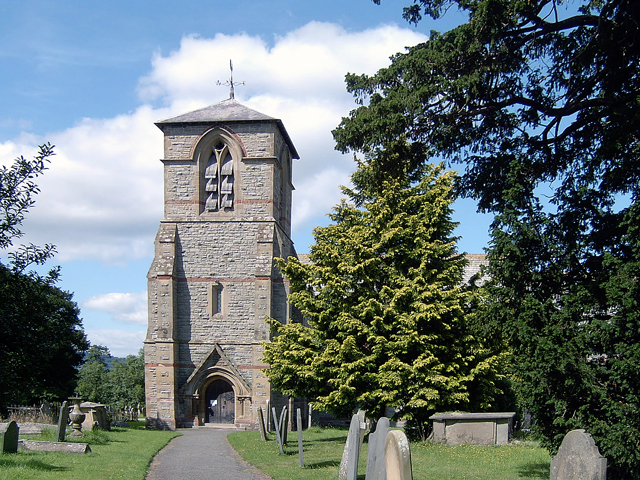
- St Michaels, Forden

- Location within Powys
- Population: 1,426 (2011)
- OS grid reference: SJ227010
- Community: Forden with Leighton and Trelystan
- Principal area: Powys
- Preserved county: Powys
- Country: Wales
- Sovereign state: United Kingdom
- Post town: WELSHPOOL
- Postcode district: SY21
- Dialling code: 01938
- Police: Dyfed-Powys
- Fire: Mid and West Wales
- Ambulance: Welsh
- UK Parliament: Montgomeryshire and Glyndŵr
- Senedd Cymru – Welsh Parliament: Gwynedd Maldwyn
- List of places UK Wales Powys 52.602°N 3.143°W Community map: Map of the community

Forden (Welsh: Ffordun) is a village near Welshpool in Powys, Wales, formerly in the historic county of Montgomeryshire. It forms part of the community (and community council) of Forden with Leighton and Trelystan with the neighbouring settlements of Trelystan, Leighton and Kingswood.

Looking down on the parish is the Long Mountain, which stretches north eastwards from Forden through the border between Powys, Wales and Shropshire, England.

== History ==
Traces of a Roman road and of a Roman camp called locally "the Gaer" are near the River Severn, in a township of the parish called Thornbury.

In 1868, the National Gazetteer said of the parish

FORDEN, a parish in the hundred of Cawrse, county Montgomery, North Wales, 3 miles N. of Montgomery, and 4 S.E. of Welshpool, its post town. The Oswestry and Newtown railway has a station at each of these towns. Forden is situated on the eastern bank of the river Severn, near Offa's Dyke, and includes the townships of Hem, Kilkewyd, and several others. The Welsh suffered defeat here in the reign of Edward I. The living is a perpetual curacy in the diocese of Hereford, value £112, in the patronage of the Grocers' Company. The church is dedicated to St Michael. It contains monuments of the Devereux family. There are a few charities, producing about £4 per annum. There is a National school. The principal building in the parish is the House of Industry for the district of Montgomery and Pool. In the neighbourhood are remains of entrenched camps.

The parish church of St Michael and All Angels, about half a mile to the west of the road from Welshpool to Montgomery, was enlarged in 1830. For some three hundred years the church was the burial-place of the family of Devereux, whose estate at Nantcribba was within the parish. The marble font, oval in shape, was presented in 1794 by Richard Edmunds.

Between 1861 and 1965 the village was served by Forden railway station on the Cambrian Coast Line.

Captain Stephen Beattie VC (1908–1975), a Welsh recipient of the Victoria Cross was born at Leighton, Montgomeryshire.

== Governance ==
A rural district of Forden was created by the Local Government Act 1894 and survived until 1974. All significant local government services are now provided by the Powys County Council unitary authority. There is also a Forden with Leighton and Trelystan community council, which has a mostly consultative role.

Until 2022 Forden was the name of the electoral ward, coterminous with the Forden with Leighton and Trelystan community. The ward was represented on Powys County Council by one county councillor, who was an independent since 1995, with the exception of 2004-2008 when a Liberal Democrat candidate was adopted. Generally a single candidate stood, with no election necessary. Following a boundary review, in 2022 the Forden and Montgomery wards merged to become 'Forden and Montgomery'. Green Party candidate, Jeremy Thorp, won the seat at the 2022 Powys Council election.

For the purposes of the Senedd, Forden is part of the Montgomeryshire constituency and the Mid and West Wales electoral region. The parish forms part of the Montgomeryshire parliamentary constituency in the House of Commons of the UK Parliament.

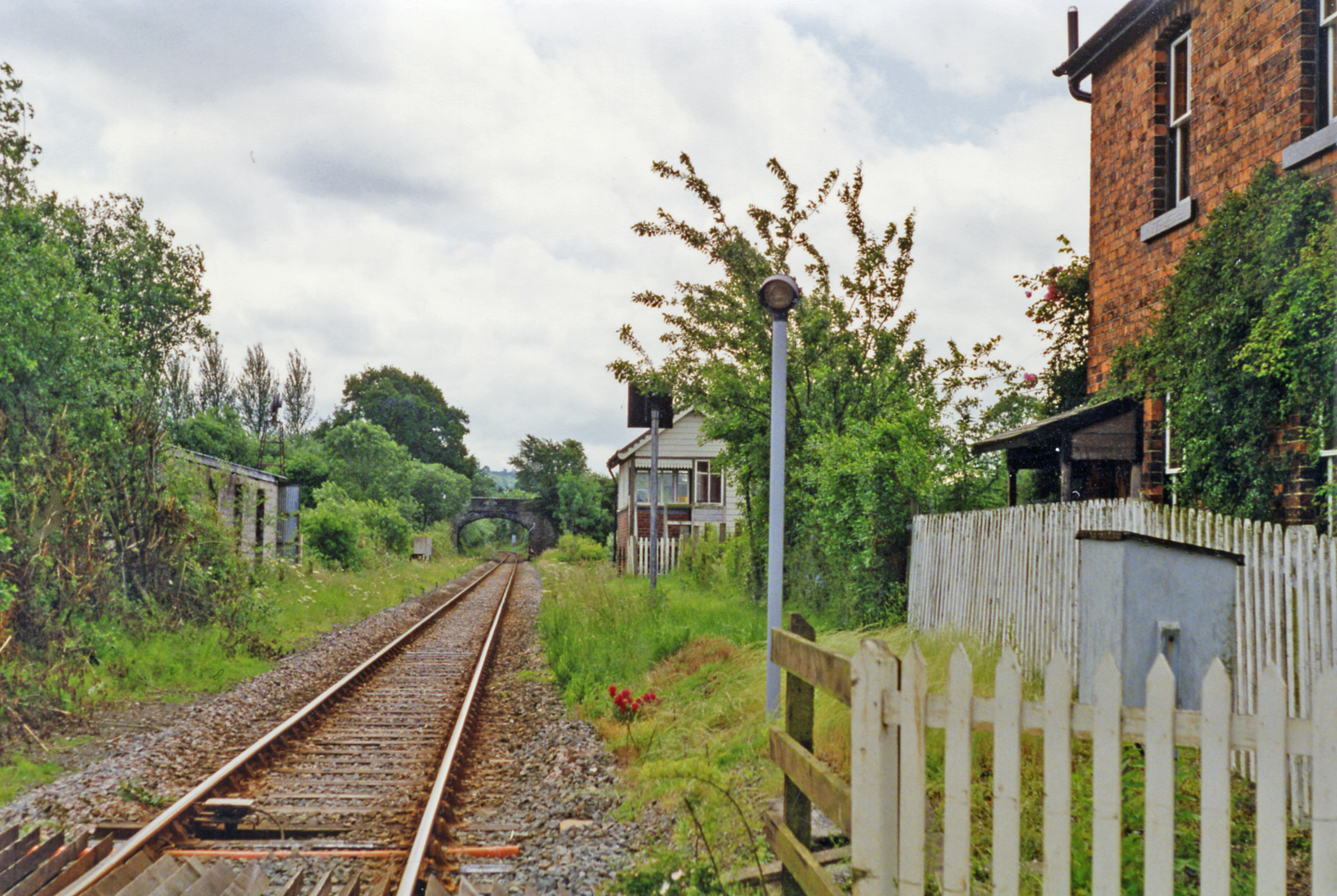
Remains of the station which closed in 1965

== Sport ==
The village is represented by Forden United who play at the community centre.
