= Llanllugan Abbey =

Former Cistercian abbey in Powys, Wales

Coordinates: 52.61064°N 3.39294°W

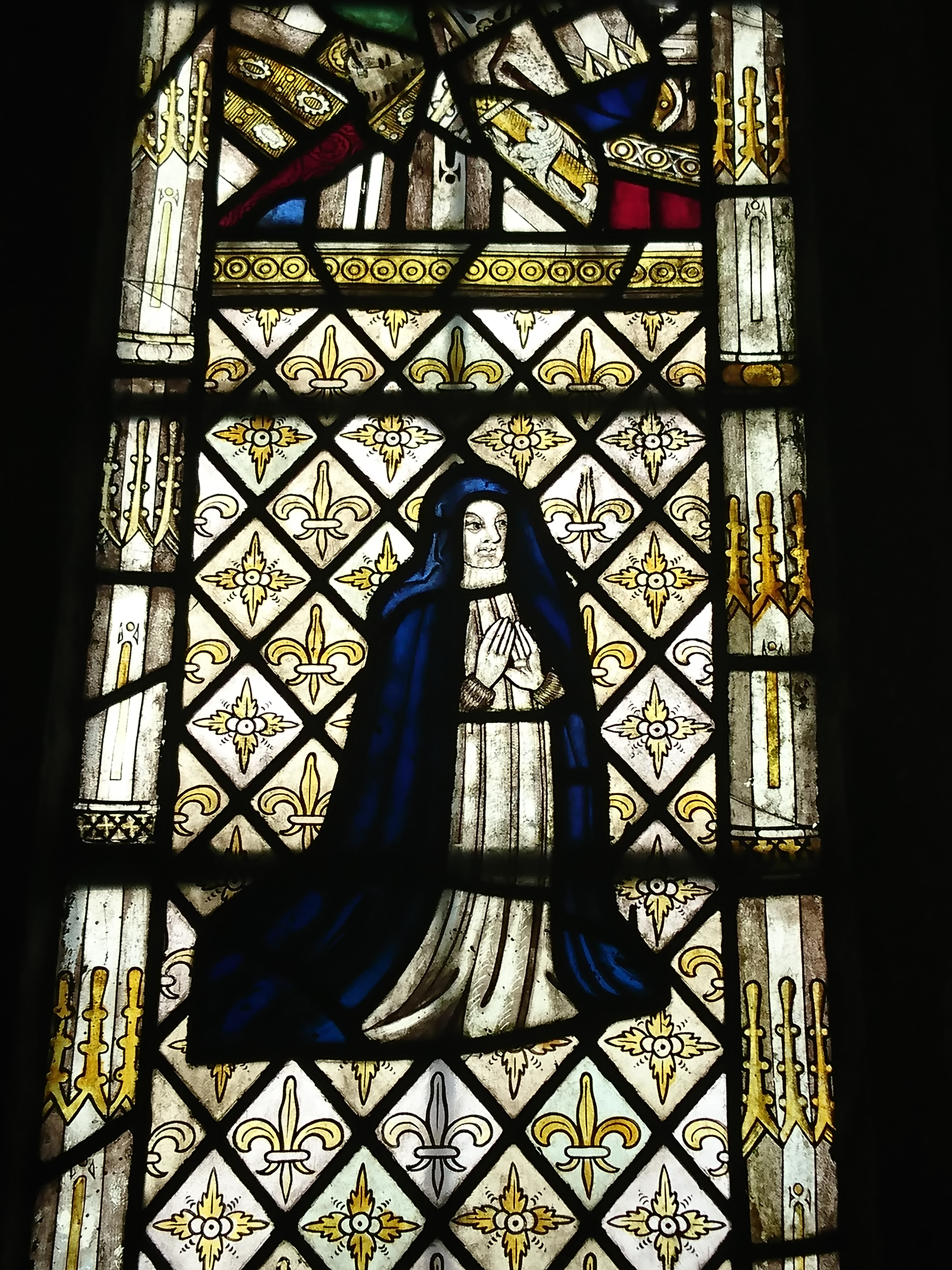
Stained glass window at Llanllugan church depicting a kneeling nun

Llanllugan Abbey was a monastery of Cistercian nuns located at Llanllugan, Powys, Wales. It was one of only two Cistercian women's monasteries in Wales.

Maredudd ap Rhobert, Lord of Cedewain, issued an early charter to Llanllugan nunnery probably in the early thirteenth century. The charter provided the nuns with their core estates in the township of Llanllugan between the two streams of the Rhiw. The abbey's other estates include Hydan grange in Castle Caereinion and Cowney in Llangadfan. Llanllugan also received income from appropriated churches: the rectory of Llanfair Caereinion was granted by Bishop Hugh of St Asaph in 1239 and Llanllwchairan by Bishop Anian of St Asaph in 1263. It was founded as a dependency of the Cistercian monks at the Abbey of Strata Marcella.

The Princes of Wales founded a number of Cistercian monasteries in that period, which were independent of the ones founded in Norman England. As a result, these houses were nominally allied with the native Welsh nobility.

The abbey is famous in Welsh literature from a poem by the leading poet Dafydd ap Gwilym entitled Cyrchu Lleian (English: Wooing a nun). In the poem, Dafydd implores his anonymous messenger to travel to "proud Llanllugan" and entice one of the nuns from the convent to the forest grove. It has been suggested that the abbey was small: only four nuns and an abbess were recorded in 1377. Dafydd's poem (written before the Black Death) suggests there were some 60 nuns at that time; however, that figure should be taken as poetic license, as the two Welsh communities of Cistercian nuns rarely seem to have had more than a dozen members each.

The former monastery church survives as the parish church of Llanllugan. However, the site of the abbey buildings remains uncertain: they might have been in a meadow 200 metres to the south of the church.
