= Hoarstones =

Stone circle in Shropshire, England

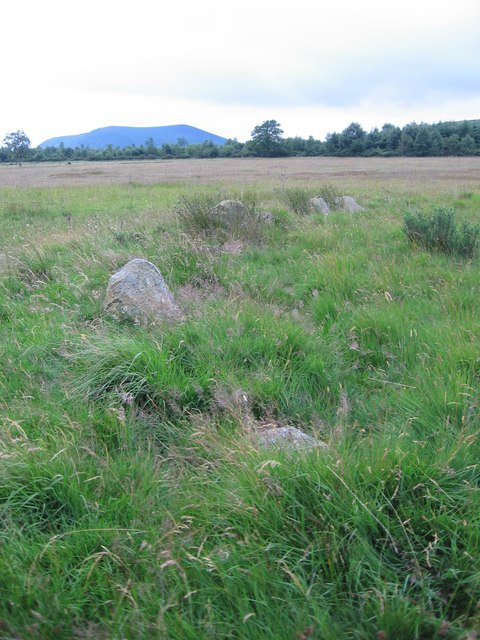
- The Hoarstones, with Corndon Hill in the background

- Location within Shropshire
- 52.592778°N 2.999167°W
- Type: Stone circle
- Periods: Bronze Age
- Location: Chirbury with Brompton

The Hoarstones, or Hoar Stone Circle, is a stone circle in the civil parish of Chirbury with Brompton in the English county of Shropshire. The Hoarstones are part of a tradition of stone circle construction that spread throughout much of Britain, Ireland, and Brittany during the Late Neolithic and Early Bronze Ages, over a period between 3300 and 900 BCE. The purpose of such monuments is unknown.

The Hoarstones are one of up to five stone circles known from this area, on the borders between Shropshire and Powys. Of these, only the Hoarstones and Mitchell's Fold survive. Shaped elliptically, the Hoarstones circle measures 23.3 by 21.1m in diameter. It contains between 38 and 40 small stones, identified as dolerites probably sourced locally. There is a central stone inside the circle, although whether this was part of its original prehistoric design is unclear. Several of the stones contain small holes, which according to 19th-century accounts were caused by miners drilling holes into them; gunpowder was then placed into these holes and lit to produce explosions.

The existence of the circle was noted by the antiquarian Reverend C. H. Hartshorne in 1838. An excavation took place in 1924, led by Lily F. Chitty.

== Location ==
The term "Hoar Stone" refers to a boundary mark and was recorded as the site's traditional name in the 1920s, with the site having been referred to as the "Hoar Stone Circle", as well as the "Hoarstones". Thinking this name inappropriate, the Reverend C. H. Hartshorne referred to it as Marsh Pool Circle. Other names for the stone circle include Black Marsh and Hemford.

The area on which the circle stands is called Black Marsh. The Hoarstones are located 7 miles north of Bishop's Castle, and 5 ½ miles north of Lydham. It is also one mile northwest of Shelve. The area on which it stands is moorland, at 300 m O.D. The circle is overlooked from the east by the Stiperstones, a quartzite ridge.

== Context ==
While the transition from the Early Neolithic to the Late Neolithic in the fourth and third millennia BCE saw much economic and technological continuity, there was a considerable change in the style of monuments erected, particularly in what is now southern and eastern England. By 3000 BCE, the long barrows, causewayed enclosures, and cursuses which had predominated in the Early Neolithic were no longer built, and had been replaced by circular monuments of various kinds. These include earthen henges, timber circles, and stone circles. Stone circles are found in most areas of Britain where stone is available, with the exception of the island's south-eastern corner. They are most densely concentrated in south-western Britain and on the north-eastern horn of Scotland, near Aberdeen. The tradition of their construction may have lasted for 2,400 years, from 3300 to 900 BCE, with the major phase of building taking place between 3000 and 1,300 BCE.

These stone circles typically show very little evidence of human visitation during the period immediately following their creation. This suggests that they were not sites used for rituals that left archaeologically visible evidence, but may have been deliberately left as "silent and empty monuments". The archaeologist Mike Parker Pearson suggests that in Neolithic Britain, stone was associated with the dead, and wood with the living. Other archaeologists have suggested that the stone might not represent ancestors, but rather other supernatural entities, such as deities.

The Hoarstones are one of two prehistoric stone circles known to survive in Shropshire, the other being Mitchell's Fold. These were among five probable stone circles that are historically recorded as being within two miles of each other, largely in Shropshire but also stretching in neighbouring Powys. Alongside the Hoarstones and Mitchell's Fold, the Whetstones was also a large circle; it was destroyed in 1870. A fourth stone circle, the Druid's Castle, as well as a fifth possible example, at Shelve, were smaller. Given the differences in size, the archaeologist Aubrey Burl suggested that the Druid's Castle was erected at a different time to the larger three rings. Of this group of stone circles, the Hoarstones were the most northerly.

== Description ==
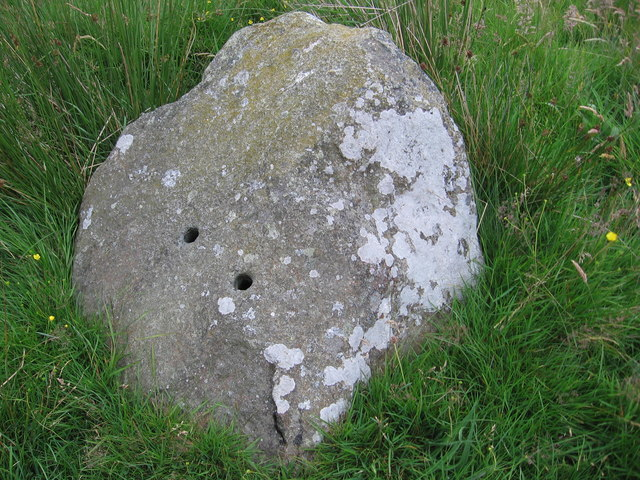
Two of the small holes evident in a stone within the circle, reportedly drilled by miners

The ground on which the circle stands is flat, and often boggy. The Hoarstones contains between 38 and 40 stones, arranged in an elliptical fashion. The ring measures between 23.3 by 21.1m in diameter, making it larger than average for the stone circle tradition. Burl noted that it was "irregularly graded" to the southeast. There is a gap between stones on the east side of the monument, which may have been originally intended as an entrance into the ring. Just south of the centre of the circle is a single stone, measuring around 1 metre (3 feet) high; it is unclear if this is an original prehistoric feature of the monument or a later addition. Unlike at some stone circles, there is no clear evidence of a ditch surrounding the stones.

The stones themselves are small. They are a type of local dolerite, which Burl suggested came from the nearby Stapeley Hill. The stones have been inserted into a bed of loam. Some of these stones are buried within the surrounding peat, and they are often concealed amid the grass growing around them. Chitty suggested that some of these stones might have been deliberately shaped and that the larger examples were supported with small pieces of sandstone packing their bases. There are small holes in some of the stones. According to an account recorded in 1893, these were caused during weddings held nearby, when miners drilled holes in the rocks and filled them with gunpowder to produce explosions.

Burl believed that the Hoarstones dated from the Early Bronze Age.

== History ==
=== Antiquarian and archaeological investigation ===
The Reverend C. H. Hartshorne visited the site in 1838, publishing the record of this in 1841. Around 1897, a Mr Jarrett ploughed up a perforated sandstone axe-head from the field immediately to the south of the circle, later donated to the Ashmolean Museum in Oxford.

In August 1924, Lily F. Chitty visited the stone circle to measure it for the Stone Monuments Committee of the British Association, noting that at that time the area around it was overgrown with gorse, heather, and marsh grass. On that visit, she was able to identify 33 stones in the circle. She returned in September with her father, the Reverend J. C. M. Chitty, at which point she was able to ascertain the location of three more stones. Assisted by Mr Roberts, the Chittys removed much of the foliage and opened a trench across the northeast part of the circle, revealing a previously concealed stone. This project resulted in the identification of 38 stones. Chitty took chippings of several stones and presented them to Dr H. H. Thomas of the Geological Museum in Jermyn Street, who identified it as being of the dolerite found in Stapeley Hill.

=== Folklore ===
In 1881 a widow surnamed Preece, who lived in Rorrington, reported that she knew of the stone circle as the "Fairesses Ring" and that six figures had been reported as having been seen dancing there. Writing in the 1920s, Lily F. Chitty commented that she suspected that this name and its associations had actually been applied to the Mitchell's Fold circle. Chitty also reported a tradition that the ring was called "the Roman Stones," supposing that the name had been transferred from the nearby Roman Gravels, and that "visitors" to the site whom she encountered had reported that the sacrament used to be administered from a hole in the stones.
