= Oliver Mathews =

Welsh apothecary and chronicler (c. 1520–1618)

Mathews' arms: ermine, a cross gules

Oliver Mathews (or Matthews; c. 1520–c. 1618) was a Welsh apothecary and chronicler. He wrote the first history of Shrewsbury, the county town of Shropshire, England, on the River Severn, although as Hugh Owen and John Brickdale Blakeway point out, it contains "strange and unauthorised assertions", and is not considered reliable.

== Life ==
According to his own writings, Mathews seems to have been born around 1520. (Note: Mathews wrote on 18 March 1615 that he was "aged 95 yeres". The parish registers of Chirbury do not extend far enough back to record if he was baptised there, and no records relating to him or his family were found in the registers of Chirbury, Bishop's Castle, Snead, Hyssington, or Cleobury Mortimer.) His father was Richard Mathews, a yeoman of Kinton near Chirbury, said by Richard Williams Morgan to have been from an "old and respectable family". Antiquary Richard Williams writes that they had "settled for many generations" near Caersws at Park farm, where he says Oliver Mathews appears to have been born. However, Edward Hamer, another antiquary, notes that if so they "appear to have occupied a subordinate position", because a branch of the Pryce family occupied the Park around that time. Enoch Salisbury instead asserts that Mathews was "neither a Salopian nor a Welshman as some have thought, but a native of Monmouthshire, and born, it is believed, not far from Pontypool". From his letters, Mathews seems to have considered himself Welsh, and of Celtic descent, referring to himself as a "Brittaine".

He moved to Shrewsbury, and on 19 April 1560 was admitted as a half-brother to the Mercers Company, which included an Apothecaries guild, to trade in "Poticarye and Grocerye". The amount he paid to join (thirty-six shillings and eight pence) indicates that his father was not a freeman of the company, and he had not served a seven-year apprenticeship to a freeman. On 30 September of the same year, he was admitted as a Burgess of Shrewsbury. He became a prosperous businessman, and in 1570/1571 is recorded as having owned land worth twenty shillings in the Welsh Ward of Shrewsbury. In 1571, Queen Elizabeth I gave the Manor of Arwystli to Robert Dudley, causing Mathews to complain of the "given awaie of the parkes of Caersouse from the burgesses to keep the King's breeding Mares." Mathews frequently served as warden of the Mercer's Company until 6 August 1572, when he paid to become a full brother and freeman, which was the last time he appears in their records. He seems to have continued to live in Shrewsbury, and traded as an apothecary there, until at least 1576, before retiring to Bishop's Castle.

On 7 January 1577, he married Jane Broughton, daughter of Edward Broughton of the Broughton family, at Bishop's Castle. He obtained a lease from the Crown from 22 June 1580 for six acres of land and all tithes of grain from the town and fields of Cleobury Mortimer for twenty-one years; these had been possessions of the dissolved Wigmore Priory, employed for the maintenance of a sexton for the parish church. Mathews is recorded as living at Bishop's Castle from at least 1599 to 1611, including during the later heraldic visitation of Shropshire, though his letter from 1615 indicates that he lived at the nearby village of Snead. He and his wife had a daughter, Jane, and two sons, Thomas, and Edward. His daughter Jane married Shrewsbury goldsmith Thomas Gittins on 11 December 1599, and had at least three children by 1615: Thomas, Symon, and Elizabeth. Mathews' son Thomas, a mercer, was admitted to the Mercers Company on 4 October 1608, and had three sons: Thomas (bapt. 1616), Oliver (bapt. 1617), and Edward (bapt. 1618), all christened at St Chad's Church, Shrewsbury. (Note: Thomas' sons Edward and Thomas were both drapers in Shrewsbury, as was the younger Thomas' son, who was also called Thomas. The elder Thomas' son Oliver was buried on 10 June 1658 at St Chad's Church.) One source, William Allport Leighton, reports that Mathews married again on 30 November 1602 at Church Stoke, but the name of this second wife is not legible in the parish records. In any case, "Jane, wife of Oliver Mathews, gent" was buried on 9 January 1611 at Bishop's Castle, with most sources assuming this to be his first wife, Jane née Broughton.

Although his date of death is not known, Mathews had died by 2 April 1618, when his will (which had been made on 20 June 1615) was proved. Morgan states that Mathews' family held Park farm near Caersws for many generations, until the early nineteenth century, and Hamer reported in 1869 that "several living persons remember the Matthews family residing at the Park", with one old man of that name still living in the area who claimed to be a descendant of Oliver Mathews. Salisbury reported that some of Mathews' descendants lived in Herefordshire as well as Shropshire, though none in Monmouthshire. His family's connection to Cleobury Mortimer may also have persisted, with the names Matthews and Oliver continuing there for several generations.

== Works ==
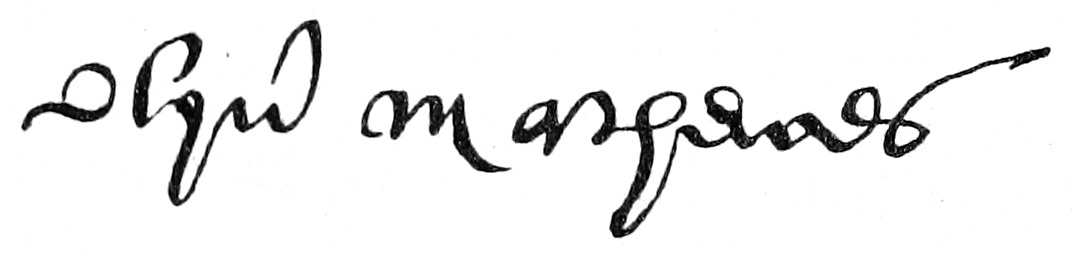
Mathews' signature (1616)

Four works by Mathews are known, consisting of one letter with historical notes, two blackletter chronicles, and a final piece appended to the first chronicle:

- "A Coppie of Oliver Mathewes Letter, sent to his 2 lovinge frends of the Cittie of Bristowe" (18 March 1615)
- "An Abreviation of divers most true and auncient Brutaine Cronicles, briefelie expressing the foundation of the most famous derayed Cittie Caer Souse or Dinas Southwen, most auncient in Brutaine, (Troy Newyth onlie excepted) and of some other famous Citties in Greate Brutaine" (May 1616)
- "The Cause of the Brittaines Captivitie" (appended to "An Abreviation...")
- "The Scituacion, Foundation, and auncient Names of the famous Towne of Sallop, not inferiour to manie Citties in this Realme, for Antiquitie, godlie Goverment, good Orders and Wealth" (July 1616)

These manuscripts have been published a number of times. A 1693 letter from David Evans of the Ashmolean Museum to Humphrey Foulkes summarises Mathews' history of Caersws, and mentions his histories of Shrewsbury and Bristol. Evans had direct access to Mathews' manuscripts, and the spellings of names that he gives differ from Hearne's later transcription. This letter was collected with the correspondence of Edward Lhuyd, and published by Rupert Morris in 1911. Shrewsbury publisher Stafford Price sent the manuscripts to John Thorpe, who communicated them to Thomas Hearne; Hearne transcribed them as an appendix to his History and Antiquities of Glastonbury (1722). In 1877, Shrewsbury publisher T. W. Bickley reprinted Hearne's 1722 transcription of all these manuscripts under the title The Scituation, Foundation, and Auncient Names of the Famous Towne of Sallop (the title of the most notable manuscript).

Assessing his work in their History of Shrewsbury (1825), topographers Hugh Owen and John Brickdale Blakeway described it as containing "strange and unauthorised assertions", but noted that Mathews' statement that he was ninety-five years old when writing it "disarms all criticism", and ultimately write that he "amused his age" by penning it. Richard Williams called his works "quaint and curious compositions", while editor William Valentine Lloyd described him as a "quaint chronicler", saying that his age "is in some measure an excuse for the fanciful exposition of early British history" that he wrote.

By 1867, the location of the manuscripts was no longer known.
