= Whetstones (stone circle) =

Lost ancient monument in Powys, Wales

- Location within Powys
- 52.57108°N 3.02803°W
- Type: Stone circle
- Periods: Neolithic / Bronze Age
- Location: Corndon Hill

The Whetstones are, or were, a stone circle beneath Corndon Hill in the parish of Church Stoke, Montgomeryshire, Wales, near the border with Shropshire, England. They lie immediately to the west of the village of White Grit and close to Priestweston. The site is also a short distance from the better-known Hoarstones and Mitchell's Fold circles.

== Context ==
While the transition from the Early Neolithic to the Late Neolithic in the fourth and third millennia BCE saw much economic and technological continuity, there was a considerable change in the style of monuments erected, particularly in what is now southern and eastern England. By 3000 BCE, the long barrows, causewayed enclosures, and cursuses which had predominated in the Early Neolithic were no longer built, and had been replaced by circular monuments of various kinds. These include earthen henges, timber circles, and stone circles. Stone circles are found in most areas of Britain where stone is available, with the exception of the island's south-eastern corner. They are most densely concentrated in south-western Britain and on the north-eastern horn of Scotland, near Aberdeen. The tradition of their construction may have lasted for 2,400 years, from 3300 to 900 BCE, with the major phase of building taking place between 3000 and 1,300 BCE.

These stone circles typically show very little evidence of human visitation during the period immediately following their creation. This suggests that they were not sites used for rituals that left archaeologically visible evidence, but may have been deliberately left as "silent and empty monuments". The archaeologist Mike Parker Pearson suggests that in Neolithic Britain, stone was associated with the dead, and wood with the living. Other archaeologists have suggested that the stone might not represent ancestors, but rather other supernatural entities, such as deities.

These Whestones were among five probable stone circles that are historically recorded as being within two miles of each other, largely in Shropshire but also stretching in neighbouring Powys. Alongside the Whetstones are the Hoarstones and Mitchell's Fold, both of which still survive and which are comparatively large. A fourth stone circle, the Druid's Castle, as well as a fifth possible example, at Shelve, were smaller. Given the differences in size, the archaeologist Aubrey Burl suggested that the Druid's Castle was erected at a different time to the larger three rings.

== Description ==
Burl estimated that Whetstones circle had had a major axis of 30 metres, in which case it would have been a large stone circle. Three stones were reported as being extant in 1841, the largest being 1.2 metres long. No information on the shape of the circle survives.

== History ==
The Reverend C. H. Hartshorne visited the site in 1841, commenting that three stones then remained, all leaning. He referred to these as being "mutilated fragments" of the ring's original appearance. He described the stones as "leaning, owing to the soft and boggy nature of the soil. They stand equidistant and assume a circular position [...] The highest of these is four feet above the surface; one foot six inches in thickness, and three feet in width." In 1860, the antiquarian Robert William Eyton still referred to the Whetstones as a "remarkable monument", but they were later stated to have been dug up, and the stones incorporated into a boundary wall, in about 1870.

Most of the stones in the circle were destroyed around 1860. The entire circle was then demolished in 1870. Aubrey Burl notes that "nearly all of its stones were blown up in the 1860s [...] when the last stone was uprooted around 1870 charcoal and bones were seen".

The remnants of the circle can still be observed from an adjacent field boundary, or from the northern summit of Corndon Hill. Large stones are also visible now forming a boundary next to a footpath, which were probably also once incorporated in the circle.
