= Huw Morus =

Welsh poet

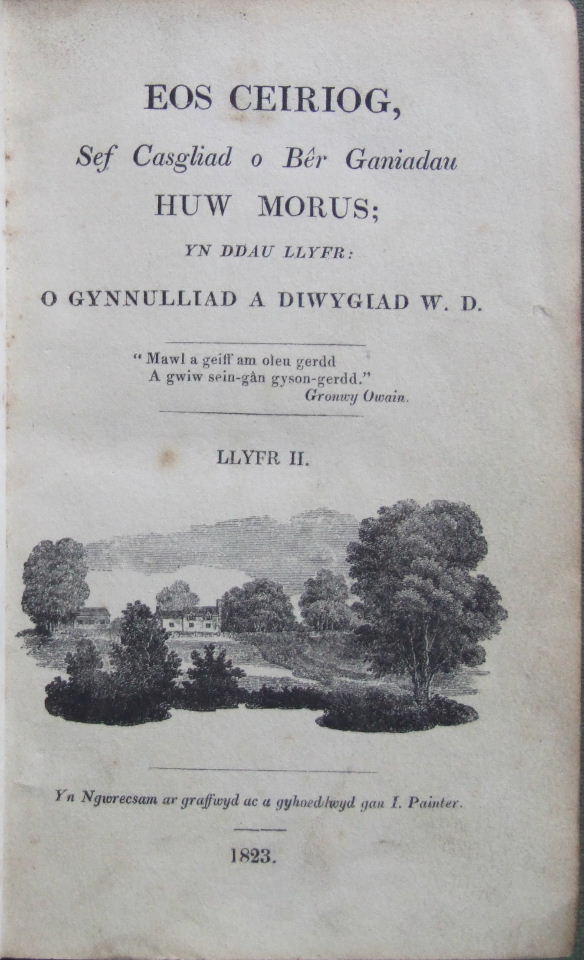
The title-page of Eos Ceiriog, Volume II (1823), a collection of Huw Morus's poetry published by Gwallter Mechain.

Huw Morus or Morys (1622 – 31 August 1709), also known by his bardic name Eos Ceiriog ('the nightingale of Ceiriog'), was a Welsh poet. One of the most popular and prolific poets of his time, he composed a large number of poems in a variety of metres. Morus's work bridges the gap between the strict-metre tradition of Beirdd yr Uchelwyr (the medieval 'Poets of the Nobility') and popular verse.

== Life ==
Huw Morus was born in 1622 and was the son of Morys ap Siôn ab Ednyfed. The family lived at the 14th-century farm of Pont y Meibion in the parish of Llansilin near Glyn Ceiriog. In appearance he was tall, sallow, and marked by smallpox.

Being a younger (the third) son, he was apprenticed to a tanner, but he did not complete his term of apprenticeship. He lived at Pont y Meibion, helping on the farm his father, his eldest brother, and his nephew in succession, and gradually winning a great reputation as a composer of ballads, carols, and occasional verse.

He was a devout Protestant, and the trial of the seven bishops, of whom William Lloyd of St Asaph had expressed admiration of his poetry, forced him to transfer his allegiance from James II to William of Orange, whose cause he warmly supported from 1688 onwards.

In his old age Huw Morus was revered by the countryside as a kind of oracle, and tradition says that in the customary procession out of Llansilin parish church after service the first place was always yielded to him by the vicar. He died unmarried on 31 August 1709, and was buried at Llansilin, where a slab to his memory bears englynion by the Reverend Robert Wynne of Gwyddelwern.

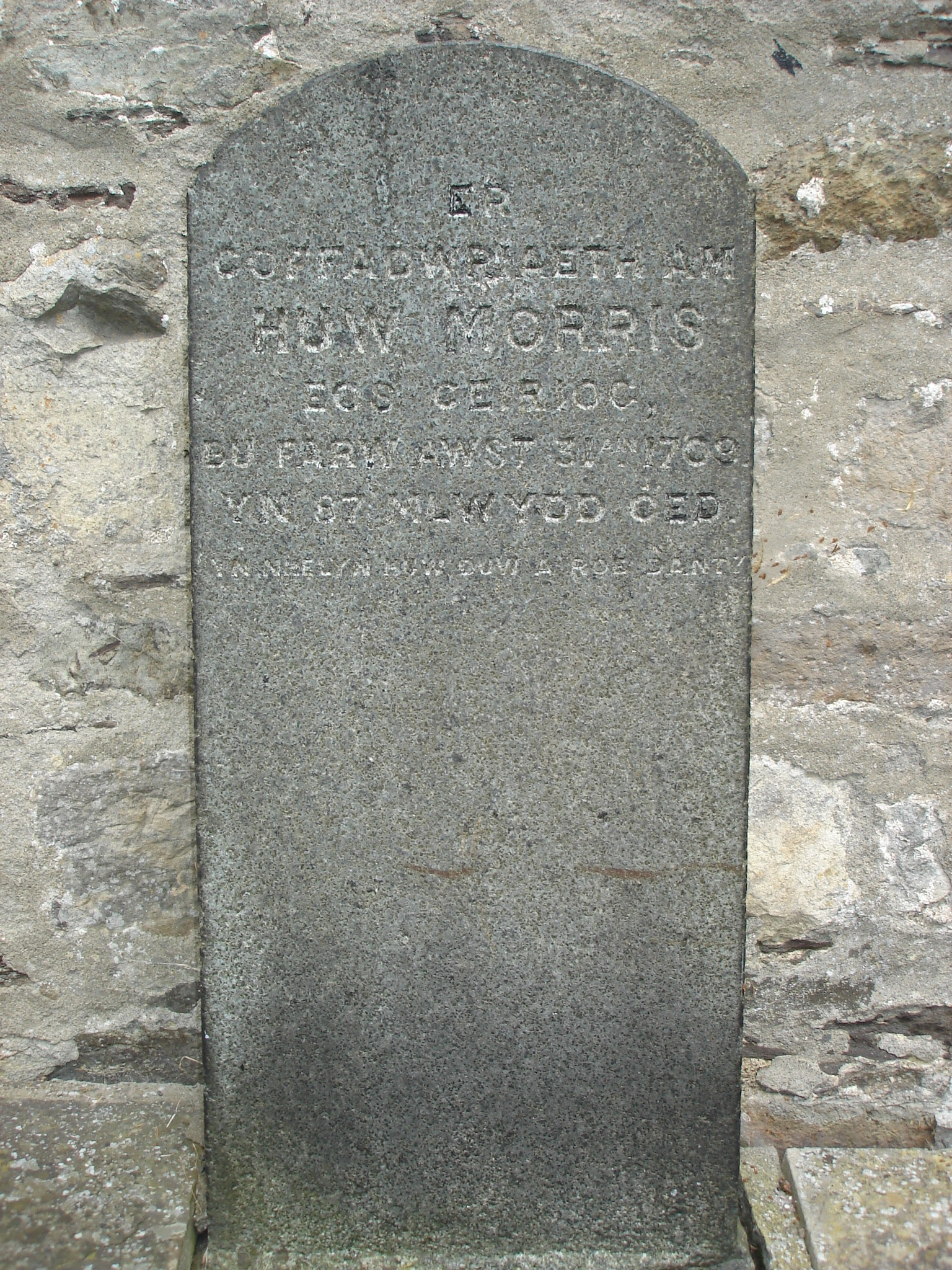
Huw Morus's gravestone at St Silin's Church, Llansilin

== Work ==
Morus wrote much in strict metres, but is better known as a writer in the free ballad metres of the English type, which became popular in Wales with the decline of the older poetry in the seventeenth century.

Next to his love poems, the most familiar ones treat political subjects. Huw Morus, like most of his countrymen, was a staunch Royalist and supporter of the Church of England. He satirised freely the Roundhead preachers and soldiers, sometimes in allegory, and sometimes without any disguise. In 1660 he wrote an ironical "Elegy upon Oliver's Men", and a "Welcome to General Monk". Under Charles II he was still attached to the same interest, and vigorously denounced the Rye House Plot in 1683.

== Legacy ==
Poems by Huw Morus appear in the collection of songs printed for Foulk Owens in 1686, and reprinted (as Carolau a Dyriau Duwiol) in 1696 and 1729.

An outdoor stone seat called Cadair Huw Morus ('Huw Morus's chair'), with the initials H. M. B. (Huw Morus, Bardd) upon the back, survived into the 19th century near Pont y Meibion. It was fixed into a wall, and forms the subject of an engraving prefixed to the 1823 edition of the poet's works. In 1909 a memorial was erected at the same 14th-century farm.
