= Hyssington =

Village in the county of Powys, Wales

Coordinates: 52.544315°N 3.012613°W

Hyssington: Welsh: Isatyn
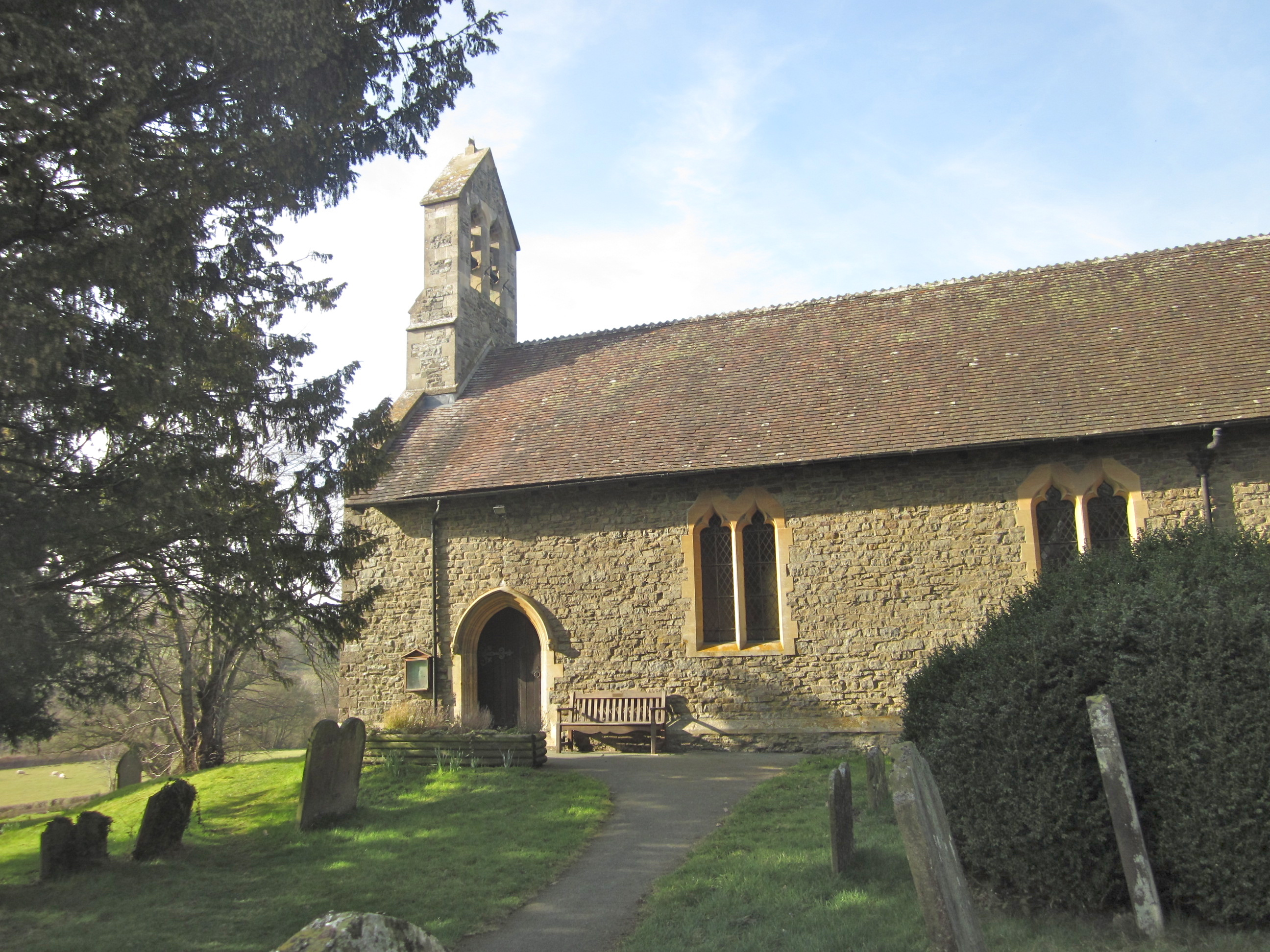
- Hyssington Church, Montgomeryshire

- Location within Powys
- OS grid reference: SO 313945
- Community: Churchstoke
- Principal area: Powys
- Preserved county: Powys
- Country: Wales
- Sovereign state: United Kingdom
- Post town: Montgomery
- Postcode district: SY15
- Police: Dyfed-Powys
- Fire: Mid and West Wales
- Ambulance: Welsh
- UK Parliament: Montgomeryshire and Glyndŵr
- Senedd Cymru – Welsh Parliament: Montgomeryshire

Hyssington (Welsh: Isatyn) is a parish in the South-Eastern corner of the historic county of Montgomeryshire in Wales and borders the county of Shropshire in England. It is now within the area of the Church Stoke community council in Powys. It is dominated by Corndon Hill. The church which is in the Diocese of Hereford lies just the north of a small village and is sited just to the west of a medieval Motte-and-bailey castle. This area was also the source of late Neolithic and Early Bronze Age battle-axes and axe-hammers, made from picrite that were widely traded around 2000 BC.

== Administration ==
The two townships of Hyssington and Mucklewick, which formed the ecclesiastical parish of Hyssington, straddled the Montgomeryshire/Shropshire border. In 1884 Mucklewick became part of the parish of Shelve in Shropshire while Hyssington remained in Montgomeryshire. After the creation of the county of Montgomeryshire in 1541, Hyssington was in Halcetor hundred.

Hyssington is in the modern Churchstoke community and three of the twelve members of Churchstoke Community Council are elected from the Hyssington ward.

== Landscape and geography ==
=== Quarrying ===
The Corndon flagstone quarries are on the south western slopes of Corndon Hill and date from Medieval times. From the air the quarries are still a prominent feature in the landscape. In this area the altered Hope Shales of the Ordovician period on the margin of the dolerite produce finely laminated flagstones which were widely used on building on the Shropshire-Montgomeryshire border. Only a few buildings still have the flagstones as roofing slates, including the Old Post Office at Churchstoke and the porch to Hurdley Farmhouse.

In the survey of Halcetor in 1609 a quarry of tile stone is mentioned in the said fforest of Corndon and that it should be let for 20 shillings a year.

== Archaeology ==
=== Stone Axe Factory (Group XII) ===
In 1951 Professor F W Shotton of Birmingham University identified the source of the rock used for shafthole battle-axes and axe-hammers as picrite which had been quarried from Corndon Hill. Production sites of stone axes and shafthole implements have been grouped by petrology and the Hyssington/Corndon Hill implements are known as Group XII. As the production of these implements in the Late Neolithic and Early Bronze Age did not employed the same flaking techniques as stone axes, which leave recognisable flaking debris, the site or sites of the Corndon Group XII implements production will be very much harder to identitify. However the Clwyd-Powys Archaeological Trust did excavate several small quarry depressions in 2008, but only found evidence of fairly recent disturbance. A stone slab with striations which was suggested was an example of Neolithic art, could equally well have been early plough marks

The main distribution of Group XII implements is in mid-Wales, the Midlands, the Cotswolds and stretching across to East Anglia. By 1988, 93 examples of these implements had been identified and all of these implements have shaftholes for hafting and there are no examples of picrite being used to produce axes.

== Hyssington Castle ==
On Castle Hill. Motte and bailey on a plateau on a small hill. Remains of a 13th-century tower (circa 9 metres / 30 feet square). Remains of a triangular bailey 70m x 45m. The base of a tower is possibly buried in northern corner of the bailey and in the east corner, traces of a hall remain. The site was visible in 1811, but above ground remains have now disappeared.

It has been suggested that this site may be the castle of Snead occupied by Simon de Parcio in 1231, and given by Henry III to William de Bowles in 1233.

== Buildings and architecture ==
=== Church of St Etheldreda ===
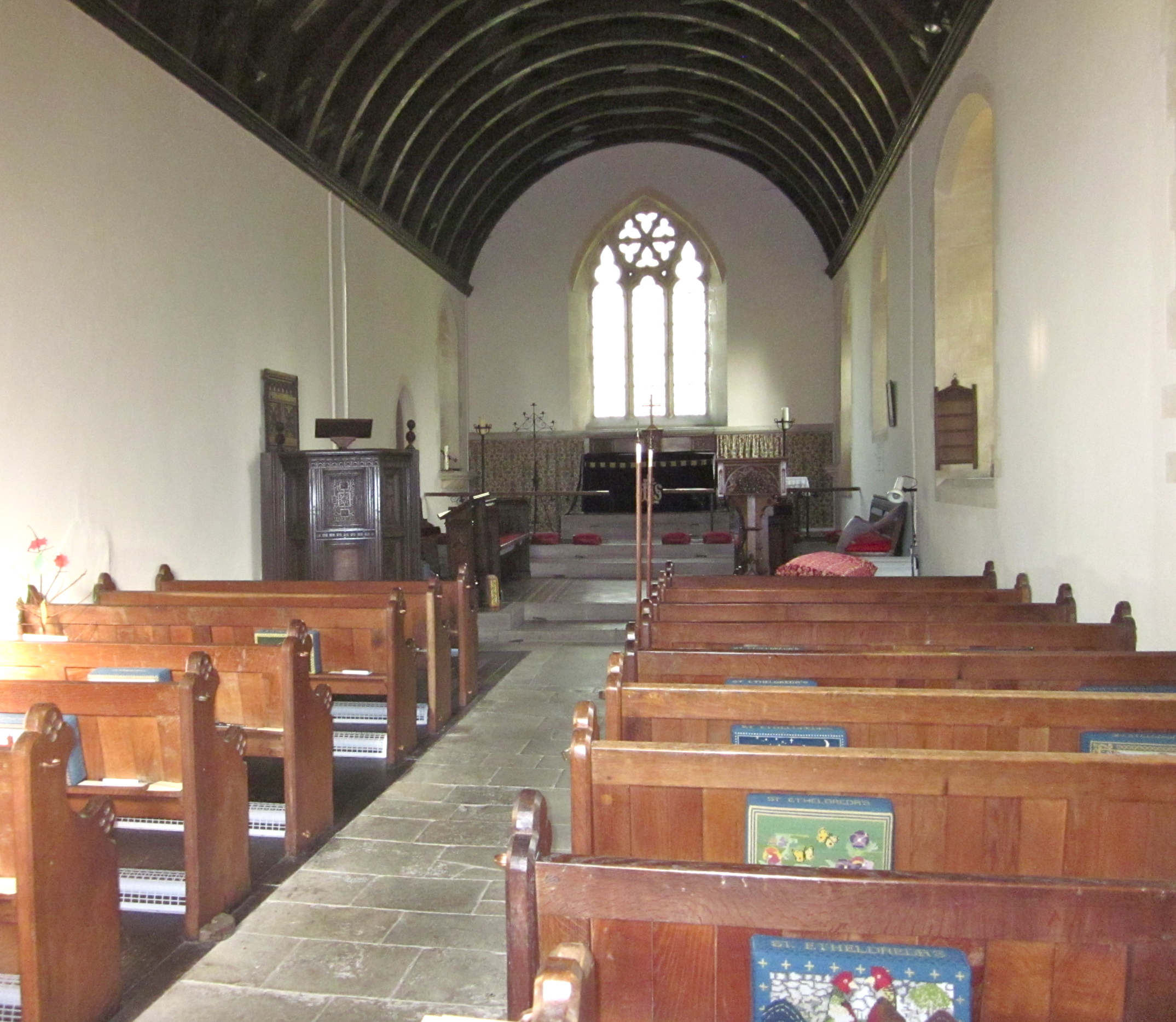
Hyssington Church, Montgomeryshire, Interior

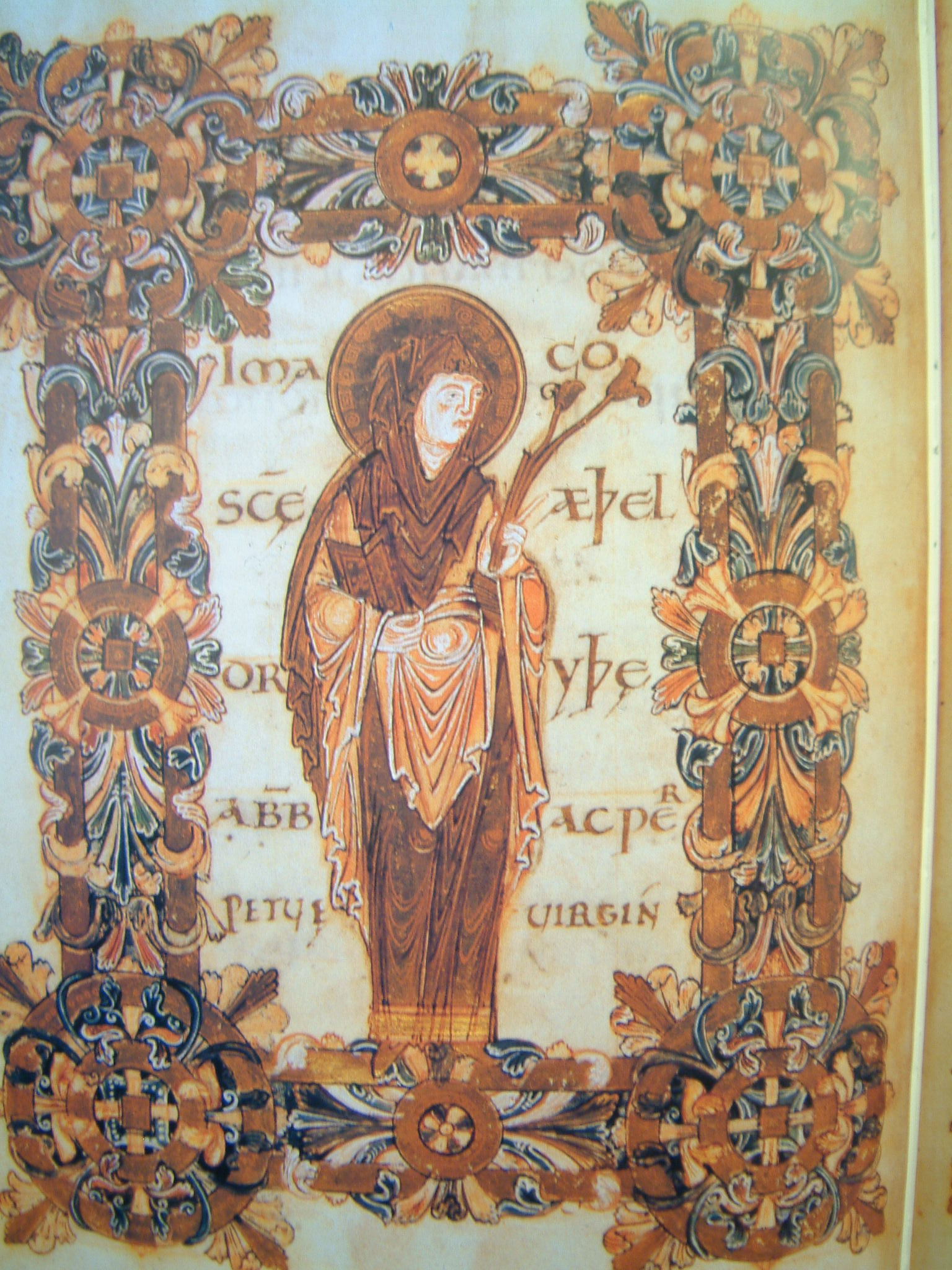
St-Aethelthryth from Benedictional of St. Æthelwold, 10 C British Library

The church is dedicated to the Saxon Saint Æthelthryth (or Æþelðryþe); about 636 – 23 June 679) is the name for the Anglo-Saxon saint known, particularly in a religious context, as Etheldreda or Audrey. She was an East Anglian princess, a Fenland and Northumbrian queen and Abbess of Ely. The existence of a Saxon church dedication that is likely to be 7th or 8th century in date and just to the east of Offa's Dyke, which runs through Churchstoke parish must be significant. The dedication should indicated an early Saxon or Mercian settlement and there is a possibility that an earlier Saxon hall or settlement lies under the adjacent Norman motte.

According to a local legend, the church has a miniature bull buried beneath the church step. It is said that the bull terrorised the neighbourhood until it was exorcised by twelve priests.

The building is a long single-chambered church with a west bell hanging, rebuilt in 1875 by Thomas Nicholson, the Hereford Diocesan architect. Plain plastered interior with scissor-rafter roof, and wagon roof in the chancel. The font is late medieval, octagonal and quite large. There is a good early 17th century pulpit with intricately carved panels. St. Etheldreda's church has an almost rectangular sloping churchyard, with views over the Shropshire hills. This churchyard contains the Commonwealth war graves of four British Army soldiers, three from World War I and one from World War II.

Although physically in Wales, the church at Hyssington is within the Church of England Diocese of Hereford. When the Welsh Church Act 1914 had been passed to disestablish the Church in Wales, Hyssington with Snead parish straddled the England-Wales border. The Welsh Church Commissioners therefore carried out a ballot of parishioners in 1915 to decide whether the parish of Hyssington with Snead should remain part of the Church of England, or form part of the Church in Wales. The parishioners in Hyssington with Snead voted by 108 to 33 to remain part of the Church of England.

=== Mission Church, White Grit ===
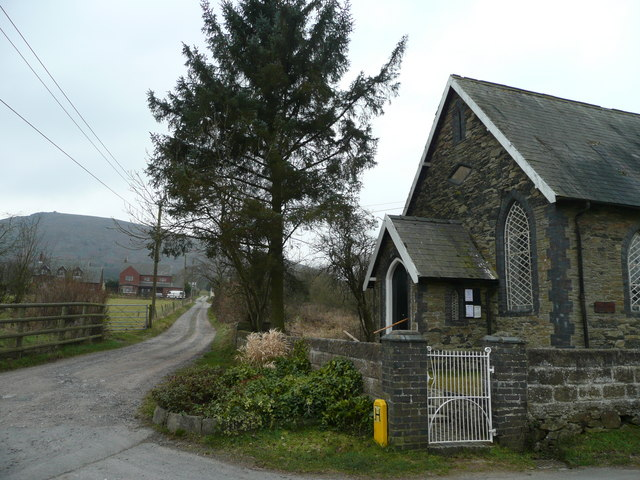
Chapel at White Grit

So-named after the White Grit lead mines. This is to the north-east of the village and was built to serve the mining community which was just over the border in Shropshire. The Mission Church is a corrugated iron tabernacle of the later 19th century. It has an apsidal east end, with Gothic windows and a corrugated iron bellcote. The matchboarded interior with its fittings survives.

=== Methodist Chapel ===
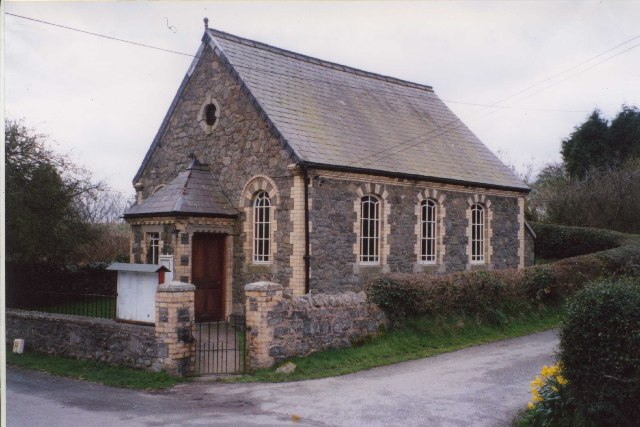
Primitive Methodist Chapel

Built 1889. In the village South of the church. Small, stone-built with some brick detail.

=== Houses in Hyssington ===
- Brynawel is a nicely preserved three-bay house of the later C18; three colour-washed bays with iron casements.
- Hyssington Farm is an early 17th-century timber-framed house with a lobby entry and stellar chimney stack. Three bays, the cross wing with good exposed close-studding. C18 rubble extension to the right.
- Cefn, One mile north of the village. Small square-framed house of c.1700. Three-bay front with central entrance, and end chimneys
- Great Brithdir, ¾ mile north west. Dated 1695. The stone-built house sits on a masonry platform. Lobby-entry L-plan

== Notable residents ==
In 1973 Ronnie Lane, bass guitarist with rock band the Faces, moved to Fishpool Farm in the village. Beginning to feel the effects of multiple sclerosis, however, he moved back to London in the late 70s.

== Literature ==
- Virginia Blanton (2007) Signs of Devotion: the cult of St Aethelthryth in medieval England, 695-1615. University Park, Pa: Pennsylvania State University Press ISBN 0-271-02984-6
- Clough T H and Cummins W A, (1988), Stone Axe Studies Vol. 2, The petrology of prehistoric stone implements from the British Isles, CBA Research Report No.67.
- Lewis E A (1915), A Survey of the Lordship of Halcetor Co Montgomery dated 30th June 1609 Collections historical & archaeological relating to Montgomeryshire. Vol. 37, pp31–43.
- Price, Marilyn A. Monumental inscriptions in the parish churchyard of Hyssington, Montgomeryshire. Basingstoke : M. E. MacSorley, 1996. 22p
- Royal Commission on the Ancient and Historical Monuments of Wales, (1911), Inventory of the Ancient Monuments in Wales and Monmouth I - County of Montgomery.
- Scourfield R. and Haslam R. (2013), The Buildings of Wales: Powys; Montgomeryshire, Radnorshire and Breconshire, Yale University Press. pp 124–125.
- Smith P.(1988, 2nd ed.), Houses of the Welsh Countryside, H.M.S.O.
- Williams, J. B. (1910), A History of the Parish of Hyssington Collections historical & archaeological relating to Montgomeryshire. Vol 35 177–237.

== See also ==
- White Grit

== Hyssington gallery ==
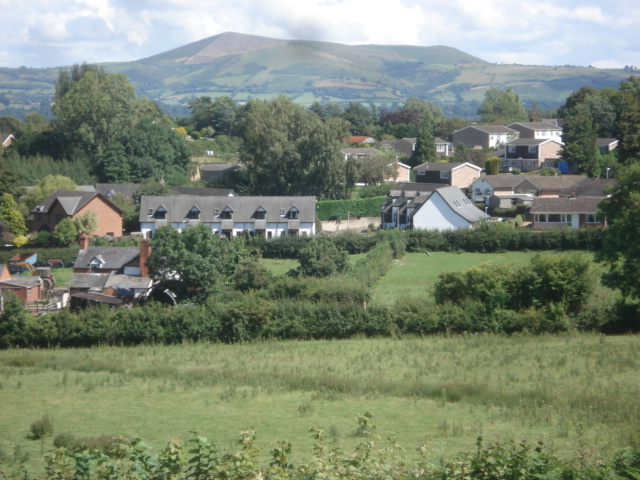
Looking towards Corndon Hill from Montgomery

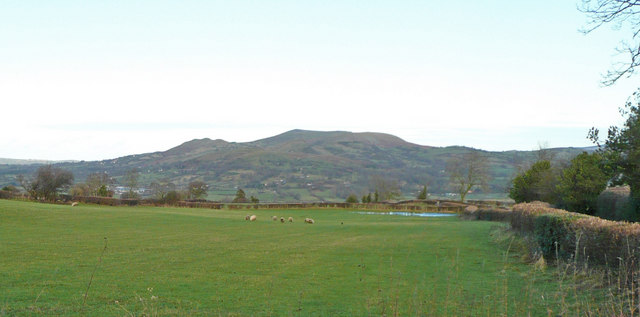
Outline of Corndon Hill

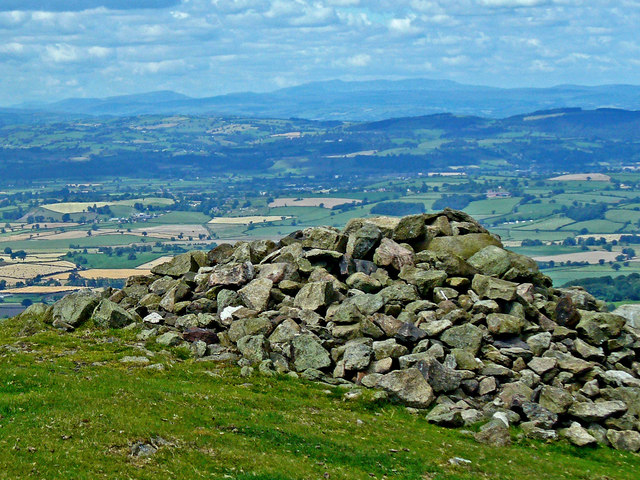
Cairn at summit of Corndon Hill looking over Montgomeryshire towards the Berwyns

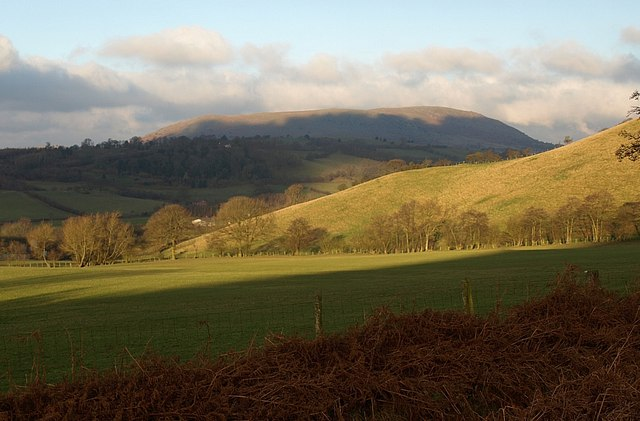
Slopes of Cefn Gunthly and Corndon Hill

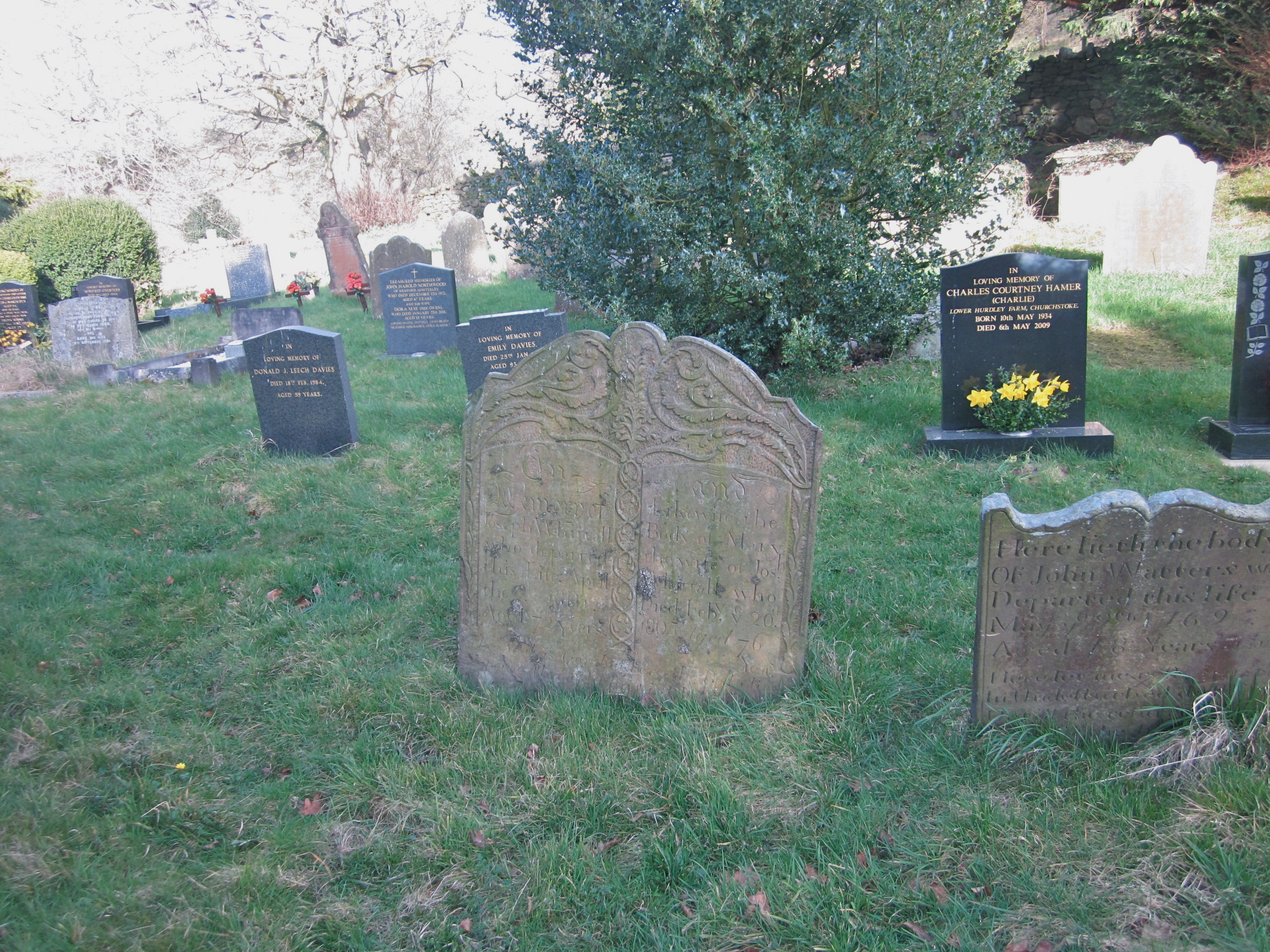
Hyssington Church, 18th century gravestones

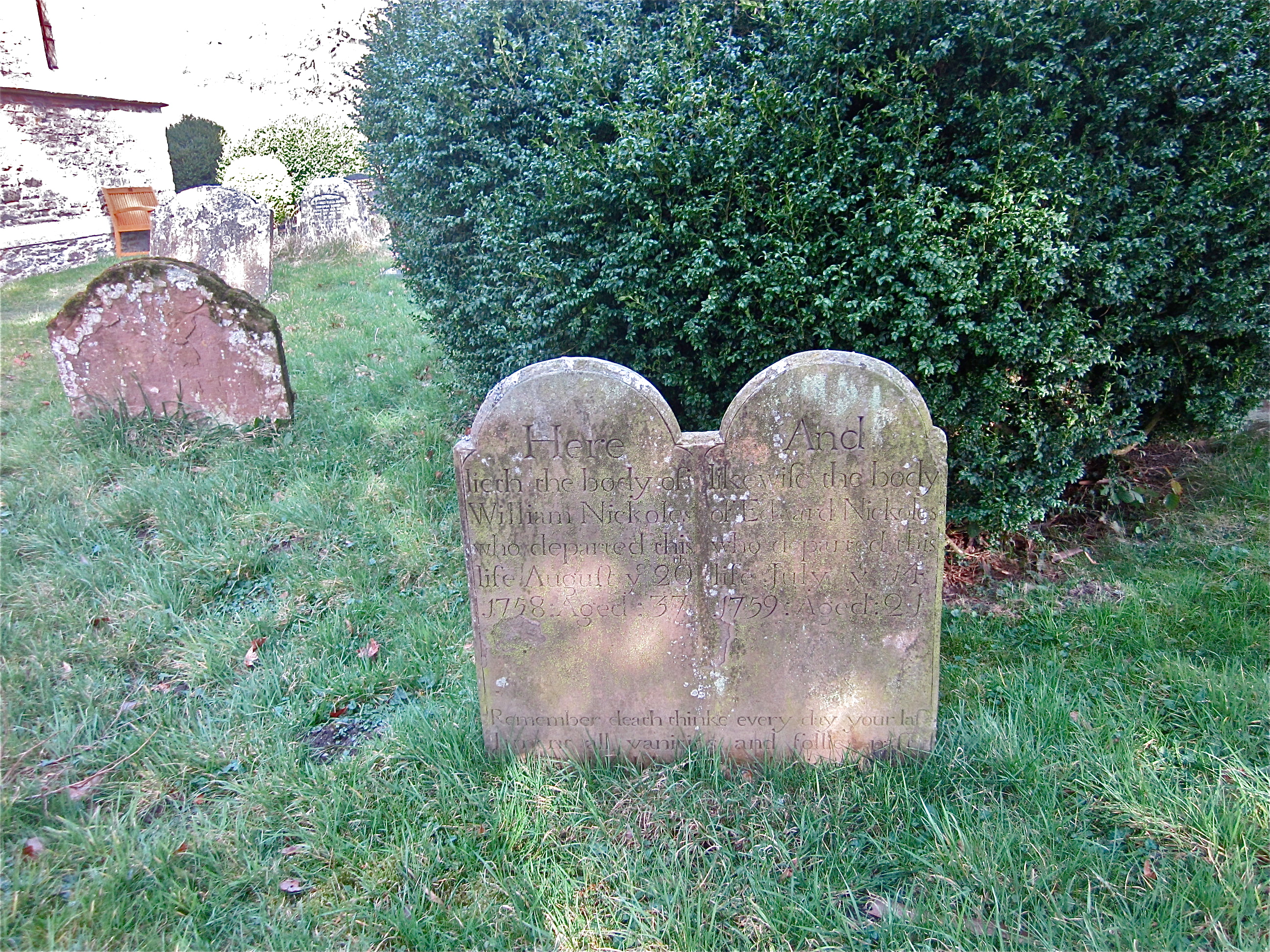
Hyssington Church, 18th century gravestone
