= Mitchell's Fold =

Stone circle in Shropshire, England

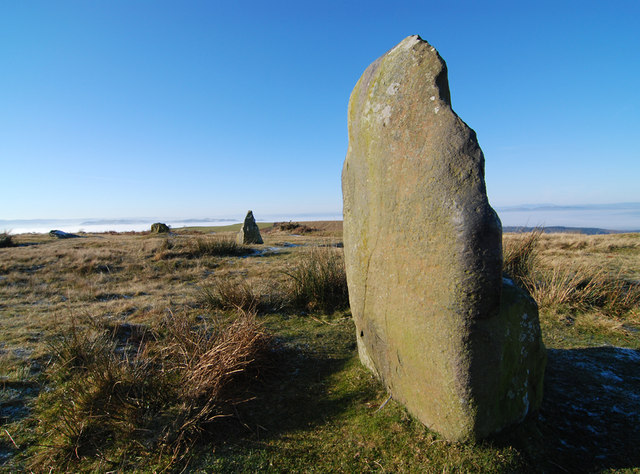
- Mitchell's Fold stone circle

- Location within Shropshire
- 52.5787°N 3.0282°W
- Type: Stone circle
- Periods: Bronze Age
- Location: Stapeley Hill

Mitchell's Fold (sometimes called Medgel's Fold or Madges Pinfold) is a Bronze Age stone circle in southwest Shropshire, located near the small village of White Grit on dry heathland at the southwest end of Stapeley Hill in the civil parish of Chirbury with Brompton, at a height of 353 metres (1,158 ft) AOD.

The stone circle, a standing stone, and a cairn comprise a Scheduled Ancient Monument; the circle is in the guardianship of English Heritage.

== Description ==
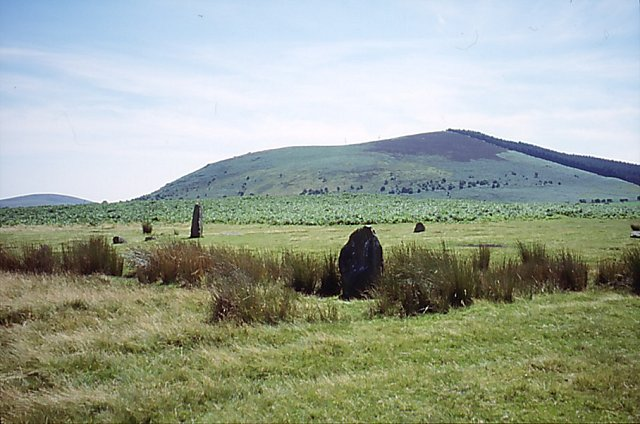
Corndon Hill above the Mitchells Fold stone circle

As with most sites of this type, its true history is unknown. The name of the circle may derive from 'micel' or 'mycel', Old English for 'big', referring to the size of this large circle.

Its doleritic stones came from nearby Stapeley Hill. Many of them are now missing and others are fallen. One example, reported in pagan magazine White Dragon, is that "This circle was the site of vandalism by a local farmer in the summer of 1995 when several stones were uprooted by a mechanical digger. The stones were promptly righted and "planted" again and the culprit punished. Ongoing unsympathetic use by both local youth and townie pagans, such as the creation of numerous fire pits and the leaving of litter and broken glass after the festivals, does nothing for the atmosphere of this site."

In the beginning there may have been some thirty stone pillars. The survivors that still stand range in height from 10 inches (250 mm) to 6 ft 3 in (1.91 m), and stand in an ellipse 89 ft (27 m) NW-SE by 82 ft (25 m) The tallest is at the south-east end of the major axis, standing, perhaps by coincidence or design, close to the line of the southern moonrise. This pillar and a companion have been taken to flank an entrance about 6 ft (1.8 m) wide.

Aubrey Burl has stated in his 2000 book A Guide to the Stone Circles of Britain, Ireland and Brittany that "There was a claim for a central stone and a very dubious eighteenth-century report that 'there was a stone across your two Portals, like those at Stonehenge, and that the stone at eighty yards distance was the altar.'" but that the "probability of a trilithon, otherwise unique to Stonehenge, at Mitchell's Fold, like an identical claim for Kerzerho in Brittany, should be regarded as rumour rather than reality."

== Folklore ==
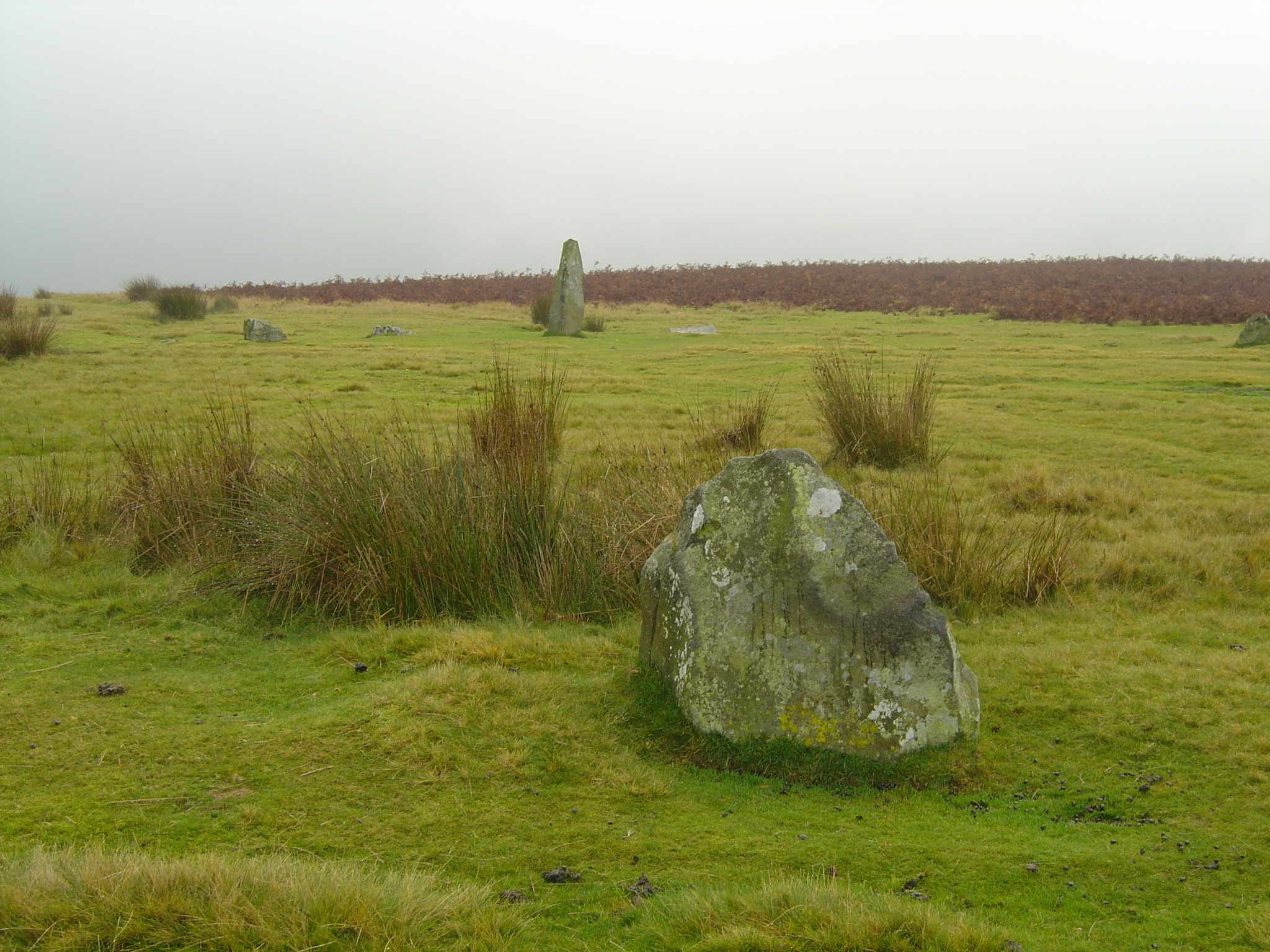
Mitchell's Fold stone circle, 30 October 2004

As with most sites of this type, its true history is unknown. However, there is a traditional folkstory that a giant whose marvellous cow gave unlimited amounts of milk used the circle until a malicious witch milked the cow, using a sieve until it was drained dry, as a result of which it fled to Warwickshire where it became the Dun cow. As a punishment, the witch was turned into stone and surrounded by other stones to prevent her escaping. What became of the giant is unknown.

Burl goes on to state that "An intriguing fact does exist however. Aerial photographs have revealed mediaeval ridge-and-furrow ploughmarks not only running up to the ring but also through it as though this 'prehistoric' megalithic ring might postdate the Middle Ages!"

== Other nearby prehistoric sites ==
The only other known stone circle in Shropshire is the Hoarstones, 1 1/2 miles (2.4 km) northeast of the Fold. Nearby, but just outside Shropshire, are the Whetstones, one-half mile (0.80 km) south of the Fold. So this is a concentrated area of activity. Nearly all the latter's stones were blown up in the 1860s; now there is only a collapse of stones. When the last stone was uprooted in 1870, charcoal and bones were seen in its hole.

The circle is 6 miles (10 km) north of Bishop's Castle, 1 mile (1.6 km) north of Corndon Hill over the Welsh border in the small village of White Grit, and within a few miles of the Late Neolithic / Early Bronze Age picrite stone axe factory of Cwm-Mawr. To the south-east is a weathered cubical block on a small cairn. Along the path leading from the Fold across Stapeley Common stand the Cow Stone (a single standing stone or Menhir) and the Stapeley Hill Ring Cairn .

== Popular culture ==
The standing stone circle is also a place players can visit in Assassin's Creed Valhalla, launched 2020. The game is set in 873 A.D. where it is referred to as Mycel Fold.

The circle features on the cover of the 2012 album 'Heathen Psalms' by Shropshire based pagan metal band Hrafnblóð.
