= White Grit =

Village in Powys, Wales

Coordinates: 52.570791°N 3.007459°W

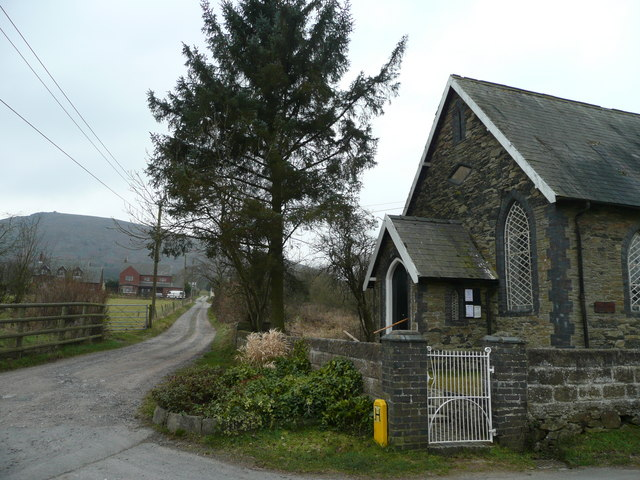
Former Methodist chapel at White Grit.

White Grit is a small, scattered village beneath Corndon Hill in Powys, Wales, directly on the border with (and partly in) Shropshire. The nearby village of Priest Weston, despite being in England, actually lies to the west of White Grit. To the east is the A488 road. The nearest town is Bishop's Castle.

White Grit lies in the community of Church Stoke (the small parts in Shropshire are in the civil parishes of Chirbury with Brompton and Worthen with Shelve). Adjoining is a hamlet called The Marsh. There is a stone-built Methodist chapel in White Grit, no longer used as a place of worship, and a corrugated-iron chapel, both of which are marked on Ordnance Survey maps.

== Etymology ==
A former mining village, it took its unusual name from the White Grit (or West Grit) Mine, lead having been mined intermittently in the area since mediaeval times. Its name is sometimes spelled "Gritt" with two letter "t"s.

== Whetstones ==
A stone circle known as the Whetstones was located to the west of the village, but it was largely destroyed in the 19th century.

== Mining at White Grit ==
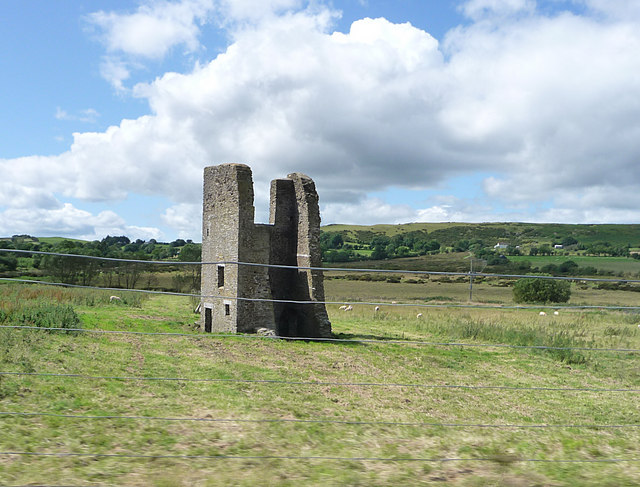
A former mine engine house near White Grit.

- Location - 1 mile south west of Shelve village (NGR SO326981)
- Minerals - Barytes, Calcite, Lead and Zinc
- Working Life - Known working life: Roman - 1935

=== History ===
This mine was originally worked as a single sett but it was split into two separate entities for a period, viz

- East Grit (also known as Old Grit)
- White Grit (also known as West Grit Mine).

Although a Roman pig of lead was found here in 1767, there is no other evidence of Roman working but references indicate that mining was being carried out in medieval times. Henry II laid down conditions governing the mining of lead in the Forest of Stiperstones and it is believed that the Grit Mine was working at this time. In 1181, Hugh Pantulf, High Sheriff of Shropshire accepted £55 from the King's lead mines at Shelve and Madoc ap Einion took out a five year lease on a Shelve lead mine at a cost of 40 marks. In 1182, a church in Amesbury, Gloucester paid 10 guineas for 34 loads of lead and had similar amounts again in 1184. Working since that time would have been intermittent and relatively shallow.

Engineering drawing of Boulton & Watt's White Gritt Engine, dated April 1783

In 1760, John Lawrence created the Whitegritt Mining Company with some partners and took on the lease of Grit and Ladywell Mines. On 18 January 1783, Lawrence contacted Boulton & Watt on behalf of the Company and asked for the approximate costs of erecting an engine at the mine to lift water 60 yards up 13" diameter pipes. He also asked for an estimate of the daily coal consumption for such an engine. The shaft was stated to be only 12 yards below adit level (22 yards total depth) and it was proposed to use the engine to sink 60 yards. James Watt replied that the engine could either be a 371/2" at a cost of about £1,100 or, if the pumps were smaller, a 30" at a cost of about £900. His letter gave details of coal consumption and the premium to be paid to the partnership for use of their invention, i.e.

- Coal consumption @ 10 strokes/min = 136 lbs/hour
- Consumption of a Newcomen steam engine to give the same duty being about 3 times as much = 408 lbs/hour
- Saving by difference = 272 lbs/hour
- Premium due to Boulton & Watt = 272/3 = 90 lbs/hour = (90 x 24 x 365)/2240 tons/year = 391 tons/year
- At the then price of coal premium = £90 per year.

In February, Mr Joshua Blakeway, another of the mine adventurers, wrote to James Watt to say that they had discussed the engine and were apprehensive about the length of the stroke. They did not think that 6 ft was adequate and thought that 8 ft would suit them better. Watt was asked to give his opinion on such an engine, which was to be similar in all respects to the 30" erected at Bog Mine shortly before. They expected "1/4 more execution" from the engine due to the longer stroke and stated that the engine would not be expected to exceed 120 gallons per minute at first, although this would be increased with depth. Coal for the boilers would be of the best and largest, coming from one of the neighbouring collieries. The mine at that time was coping with water by using 2 horses, 6 hours at a time, to work a horse gin. The water was drawn in a 72-gallon barrel, which usually "lacked only 5 or 6 gallons", but at the time of writing the horses were having difficulty in keeping up with the water.

The sale was eventually approved and a long legal agreement drawn up between the two parties. There was also a short agreement covering the annual premium, viz "27th March 1783 Memorandum that Joshua Blakeway Esquire, John Lawrence Miner and Thomas Lloyd Anwyl, Gentleman, on behalf of themselves and the rest of a Company called and known by the Name and Description of the Whitegritt Company and Messrs Watt and Boulton Engineers agree as follows:

The said Messrs Watt and Boulton grant a license to the said company to erect a steam engine at the Whitegrit Mine with a cylinder of 30" in diameter which will effectively and properly work a pump of 101/2" in diameter, eight foot stroke and eight strokes/minute, to raise the water 60 yards and to consume only 136 lbs of coal per hour. The said company paying them the said Messrs Watt and Boulton £90 per year and that if the said engine shall by any accident that may happen thereto stand and not be worked for one month or more at any time they the said Messrs Watt and Boulton shall and will make to the said company an allowance of the above-mentioned sum or premium of £90 per year proportional to such space of time exceeding 30 days as the said engine shall stand without working at each such time of stopping. And they the said engineers also agree to send a proper person to the said mines to assist in putting the said engine together, the said company paying such person £1 6s 0d per week whilst he is employed by the said company. And they the said Joshua Blakeway, John Lawrence and Thomas Lloyd Anwyl on behalf of themselves and the rest of the said company agree to pay to the said Messrs Watt and Boulton for the considerations and subject to the allowances aforesaid the said sum or premium of £90 per year and also to the beforementioned proper person apportion the said sum of £1 6s 0d per week. In witness whereof the said parties have here unto signed their names the Day and Year above written. Witness Signed ..........John Scrymster

Boulton & Watt contracted out the manufacture of the cylinder to Bersham Foundry and sent a man named Law to supervise the erection of the engine. The job did not go smoothly, however, due to delays in delivery of essential parts and Lawrence complained about the financial loss to the company. On April 10, however, Lawrence wrote to Watt to inform him "that evening at about four o'clock we put the engine to work and mean to continue working it for some time". The former hoped that this would be for at least 3 months. In December, a further letter confirmed that the engine "goes very prosperously being steam and air tight but that the boiler is very bad". Watt was asked for his advice on a new boiler, it being proposed to use a round one, similar to the original, but with a tube through it.

In June 1785, Grit Mine was said to be worked out and so the engine was stopped. By the end of the year, the company offered to sell the engine to a mine at Logelas in Cardiganshire or anyone else that Boulton & Watt cared to recommend after a valuation. Lawrence confirmed that he would run the engine "in 10 or 12 days time to wash out the pumps". It was dismantled in May 1786 and taken to Shrewsbury, where it was last heard of on the quay awaiting transport to Popham & Partners. The site of this engine is now believed to be on what is known as Old Grit Shaft. The shaft is still open here but only two walls of the engine house are still standing. An engraving of the engine as envisaged by the Boulton & Watt draughtsmen in 1783 indicates that the building was tall and graceful.

The mine was acquired by Messrs Lewis & Phillips in 1825 and, despite several lawsuits being taken out by Lawrence the previous lessee, much development took place. It was during this period that several shafts were sunk, including New Engine and White Grit Shafts, an engine house being erected at the latter. White Grit Shaft has now collapsed and the engine house has suffered badly over the years, leaving only the lever wall and parts of two others standing to the west of the road.

Lewis & Phillips gave up the lease in 1848 and the sett was worked separately as East Grit and White Grit until 1860. In 1862, John Taylor & Company acquired the lease and drove exploratory levels from the old White Grit Shaft. His main effort was at East Grit, however, and he erected an engine on New Engine Shaft. This was undoubtedly used for both winding and pumping but no details are known about the engine. The most striking feature is the large slot in the north wall which housed the flywheel, the axle of which was inside the building. The pit on the east side housed the winding drum and the cylinder was mounted on the raised foundation in the centre of the building. New Engine Shaft has now collapsed and the lever wall of the engine house has fallen.

There are a number of other shafts on the sett and one of these to the south west is called Flat Rod Shaft. This seems to indicate that the shaft had pumps operated by flat rods from one of the engine houses, possibly the one at New Engine Shaft. There is another building at the mine which is worthy of examination and this is the small round powder house to the east of the road. It consists of two concentric circular stone walls with a roof which enclosed the whole. The outer wall has a door and the inner wall a serving hatch, allowing for one way movement of miners collecting explosives. The building is in an advanced state of decay and the drawing is a reconstruction. Although a pointed roof is shown, it is possible that it had a flat sloping roof.

=== Surface Remains ===
White (or West) Grit Engine Shaft is situated at the junction of the A488 with the road to Priest Weston. The shaft, which was sunk on the intersection of the Rider and Dingle Veins, is completely blocked but a reasonable amount of the engine house still remains. The tips have been completely removed for roadstone. The arched drainage level is in the wood to the south, it is almost silted up but still issuing water. There is a line of air shafts heading north-east, mostly collapsed. One is open and is 3 ft diameter with ginging, blocked at 10 ft depth. Another just to the east of the road has been filled but this is slipping.

Rider Vein can be followed east from White Grit towards the trees on the hilltop. Three blocked shafts without names are encountered before Blue Pit, situated in a large spoil tip. On the way up, the unique circular magazine is passed on the right. Blue Pit is filled but the vein can be followed further up the hill, past some opencast workings and a collapsed shaft, to Rider Shaft on the other side of the fence. This small square shaft is open and is situated in a large spoil tip, which bears a circular depression which may mark the position of a horse gin. Rider Shaft has been measured in the past as 200 ft to water, which suggests that Wood Level is backed up (calculated depth is 230 ft below Rider Shaft collar). It was descended in 1994 to a blockage (including a dead cow) at 130 ft. At 100 ft there is a level off the shaft but this has collapsed after 5 ft.

A short distance to the south is another unnamed shaft, now blocked, and a few yards to the north is an open stopehead. The latter was descended for 30 ft in 1994 into an excavated vein. There is a squeeze into Rider Shaft and workings heading west for 40 ft to a collapse. From Rider Shaft, the line of the vein can be followed to the remains of Old Grit engine house. The pumping shaft here is open but flooded a short distance down. The three other shafts in the area, including Foxhole Air Shaft to the north-west and Bye Pit to the south-west, are blocked. Excavation of the tips at Old Grit has revealed that they consist largely of boiler ash.

South-west of Old Grit there are dressing floors and the winding engine house of New Engine (or East Grit) Shaft. This led to workings on Engine Vein, which intersects Rider Vein at Rider Shaft, but the shaft is completely filled. The engine house is similar to the one at Ladywell in that the rear wall contains a slot, presumably for a flywheel to drive winding or dressing machinery. Near this are the remains of ore bins. The track from here can be followed back to the A488, near which it crosses over Dingle or Squilver Vein.

On the south side of the track, Dingle Shaft is completely blocked, though a large stream sinks in this area. Footway Shaft, just to the north of the track, is also blocked. On the brow of the hill, Hampsons Shaft is filled but Flat Rod Shaft is open to a rubbish infill at 60 ft. The next shaft encountered is Stone Shaft, now blocked, followed by an area of gruffy ground in which Gardens Shaft and Old Shaft are located. The last shaft, Gough's Shaft, is by the side of the road and is blocked.
