= Holy Trinity Church, Sarn =

Holy Trinity Church
- Holy Trinity Church
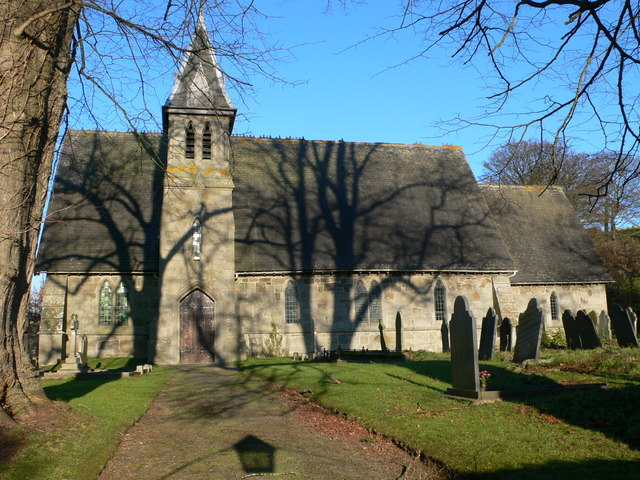
- Holy Trinity Church
- 52.5104°N 3.1714°W
- Location: Sarn, Powys
- Country: Wales
- Denomination: Church of England

History
- Status: active

Architecture
- Years built: 1860

Administration
- Diocese: Diocese of Hereford
- Parish: Sarn

Holy Trinity Church is a Church of England parish church in Sarn, Powys, Wales. It was constructed in 1860 and is one of a small number of churches in Wales where the parishioners voted in 1915 to remain with the Church of England rather than join the Church in Wales.

== Foundation ==
In 1860, owing to the distance between local parish churches and the parishioners in Sarn, a petition was made to Queen Victoria, the Supreme Governor of the Church of England, with the signatures of both the Bishop of St Davids and the Bishop of St Asaph to amalgamate the surrounding churches in the area into a consolidated chapelry. The petition also mentioned the Holy Trinity area, which only had a chapel of ease called Chapel of Llanfihangel in Kerry, Powys to serve Anglicans at the time, though there had been a Baptist church in the village since 1826. The Queen made an Order-in-Council for Holy Trinity Church to be constructed as a parish church to serve the people of Sarn and created the parish of Holy Trinity, Sarn to be under the control of the Diocese of St Davids. The church was built later that year with the church being attached to the existing chapel.

== Interior ==
The interior of the church contains a font from the 13th century that came from the original Chapel of Llanfihangel. The stained-glass windows feature images of Jesus blessing the children and of the ascension of Jesus. The church also has portrayals of Saint George and Saint Michael in its other stained glass windows. The organ was installed in 1931 and was initially hand-pumped but later was adapted to be powered by electricity.

== Referendum ==
In 1914, the Welsh Church Act 1914 was passed by the Parliament of the United Kingdom to disestablish the Church of England, as it then existed in Wales, and set up the Church in Wales. During the period while the enactment was delayed by the Suspensory Act 1914, nineteen parishes (including Sarn) were balloted by the Commissioners for Church Temporalities in Wales (commonly called the Welsh Church Commissioners) to ask whether they wanted to remain part of the Church of England or join the Church in Wales. This was because their parish boundaries crossed the border between England and Wales. Holy Trinity Church's parishioners voted 595–289 to remain part of the Church of England despite the church being located within Wales. As a result of the referendum, Holy Trinity Church left the Diocese of St Davids as that became part of the Church in Wales. Instead it was transferred to the Church of England's Diocese of Hereford.
