= Llansilin =

Village in Powys, Wales

- Village and community
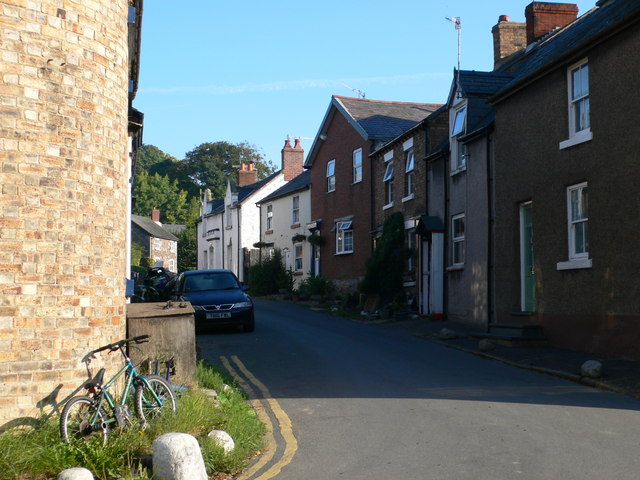
- The Oswestry Road through Llansilin

- Location within Powys
- Principal area: Powys
- Country: Wales
- Sovereign state: United Kingdom
- Police: Dyfed-Powys
- Fire: Mid and West Wales
- Ambulance: Welsh
- List of places UK Wales Powys 52.845°N 3.175°W Community map: Map of the community

Llansilin (Welsh pronunciation) is a village and community in Montgomeryshire, Powys, Wales, 5 miles (8 km) west of Oswestry. The community, which includes Llansilin village, a large rural area and the hamlets of Moelfre and Rhiwlas as well as the remote parish of Llangadwaladr, had a population of 648 at the 2001 census, increasing to 698 at the 2011 Census. There is also an electoral ward including the nearby village of Llanrhaeadr-ym-Mochnant with a population of 2,295.

== Landscape ==
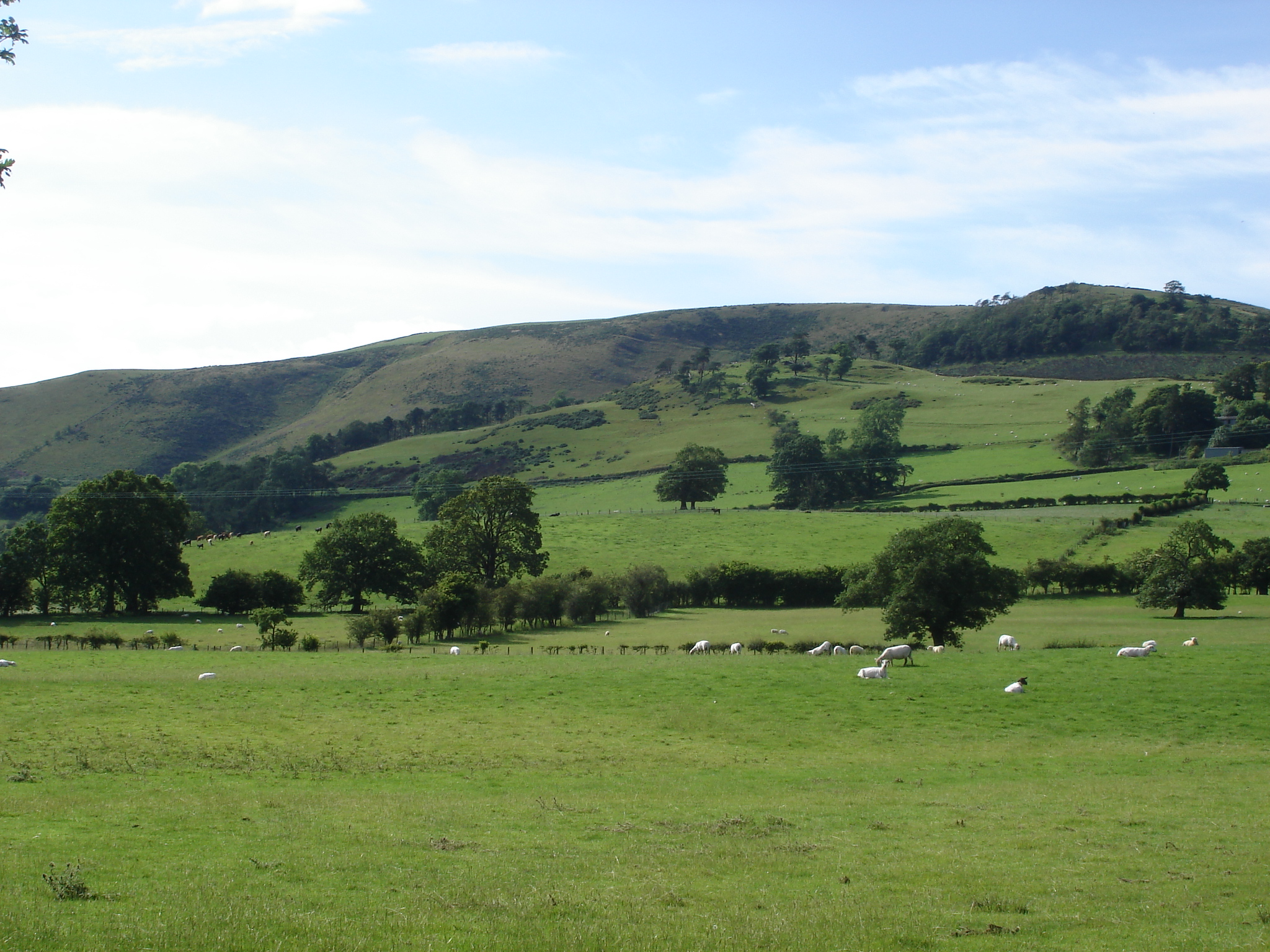
Gyrn Moelfre, Llansilin

The village was a primary location for the making of the film The Englishman Who Went Up a Hill But Came Down a Mountain, which starred Hugh Grant. The hilltop scenes were filmed on the Gyrn, the long hill that overlooks the village. It was also featured in "Monk's Hood", an episode of The Cadfael Chronicles.

== Church ==
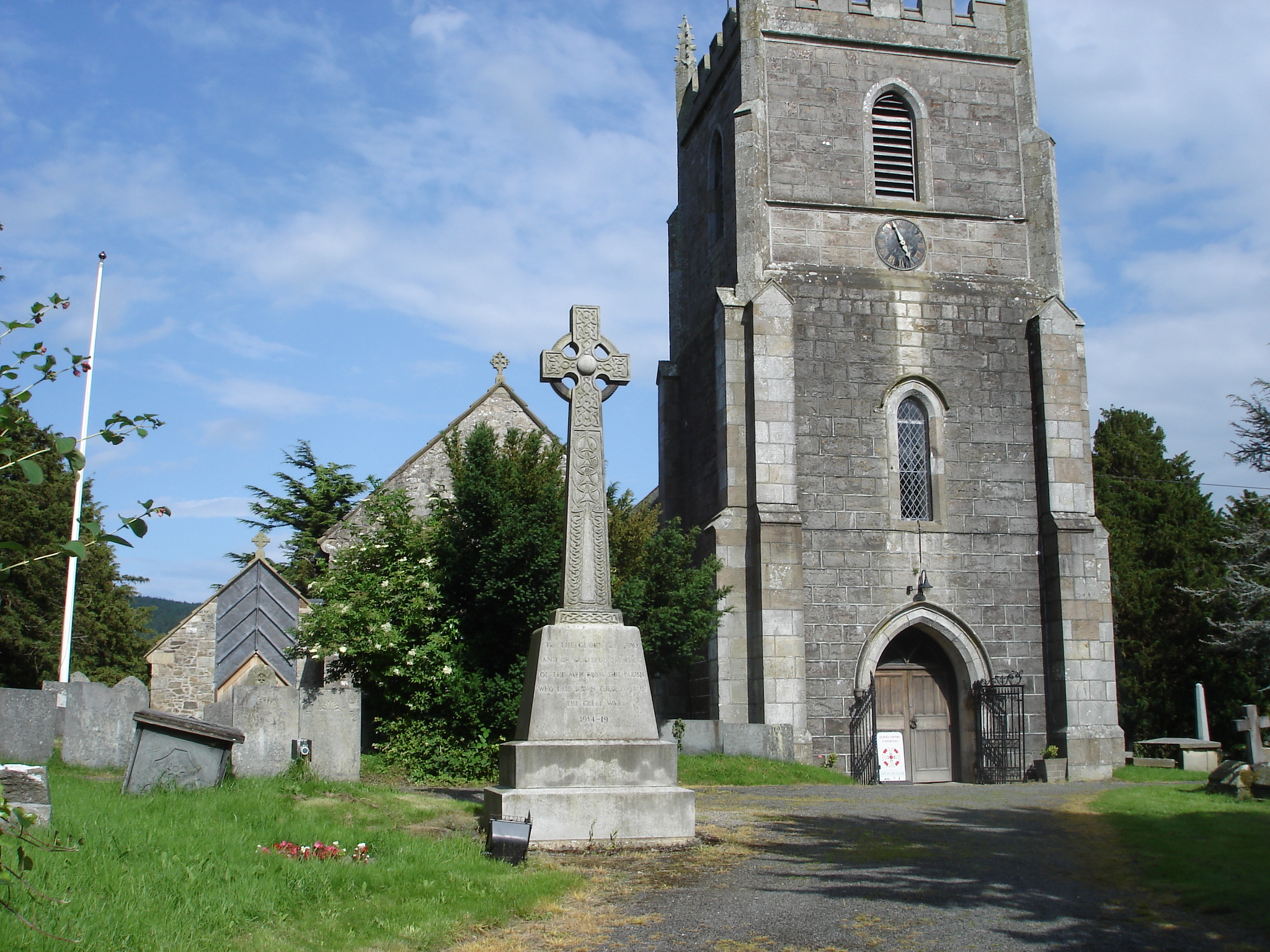
St Silin's Church.

The church in Llansilin is dedicated to Saint Silin (now better known as Sulien). The earliest part of the present building dates from the 13th century, although there had been a church on the site from much earlier times. Much of the present building dates from the early 15th century. The wooden spire was destroyed by fire, and the present tower was built in 1832. There was a major restoration during 1889/1890, and the church was re-opened in June 1890. The church was in Denbighshire until 1974, and in Clwyd from 1974 until 1996. It is now in Powys, following boundary revisions in 1996.

The churchyard contains the grave of Welsh poet Huw Morus, the "Nightingale of Ceiriog", and war graves of two British soldiers of World War I.

== Notable residents ==
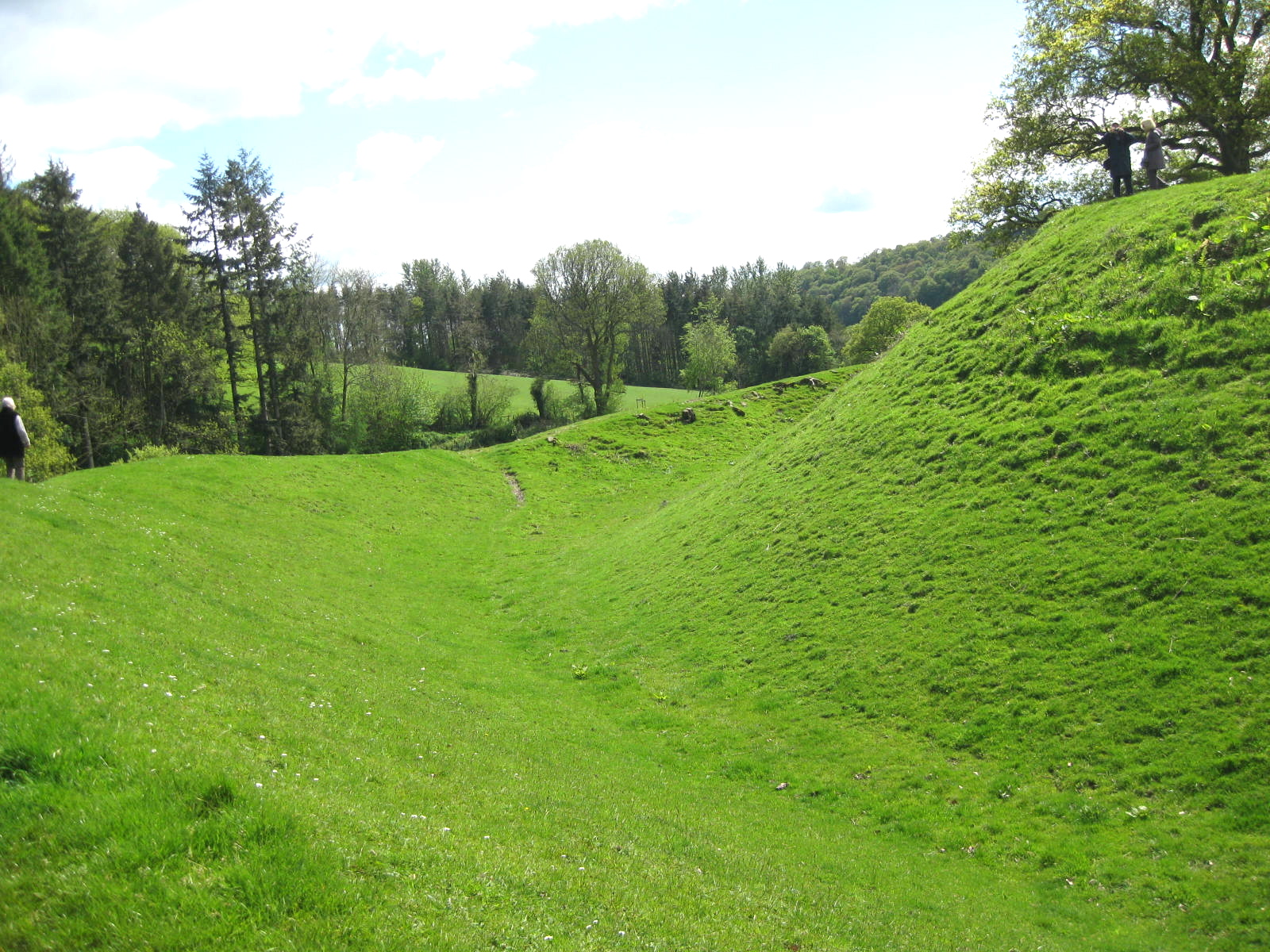
Sycharth, Motte and Bailey Castle, Llansilin, Powys

Owain Glyndŵr, the last native Welshman to hold the title Prince of Wales (Tywysog Cymru), was born and had his palace in the motte and bailey castle at Sycharth in the parish.

Welsh poet Huw Morus lived in the parish from 1647 until his death in 1709.

German Neoclassical metal guitarist Uli Jon Roth has a home in Llansilin.
