= Corndon Hill =

Hill in Powys, Wales

Coordinates: 52.56548°N 3.02528°W

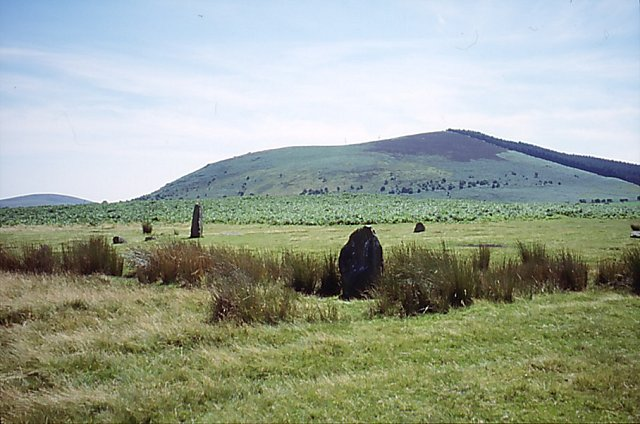
- Corndon Hill above the Mitchell's Fold stone circle, looking south

Highest point
- Elevation: 514 m (1,686 ft)
- Prominence: 203 m (666 ft)
- Parent peak: Stiperstones
- Listing: Marilyn

Geography
- Location: Powys, Wales
- Parent range: Shropshire Hills
- OS grid: SO306969
- Topo map: OS Landranger 137

Corndon Hill (Welsh: Cornatyn) is a hill in Powys, Mid Wales, whose summit rises to 513.6 metres (1,685 ft) above sea level. It has a topographic prominence of 203.1 metres (666 ft), so is listed as a Marilyn.

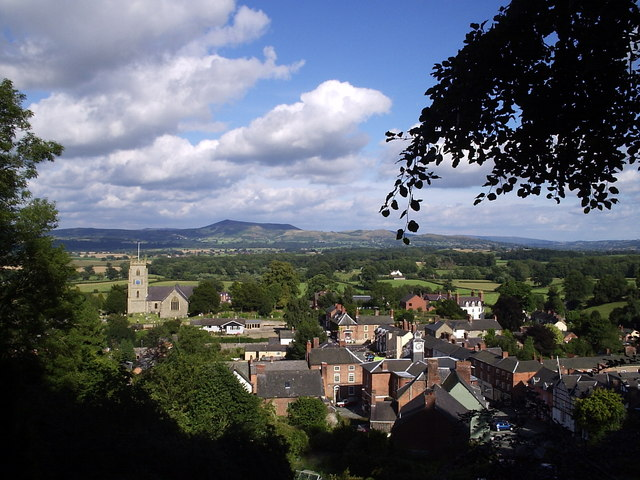
Corndon Hill as seen from Montgomery, looking east

It is surrounded on three sides by the English county of Shropshire, and forms a prominent landmark in the England–Wales border. Corndon's prominent western edge appears to form a separate hill and is known locally as Lan Fawr (Welsh: 'Big Hill'). It is frequented by walkers and ramblers from car parks nearby, at Mitchell's Fold for example. There are spectacular panoramic views from the summit, and it is itself an important landmark for the surrounding countryside and towns like Montgomery. It is close to villages such as Church Stoke and Hyssington.

The hill is geologically part of the Shropshire Hills range, which lies mainly to the north, east and south of the summit. The immediate area to the west is the Vale of Montgomery and the River Severn. The Cambrian Mountains are visible beyond to the far west. The Stiperstones and Shelve lie to the immediate north-east, with Caer Caradoc and the Long Mynd to the east.

== Archaeology ==
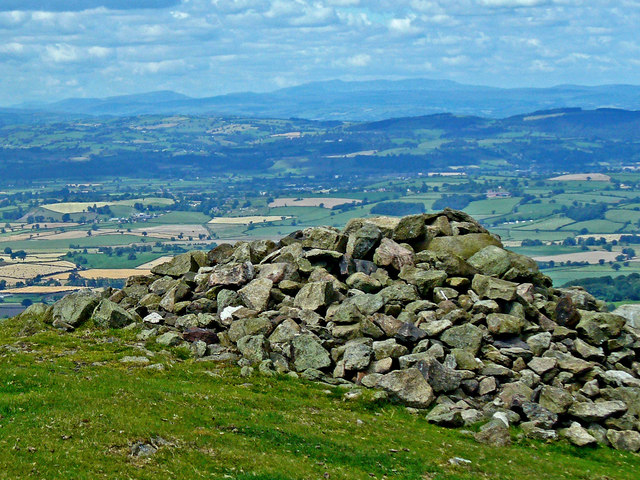
Bronze Age cairn on the summit of Corndon Hill

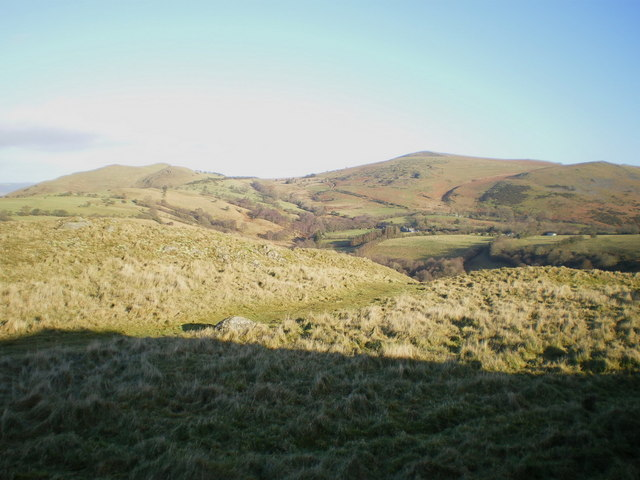
Roundton Hill looking NNE towards Corndon Hill

There is a large Bronze Age cairn near the hill summit, and several more exist in the area around the summit. Such circular stone burial cairns are common on most summits in Wales, and they commonly date from ca 2500 BC until ca 700 BC, when iron slowly started to displace bronze for tools and other goods. Such cairns usually contain one or more cremation urns, which are often placed within a stone cyst or box within the mound.

The Bronze Age stone circles of Mitchell's Fold and the now largely destroyed The Whetstones lie at the foot of the hill within Shropshire and Powys respectively. There is another circle nearby in Shropshire, the Hoarstones.

The hill lies about 4 miles (6.4 km) east of Offa's Dyke, built during the 8th century to mark the border between Wales and England (or Mercia).

== Stone Axe Factory (Group XII) ==
In 1951 Professor F W Shotton of Birmingham University identified the source of the rock used for shaft-hole battle axes, splitting mauls and axe hammers as picrite which had been quarried from Corndon Hill. Picrite is a hard volcanic or igneous rock. Production sites of stone hand axes and shaft-hole implements have been grouped by petrology, and the Hyssington/Corndon Hill implements are known as Group XII. As the production of these implements in the Late Neolithic and Early Bronze Age did not employ the same flaking techniques as flint stone axes, which leave recognisable flaking debris, the site or sites of the Corndon Group XII implements production will be harder to identify. However, the Clwyd-Powys Archaeological Trust did excavate several small quarry depressions in 2008, but found only evidence of fairly recent disturbance. A stone slab with striations, which was suggested was an example of Neolithic art, could equally well have been early plough marks or a hone for sharpening stone edges

The main distribution of Group XII implements is in mid-Wales, the Midlands, the Cotswolds, and stretching across to East Anglia. By 1988, 93 examples of these implements had been identified; all of these implements have shaft holes for hafting, and there are no examples of picrite being used to produce axes.

== Quarrying ==
The Corndon flagstone quarries are on the south-western slopes of Corndon Hill and date from medieval times. From the air, the quarries are still a prominent feature in the landscape. In this area, the altered Hope Shales of the Ordovician Period on the margin of the dolerite (diabase) produce finely laminated flagstones, which were widely used on building on the Shropshire–Montgomeryshire border. Only a few buildings still have the flagstones as roofing slates, including the Old Post Office at Church Stoke and the porch to Hurdley Farmhouse.
