= Thomas Kerrich =

English clergyman and artist (1748 - 1828)

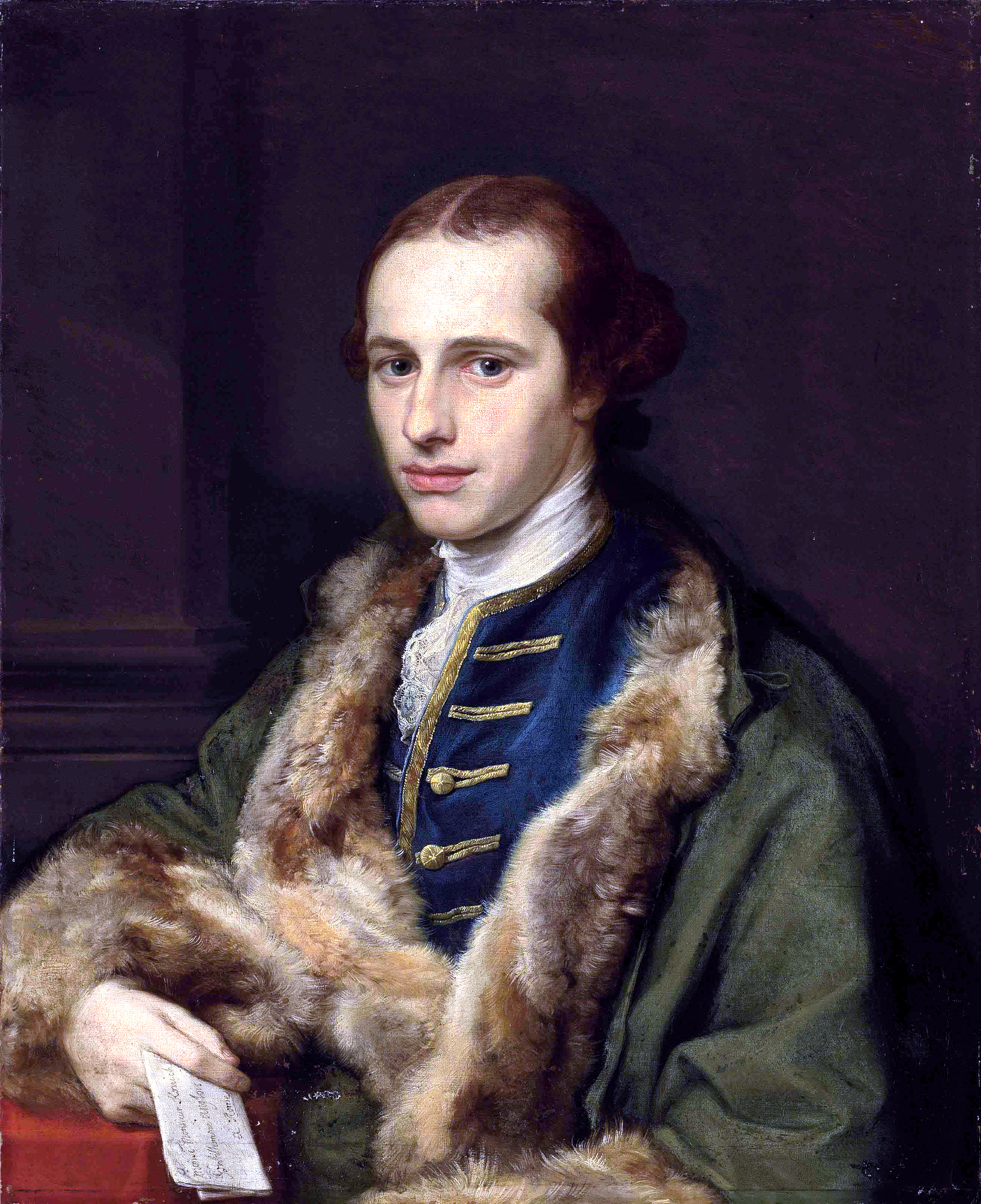
Thomas Kerrich, by Pompeo Batoni, c. 1774, previously at Geldeston Hall, Norfolk

Thomas Kerrich (4 February 1748 – 10 May 1828) was an English clergyman, principal Cambridge University Librarian (Protobibliothecarius), antiquary, draughtsman, and gifted amateur artist. He created one of the first catalogue raisonnés (for the works of the artist Marten van Heemskerck).

== Life ==
Thomas Kerrich was born at Dersingham in Norfolk, England, where his father, Samuel, was the vicar. After graduating with a B.A. from Magdalene College, Cambridge, in 1771, he went on the Grand Tour where he encountered Thomas Coke. Kerrich was a Fellow of Magdalene and a Fellow of the Society of Antiquaries from 1797.

He collected Roman coins and published papers on architecture, sepulchres and coffins.

In 1816, he bought and restored the Leper Chapel in Cambridge. He gave the chapel to the university, which in turn gave it to the Cambridge Preservation Society in 1951. Many art galleries have works by Kerrich in their collections.

Kerrich died in Cambridge on 10 May 1828.

== Personal life ==
Kerrich married Sophia Hayles (1762–1835), fourth daughter of the physician Richard Hayles, on 13 September 1798.

The couple had one son and two daughters. The younger daughter, Frances Margaretta Kerrich, was married on 9 December 1828 to Rev. Charles Henry Hartshorne (1802–1865). The son was the Rev. Richard Edward Kerrich (1801–1872).

== Publications ==
- Kerrich, Thomas (1812). "Some Observations on the Gothic Buildings abroad, particularly those in Italy; and on Gothic Architecture in general". Archaeologia. 16: 292–235. doi:10.1017/S0261340900019433.
- Kerrich, Thomas (1817). "Observations upon some sepulchral monuments in Italy and France". Archaeologia. 18: 186–196. doi:10.1017/S0261340900026126.
- Kerrich, Thomas (1821). "Observations on the use of the mysterious figure, called Vesica Piscis, in the Architecture of the Middle Ages, and in Gothic Architecture". Archaeologia. 19: 353–368. doi:10.1017/S0261340900023067.
