= Vale of Montgomery =

Valley in Wales and England

Coordinates: 52°33′22″N 3°06′21″W

The Vale of Montgomery (Welsh: Dyffryn Trefaldwyn) is an area of low land straddling the border between Shropshire, England and the former county of Montgomeryshire (part of modern Powys), Wales. The three principal settlements within it are the former county town of Montgomery (Welsh: Trefaldwyn) and the village of Churchstoke (Welsh: Yr Ystog), both in Wales, and Chirbury in England. The earthworks of Offa's Dyke run NNW-ESE through the middle of the vale and are followed by the Offa's Dyke Path. The national boundary also follows this monument for 3 km within the vale. The River Camlad rises to the southeast of the vale whilst its tributary the Caebitra rises to its southwest. They combine at Churchstoke and flow north within a gorge along the eastern margin of the vale, before turning west across the north end of the vale to join the River Severn.
