= 1915–1916 Church of England border polls =

1910s parish polls on England–Wales border

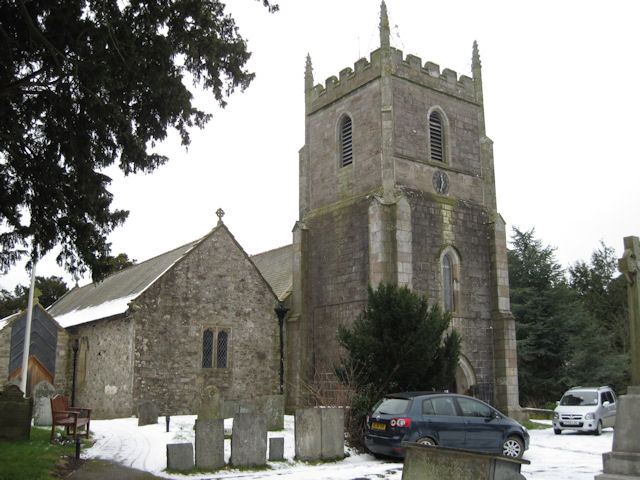
Llansilin Parish Church, the only parish to vote to join the Church in Wales

Map of the Church of England parishes within Wales, as of 2026. Llansilin not shown.

The Church of England border polls 1915–1916 were a series of referendums held in January and February 1915 (with second polls being held in two parishes in March 1916), for residents living in nineteen Church of England ecclesiastical (Note: The provision was relevant only to ecclesiastical parishes: any civil parishes which had straddled the border would have been divided, and made separate parishes, or one or both parts added to other parishes, as a result of orders made under section 36 of the Local Government Act 1894, which required parishes not to cross the boundaries of administrative counties or districts.) parishes, the boundaries of which crossed the England–Wales border. They were carried out to determine if the parish residents wished their parish to remain part of the Church of England or to become part of the Church in Wales when the Welsh Church Act 1914 took effect. (Its implementation was delayed because of the First World War and it did not take effect until 31 March 1920). The polls eventually resulted in all but one of the border parishes voting to remain with the Church of England.

== Background ==
The Welsh Church Act 1914 was passed by parliament to disestablish the Church of England in Wales and Monmouthshire. Section 9 of the act provided for the Commissioners for Church Temporalities in Wales (commonly called "The Welsh Church Commissioners") to hold referendums in the nineteen areas defined as "border parishes", parishes whose ecclesiastical boundaries straddled the temporal boundary between England and Wales, to decide if the parish wanted to join the Church in Wales when it was disestablished or to remain part of the established Church of England. Section 9 of the Welsh Church Act required the Commissioners to ascertain "the general wishes of the parishioners" but did not specify how "parishioners" was to be defined. The Commissioners therefore interpreted the provision broadly. The Welsh Church Act provided that the Church in Wales parishes would no longer retain private endowments granted to them before 1662 (though this was later partly compensated for by the Welsh Church (Temporalities) Act 1919).

== Electorate ==
The eligibility to vote in the ballots was extended to all men and women over 21 who lived in the respective parishes; non-resident ratepayers were also entitled to vote. The inclusion of all men and women over 21 extended the voting franchise beyond the limited franchise given to women by the Local Government Act 1894. It was one of the first examples of universal suffrage in the United Kingdom prior to the introduction of the Representation of the People (Equal Franchise) Act 1928, which gave women the same voting rights as men in parliamentary elections. However, the extended franchise meant that there was no suitable register for the Commissioners to use, which exacerbated their difficulties in holding the elections. They also posted ballot papers to parishioners serving in the British Armed Forces. Turnout for the votes was high compared to other elections.

== Results ==
The results of the referendums were given as a Written Answer in the House of Commons by the Home Secretary, Reginald McKenna. When reporting, the Commissioners took the view that, in spite of the difficulty in conducting the elections, in all the 17 parishes for which results were published there was a "marked preponderance of opinion" in favour of remaining part of the Church of England, so they needed to take no further action. The results of the ballots in Llansilin and Rhydycroesau were not published as they were deemed to be too close to call. A second referendum, using a more precise ballot, was therefore held in March 1916. Rhydycroesau voted to remain with the Church of England, and Llansilin was the only parish to vote in favour of joining the Church in Wales. Because of the results, when disestablishment did happen in 1920, parishes and churches which were in a Welsh diocese were transferred to nearby Church of England dioceses for episcopal oversight. For example, Holy Trinity Church, Sarn in Wales was part of the Diocese of St Davids but as that became a diocese of the Church in Wales, it was transferred to the Church of England's Diocese of Hereford.

Results of parish border polls held January/February 1915
Parish	Ballots issued	Votes for Church of England	Votes for Church in Wales	Spoilt ballots
Alberbury	414	273	28	15
Brampton Bryan	211	168	23	8
Brilley with Michaelchurch-on-Arrow	244	192	27	5
Churchstoke	596	390	70	31
Dixton Newton	304	209	29	17
Dodleston	430	279	93	49
Great Wollaston	242	173	37	14
Hyssington with Snead	185	108	33	17
Kentchurch with Llangua (Note: "Llangua" misprinted "Langan" in Hansard.)	213	107	38	7
Lache-cum-Saltney	1,640	854	228	76
Llanymynech	526	315	130	23
Lydham	108	91	6	11
Mainstone	143	85	20	28
Middleton	188	156	16	9
Old Radnor	508	344	99	30
Presteigne with Discoed	1,059	595	289	52
Sarn	282	140	96	21

Results of second parish border polls held in March 1916
Parish	Ballots issued	Votes for Church of England	Votes for Church in Wales	Spoilt ballots
Llansilin	565	228	255	66
Rhydycroesau	204	98	78	21
