= Shelve, Shropshire =

Hamlet in Shropshire, England

Coordinates: 52.584°N 2.980°W

Shelve
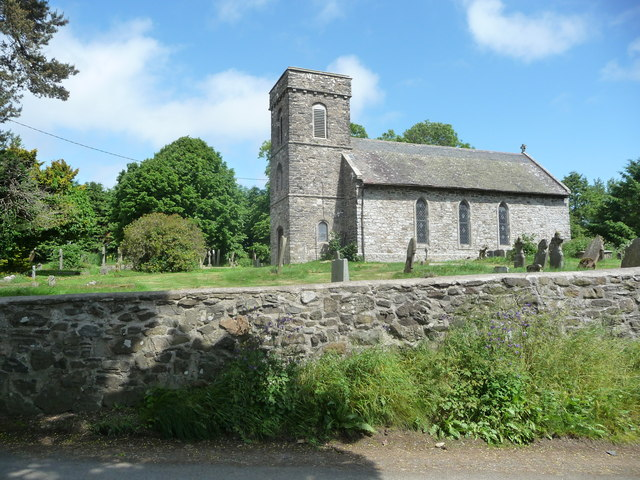
- All Saints Church, Shelve

- Location within Shropshire
- Civil parish: Worthen with Shelve
- Unitary authority: Shropshire
- Ceremonial county: Shropshire
- Region: West Midlands
- Country: England
- Sovereign state: United Kingdom

Shelve is a hamlet and former civil parish, now in the parish of Worthen with Shelve in Shropshire district of Shropshire, England. It is to the west of the Stiperstones ridge and east of Stapeley Hill, at an altitude of about 342 metres (1,122 ft), and is some 2 miles (3.2 km) from the England–Wales border to the west. In 1961 the parish had a population of 102.

The Church of All Saints is grade II listed and was built in 1839 to replace a medieval church. 17th-century pews from the former church were used to create the panelling, pulpit and reading desk in the new church. It is an active church in the Stiperstones group of churches, with a Sunday service every third week as of 2023.

In 1870-72 the Imperial Gazetteer of England and Wales described Shelve as a hamlet and parish of 1,285 acres (520 ha; 2.008 sq mi) with a population of 78 in 16 houses, and said that it was once a market town. The parish was abolished on 1 April 1987 and combined with the parish of Worthen to form the new parish of "Worthen with Shelve".
