= St Silin's Church, Llansilin =

Coordinates: 52°50′43″N 3°10′30″W

St Silin's Church
- Church of St Silin
- Eglwys San Silin
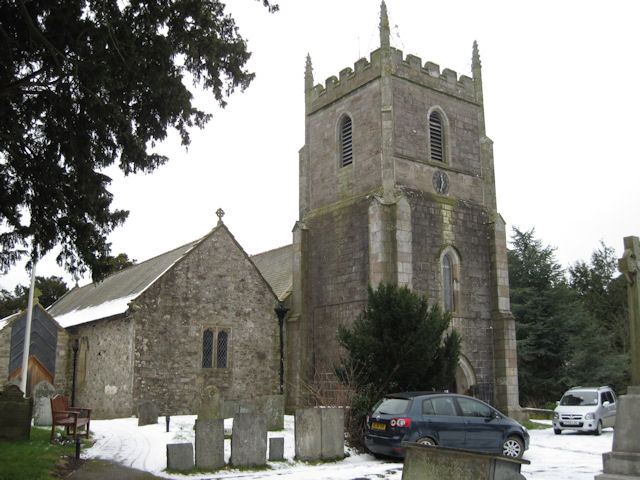
- St Silin's Church
- Location: Llansilin, Powys
- Country: Wales
- Denomination: Church in Wales
- Previous denomination: Church of England

History
- Status: open

Architecture
- Heritage designation: Grade I

Administration
- Diocese: St Asaph
- Parish: Llansilin

St Silin's Church is a Church in Wales parish church in Llansilin, Montgomeryshire, Powys, Wales. The present building, which has parts dating back to the 13th century, is a Grade I listed building. It stands on a site that has been used by Christian communities since the Dark Ages. The church is dedicated to Saint Silin, now better known as Saint Sulien, the 6th-century founder-abbot of a monastery at Luxulyan in Cornwall.

St Silin was the only parish in the Welsh Marches on the England–Wales border that voted to leave the Church of England under provisions of the Welsh Church Act 1914 that led to the creation of the Church in Wales.

== History ==
The church was constructed out of wood in a cruciform shape as a Clas, though it was damaged during Owain Glyndŵr's rebellion and the nave was rebuilt in stone. A 13th-century lancet remains a part of the current building. During the English Civil War, Oliver Cromwell's Roundheads used the church as a barracks and the south door for target practice with muskets. It was also shot at by Royalist forces sieging the church; the door is still in use and still retains the bullet holes. The wooden spire of the church burned down in the 1800s and a replacement stone tower was built in 1832.

== Parish ==
St Silin's Church serves the Welsh parish of Llansilin in the Diocese of St Asaph. Part of the parish crosses the England–Wales border to include part of the English county of Shropshire owing to boundary changes made by King Henry VIII in 1536. As a result of the ecclesiastical border crossing the temporal border, in 1915 the Welsh Church Commissioners, acting under the Welsh Church Act 1914, classed Llansilin as one of 19 border parishes, meaning that residents of the parish were entitled to take part in the Church of England border polls 1915–1916 to determine if they wished to stay with the established Church of England or join the Church in Wales when it was separated and disestablished. The referendum results for 17 of the 19 parishes were published in the House of Commons, all in favour of remaining part of the Church of England. However, in the parishes of Llansilin and Rhydycroesau, the result was considered too close to call. A second poll was therefore held in 1916; Llansilin voted to join the Church in Wales by 255–228, becoming the only parish in the referendums to do so. As a result, the parish contains the only part of England where the church is under the jurisdiction of the Church in Wales instead of the Church of England, and so is unique in England in having a disestablished church.

== Listed building ==
St Silin's Church was granted Grade I listed status in 1966. The reason given for the listing was because the church was "preserving unusually fine 15th century and some earlier fabric, plus important post-mediaeval features, and which has undergone sensitive restoration by Baker in the 19th century leading to a result of exceptional character."
