= Stapeley Hill =

Hill in Shropshire, England

Coordinates: 52.583°N 3.017°W

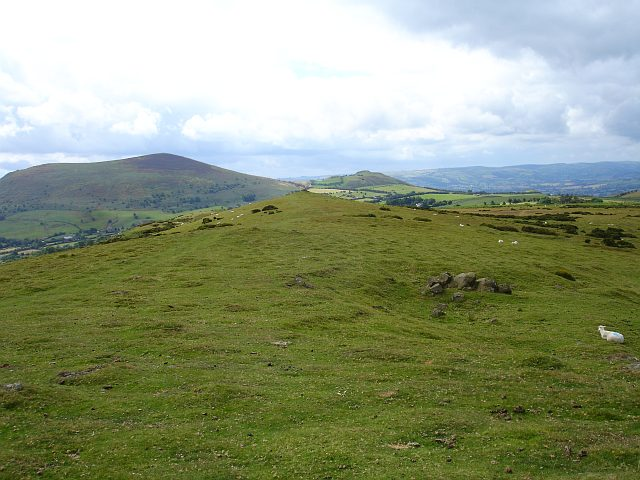
Stapeley Hill with Corndon Hill in the background

Stapeley Hill is a sacred saddleback shaped hill in south-west Shropshire, near the village of Priestweston, not far from another landmark, Corndon Hill.

The hill is home to the Mitchell's Fold stone circle. Along the path leading from the Fold across Stapeley Common stand the Cow Stone (a single standing stone or menhir) and the Stapeley Hill Ring Cairn. There are two Bronze Age cairns at or near the summit; such round cairns are also a common feature of Welsh mountain summits.

The hill rises to an elevation of 403 metres (1,322 ft), and lies in the civil parish of Chirbury with Brompton.

== Notable Resident ==
Victoria Cross recipient John Doogan farmed here between 1926 and 1937.
