= River Camlad =

River in Powys, Wales and Shropshire, England

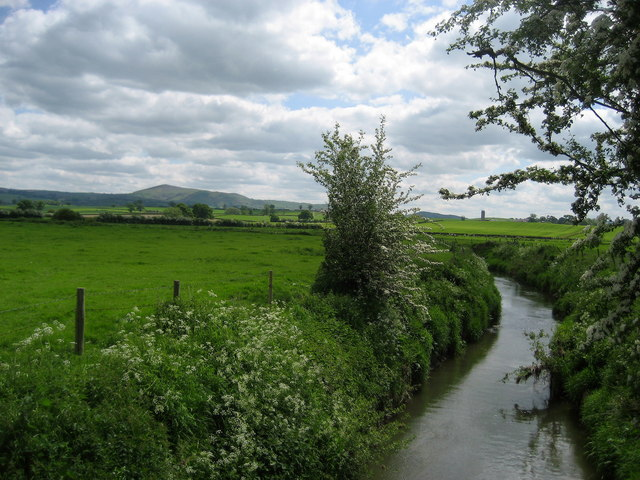
- The river, here forming the English-Welsh border, to the northwest of Chirbury

Location
- Country: Wales, England
- Counties: Powys, Shropshire

Physical characteristics
- Mouth
  - location: confluence with River Severn near Forden
  - coordinates: 52.5972°N 3.1693°W

The River Camlad (or just Camlad) is a minor river in Powys and Shropshire. It forms part of the border between Wales and England in places, before flowing into the River Severn. It is notable for being the only river to cross from England into Wales and does so twice.

The river originates in England, in the area between Snead and Lydham, flows west, forming part of the border between Wales and England, before flowing northwest into Wales. It passes through Church Stoke, where the River Caebitra flows into the Camlad. From Church Stoke it flows north, crossing the border back into England, and flows just east of Chirbury before turning west again, and forms the border (for the second time) between England and Wales. It turns northwest into Wales (for the second time) to join the River Severn to the west of Forden.

== Toponymy ==
Early forms include the Kemelet (1227), Kemlet (1256), Kelemet 1274, Camalet and Kenlet (1577), and Camlet (1612). Ekwall proposes the Welsh cwlm meaning "a knot" (which is found in other river names) giving a hypothetical Old Welsh Culmet then Cylmet whence Kelemet, alternatively Cym(y)let from the Old Welsh for "loop".
