= Churchstoke =

Churchstoke: Welsh: Yr Ystog
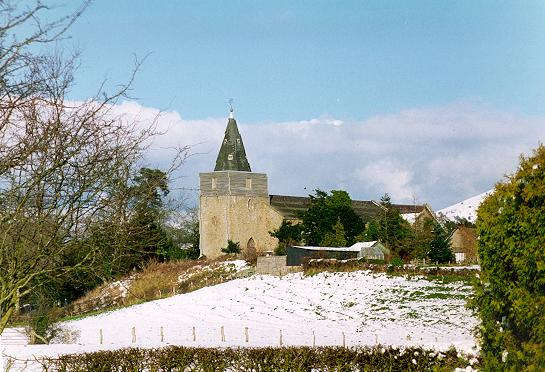
- St Nicholas' church, Churchstoke

- Location within Powys
- Area: 54.31 km^{2} (20.97 sq mi)
- Population: 1,691 (2011)
  - Density: 31/km^{2} (80/sq mi)
- Principal area: Powys
- Preserved county: Powys
- Country: Wales
- Sovereign state: United Kingdom
- Post town: Montgomery
- Postcode district: SY15
- Dialling code: 01588
- Police: Dyfed-Powys
- Fire: Mid and West Wales
- Ambulance: Welsh
- UK Parliament: Montgomeryshire and Glyndŵr
- Senedd Cymru – Welsh Parliament: Montgomeryshire
- List of places UK Wales Powys 52.540°N 3.077°W Community map: Map of the community

Churchstoke (Welsh: Yr Ystog; also spelled as Church Stoke) is a village, community and electoral ward in Montgomeryshire, Powys, Wales. Located in the southeast of the Vale of Montgomery, it is overlooked by Todleth Hill, Roundton Hill and Corndon Hill. The rivers Caebitra and Camlad have their confluence just outside the village. The nearest town is Montgomery. In the 2011 census the village had a population of 708.

The community of Churchstoke covers a wider area than the village, including the neighbouring villages of Hyssington and The Marsh. Recently the detached part of the community around Weston Madoc was transferred to Montgomery's community. The community is situated on a salient and covers an area of over 50 square miles (130 km^{2}).

== Etymology ==
The placename identifies it as a farm (or settlement) with a church; it was recorded as 'Cirestoc' in 1086 in the Domesday Book.

== St. Nicholas Church ==
The parish church today is largely the result of 19th-century rebuilding, but retains its 13th-century tower with a later timber belfry. From the period before the 19th century, only a font, a stoup and a chest have survived up to three phases of restoration and reconstruction. The main body of the church with its large high pitched roof dates to the second half of the 19th century, although the sequence of construction is not completely clear.

The layout of the churchyard and its location immediately above the River Camlad suggests an early medieval origin. In 1881 the interior was laid out in its present form and the church was rededicated to Saint Nicholas (having previously been dedicated to St. Mary).

The church has a 13th-century square tower at the western end, reduced in height in 1812 with a typical Montgomeryshire style timber-framed belfry and a pyramidal roof which was re-tiled with oak roof shingles in 2005. The tower was used as a place of refuge during 14th-century feuds and later in English Civil War battles. In 1646 the Parliamentarians attacked the Royalists who were planning to stay overnight at Churchstoke. The Royalists took refuge in the church and in the ensuing battle the Parliamentarians set fire to the church door forcing the Royalists to surrender.

The wooden belfry and the spire were added in 1815. The clock was installed in 1887. There is a suggestion that the tower was originally higher than it stands now.

In 1751 the south wall of the church was taken down and a new south aisle was constructed. In 1812 the old church was taken down and a new nave was built using stone from Churchstoke Hall and Churchstoke Quarries. It was roofed with slate from Corndon Hill and included a schoolroom and galleries. The present iron columns, made in Coalbrookdale, presumably carried the galleries. The columns, which have octagonal stone bases and square decorative capitals, now support the lowered roofline. In 1881 the schoolroom and galleries were removed along with the old box pews and the interior was laid out in its present form. The exterior buttresses were added together with the nave windows and the ground level lowered around the church. The north and south walls of the chancel were rebuilt, and a new south porch was added. The aisles are divided from the nave by arcades of six bays above which is a frieze of timber arcading.

The chancel is supposed to have been added in 1867 and is narrower than the nave. There are encaustic floor tiles throughout the chancel and sanctuary, and the tiled reredos has recently been uncovered. There is a piscina in the south wall of the chancel, and three 19th Century brasses. These were probably added in 1867. The south transept houses the organ and the north transept forms the choir vestry underneath which is the boiler house.

The church is situated in a raised sub-circular churchyard which has been extended in recent times. A few signs of musket shots from the skirmishes in the Civil War can still be seen, notably on the soffit of the upper storey round-headed window on the north wall of the tower. The graveyard extension to the west of the church was consecrated in 1868. The earliest gravestone recorded is a sandstone slab to Sarah (died 1749) and Hugh Pugh (died 1768). There is a sundial without gnomon on the south side of the church near the entrance porch. There are many fine mature trees in the graveyard, which are protected by law, as they are in the Conservation Area.

Although physically in Wales, the churches at Hyssington and Churchstoke are within the Church of England Diocese of Hereford. When the Welsh Church Act 1914 had been passed to disestablish the Church in Wales, Churchstoke, and Hyssington with Snead parishes both straddled the England-Wales border. The Welsh Church Commissioners therefore carried out a ballot of parishioners in 1915 to decide whether the parishes of Churchstoke and Hyssington with Snead should remain part of the Church of England, or form part of the Church in Wales. The parishioners in Churchstoke voted by 390 to 70, and those in Hyssington with Snead by 108 to 33, to remain part of the Church of England.

== Methodist church ==
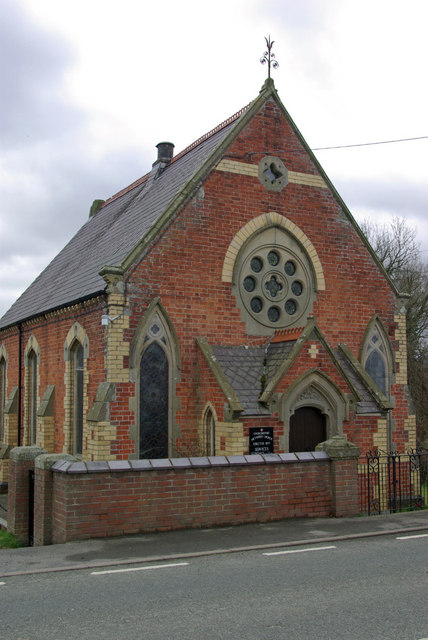
Churchstoke Methodist Church

Churchstoke English Methodist church was built in 1879. A Gothic Revival building, it is built of polychromatic brick under a slate roof. A plaque records the building's construction.

== Today ==
The village has many facilities including a large supermarket (Midcounties Co-operative, formerly Harry Tuffins), as well as a primary school, two public houses (The Horse and Jockey and The Court House Hotel), a Chinese takeaway and fresh locally made ice cream. A market is also held here on Sundays. The central area of Churchstoke is a conservation area.

According to the 2011 Census, Churchstoke is the community with the 2nd lowest proportion of Welsh speakers in Wales. Only 4.3% of people in the community claim to speak the language.

According to details published by the Co-operative Group on its bottles, both Co-op Fairbourne Springs Water and their Sparkling Natural Mineral Water are bottled at source in Churchstoke.

== Governance ==
Churchstoke has a community council representing the community's interests, with nine councillors elected from Churchstoke and three from Hyssington.

The Churchstoke electoral ward is represented by a county councillor on Powys County Council. Since 1995 the ward has elected an independent councillor.

== Notable people ==
Admiral Sir Michael Pollock (1916–2006) lived at Churchstoke following his retirement from the Royal Navy while the Australian artist and lecturer, May Marsden, was born here in 1876.
