= Charles Henry Hartshorne =

English cleric and antiquarian (1802–1865)

Charles Henry Hartshorne (17 March 1802 – 11 March 1865) was an English cleric and antiquary.

== Life ==
Born at Broseley in Shropshire on 17 March 1802, he was the only child of John Hartshorne, an ironmaster,. He was educated at Shrewsbury School, and in 1821 entered St John's College, Cambridge, as a "pensioner", that is to say self-funded. He graduated B.A. in 1825, and M.A. in 1828.

In 1825 Hartshorne was invited by his friend Frederick North, 5th Earl of Guilford, who had been appointed "archon" over the University of Corfu he had founded, to accompany him to the island, which was then ruled by the British. He travelled through Italy and made a tour in the Levant. In 1826 he returned to England. There he encountered gossip and innuendo that had blown up in his absence, concerned with a friendship he had made through the Roxburghe Club of bibliophiles with Richard Heber. John Bull hinted over two of its issues at the idea that the relationship of Heber and Hartshorne was homosexual. Heber had abruptly left the country; Hartshorne pursued John Bull successfully through the courts.

Hartshorne had thought of applying to work at the British Museum, but after the scandal had little choice of career. In 1827 he followed early advice from James Allan Park, and was ordained.

Hartshorne was curate at Benthall, Shropshire, from 1825 to 1828, and from 1828 to 1836 at Little Wenlock. After two years at Leamington he took charge of the parish of Cogenhoe, Northamptonshire, from 1838 till 1850, when he was presented by the crown to the rectory of Holdenby in the same county. He was honorary chaplain to the seventh and eighth Dukes of Bedford, and fellow of the Society of Antiquaries of London. He died suddenly at Holdenby on 11 March 1865 aged 62.

== Works ==
Hartshorne published:

- A Geyfte ffor the Newe Yere, or a playne, plesaunte, and profytable Pathewaie to the Black Letter Paradyse. Emprinted over the grete Gatewaie off Saincte Jhonnes College, 1825; twenty copies (including two on vellum) were printed. Three copies are known today, at St John's College Cambridge, the British Library and the Bodleian. A fourth copy, the location of which is unknown, was sold at Christies (2 June 1999) for £2070. It was printed on vellum.
- The Book Rarities of the University of Cambridge, 1829
- Ancient Metrical Tales, 1829, referred to by Walter Scott in the Introduction to Ivanhoe
- Sepulchral Remains in Northamptonshire, 1840
- Salopia Antiqua; or an Enquiry into the Early Remains in Shropshire and the North Welsh Borders, including a Glossary of the Provincial Dialect of Shropshire, 1841
- "English Medieval Embroidery". Archaeological Journal. 1: 318–335. 1845 – via Wikisource.
- "English Medieval Embroidery, section the second", in Archaeological Journal, vol. 4, 1847, pp. 285–301
- English Medieval Embroidery, 1848 [see review by J. H. Parker in Archaeological Journal, vol. 5, 1848, p. 171]
- Historical Memorials of Northampton, 1848
- Memoirs illustrative of the History and Antiquities of Northumberland, 1858, a valuable contribution to the history of the borders

Hartshorne contributed an article on The Latin Plays acted before the University of Cambridge to the Retrospective Review; and wrote in the Archæological Journal. His archæological papers deal with the architectural history of mediæval towns and castles; medieval parliaments; the royal councils of Worcester; the obsequies of Catherine of Aragon; early remains in the great isle of Arran; the itineraries of Edward I and II; and domestic manners in the reign of Edward I. He wrote on the drainage of the Nene Valley, and subjects in the social science.

== Family ==
In 1828 Hartshorne married Frances Margaretta, younger daughter of the Rev. Thomas Kerrich.

== Notes ==
Attribution

This article incorporates text from a publication now in the public domain: Stephen, Leslie; Lee, Sidney, eds. (1891). "Hartshorne, Charles Henry". Dictionary of National Biography. Vol. 25. London: Smith, Elder & Co.
