= Snead, Powys =

Coordinates: 52.525°N 3.013°W

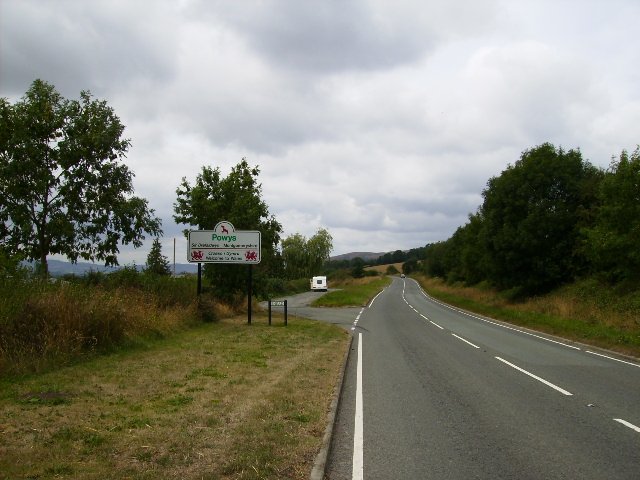
The border between England and Wales at Snead

Snead is a small village in Powys, Wales.

It is situated on the A489 road and the River Camlad. The English border is immediately to the east of the village. The small town of Bishop's Castle is 2.0 miles (3.2 km) to the south.

A monastery existed here c. 1200, before moving to Chirbury in Shropshire by 1227.

Apothecary and chronicler Oliver Mathews (c. 1520–c. 1618), the first historian of Shrewsbury, retired to live at Snead.

The small St Mary's Church of Snead is uniquely positioned on the banks of the River Camlad. Recent archeological investigations have shown that 11th century dwellings or buildings formerly existed very close to the church. A village of Snead was possibly built with the church in its midst, or perhaps it was built as the Chapel of the Priory founded hereabouts in the 12th century by Lord of Montgomery, Robert de Buthlers. The Priory was later moved to Chirbury.

Not much larger than a chapel, the church has a small belfry, where medieval bells have recently been restored to their positions. The church is surrounded by a small raised churchyard with retaining walls and ditches. This indicates that it is an ancient site where a wooden church may have been built before the first stone building of the 13th/14th century. The churchyard contains several Yew trees, one ancient. The grassland contains many species which indicate that the ground may have been undisturbed for centuries.

A close look at the south wall of the church, where the present entrance is located, shows that there may at one time have been an outdoor preaching platform. This could be attributable to the Augustinian monks who founded the Priory, as they were known to preach outdoors. On the north window are two unusual faces carved in stone. Much of the north and west of the church was rebuilt on 1870.

Inside it is mostly undecorated, with bare stone walls. There is a Victorian screen and pulpit (part of which is much older). The Victorian floor tiling remains in good condition. The font, dated 12th century, could have been a relic of the former Priory. This was not originally made as a font, but as a quern – a vessel for corn or liquid with a pouring lip on the edge of the rim.

In 1870–72, John Marius Wilson's Imperial Gazetteer of England and Wales described Snead like this:

'SNEAD, a parish in the district of Clun and county of Montgomery; 2 miles NNW of Bishops-Castle r[ailway]. station. Post town, Bishops-Castle, Shropshire. Acres, 644. Real property, £742. Pop[ulation]., 59. Houses, 10. The property is subdivided. The living is a rectory, annexed to Hyssington. The church is bad.'
