= Bruns =

Bruns is a surname, and may refer to:

- Anna Bruns (1937–2025), German politician
- Curt Bruns (1915–1945), German Wehrmacht captain and war criminal
- Dmitri Bruns (1929–2020), Estonian architect and architecture theorist
- Florian Bruns (born 1979), German footballer
- Franklin Richard Bruns Jr. (1912–1979), American philatelist
- George Bruns (1914–1983), American music composer
- Karl Bruns (fl. 1950s), German slalom canoeist
- Ludwig Bruns (1858–1916), German neurologist
- Maddux Bruns (born 2002), American baseball player
- Manfred Bruns (1934–2019), German gay civil rights activist
- Martin Bruns (1960–2026), Swiss baritone and academic
- Neville Bruns (born 1958), Australian footballer
- Paul von Bruns (1846–1916), German surgeon, son of Victor
- Phil Bruns (1931–2012), American television actor
- Roger Bruns (born 1941), American author and administrator
- Thomas Bruns (born 1992), Dutch football player
- Thomas Bruns (poet) (born 1976), German writer and poet
- Tissy Bruns (1951–2013), German journalist
- Victor Bruns (1904–1996), German composer and bassoonist
- Victor von Bruns (1812–1883), German surgeon, father of Paul

== See also ==
- Brun (disambiguation)
- Brunst
- The Brunswickan
- Burns (disambiguation)
