= Rorrington =

Village in Shropshire, England

Coordinates: 52.599°N 3.034°W

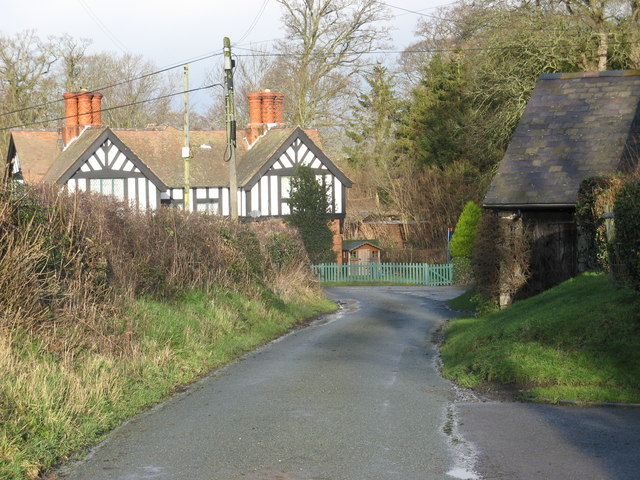
- Cottages in Rorrington

- Location within Shropshire
- OS grid reference: SJ299006
- Civil parish: Chirbury with Brompton
- Unitary authority: Shropshire
- Ceremonial county: Shropshire
- Region: West Midlands
- Country: England
- Sovereign state: United Kingdom
- Post town: MONTGOMERY
- Postcode district: SY15
- Dialling code: 01938
- Police: West Mercia
- Fire: Shropshire
- Ambulance: West Midlands
- UK Parliament: Ludlow

Rorrington is a hamlet in west Shropshire, England.

It is in the civil parish of Chirbury with Brompton. Four lanes lead into the hamlet: from Marton in the north, Meadowtown in the east, Middleton in the south, and Wotherton in the west.

National Cycle Route 44 passes through the hamlet.

== History ==
Rorrington's name is possibly derived from Old English personal name and could be translated as "the estate of Hror". As Roritune, it was recorded as a manor in the Domesday Book, when it was held jointly by Robert and Roger fitz Corbet.

There was once a holy well here, located on the hillside at Rorrington Green. In the mediaeval period it was a place of pilgrimage and there was a small chapel on the site, administered by the canons of St Michael's church in Chirbury and probably dedicated to the Virgin Mary. This may have been the Christianisation of an earlier tradition.

Until the 1830s, a "Halliwell Wakes" was held on Ascension Day, when villagers would process round the hillside, with music and dancing: pins were thrown in the well (dressed with green boughs, rushes and flowers) for good luck.

== See also ==
- Listed buildings in Chirbury with Brompton
