= Brunt =

Brunt is a surname. Notable people with the surname include:

- Chris Brunt, Northern Irish football player
- David Brunt, British meteorologist
- Dominic Brunt, English actor
- John Brunt, soldier in World War II who was posthumously awarded the Victoria Cross
  - John Brunt V.C. (public house), the pub that bears his name
- Jon Brunt (born 1974), American curler
- Katherine Brunt, English cricketer and 2006 England women's Cricketer of the Year
- Martin Brunt, crime correspondent for Sky News
- Maureen Brunt (1928–2019), Australian economist and professor
- Maureen Clark née Brunt, American Olympic curler
- Peter Brunt, ancient historian at Oxford University
- Stephen Brunt, Canadian sports journalist
- Tony Brunt (born 1947), New Zealand journalist, activist and politician.
- Van Brunt House, historic home in Miccosukee, Florida

Fictional characters:

- Abraham "Brom" van Brunt, fictional character in Washington Irving's short story The Legend of Sleepy Hollow
- Liquidator Brunt, character in Star Trek: Deep Space Nine
- Brunt, remote-controlled drone of the Transformer Trypticon

== See also ==
- Brunst
