= Brompton =

Brompton or The Brompton may refer to:

== Places ==
=== England ===
- Brompton, London, in the Royal Borough of Kensington and Chelsea
  - Brompton (ward), a former electoral ward in the borough
- West Brompton, an area in west London
- Brompton, Hambleton, a village near Northallerton, North Yorkshire
- Brompton, Kent, a suburb of Medway
- Brompton, Shropshire, a hamlet
- Brompton by Sawdon, North Yorkshire, a village
- Brompton-on-Swale, North Yorkshire, a village

=== Elsewhere ===
- Brompton, South Australia, a suburb in Adelaide
- Brompton, Quebec, a borough of Sherbrooke, in Canada
- Brompton (Fredericksburg, Virginia), an historic house in the United States

== Other uses ==
- Brompton Bicycle, manufacturer of folding bicycles
- Brompton cocktail, sometimes called Brompton mixture, an elixir for pain prophylaxis
- Brompton (surname), with a list of people of this name

== See also ==
- Saint-Denis-de-Brompton, a municipality in Canada
- Saint-François-Xavier-de-Brompton, a municipality in Canada
- Gillingham F.C., an English football club known as New Brompton F.C. until 1912
