= Brunst =

Brunst is a surname. Notable people with the surname include:

- Alexander Brunst (born 1995), German footballer
- Stanley Brunst (1894–1962), Canadian painter

== See also ==
- Bruns
- Brunt
