= Chirbury Rural District =

Former local government area in the UK

Coordinates: 52.549°N 3.112°W

Chirbury was a rural district in Shropshire, England, from 1894 to 1974.

It was created by the Local Government Act 1894 based on that part of the Montgomery rural sanitary district which was in Shropshire (and England), the Welsh part forming Forden Rural District in Montgomeryshire). It consisted of the three parishes of Brompton and Rhiston, Chirbury and Worthen.

It was abolished in 1934 under a County Review Order and merged into the Clun Rural District.

Since 1974 it has formed part of the South Shropshire district.
