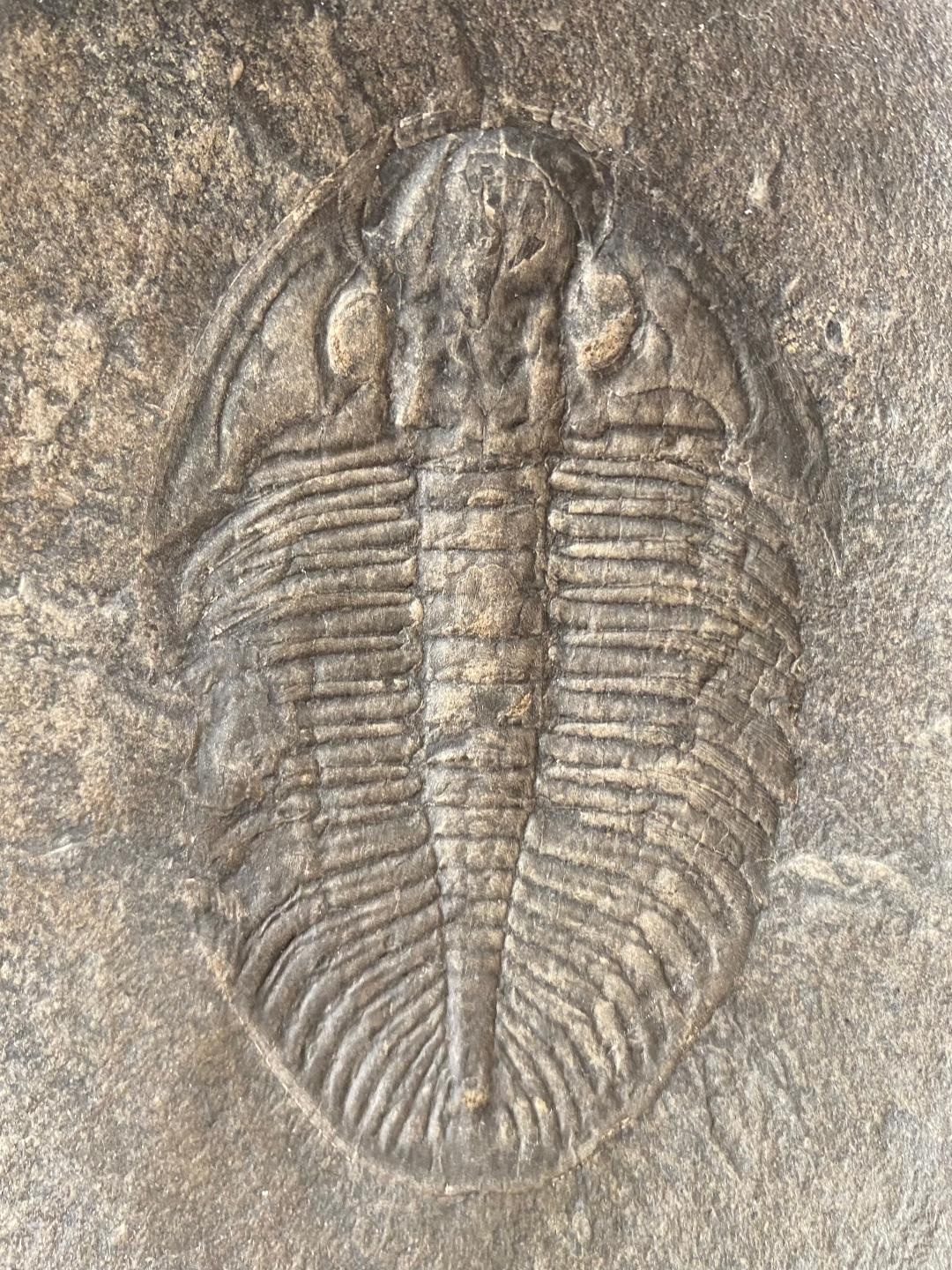
- Ogygiocarella debuchii (Brongniart, 1822), from the Meadowtown Formation, Llanvirn Series, Llandeilian Stage, Meadowtown, Shropshire. Length 8.5 cm.

Scientific classification
- Kingdom: Animalia
- Phylum: Arthropoda
- Clade: †Artiopoda
- Class: †Trilobita
- Order: †Asaphida
- Family: †Asaphidae
- Genus: †Ogygiocarella; Harrington & Leanza, 1957

Type species
- Asaphus debuchii

Species
- O. debuchii (Brongniart, 1822); O. angustissima (Salter, 1865) = Ogygites angustissima

= Ogygiocarella =

Ogygiocarella Temporal range: Middle Ordovician

Extinct genus of trilobites

Ogygiocarella Harrington and Leanza, 1957, is a genus of asaphid trilobites that lived during the Middle Ordovician Period.

== Etymology ==
The generic name, Ogygiocarella, refers to "Ogygia", the seventh daughter of Amphion and Niobe, which name is combined with "-care-", from the Greek "akares", meaning short, and finally "-ella", the diminutive form.

== History ==
The first written record of a trilobite was by Edward Lhuyd (then-curator of the Ashmolean Museum, Oxford) in a letter written (1698) to Dr. Martin Lister and published (1699) in his Lithophylacii Britannici Ichnographia. The letter was accompanied by a page of etchings of fossils, one of which was found by him near Llandeilo, probably on the grounds of Lord Dynefor's Castle. One etching (the 15th) figured a fossil described as the "… Sceleton [sic] of some Flat-Fish …" . and is sufficiently detailed to be now identified as the trilobite Ogygiocarella debuchii.

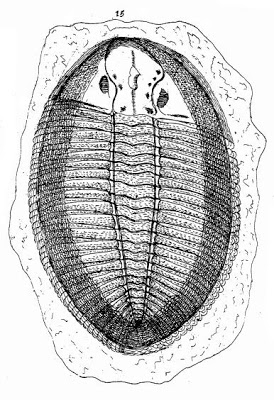
Etching of O. debuchii by Rev. Edward Lhwyd, made in 1698

== Type species ==
Asaphus debuchii Brongniart (1822, pp. 20, 143, pl. ii, fig. 2A).

Whittard (1964, pp. 255-6) wrote: "Harrington and Leanza (1957, pp. 160-1) state that Asaphus debuchianus is the type species which was described and figured by Brongniart (1822); the specific name in this form was not used by Brongniart in the 1822 publication, but he used A. debuchii instead". The somewhat confused nomenclatorial history regarding the type species of Ogygiocarella was further discussed and clarified by Whittard (op. cit.).

== Distribution ==
The genus Ogygiocarella presently appears to be confined to Wales and Shropshire, England, first occurring in the Lower Llandeilian Stage as developed at Llandeilo in Wales and disappearing in the lowest Caradoc Series graptolite zone of Nemagraptus gracilis in Shropshire (Whittard, 1964, PP. 256-7).

Only two almost identical species of Ogygiocarella are currently recognized, namely O. debuchii and O, angustissima and differentiation of the two relies on the presence and preservation of their pygidia.

O. debuchii (Brongniart) is the most common trilobite species to occur within the Ordovician Shelve inlier, Shropshire, appearing in the middle part of the Meadowtown Formation (Llanvirn Series/Llandeilian Stage – Glyptograptus teretiusculus Zone) and persisting into the overlying Rorrington Shale Formation (Nemagraptus gracilis Zone) where it is much less abundant. The species is characterised by eleven pairs of pygidial pleural ribs, although a twelfth vestigial pair is sometimes evident.

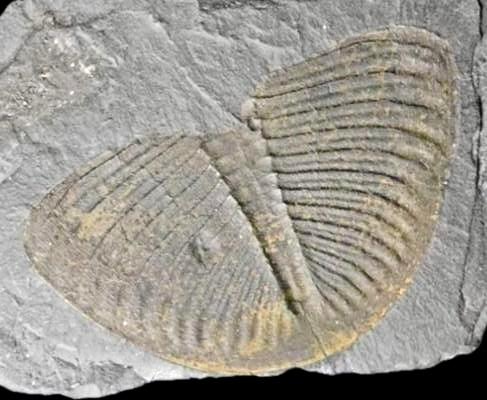
Pygidium of O. angustissima (Salter), from the Caradoc Series of Ridgebourne, Llandrindod Wells, Powys, Wales. Large external mould showing thirteen rib count. - 102mm x 56mm.

O. angustissima (Salter), on the other hand, is actually rare In Shropshire and confined to the upper part of the Meadowtown Formation (teretiusculus Zone). Within the Builth-Llandrinod inlier of mid-Wales, however, the species occurs slightly higher stratigraphically and is commonly associated with Nemagraptus gracilis within the lowest Caradoc Series. O. angustissima, differs from O. debuchii in having mainly thirteen instead of eleven ribs in the pygidium, and with a fourteenth pair faintly indicated in some specimens.

Ogygiocarella cf. angustissima (Salter) is recorded from the Caerhys Shale Formation (Llandeilian – teretiusculus Zone) in the main part of Porth Gain Slate Quarry, Abereiddy Bay, Pembrokeshire, Southwest Wales.

== Description ==
Ogygiocarella has a very flat calcified dorsal exoskeleton, with an oval outline (about 1½× longer than wide). The headshield (or cephalon) is 2½× wider than long, and of equal size as the tailshield (or pygidium), a state called isopygeous. Both are semicircular. The backcorners of the cephalon end in so-called genal spines that stick backwards approximately to the 6th thorax segment. The central raised area of the cephalon (or glabella) has 4 pairs of furrows and expands in front of the eyes. The eyes are small, close to the glabella and in the rear half of the cephalon. The dorsal facial sutures, that split when moulding, arch from the front of the eye and pass in front of the glabella. The suture follows the top of the visual surface, as in all trilobites, and from there cut backwards and outwards at approximately 45° to reach the posterior margin of the cephalon approximately halfway between the glabella and the lateral border. As usual for members of the family Asaphidae, it has 8 articulating segments in the middle part of the body (or thorax). The axis is about half as wide as the ribs (or pleurae) to each of the sides. In the thorax the axis tapers slightly towards the back. In the pygidium the axis tapers stronger and terminates a short distance from the margin in a roundish endpiece. It has 10-14 ribs on each side of the axis, which fade-out in the border that is as wide as the axis.
