= Brompton (surname) =

The name Brompton is today mainly associated with locations and businesses, and less so as an actual surname. Given the large number of places with the name, it is oddly surprising that it is so uncommon to come across a "Brompton."

Examples of place names include Potter Brompton in North Yorkshire (historically the East Riding of Yorkshire), Patrick Brompton, Brompton-on-Swale, as well as just Brompton on its own, all in North Yorkshire, Brompton Ralph in Somerset, and Brompton in Middlesex and Shropshire.

Brompton can be traced back to the 7th century phrase "Brom-ton," meaning "Broom Village," which seems to suggest that Brompton originated as a placename, before it became a surname. The earliest example of Brompton used as a surname was found in the Pipe Rolls of Yorkshire in the year 1205, which mentions Geoffry de Brunton. After this entry, another example is found over a hundred years later in the Devonshire County Letter Books for 1312, a William de Bromptone.

== Notable people ==
People with the surname Brompton include:

- John Brompton, 15th century English chronicler
- Richard Brompton, 18th century portrait painter
