= Pentreheyling =

Hamlet in Shropshire, England

Coordinates: 52.529°N 3.117°W

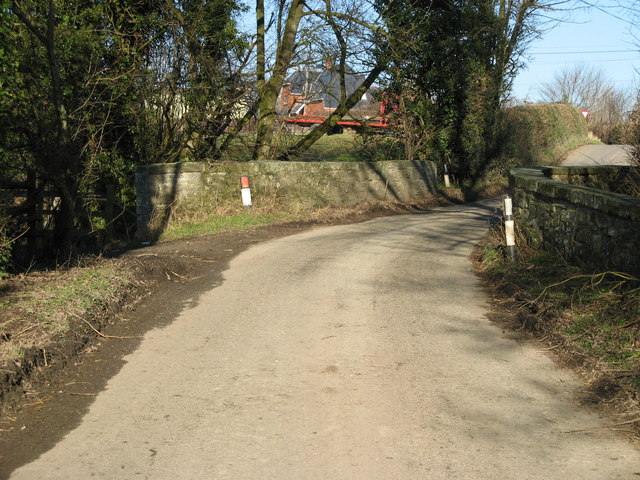
- Bridge over the River Caebrita into the hamlet of Pentreheyling

- Location within Shropshire
- OS grid reference: SO242929
- Civil parish: Chirbury with Brompton
- Unitary authority: Shropshire
- Ceremonial county: Shropshire
- Region: West Midlands
- Country: England
- Sovereign state: United Kingdom
- Post town: MONTGOMERY
- Postcode district: SY15
- Dialling code: 01588
- Police: West Mercia
- Fire: Shropshire
- Ambulance: West Midlands
- UK Parliament: Ludlow

Pentreheyling is a hamlet in Shropshire, England. It lies just west of Brompton on the A489 between Church Stoke and Newtown. The hamlet is notable for the fact that it is impossible to reach any other settlement in England (except Brompton) by road without first passing through Wales. Public footpaths are the only access which links it with the rest of England. It is however not geographically an exclave.

Pentreheyling is in the civil parish of Chirbury with Brompton; formerly in the parish of Brompton and Rhiston.

The remains of a Roman fort have been discovered in the hamlet.

== See also ==
- Listed buildings in Chirbury with Brompton
