= Meadowtown =

Coordinates: 52.604°N 3.018°W

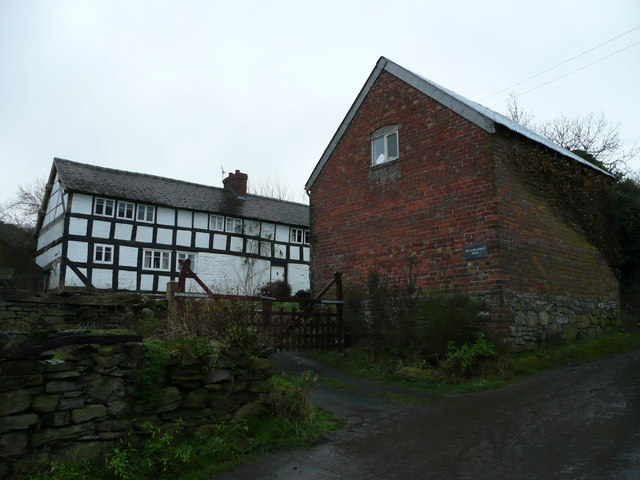
- Meadowtown Hall

- Location within Shropshire
- OS grid reference: SJ310012
- Civil parish: Worthen with Shelve
- Unitary authority: Shropshire
- Ceremonial county: Shropshire
- Region: West Midlands
- Country: England
- Sovereign state: United Kingdom
- Post town: SHREWSBURY
- Postcode district: SY5
- Dialling code: 01743
- Police: West Mercia
- Fire: Shropshire
- Ambulance: West Midlands
- UK Parliament: Ludlow

Meadowtown is a hamlet in west Shropshire, England, in the civil parish of Worthen with Shelve. Neighbouring hamlets include Marton, Ox Wood, Crest Wood, and Rorrington.

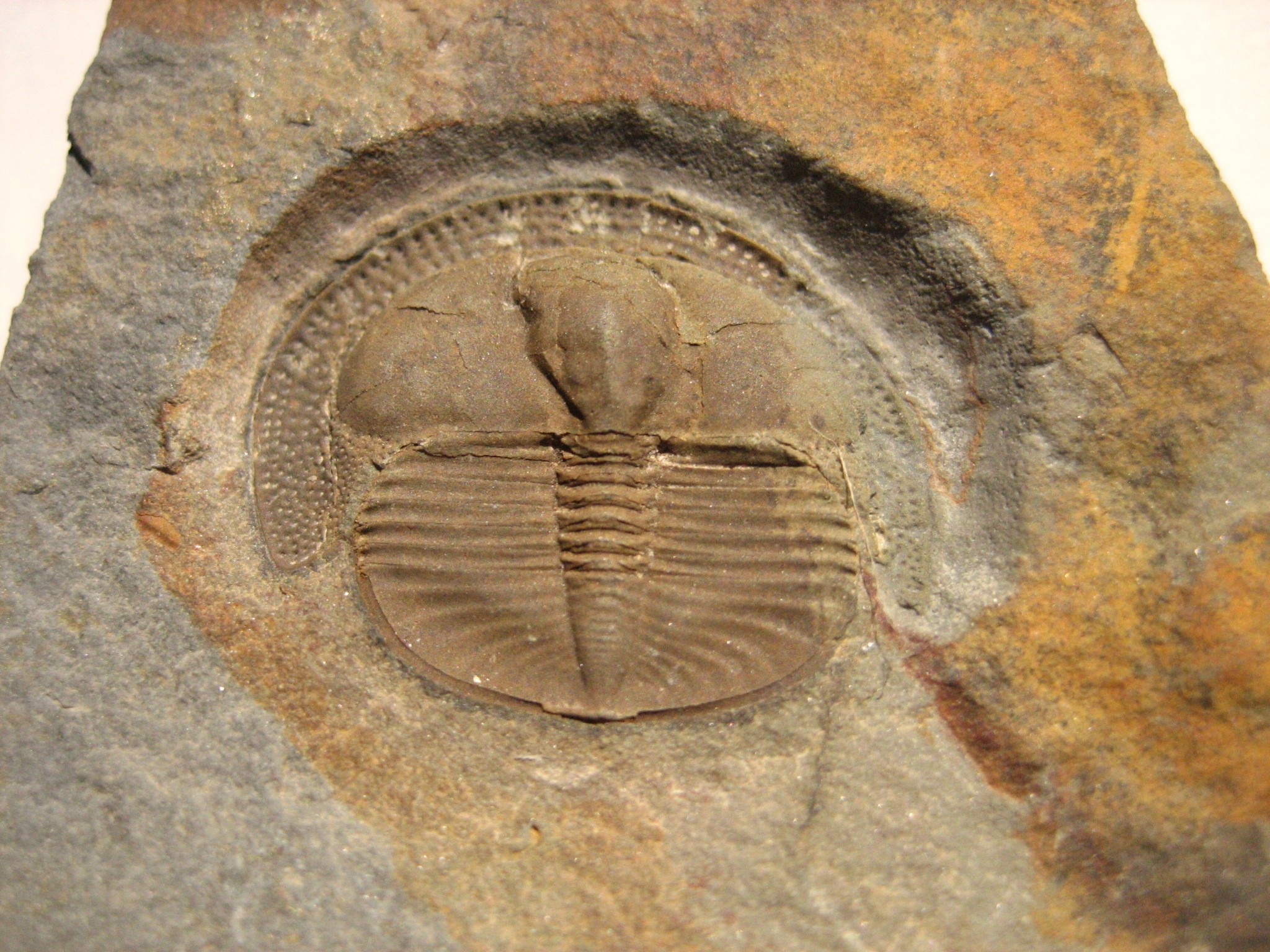
Lloydolithus lloydi from Meadowtown

Meadowtown contains a Site of Special Scientific Interest according to the U.K. government. A long-disused quarry in the hamlet is "a well known fossil collecting locality and has yielded typical and distinctive trilobites including Oxygiocarella debuchi, Marrolithus craticulatus, Lloydolithus lloydii and Oxyginus cordensis novenarius. Species of the brachiopod genus Dalmanella and occasional sponge spicules also occur."

Meadowtown is also home to "Mammoth", a cow made famous on the internet involving a UK milk-price dispute in 2017.
