= Stockton, Chirbury with Brompton =

Hamlet in Shropshire, England

Coordinates: 52.603°N 3.085°W

Stockton
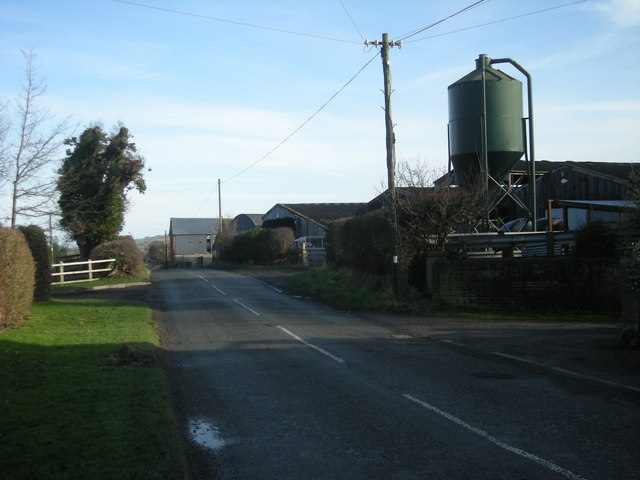
- The road through Stockton, west Shropshire

- Location within Shropshire
- OS grid reference: SJ265011
- Civil parish: Chirbury with Brompton
- Unitary authority: Shropshire
- Ceremonial county: Shropshire
- Region: West Midlands
- Country: England
- Sovereign state: United Kingdom
- Post town: WELSHPOOL
- Postcode district: SY21
- Dialling code: 01938
- Police: West Mercia
- Fire: Shropshire
- Ambulance: West Midlands
- UK Parliament: Ludlow

Stockton is a hamlet in Shropshire, England.

It forms part of the civil parish of Chirbury with Brompton and is just on the English side of the Wales-England border. The River Camlad flows to the south and there was once a mill (Stockton Mill). The elevation of the hamlet is 102 metres (335 ft) above sea level.

== See also ==
- Listed buildings in Chirbury with Brompton
