= Chirbury =

Village in Shropshire, England

Coordinates: 52.5784°N 3.0919°W

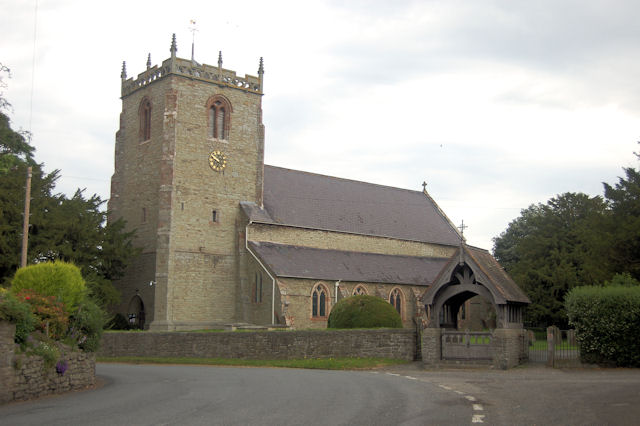
- St Michael's church, Chirbury

- Location within Shropshire
- Population: 971 (2011 census)
- OS grid reference: SO26159834
  - London: 174 mi (280 km)
- Civil parish: Chirbury with Brompton
- Unitary authority: Shropshire
- Ceremonial county: Shropshire
- Region: West Midlands
- Country: England
- Sovereign state: United Kingdom
- Post town: MONTGOMERY
- Postcode district: SY15
- Dialling code: 01938
- Police: West Mercia
- Fire: Shropshire
- Ambulance: West Midlands
- UK Parliament: South Shropshire

Chirbury (/ˈtʃɜːrbʌri/) is a village and former civil parish, now in the parish of Chirbury with Brompton, in the Shropshire district, in west Shropshire, England. It is situated in the Vale of Montgomery, close to the Wales–England border (1.1 miles (1.8 km) at its nearest), which is to its north, west and south. The A490 and B4386 routes cross at Chirbury.

It is the largest settlement in the Chirbury with Brompton civil parish, which according to the 2001 census had a population of 914, with the resident population of Chirbury at 348. The population of the civil parish had increased to 971 at the 2011 census.

== Etymology ==
The placename was recorded in 915 as Ċyriċbyrig in the Anglo-Saxon Chronicle, and as Ċireberie in the Domesday Book of 1086, and means "the fort with a church". Its Welsh name, Llanffynhonwen, means "the church of the white well" or "...of the holy well". Some French linguists have theorised that the name of Chirbury shares a common etymology with the city of Cherbourg (Chiersburg, Chierisburch around 1070, Chirburg 1377, Chirburgh 14th century).

== History ==
The 8th-century Offa's Dyke runs to the west of the village and marked the frontier of the Mercian kingdom. Even today, a lengthy section of the dyke to the southwest of the village forms the English border with Wales. An Anglo-Saxon fort, built in 915 by Æthelflæd, Lady of the Mercians, was located just outside the village on what is now the Montgomery Road. The field that the earthworks are in has long been called Castle Field or King's Orchard.

Chirbury was once a hundred, formed out of an earlier, and larger, hundred (of which Chirbury was the chief settlement) called Witentreu or Wittery (a placename that continues to this day in Whittery Wood, near to the village) which included places now in Wales. Later Chirbury was a rural district (from 1894 to 1934) — the Chirbury Rural District. The hundred included a detached township near Clun, Guilden Down. On 1 April 1987 the parishes of Chirbury and Brompton and Rhiston merged to form the present-day civil parish of "Chirbury with Brompton". Historically Cherbury was the more usual spelling of Chirbury.

Mitchell's Fold and Hoarstones stone circles lie within the parish.

=== Church and Priory ===
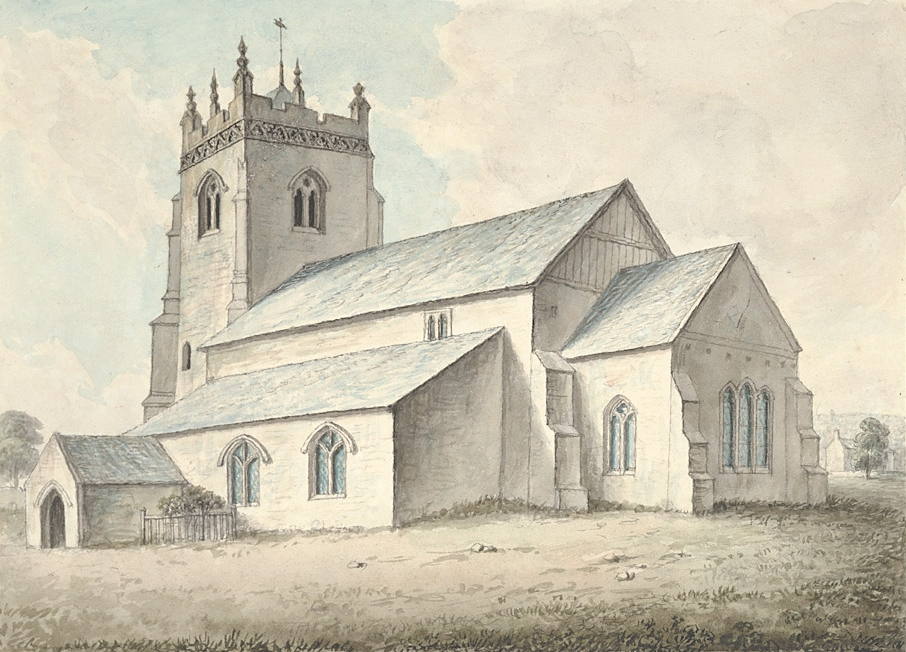
Chirbury church in 1795

St Michael's Church, as pictured in the infobox above, is the only church in Chirbury, and is dedicated to Saint Michael the Archangel. It is Church of England (Diocese of Hereford) and the Chirbury ecclesiastical parish covers a smaller area than the civil parish, including Wotherton, but not Brompton, Marton or Middleton.

Originally an Anglo-Saxon church, founded in 915 (with the building of the fort) or possibly earlier, the current building largely dates to the late 12th century with the tower constructed around 1300, and a short chancel added in 1733. The church was restored in 1871–72 by Edward Haycock junior. The tower and body of the church are constructed in limestone rubble with pink sandstone ashlar dressings and slate roofs; the chancel is in red brick with a tiled roof. The church was reformed into the priory church of the Augustinian Chirbury Priory upon the moving of the order from nearby Snead by 1227. With the dissolution of the priory in 1535 St Michael's became a parish church once again. The church building is a Grade I Listed building. Remnants of the former priory can be seen in the churchyard and some stonework was also incorporated into the adjacent Chirbury Hall.

=== Conservation area ===
The centre of Chirbury is a conservation area, which includes Chirbury Hall, St Michael's Church, The Herbert Arms, Chirbury Primary School and the Parish Hall. Most of the village's buildings are either of a red brick or limestone construction, or a combination.

== Amenities ==
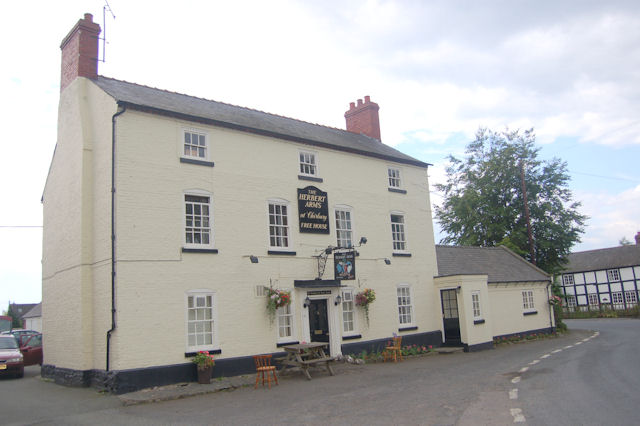
The Herbert Arms in the village.

In the village is a village hall (the Parish Hall), a large public house called The Herbert Arms, and a post office, open Monday to Friday, which is also the village shop.

The Herbert Arms is named for the Barons Herbert of Chirbury and historically was a coaching inn, sometimes called the Herbert Arms Hotel (though it no longer is a hotel). Built in the 18th century in red brick (painted white) it was originally called The Cross, and is Grade II Listed.

The village has a primary school (see Education) and a nursery school ('Busy Bees'). There is a bowls club with its own bowling green in the village.

== Geography ==
The village is situated 2 1/2 miles (4.0 km) east of Montgomery and 8 1/2 miles (13.7 km) northwest of Bishop's Castle, with Shrewsbury, the county town, 18 miles (29 km) away to the northeast.

The civil parish of Chirbury with Brompton covers 5,311 hectares (13,120 acres) and includes a number of other (smaller) settlements, including:

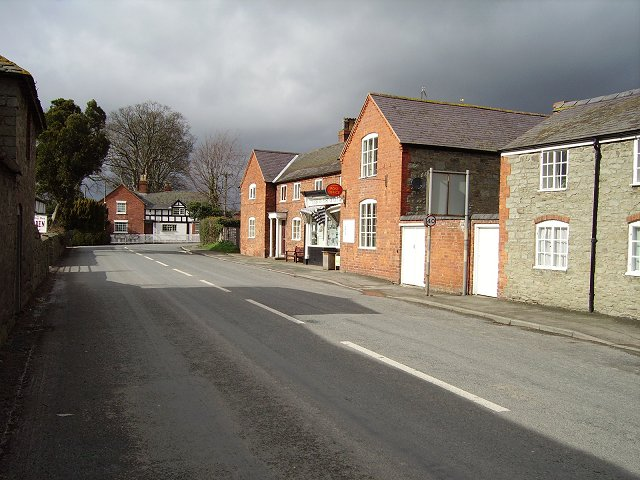
The centre of the village with its post office. The road here is the A490 and B4386 combined.

- Brompton
- Marton
- Middleton
- Pentreheyling
- Priestweston
- Rorrington
- Stockton
- Wotherton.

It is not possible to reach Brompton or Pentreheyling by a public road without passing through Wales; they are however not true exclaves and can be reached (without going through Wales) by public footpaths.

The eastern part of the parish falls within the Shropshire Hills AONB.

Through the parish flows the River Camlad, which flows first to the east and then to the north of the village, on its way from Church Stoke (in the south) to its confluence with the River Severn (in the northwest).

The centre of the village is at an elevation of 109 metres (358 ft). The highest point in the parish is Stapeley Hill, which rises to 403 metres (1,322 ft), whilst the lowest point is where the Camlad exits the parish, at 80 metres (260 ft).

Agriculture in the vicinity is mainly arable nearer the village, with pasture further away in the more upland terrain. There are a number of tall grain silos in the area.

=== Transport ===
Roads and lanes from six directions converge on the village, with the A490 (Churchstoke – Welshpool road) and the B4386 (Shrewsbury – Montgomery road) combining as they pass through the centre of the village. One of the lanes leads to Priestweston and Middleton, the other lane to Rhiston.

The nearest train station to Chirbury is Welshpool, which is 7 miles (11 km) away. From Welshpool, trains run both west to Aberystwyth and the Cambrian Coast, and east to Shrewsbury and the West Midlands. The Bishops Castle Railway originally was planned to run through the parish, as a Craven Arms to Montgomery railway, but was only constructed as far as Lydham.

Buses run (Monday to Saturday) between Shrewsbury and Montgomery (service 558), and between Welshpool and Newtown via Montgomery (service 81), with both services calling at Chirbury.

Welshpool Airport is 4 1/2 miles (7.2 km) northwest of Chirbury on the A490.

National Cycle Route 44 passes through the parish, though not Chirbury itself.

== Education ==
Chirbury C. of E. Primary School was founded in 1675 by Reverend Edward Lewis and is a primary school with around 70 pupils. On the dissolution of Chirbury Priory, the school building was signed over by King Henry VIII and this original building is currently managed by the Edward Lewis Trust. The school is now administrated jointly with another rural primary school at Stiperstones. In June 2006, the school was awarded the "Green" Travel Plan Award and currently holds status as an eco-school at Bronze level working towards their Silver.

After leaving Chirbury Primary School, pupils transfer into a Shropshire secondary school, with most continuing to Bishop's Castle Community College.

== Notable people ==
- Ludovic Lloyd (fl 1573–1610), poet and courtier, son of manor lord of Marrington, Chirbury.
- Sir Edward Herbert, poet, philosopher, diplomat and soldier, was created Baron Herbert of Cherbury after the village in 1629.
- Thomas Bray, founder of Society for the Propagation of Christian Knowledge, born at Marton then in Chirbury parish, and has memorial plaque erected in 1901 in Chirbury church, where he was baptised on 2 May 1658.
- Major-General Llewelyn Price-Davies, Boer War Victoria Cross recipient, was born member of family seated at Marrington Hall, Chirbury, 1878.
- Bert Trentham, professional footballer notably for West Bromwich Albion, born at Chirbury 1908 and schooled there.
- John Brunt, World War II Victoria Cross recipient, born at Priest Weston in the Chirbury parish 1922, began schooling in Chirbury.
- George Herbert, 7th Earl of Powis, peer, lived at Marrington Hall before succeeding to the family Earldom.

== Population ==
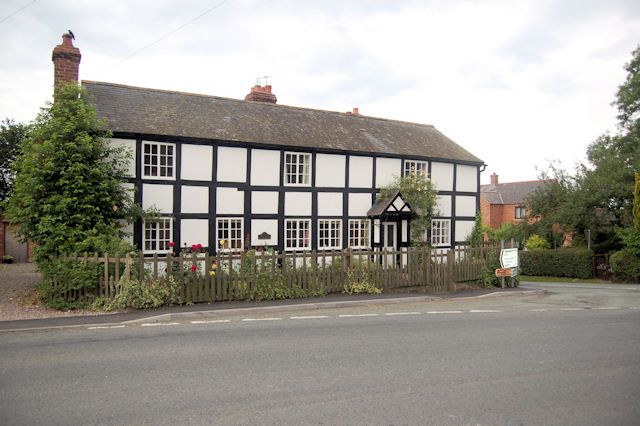
Historic black-and-white cottages at the junction with the road to Montgomery.

In 1961 the parish of Chirbury had a population of 818. At the time of the 2001 census, Chirbury with Brompton had a population of 914, of which 467 were male and 447 female. Chirbury with Brompton contained a total of 348 households at this census.

The population density of Chirbury with Brompton at the 2001 census was recorded at 0.17 people per hectare. This is considerably below the Shropshire Council area average of 0.89 per hectare and dramatically below the English average of 3.77 per hectare.

== Parish council ==
The parish council of Chirbury with Brompton has 13 councillors. The civil parish is subdivided into four parish wards, based on the ecclesiastical parishes, and each returning a set number of councillors: Brompton and Rhiston (2), Chirbury (5), Marton (3), and Middleton (3). The latter three wards are the same as in the former civil parish of Chirbury, whilst Brompton and Rhiston ward is the former civil parish of that name. The two parishes merged in 1987.

== See also ==
- Listed buildings in Chirbury with Brompton

== Sources ==
- Newman, John; Pevsner, Nikolaus (2006), Shropshire, The Buildings of England, New Haven and London: Yale University Press, ISBN 0-300-12083-4
