= Listed buildings in Chirbury with Brompton =

Chirbury with Brompton is a civil parish in Shropshire, England. It contains 80 listed buildings that are recorded in the National Heritage List for England. Of these, two are listed at Grade I, the highest of the three grades, four are at Grade II*, the middle grade, and the others are at Grade II, the lowest grade. The parish contains villages and smaller settlements, including Chirbury, Brompton, Middleton, Marton, Pentreheyling, Priest Weston, Rorrington, Stockton, and Wotherton, and is otherwise completely rural. Most of the listed buildings are houses, cottages, farmhouses, farm buildings and associated structures, mainly of which are timber framed, or which have a timber-framed core, and which date from the 15th to the late 17th century. The other listed buildings include churches and items in the churchyards, a public house, a former mill, a bridge, three milestones, a pump, and two war memorials.

== Key ==
Grade	Criteria
I	Buildings of exceptional interest, sometimes considered to be internationally important
II*	Particularly important buildings of more than special interest
II	Buildings of national importance and special interest

== Buildings ==
Name and location	Photograph	Date	Notes	Grade
St Michael's Church, Chirbury; 52.57939°N 3.09151°W		Late 12th century	Originally a monastic church, the aisles were added in the 13th century, the west tower in about 1300, the chancel in 1733, the porch and vestry in 1848, and the church was restored in 1871–72. Most of the church is in limestone with sandstone dressings and slate roofs, and the chancel is in brick on a stone plinth, with a tile roof. The tower has three stages, diagonal buttresses, a parapet with open arches and intermediate and corner crocketed pinnacles, and a pyramidal roof with a brass weathercock.	I
Remains of compound pier 52.57969°N 3.09132°W	—	Late 13th century	The pier has survived from the monastic church. It is in red sandstone, and is about 1.2 metres (3 ft 11 in) high. The pier has an octagonal core, slim triple shafts, and a moulded base.	I
Old Smithy; 52.56951°N 3.04733°W	—	14th or 15th century (probable)	A farmhouse, later a private house, it was remodelled in the 17th and 18th centuries, and later altered and extended. It is in limestone, partly rendered, with a slate roof. The building has two storeys and three bays, and the windows are casements. Inside are cruck trusses, and two inglenook fireplaces.	II
Rorrington Hall; 52.59967°N 3.03740°W		Late 15th century	A farmhouse that was remodelled in about 1600, and altered and extended in the 18th and 19th centuries. It is timber framed with plaster infill, the extensions are in brick painted to resemble timber framing, and the roofs are slated. There are two storeys and attics. The farmhouse has a complex plan, and the features include gables with bargeboards and pointed finials. The windows are replacement casements.	II
Kinton Farmhouse; 52.58776°N 3.05078°W	—	Late 15th or early 16th century (probable)	The farmhouse was extended about a century later. It is in roughcast timber framing on a limestone plinth, and has a tile roof. The farmhouse has a T-shaped plan, consisting of a hall range of 3½ bays, and a cross-wing of two bays. The hall range has one storey and an attic, and the cross-wing has two storeys and a cellar. In the angle between the hall range and the cross-wing at the rear is a timber framed range with a weatherboarded gable, and at the rear is a 19th-century stone range and an outshut. The windows are 20th-century casements, and there is a gabled dormer. The entrance has a gabled porch and a doorway with a pediment.	II
The Tin House; 52.57020°N 3.04755°W	—	Late 15th or early 16th century	The house was remodelled and extended in the 19th century. The original part is timber framed with rendered infill on a stone plinth, partly weatherboarded, the extension to the left is in brick with the gable wall in limestone, and the roof is slated. There are two storeys and an attic, the windows in the original part are mullioned, and in the late part are casements.	II
Marrington Hall; 52.57061°N 3.07585°W	—	16th century	A small country house that was considerably extended in about 1877, retaining the 16th-century three-bay core at the front. The core is timber framed, and the extensions are in timber framing with plaster infill and brick painted to resemble timber framing. The roof is slated, there are two storeys, and the front has eight bays with four full-height gabled bay windows. In the original part is a moulded bressumer. Some windows are mullioned and transomed, and others are cross-windows.	II
Dovecote, Chirbury Hall; 52.58012°N 3.09070°W	—	Late 16th century (probable)	The dovecote is built in small red bricks, it has an octagonal plan, and a slate roof with an open-sided lantern and a wooden finial. The eaves project slightly and have moulded corbels. There are chamfered rectangular windows with hood moulds, and a segmental-headed doorway. Inside are nesting holes and ledges, and a carved central post. The dovecote is also a Scheduled Monument.	II*
Lower Ridge Farmhouse; 52.57887°N 3.05746°W	—	Late 16th century	The farmhouse was extended in the 17th century and later altered. It is timber framed with plaster and brick infill, stone in the gable ends, and has a slate roof. It has four bays, the right two bays have one storey and an attic, and the left two bays have two storeys. The windows are all 20th-century casements, and inside is an inglenook fireplace.	II
Mill Cottage; 52.62340°N 3.05727°W	—	Late 16th century	The cottage is timber framed with plaster infill and a slate roof. It has one storey and an attic, and two bays. There is a gabled timber porch with a casement window to the left, a mullioned window to the right, and a gabled eaves dormer. Inside is an inglenook fireplace.	II
Rhiston Farmhouse; 52.54908°N 3.09378°W	—	Late 16th century	A farmhouse, later a private house, it was extended in about 1786, and both parts have slate roofs. The original part is timber framed on a high red brick plinth, with two storeys and an attic, three bays, casement windows, two raked dormers, and a later gabled porch. The extension at right angles to the rear on the right is in red brick with canted sides, a dentil eaves cornice, two storeys and a cellar, and windows with segmental heads. Inside is a large inglenook fireplace.	II
Sundial; 52.57159°N 3.08306°W	—	1595	The sundial is in the garden of Marrington Lodge, having been moved from Marrington Hall. It is in limestone, and consists of a square pillar on a chamfered square base. On each side of the pillar are carvings of figures and emblems, and the mottoes and arms of the Lloyd family of Marrington Hall.	II*
Granary, Heightley Farm; 52.58187°N 3.07735°W	—	c. 1600	Originally a house, later a granary, it is timber framed and weatherboarded, with brick infill and a slate roof. There are two storeys and three bays. It is open to the front and has two elaborately carved posts, and inside is an oak staircase. In the upper floor are two hatches, and the doorway has a moulded surround.	II
Moat Farmhouse; 52.56447°N 3.11149°W	—	Late 16th or 17th century (probable)	The farmhouse was extended in the 19th century. The original part is timber framed, partly encased and partly rebuilt in brick and stone, and the roof is partly slated and partly tiled. The farmhouse has an L-shaped plan, with the 19th-century stone extension to the northeast, and with two brick lean-tos. There are two storeys and an attic. Most of the windows are casements, in the ground floor with segmental heads, and above the door is a rectangular fanlight.	II
Marton Hall Farmhouse; 52.61714°N 3.05115°W	—	Early 17th century	The farmhouse was extended in the 19th century. The original part is timber framed with plaster infill on a high rendered plinth, the extensions are in roughcast brick, and the roofs are slated. The original part consists of a hall range with a cross-wing to the west, and the extension is a parallel cross-wing to the south. There are two storeys, most of the windows are casements, there are two sash windows, and at the entrance is a gabled timber porch.	II
Rockley Farmhouse; 52.54397°N 3.10519°W	—	Early 17th century	The farmhouse is n red brick on a chamfered plinth, and has a tile roof. There are two storeys and attics, and a U-shaped plan, consisting of a central two-bay range and flanking gabled cross-wings. In the left corner is a lean-to porch containing benches, and the doorway has a moulded surround. Most of the windows are replacement casements. At the rear is a gabled stair projection.	II*
The Lack; 52.53762°N 3.08490°W		Early 17th century	The farmhouse is timber framed with plaster and brick infill, and has a slate roof. There are two storeys and three bays, with an additional bay to the left in brick painted to resemble timber framing. The upper floor is jettied with a richly moulded bressumer, and the gable end is further jettied. The windows are casements.	II*
Yew Tree Cottage; 52.61651°N 3.05134°W	—	1634	The cottage is timber framed with brick infill and a slate roof, and was partly rebuilt in brick in the 20th century. It has one storey and an attic, and three bays. The windows are casements, and there are two flat-roofed eaves dormers.	II
24 Rorrington; 52.59838°N 3.03466°W	—	Mid 17th century	A timber framed cottage with plaster and brick infill, partly rebuilt in brick, and it has a slate roof. There is one storey and an attic, three or four bays, a timber framed outshut at the rear to the right, a stone lean-to on the left, and a later single-storey extension on the right. It has a gabled porch, casement windows, and an eaves dormer.	II
Brompton Hall; 52.53302°N 3.10684°W	—	17th century (probable)	A farmhouse incorporating earlier material that was remodelled in the 18th century and extended in the late 19th century. The earlier part is roughcast at the front, possibly on timber framing, in stone at the rear, it has two storeys, three bays, and a gable. The later part to the right is in red brick, and has two storeys and an attic. There are two gabled bays with a two-storey canted bay window between. Both parts have slate roofs and casement windows.	II
Calcot Farmhouse; 52.55631°N 3.07309°W	—	17th century	A timber framed farmhouse that was refronted in red brick in the 19th century. It has a dentilled eaves cornice, a slate roof, two storeys, a front of three bays, and a rear stone range. There is a central gabled porch, and the windows are casements.	II
Cottage at SJ 2656 0197; 52.61056°N 3.08597°W	—	Mid 17th century	The cottage is timber framed with red brick infill, the left gable end is in shale with red brick dressings, and it has a slate roof. There is one storey with an attic, and two bays. The windows are casements, and there are two gabled dormers.	II
Barn, The Ditches Farm; 52.53823°N 3.10941°W	—	17th century	The barn is timber framed and weatherboarded, with limestone in the right gable end, brick in the left gable end, and a corrugated iron roof. It has two levels, and contains double doors, stable doors, and eaves hatches.	II
Barn, Lower Aldress Farm; 52.56371°N 3.05847°W	—	17th century	The barn is timber framed and weatherboarded and partly clad in corrugated iron, with limestone in the left gable end, and a slate roof. There are two levels, four eaves hatches, and three doors.	II
Manor Farmhouse; 52.61614°N 3.05361°W		17th century	The farmhouse is timber framed with plaster and brick infill, and a slate roof. There are two storeys, and an L-shaped plan, with a three-bay hall range and a projecting cross-wing on the left. The windows are 20th-century casements, and the doorway has pilasters and a hood.	II
Oaklee; 52.57865°N 3.09231°W		17th century	A house, later remodelled and extended, and divided into two dwellings. It is timber framed with plaster and brick infill, and has a slate roof. There are two storeys, four bays, and two later gabled extensions at the rear that are timber framed with brick infill. The windows are multi-paned casements.	II
Pentrehyling Farmhouse; 52.52953°N 3.11702°W	—	Mid 17th century	The farmhouse was extended in the 19th century. The original part is timber framed, mainly roughcast, and has a slate roof. There are two storeys and three bays, casement windows, and an open gabled porch. At the rear are two parallel brick gabled extensions.	II
Barn, Rockley Farm; 52.54375°N 3.10485°W	—	17th century	The barn is timber framed and weatherboarded on a limestone plinth with a weatherboarded gabled projection, and it has a slate roof. There are two levels, and it contains eaves hatches and stable doors on both fronts.	II
Outbuilding near School House; 52.57970°N 3.09046°W	—	17th century	Originally a cottage, it was extended by one bay to the right in the 18th century, and has since been used for other purposes. It is timber framed with brick infill and a slate roof, and the right gable end is in red brick. There is one storey and three bays.	II
Steps Farmhouse; 52.61648°N 3.05320°W	—	17th century (probable)	The farmhouse, later divided into two dwellings, is roughcast, probably with a timber framed core, on a limestone plinth, and has a slate roof. There is an L-shaped plan, the left part with one storey and an attic, and the right part with two storeys and a basement. The windows vary, and include horizontally-sliding sash windows, a gabled eaves dormer, and a bow window.	II
The Ridge Farmhouse; 52.57518°N 3.06288°W	—	17th century	The farmhouse was remodelled in the 18th century and extended in the 19th century. It is timber framed with brick infill, it is in stone in the gable ends and in the extension, and has a slate roof. There are two storeys, the windows are casements, and there is a 19th-century gabled brick porch.	II
Timberth Farmhouse; 52.56167°N 3.10476°W	—	17th century	The farmhouse was remodelled in the 18th century and extended in the 19th century. It is timber framed and largely encased or rebuilt in red brick, and has a slate roof. There is a T-shaped plan, consisting of a long hall range, and a cross-wing to the right, and there is a later rear wing on the left. The hall range has a dentil eaves cornice, and there is a porch in the angle between the hall and the wing. The windows are casements, those in the ground floor of the hall range and in both floors of the cross-wing having segmental heads.	II
Cottage near West Dudston Farmhouse; 52.56909°N 3.11770°W	—	Mid 17th century	The cottage is timber framed and weatherboarded with red brick and plaster infill, the right gable end has been rebuilt in red brick, and there is a slate roof. It has one storey and an attic and two bays, and there are two raking eaves dormers. Inside is an inglenook fireplace.	II
Wotherton Farmhouse; 52.59735°N 3.06082°W	—	17th century (probable)	The farmhouse was extended in the 19th century by the addition of a wing at right angles at the rear on the left. The original range is roughcast over timber framing with two storeys and an attic, and the extension is in limestone with two storeys. The roofs are slated. The original range has three bays. Both parts have casement windows, there is a full dormer in the original range, and at the rear is a timber framed lean-to dairy.	II
25 Wotherton; 52.59668°N 3.07136°W	—	Mid to late 17th century	The cottage is timber framed with plaster infill, it has a stone gabled wing to the right, and the roof is thatched. It has one storey and an attic, the main range has two bays, and there is a brick lean-to at the rear. The windows are casements, and there are two raking eaves dormers.	II
School House and school 52.57955°N 3.09061°W	—	1675	The house is the older part, it is timber framed with brick infill, a slate roof, two storeys and an attic, three bays, and a brick rear extension. There is a central porch, a central gabled dormer, and casement windows. The school to the left dates from the 19th century, it is in limestone with a slate roof. It has one storey, a central gable, and mullioned and transomed windows. The entrance is on the left side, and has a pointed doorway under a gabled canopy with a bell.	II
Farmbuildings, Chirbury Hall; 52.58032°N 3.09143°W	—	Late 17th century	The farm buildings form two ranges at right angles. The north range is timber framed and weatherboarded on a limestone plinth, and has a slate roof. The west range, originally timber framed, has been rebuilt in limestone, and has an asbestos sheet roof. Behind the west range is a red brick gin gang. The ranges contain windows, a cart entrance, stable doors, other doors, and eaves hatches.	II
Barn, Hagley Farm; 52.57121°N 3.06681°W	—	Late 17th century	The barn is timber framed and weatherboarded on a limestone plinth, and has a slate roof. There are two levels, external steps lead up to a central door, and this is flanked by eaves hatches.	II
Barn, Kingswood Farm; 52.56375°N 3.06642°W	—	Late 17th century	The barn is timber framed and weatherboarded with limestone in the right bay, and has a corrugated iron roof. It has two levels, four eaves hatches, and a doorway.	II
Barn, Little Brompton Farm; 52.53932°N 3.11607°W	—	Late 17th century	The barn is timber framed and weatherboarded and has a slate roof. There are two levels, two eaves hatches, and scattered doors.	II
Cowhouse, Lower Aldress Farm; 52.56343°N 3.05869°W	—	Late 17th century	The cowhouse is timber framed and weatherboarded, there is corrugated iron cladding on the west side, and it has a stone-slate roof. There are two levels, four eaves hatches, and five doors on the east side.	II
Barn, Manor Farm; 52.61630°N 3.05384°W	—	Late 17th century	The barn is timber framed and weatherboarded on a limestone plinth, and has a slate roof. There are two levels, and it contains a full-height cart entrance, full-height double doors and stable doors.	II
Outbuilding, Manor Farm; 52.61599°N 3.05401°W	—	Late 17th century	The outbuilding is timber framed with red brick infill on a high limestone plinth, and a corrugated iron roof. The gable ends are partly weatherboarded, and there is corrugated iron cladding on the front. There are two levels and an open front.	II
Rockabank; 52.59183°N 3.06184°W	—	Late 17th century	A farmhouse that was extended in the 19th century. The original part is timber framed with brick infill on a stone plinth, the extension is in brick painted to resemble timber framing, and the roof is slated. There is one storey and an attic, the original part has two bays, and the extension has one bay. The windows are casements, and there are two gabled eaves dormers. On the front is a lean-to porch, and to the right of it is a segmental-headed doorway.	II
Barn, Rorrington Hall; 52.60019°N 3.03722°W	—	Late 17th century	The barn is timber framed and weatherboarded, the southwest gable end is in limestone, and it has a slate roof. There are two levels, on the south side are two eaves hatches, double central doors and flanking doors.	II
Sidnal Farmhouse; 52.56092°N 3.08891°W	—	Late 17th century	The farmhouse was altered and extended in the 19th century. It is timber framed with brick infill, the extensions are in red brick, and there is a slate roof. The farmhouse has a T-shaped plan, the front range has one storey and an attic and two bays, and at the rear is a two-storey gabled wing. There is a gabled porch flanked by casement windows with segmental heads, and above are gabled eaves dormers.	II
Barn, Sidnal Farm; 52.56075°N 3.08924°W	—	Late 17th century	Originally a threshing barn, later stables, it is timber framed and weatherboarded with a corrugated iron roof. There are two levels, three doors, and three eaves hatches, two of which have been converted into windows.	II
Barn, Steps Farm; 52.61682°N 3.05269°W	—	Late 17th century	The barn is timber framed and weatherboarded on a limestone plinth, and has a slate roof. It has two levels, a flight of external steps, and it contains three eaves hatches and a stable door.	II
The Beeches; 52.62569°N 3.06389°W	—	Late 17th century (probable)	A farmhouse in limestone and shale slabs, with red brick dressings and a slate roof. It has one storey and an attic and three bays. The ground floor windows have fixed lights and segmental heads, and above are three gabled eaves dormers.	II
The Old Post Office; 52.56931°N 3.04774°W		Late 17th century	The building has been at times an inn, a post office, and a private house. It is in limestone with a slate roof. There is one storey with attics, three bays, and a short range on the left. The windows are casements, and there are three gabled half-dormers.	II
Barn, Upper Gwarthlow Farm; 52.54951°N 3.10957°W	—	Late 17th century	The barn is timber framed and weatherboarded, the south gable end is in limestone, and it has a corrugated iron roof. There are eaves hatches and doors on the west side.	II
Brook House; 52.56873°N 3.04691°W	—	Early 18th century (probable)	A limestone farmhouse with a slate roof, one storey and an attic. Originally it had two bays, and a bay was added to the right in the 19th century. There is a gabled timber porch, casement windows, and gabled eaves dormers.	II
Barn, Little Brompton Farm; 52.53948°N 3.11595°W	—	Early 18th century	The barn is timber framed and weatherboarded, and partly clad in corrugated iron. It is on a stone and brick plinth, and has limestone in the left gable end. The roof is slated, the barn has two levels, and it contains three doors and three eaves hatches.	II
Pentrehyling House; 52.52921°N 3.11570°W	—	Early to mid 18th century (probable)	A farmhouse, later a private house, in limestone with a slate roof. It has two storeys and an attic, three bays, and a two-storey lean-to at the rear. The windows are multi-paned casements with segmental heads, and the central doorway also has a segmental head.	II
Barn, Wotherton Hall Farm; 52.59823°N 3.06000°W	—	Early to mid 18th century	The barn is in red brick on a stone plinth, and has a tiled roof with crowstepped gables and finials. There are two levels, and it contains double doors, eaves hatches, segmental-headed openings, infilled air vents, and circular owl holes.	II
Chirbury Hall; 52.58002°N 3.09115°W	—	1736	The farmhouse is a remodelling of an earlier building, and it was extended in the 19th century. It is in limestone with quoins, dressings in red brick, and a slate roof with coping, and with finials on the gable ends. There are two storeys and an attic, four bays, and a 19th-century L-shaped service range on the right. The windows in the upper floor are casements, in the ground floor they are sashes, there is a French window, and four gabled dormers. On the front is a gabled porch and a datestone.	II
The Bridge House; 52.57838°N 3.09405°W	—	Mid to late 18th century	The house is in limestone with a sill band and a slate roof. There are two storeys, a front of three bays, and two ranges at the rear. The windows are multi-paned casements, with chamfered surrounds in the ground floor. Above the central doorway is a bracketed segmental hood.	II
Church House; 52.57893°N 3.09162°W	—	Late 18th century	A red brick house with a slate roof, two storeys and an attic, three bays, and a lower range in brick and stone at the rear. The central doorway has pilasters, a rectangular fanlight, and a hood. The windows are multi-paned casements with segmental heads, and there are three gabled dormers.	II
Groton Farmhouse; 52.60999°N 3.04583°W	—	Late 18th century	The farmhouse is in red brick and has a slate roof with coped verges. There are three storeys, three bays, and a two-storey service range on the left. The windows are sashes, and the central doorway has pilasters, a semicircular fanlight and an open pediment.	II
Group of ten chest tombs 52.57929°N 3.09112°W	—	Late 18th century	The chest tombs are in the churchyard of St Michael's Church. They are in limestone and are rectangular, with moulded plinths and caps. Some have fluted corner pilasters but most are plain.	II
Herbert Arms Hotel; 52.57884°N 3.09180°W		Late 18th century	A house, later a public house, it is in brick with a toothed eaves cornice and a slate roof. It has three storeys, three bays, a short rear range, and a single-storey extension to the right. There is a central doorway with a plain surround, the windows in the main part are sashes, and in the extension they are casements.	II
Dovecote, Rorrington Hall; 52.59917°N 3.03674°W	—	Late 18th century	The dovecote is in brick on a stone plinth, and has a square plan and a tiled pyramidal roof with wooden louvres. There is a segmental-headed doorway and a rectangular opening on each side.	II
Gate piers, Rorrington Hall; 52.60016°N 3.03763°W	—	Late 18th century	The gate piers are at the entrance to the drive. They are in limestone and have a square section, moulded caps, and ball finials.	II
Walkmill; 52.57457°N 3.07414°W	—	1802	A former fulling mill and a mill house in limestone with a slate roof. The house has three storeys and four bays. The mill is at the rear and has flat-roofed eaves dormers. In the house and the mill are casement windows with segmental heads, and there is a doorway in the angle between them.	II
Group of four chest tombs 52.57938°N 3.09112°W	—	c. 1820	The chest tombs are in the churchyard of St Michael's Church. They are in limestone, and are rectangular with moulded plinths and caps and chamfered tops. One tomb has urn-shaped corner pilasters.	II
East Dudston Farmhouse; 52.56959°N 3.11522°W	—	Early 19th century	The farmhouse is a remodelling of an earlier building, and it was later extended. It is in red brick with slate roofs. The earliest range has two storeys and an attic, and three bays. A gabled wing was added later to the right, and there are two rear wings, one with one storey and the other with two. Most of the windows are casements with segmental heads, in the main range is a canted bay window, and the windows in the wing have stone wedge lintels. The entrance has a gabled trellis porch, and above the door is a fanlight.	II
Stockton Mill; 52.60033°N 3.08567°W	—	Early 19th century	The former mill is in limestone with a brick top storey and a slate roof. It has three storeys. The doorway and most windows have segmental heads. Some machinery remains but the wheel has gone.	II
Upper Gwarthlow Farmhouse; 52.54957°N 3.10989°W	—	Early 19th century	A remodelling of an earlier house, probably from the 17th century and with a timber framed core. It is in red brick with a dentilled eaves cornice and a slate roof. There are two storeys and three bays, and a timber framed lean-to at the rear. The windows are casements, in the ground floor they have segmental heads, and the doorway also has a segmental head.	II
Hockelton Bridge; 52.59525°N 3.07373°W	—	1835	The bridge, designed by Edward Haycock, carries the B4386 road over the River Camlad. It is in limestone, and consists of a single elliptical arch. The bridge has rusticated voussoirs, projecting keystones, a moulded string course, and rectangular corner piers.	II
Milestone at NGR SO 2410 9777; 52.57248°N 3.12110°W	—	Early 19th century	The milestone is on the south side of the B4386 road. It is in limestone and has a rectangular section and a curved top. There is a cast iron plate inscribed with the distances in miles from Montgomery and from "SALOP" (Shrewsbury).	II
Milestone at NGR SO 2448 9376; 52.53553°N 3.11307°W	—	Early 19th century	The milestone is on the northeast side of the B4385 road. It is in limestone and has a rectangular section and a curved top. There is a cast iron plate inscribed with the distances in miles from Montgomery and from Bishop's Castle.	II
Milestone at NGR SO 2463 9319; 52.52986°N 3.11404°W	—	Early 19th century	The milestone is on the south side of the A489 road. It is in limestone and has a rectangular section and a curved top. It is inscribed with the distances in miles to London, to Bishop's Castle, and to Newtown.	II
Woodmore; 52.59776°N 3.06950°W	—	Early to mid 19th century	A limestone farmhouse with a slate roof, two storeys and an attic, and a front of three bays. Recessed at right angles at the left is a later extension with a dentil eaves cornice. The windows are casements, and the central doorway has pilasters and a pedimented hood.	II
Wotherton Hall Farmhouse; 52.59851°N 3.05949°W	—	1839	A remodelling of an earlier building, it is in red brick with a limestone front, and has a slate roof. There is an L-shaped plan, with a rear lean-to. The farmhouse has two storeys, a front of three bays, a sill band, and a central pediment-like gable containing a datestone. The windows are multi-pane casements, with chamfered stone surrounds, and the central round-arched doorway has crudely carved capitals, a fanlight, and a moulded entablature.	II
Stables and wall, Wotherton Hall Farm; 52.59850°N 3.05970°W	—	c. 1839	The building is partly in limestone, partly in brick, and partly timber framed, and has a slate roof. There are two storeys, with stables below, a granary above, and a two-bay cart shelter at the rear. The doorways have segmental heads, and the building is linked to the farmhouse by a stone wall containing a segmental arch with a wooden door.	II
Holy Trinity Church, Middleton; 52.58733°N 3.03871°W		1843	The church was designed by Edward Haycock, and the chancel and transepts, (acting a vestry and as an organ chamber), were added in about 1875. The church is in limestone and shale, and has tiled roofs with coped verges. It consists of a nave, a chancel with a polygonal apse, transepts, and a west porch. On the west gable is a bellcote, and the windows are lancets.	II
St Mark's Church, Marton; 52.61650°N 3.05206°W		1854–55	The church is n limestone and shale, and has tiled roofs. It consists of a nave a gabled timber north porch, a lower chancel, and a south vestry. On the west gable is a stone bellcote, and the windows are lancets.	II
Pump, Old Post Office; 52.56934°N 3.04770°W	—	Mid to late 19th century	The pump is in cast iron. It has a fluted shaft, a pointed finial on the cap, a decorated spout and a curved handle.	II
Chirbury War Memorial; 52.57918°N 3.09160°W	—	1918	The war memorial is in the churchyard of St Michael's Church. It consists of a sandstone cross standing on two plinths on a platform. On the front of the cross is a sculpture of the Crucifixion above which is a scroll carved with INRI, and the top is gabled. On the plinths are inscriptions and the names of those lost in the two World Wars.	II
Middleton-in-Chirbury War Memorial; 52.58689°N 3.03886°W	—	c. 1920	The war memorial is in the churchyard of Holy Trinity Church. It is in stone and consists of a cross on a tall pillar, standing on a plinth on a base of three steps. On the plinth and on the top step are inscriptions and the names of these lost in the two World Wars.	II
