= Thomas Bray =

English Anglican priest in colonial Maryland (died 1730)

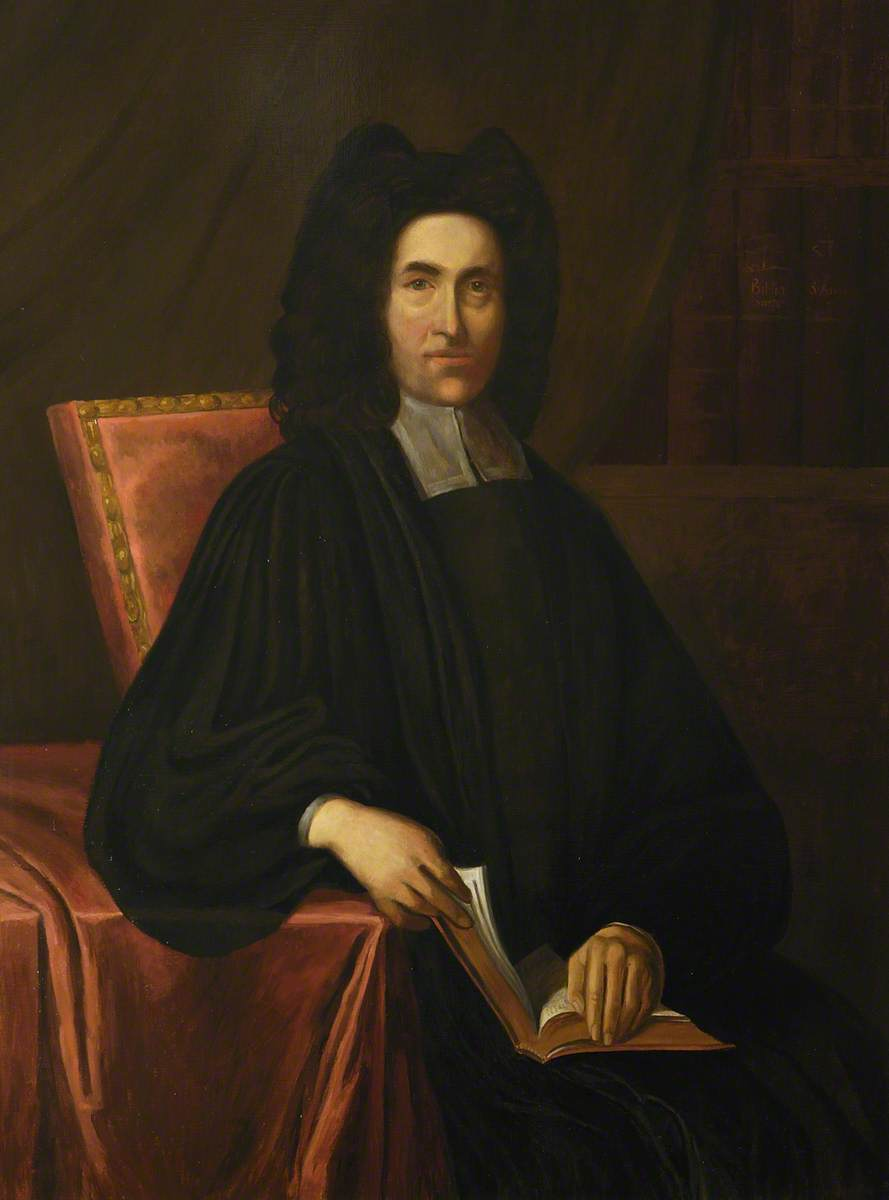

Priest, Founder of the SPCK and the SPG
- Born: 1656 or 1658; Marton, Shropshire, England
- Died: 15 February 1730; London, England
- Venerated in: Episcopal Church (USA); Church of England Anglican Church of Canada
- Feast: 15 February

Thomas Bray (1656 or 1658 – 15 February 1730) was an English clergyman and abolitionist who helped formally establish the Church of England in Maryland, as well as the Society for the Propagation of Christian Knowledge and Society for the Propagation of the Gospel in Foreign Parts.

== Life ==
=== Early life ===
Thomas Bray was born in Marton, then in the parish of Chirbury, Shropshire, at a house today called Bray's Tenement, (Note: See Bray's Tenement (Q98456201); 52.620220°N 3.070535°W) on Marton Crest, in 1656 or 1658, the year he was baptised on 2 May at Chirbury. Bray's parents, Richard and Mary Bray, were poor farmers. He was educated at Oswestry Grammar School and Oxford University, where he earned a B.A. degree with All Souls College in 1678 and a M.A. with Hart Hall in 1693. He also completed the work for B.D. and D.D. degrees at Oxford (Magdalen, 17 December 1696) at the request of Maryland's governor, but was unable to pay the required fees.

=== Ministry ===
After graduation and ordination, Bray returned to the Midlands as a curate at Bridgnorth and then became chaplain to the family of Sir Thomas Price in Warwickshire. Price also gave Thomas Bray a position at Lea Marston, where his diligence and library drew the attention of a neighboring vicar, John Kettlewell at Coleshill. Kettlewell pointed out to Bray that the poverty of country parsons kept them from owning and reading theological books, which could lead to ignorance and hopelessness and affect their ministry. Kettlewell also introduced him to Sir Charles Holt and to Lord Digby whose brother made Thomas vicar of Over Whitacre, and in 1690 rector of St Giles' Church, Sheldon. In addition to his parish duties at Shelden, Bray also wrote the first volume of what he intended to be a four-volume set of Catechetical Lectures. He published the first volume, in 1696, titled, A Course of Lectures Upon the Church Catechism, dedicating it to William Lloyd, Bishop of Lichfield. However, he never published the remaining volumes.

The book sold well, throughout England, and it drew the attention of Henry Compton, Bishop of London. In 1696, Bishop Compton appointed Mr. Bray as his commissary to organize the Church of England in the Colony of Maryland. Protestant rebels had ousted the Catholic Proprietor, Lord Baltimore in the colony's revolution, and in 1689 (the year after the Glorious Revolution in Britain), the British Crown ousted the proprietor's governor and took title to the restive Colony. Maryland already had numerous Church of England parishes, and had requested an "experienced, unexceptionable priest" to supervise them. However, such organization needed royal authorization, as well as additional priests. Mr Bray knew that the clergy willing to accept positions overseas were often among the poorest, unable to bring or obtain religious books, so he conditioned his acceptance upon having funds to supply the parishes with books, which educational mission was soon expanded to deaneries in England and Wales as the Society for Promoting Christian Knowledge (founded March 1698). Meanwhile, Lord Baltimore's heir, Benedict then a devout Catholic, had fled to France, but in 1698 received a royal licence to return to England, where he soon married.

Due to England vetoing the establishment for a commissary, Bray's trip to Maryland was delayed prompting a "resubmission of the act for His Majesty's assent". In 1699 Thomas Bray sailed to Maryland, along with two recruited priests. He had started his library work by establishing seaport libraries at Gravesend, Deal, and Plymouth on his outward journey. By the time Bray left Maryland the following year, he had divided the colony's ten counties into thirty parishes, as well as established seventeen parish libraries there—the one in the colonial capital at Annapolis in part using four hundred silver pounds contributed by Princess Anne of Denmark (of £1500 pledged by wealthy subscribers, including two archbishops and five bishops). Bray took a great interest in colonial missions, especially among the slaves and Native Americans, writing and preaching vigorously against slavery and the oppression of Indians. Bray left swiftly after securing the establishment of the Church of England in the colony pursuant to an Act of the Assembly in 1700, because the colony's Quakers had lobbyists in England attempting to secure the law's veto, as had happened twice before.

Upon returning to England, in 1701 Bray published an expanded edition of his Catechesis, as well as a report on the Church of England in North America, which refuted the Quaker arguments against the church's establishment in the colony. Rev. Bray did not, however, manage to get a bishop authorized for the colony. He also helped secure a royal charter for the Society for the Propagation of the Gospel in Foreign Parts, now known as USPG in June 1701.

His scheme for establishing parish libraries in England and America, succeeded: with 80 established in England and Wales during his lifetime (as well as a 1709 royal act securing the preservation of English parish libraries) and another 39 in the Colonies. Bray envisioned a library for each parish in America:

To obtain books for these libraries, requests are to be made to the learned authors now living, to give copies of their books, and to others, especially merchants to the foreign plantations, to give money, of all of which there shall be a full account published.

— Steiner 1896, pp. 59–75

These libraries were meant to encourage the spread of the Anglican church in Britain's colonies, and as such mostly included theological works. It was a major endeavor, as at the time the only other public libraries in the American colonies were at a small number of universities. Bray's efforts would eventually lead to the founding of almost 100 libraries in America and more than 200 libraries in England.

In 1706, Bray accepted the position as rector of St Botolph's, Aldgate, a position which he had refused before his Maryland voyage. He spent the final decades of his life serving that London parish, as well as engaging in other philanthropic and literary activities, until his death in February 1730. Visitors were especially impressed by his catechising of charity children well into his own old age, as well as work on behalf of prisoners at Newgate prison, including weekly "beef and beer" dinners and proposals for prison reform. His last publication was a memoir of John Rawlet of Newcastle, another friend of John Kettlewell.

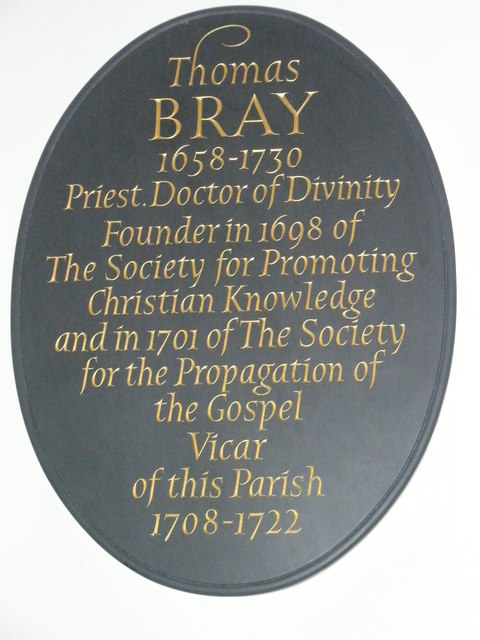
Memorial plaque in St Botolph's, Aldgate

In 1723, Bray became seriously ill, and worried that his evangelistic work in rural deaneries and among Africans and Native Americans might lapse. He formed a group of 'associates' to succeed him. Known collectively as Doctor Bray's Associates, the group received a chancery charter shortly after his death, and continues to publish an annual report of their activities.

=== Contribution to Colonial Libraries ===
Bray published several documents outlining the creation of both parochial and local libraries in the American colonies. Proposals for the Encouragement and Promoting of Religion and Learning in Foreign Plantations, published in 1695, first presented his ideas of a parochial library in every parish in America. The intention behind these libraries was to provide reference for the local clergymen and other literate men. This pamphlet provided instructions on what books to procure, their cost, and how to ensure the books remained in the library.

Bray later published An Essay Towards Promoting all Necessary and Useful Knowledge, Both Divine and Human, in all the Parts of His Majesty’s Dominions, Both at Home and Abroad, in 1697. This pamphlet introduced Bray’s earliest ideas for a classification system and would be referenced by future librarians when establishing a more universal classification system within America. The categories included Church History, General History, Geography and Travel, Theology, Latin Classics, Medicine, and Gardening. This pamphlet was built upon previous publications and a predecessor to Bray’s monumental Bibliotheca Parochialis.

Originally published in 1697, the book received sizeable additions in the revised publication in 1707, which is the most researched edition. The book contained a thorough bibliography of the books Bray believed to be most relevant to new clergymen, but it was also an excellent reference resource later for local libraries. The seven chapters of the book are influenced by Bray’s classification system. Chapter one covers ministerial directories as it relates to pastoral duties and care. Chapter two contains historical and philosophical books that relate to theology. Chapters three, four, and five cover matters of pneumatology, natural religion and heresy respectively. Chapter six contains books on scriptural criticism, and chapter seven covers the Church Fathers, councils, liturgies, and rituals.

=== Death ===
Thomas Bray died on 15 February 1730, aged at least 71, and was buried two days later in the churchyard at St. Botolph's.

== Legacy ==
St Botolph's eventually erected a memorial plaque in his honor. In 1901, a memorial plaque was erected in the parish church at Chirbury. A contemporary described him as "a Great Small Man." Rev. Bray's concern for poor debtors and plan to allow them to emigrate overseas to better themselves drew the interest of General James Oglethorpe who received a royal charter to establish a colony in Georgia two years after Bray's death. The Episcopal Church, which received 50 libraries from Bray's society (17 in Maryland, mostly in what later became the Episcopal Diocese of Easton), remembers Rev. Thomas Bray with a feast day on its liturgical calendar on the anniversary of his death, 15 February. The Special Collections division of the University of Maryland has much of his correspondence with Maryland officials. The Diocese of Easton named its headquarters building to honor Bray.

Bray has been referred to as the Father of the Modern Lending Library. It is as a direct result of his efforts that a great deal of reading material was capable of flowing into the American colonies.

Bray's work in America is currently recognized as the first major coordinated effort to establish libraries in the New World. From the time of his death all the way up until the American Revolution, only four new libraries were founded in the American Colonies.

The Society for the Propagation of the Gospel persisted in its work even after the passing of its founder. The society managed to send out books, pamphlets, and other reading material in order to aid missionaries in the colonies. The work of the Society continued in America up until the end of the Revolutionary War, with correspondence requesting books from the Society as late as 1771 in North Carolina. The Society also perpetuated Bray's aspirations for a ministry to the mistreated Native American and African peoples within the American colonies. Correspondence between the Society and a missionary named Alexander Stuart clearly shows the Society's hand in the education of both African and Native American peoples during the 18th century. Bray's work in America is recognized as the first major coordinated effort to establish libraries in the New World.

Thomas is remembered in the Church of England with a commemoration and honored with a feast on the Episcopal Church calendar on 15 February, as well as in the Anglican Church of Canada.

== Family ==
Rev. Bray married firstly, in about 1685, Elenor (surname not known), who died in 1688 having borne a son and daughter, and secondly, on 3 November 1698, Agnes Sayers, of Clerkenwell, London, with whom he had four children who all died young.

== Publications ==
Bray's publications included;

- Bibliotheca catechetica
- The Good Fight of Faith
- Two Select Discourses on Faith, and the Objects Thereof, the Articles of the Apostles Creed. The First on Faith, Shewing the Nature and Difference of that Faith which is Justifying, and of That Which Is Not. The Second, The Practical Believer: Or, the Articles of the Apostles Creed, Drawn Out To Form a True Christian's Heart and Practice.Two Treatises Upon the Covenant of Grace, The First, A Discourse of the Nature, Ends, and Difference of the Two Covenants. The Second Catechetical Lectures Upon the Preliminary Questions and Answers of the Church-Catechism (Four Books in One), 1703, with William Allen and John Kettleworth

== See also ==
- Society for the Propagation of the Gospel in Foreign Parts
- Society for the Propagation of Christian Knowledge
