= Priest Weston =

Village in Shropshire, England

Coordinates: 52.571°N 3.050°W

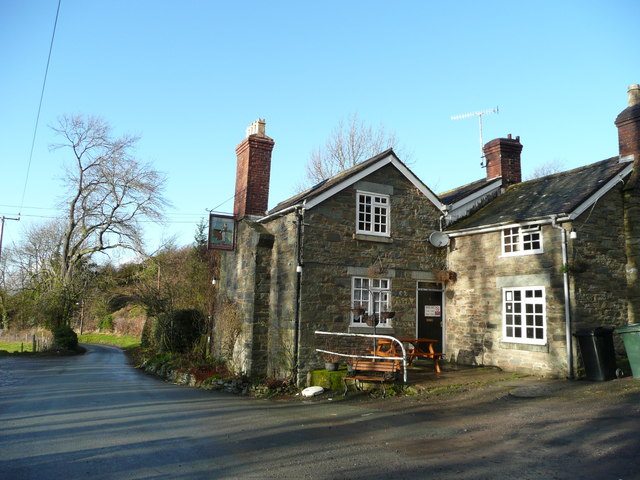
- The village pub at Priest Weston

- Location within Shropshire
- OS grid reference: SO289976
- Civil parish: Chirbury with Brompton
- Unitary authority: Shropshire
- Ceremonial county: Shropshire
- Region: West Midlands
- Country: England
- Sovereign state: United Kingdom
- Post town: MONTGOMERY
- Postcode district: SY15
- Dialling code: 01938
- Police: West Mercia
- Fire: Shropshire
- Ambulance: West Midlands
- UK Parliament: Ludlow

Priest Weston (or Priestweston) is a small village in the civil parish of Chirbury with Brompton, Shropshire, England, lying in the Welsh Marches. The village is located near to the English-Welsh border, at the foot of Corndon Hill. Due to a quirk of the border geography in the area of Corndon Hill, the nearest village in Wales, White Grit, lies to the east of Priestweston.

Its name is based on the Old English for "western settlement (tun)", with the affix priest in reference to the estate of the Prior of Chirbury at Weston Parva. It was mentioned in Domesday, and later became part of the possessions of the Botterell family.

Second World War Victoria Cross winner John Brunt was born there in 1922 and his family lived there before moving to near Whittington, Shropshire some six years later. An outdoor memorial plaque to his memory was put up in the village in May 2004.

The village church at Middleton-in-Chirbury is located a mile from Priest Weston.

A megalithic stone circle known as Mitchell's Fold is located within Shropshire on nearby Stapeley Hill, and there are also remains of a second circle, known as the Whetstones, a short distance to the east over the Welsh border in Montgomeryshire. There is also a traditional pub, The Miner's Arms.

National Cycle Route 44 passes through the village.

== See also ==
- Listed buildings in Chirbury with Brompton
