= Ludovic Lloyd =

Ludovic Lloyd (floruit 1573–1610) was a Welsh courtier, poet and compiler of miscellanies.

== Life ==
He was the fifth son of Oliver Lloyd, lord of the manor of Marrington, Chirbury, Shropshire, England, by Gwenllian, daughter of Griffith ap Howel ab Ieuan Blayney of Gregynog, Montgomeryshire, Wales. He describes himself in his works as sergeant-at-arms to Queen Elizabeth, and continued in the post under James I. He was an intimate friend of the poet John Lane. His works were all dedicated to highly placed court figures.

== Works ==
Lloyd's major compilation is The Pilgrimage of Princes. Prefixed are commendatory verses by, among others, Edward Grant and Thomas Churchyard.

Lloyd's other works are:

- The Consent of Time, Deciphering the Errors of the Grecians in their Olympiads, 1590, dedicated to John Whitgift.
- The Triplicitie of Triumphs, containing the Order, Solempnitie, and Pompe of the Feastes, Sacrifices, Vowes, Games, and Triumphes used upon the Nativities of Emperors, 1591.
- A Brief Conference of Divers Lawes, Divided into certaine Regiments, 1602, dedicated to Queen Elizabeth.
- The Stratagems of Jerusalem; with the Martiall Lawes and Militarie Discipline, as well of the Jewes as of the Gentiles, 1602, dedicated to Sir Robert Cecil.
- The Practice of Policy, 1604.
- The Choice of Jewels, London, 1607, containing verses arranged acrostically on the words "To Anna Queene of Gret Britane Health" followed by congratulations to Christian, king of Denmark, on his visit to England in 1607.
- The Tragicomedie of Serpents, 1607, a collection, chiefly of classical and biblical fables, dedicated to James I.
- Linceus Spectacles. Esa. 6, Videntes videbitis non videbitis, 1607, dedicated to James I, and similar in character to the preceding.
- Hilaria, or the Triumphant Feast for the fifth of August (Coronation Day), 1607.
- The Jubile of Britane, 1607.

An epitaph by Lloyd, on Sir Edward Saunders, is printed in the Paradise of Dainty Devices, 1576. Lloyd has commendatory verses signed Lodowick Flood, prefixed to The Castle or Picture of Policy of William Blandie, and verses in praise of the author prefixed to Thomas Twyne's translation of Humphrey Llwyd's Breviary of Britayne, 1573.
