= Middleton (near Chirbury) =

Coordinates: 52.583°N 3.040°W

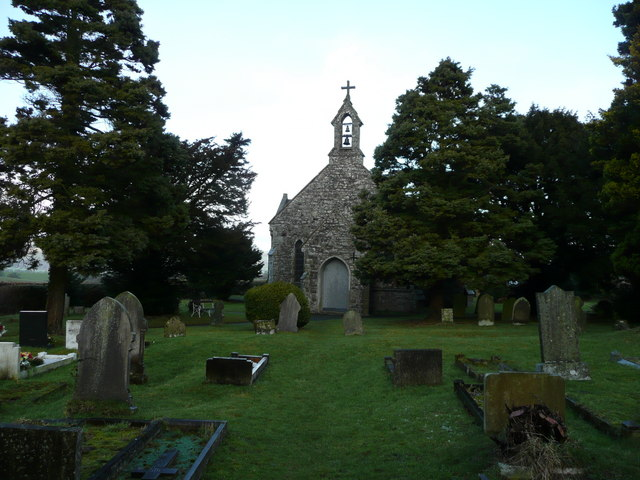
- Holy Trinity in Middleton-in-Chirbury parish

- Location within Shropshire
- OS grid reference: SO295989
- Civil parish: Chirbury with Brompton
- Unitary authority: Shropshire
- Ceremonial county: Shropshire
- Region: West Midlands
- Country: England
- Sovereign state: United Kingdom
- Post town: MONTGOMERY
- Postcode district: SY15
- Dialling code: 01938
- Police: West Mercia
- Fire: Shropshire
- Ambulance: West Midlands
- UK Parliament: Ludlow

Middleton is a scattered settlement in Shropshire with a chapel (Holy Trinity) and a former schoolhouse. It was once much more populated but went into decline once mining ended in the area. It is situated in the civil parish of Chirbury with Brompton, in the west of the county.

Middleton is a parish ward within that parish, returning 3 councillors. Historically it was a township of the hundred of Chirbury. The ecclesiastical parish is known as Middleton-in-Chirbury.

To the north is the hamlet of Rorrington, to the south the small village of Priest Weston, both also in the parish of Chirbury with Brompton.

== See also ==
- Listed buildings in Chirbury with Brompton
