= Brompton and Rhiston =

Former civil parish in Shropshire, England

Coordinates: 52.54°N 3.1°W

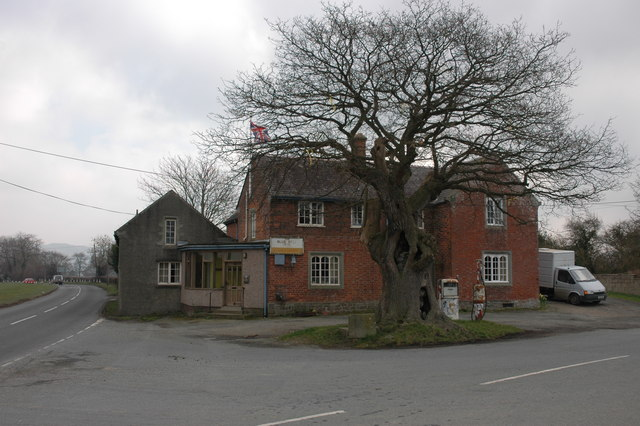
- The Blue Bell, Brompton Bridge

- Location within Shropshire
- Civil parish: Chirbury with Brompton
- Unitary authority: Shropshire
- Ceremonial county: Shropshire
- Region: West Midlands
- Country: England
- Sovereign state: United Kingdom
- Police: West Mercia
- Fire: Shropshire
- Ambulance: West Midlands

Brompton and Rhiston is a former civil parish, now in the parish of Chirbury with Brompton, in Shropshire, England. Brompton and Rhiston continues as a parish ward within the new civil parish, returning two councillors. In 1971, the parish had a population of 93.

The parish included the settlements of Brompton and Pentreheyling, both of which are hamlets. Rhiston is a small hamlet, partly in Wales. It was historically more notable and has an entry in the Domesday Book.

The neighbouring places of Brompton and Pentreheyling are notable for the fact that they are impossible to reach from any other place in England by road without first passing through Wales. Public footpaths are the only access which link them with the rest of England. They are however not geographically an exclave.

In 1866 Brompton and Rhiston became a civil parish, on 1 April 1987 the parish was abolished and merged with Chirbury to form "Chirbury with Brompton".
