= Paul von Bruns =

German surgeon

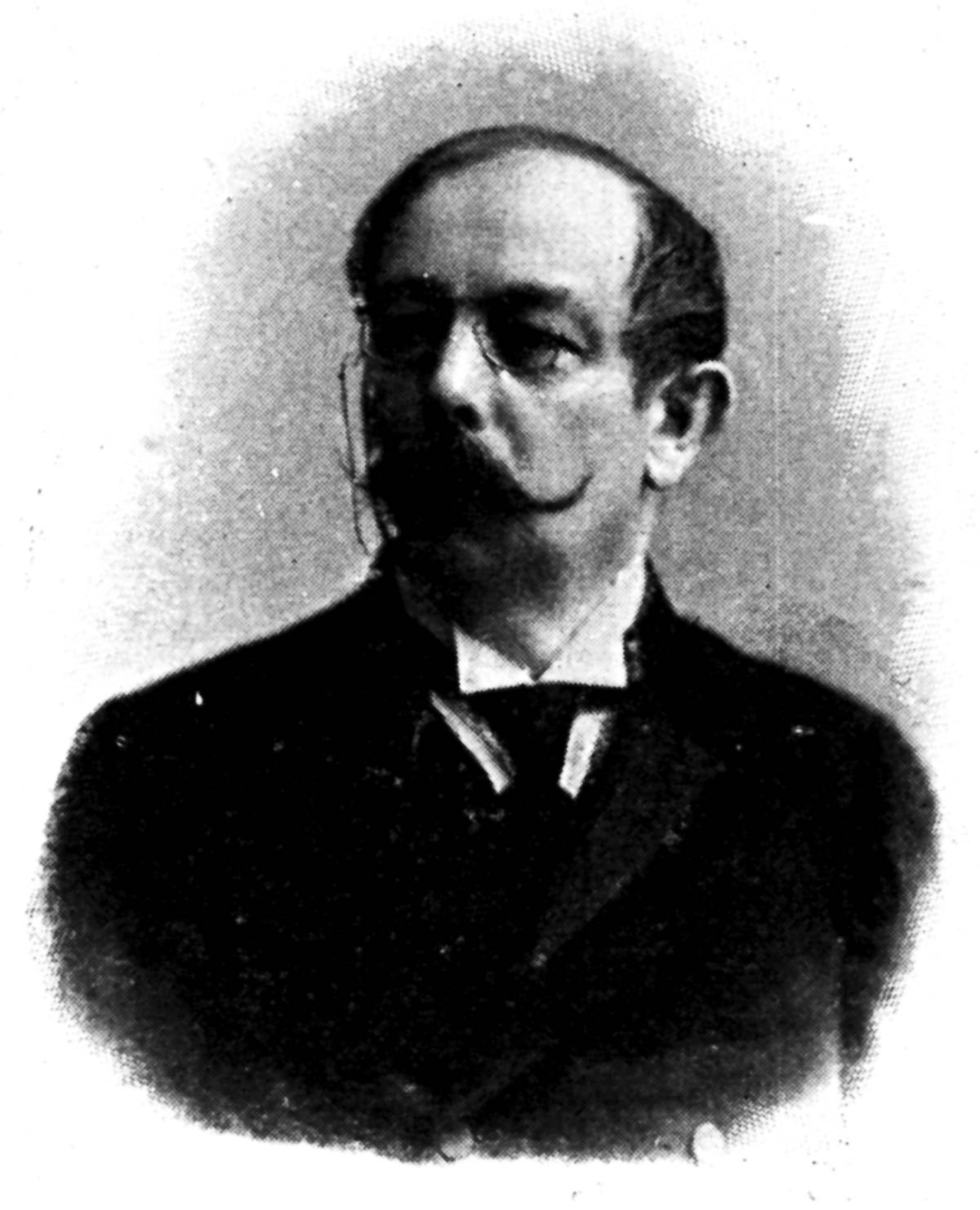
Paul von Bruns (1846-1916)

Paul von Bruns was a German surgeon. He was born in Tübingen, and was the son of surgeon Victor von Bruns. His father-in-law was Protestant theologian Karl Heinrich Weizsäcker.

Bruns was born July 2, 1846. In 1882, Bruns became director of the surgical clinic at Tübingen, as well as a full professor at the University. He was the author of works on numerous medical subjects — laryngotomy for removal of growths in the larynx, acute osteomyelitis, gunshot wounds, limb operations and the treatment of goiters, to name a few.

In 1885, he founded Beiträge zur klinischen Chirurgie (Contributions to Clinical Surgery), and was its editor until his death. With Ernst von Bergmann (1836-1907) and Jan Mikulicz-Radecki (1850-1905), he published the four-volume Handbuch der Chirurgie (Handbook of Surgery). He died – June 2, 1916 in Tübingen.
