= John Brunt V.C. (public house) =

Public house in Paddock Wood, Kent, England

Coordinates: 51°10′52″N 0°23′28″E

Old John Brunt V.C. Pub Sign

The John Brunt V.C. is a public house in Paddock Wood in Kent, England. Originally named The Kent Arms, on 3 September 1947 the pub was formally renamed John Brunt V.C. in honour of an English soldier, John Brunt, who won the Victoria Cross in the Second World War who spent his teenage years in the town.

== The early years ==
The Brunt family settled in Paddock Wood in the 1930s and their son, John, was a frequent visitor to The Kent Arms as a teenager. He was killed fighting in the Second World War, on 10 December 1944, in Italy. On 3 September 1947 a naming ceremony took place, and a new sign (designed by Kathleen M Claxton, and built at Whitbread's Wateringbury brewery), bearing a portrait of John with his name underneath, was unveiled by his father, Thomas Brunt. A miniature replica of the sign painted in oils was presented to the latter by Sir Sydney Nevile, Managing Director of Whitbread and Co Ltd

In May 1949 Whitbread began issuing 2 in × 3 in (51 mm × 76 mm) plaques featuring pub signs of Kent and the south-eastern portion of Sussex. Known as Whitbread's Inn Sign Miniatures, five series of 50 each were produced between 1949 and 1955, the first three series in metal, the third series reissued in card, and the last two series issued only in card. Number 43 of the first series was The John Brunt, V.C.

== The "Hooden Horse" controversy ==
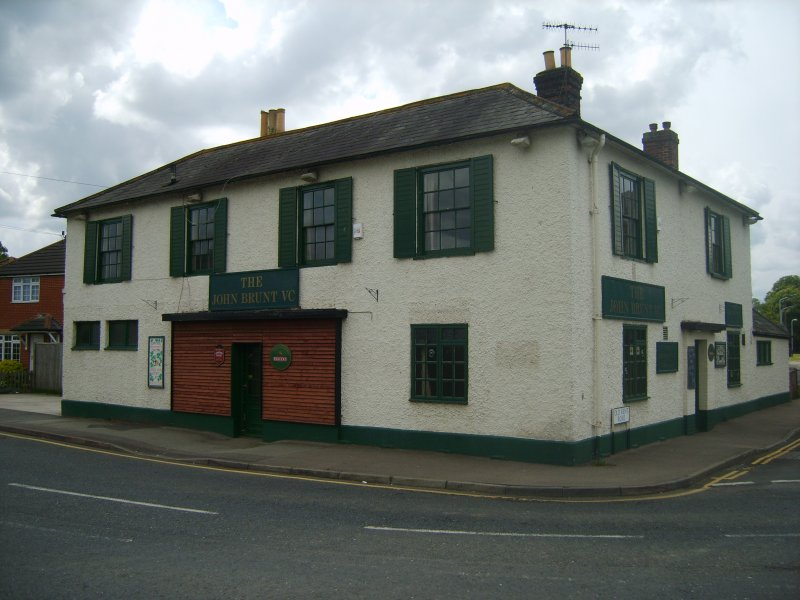
The John Brunt V.C.

By the late 1990s, the pub had gained a reputation for drugs, trouble and after-hours drinking and the Whitbread brewery sold it to the Inn Business pub chain. On Sunday 1 June 1997, after a final night disco, the pub closed. The new owners announced that it was going to be renamed The Hopping Hooden Horse because of the hop cultivation in the area, and that it would have the initials JBVC after the name to retain the history of the town. Within a week work had begun on renovating the pub, and no more than two days after an article in the local newspaper revealed the plans a campaign to retrieve the pub sign, and a petition to retain the original name had been started.

The new owners of Hooden Horse Inns ltd, Inn Business PLC, after receiving some letters of complaint announced that: "most of our pubs contain the corporate Hooden Horse name and there was simply no way we could have made the place work under the name John Brunt V.C." and the newly renamed pub opened 6 days before the 50 year anniversary of the original naming ceremony on 28 August 1997. Bob Akehurst, a Paddock Wood resident, threatened to stand against the existing Paddock Wood councillors in the local elections if they did not take appropriate action to ensure that John Brunt's name was remembered.

Some former customers refused to enter the pub now that the name had changed and Mr. Akehurst, who remembered John Brunt, said that to "call the place The Hopping Hooden Horse is, frankly, ridiculous.".

== The John Brunt in the 21st century ==
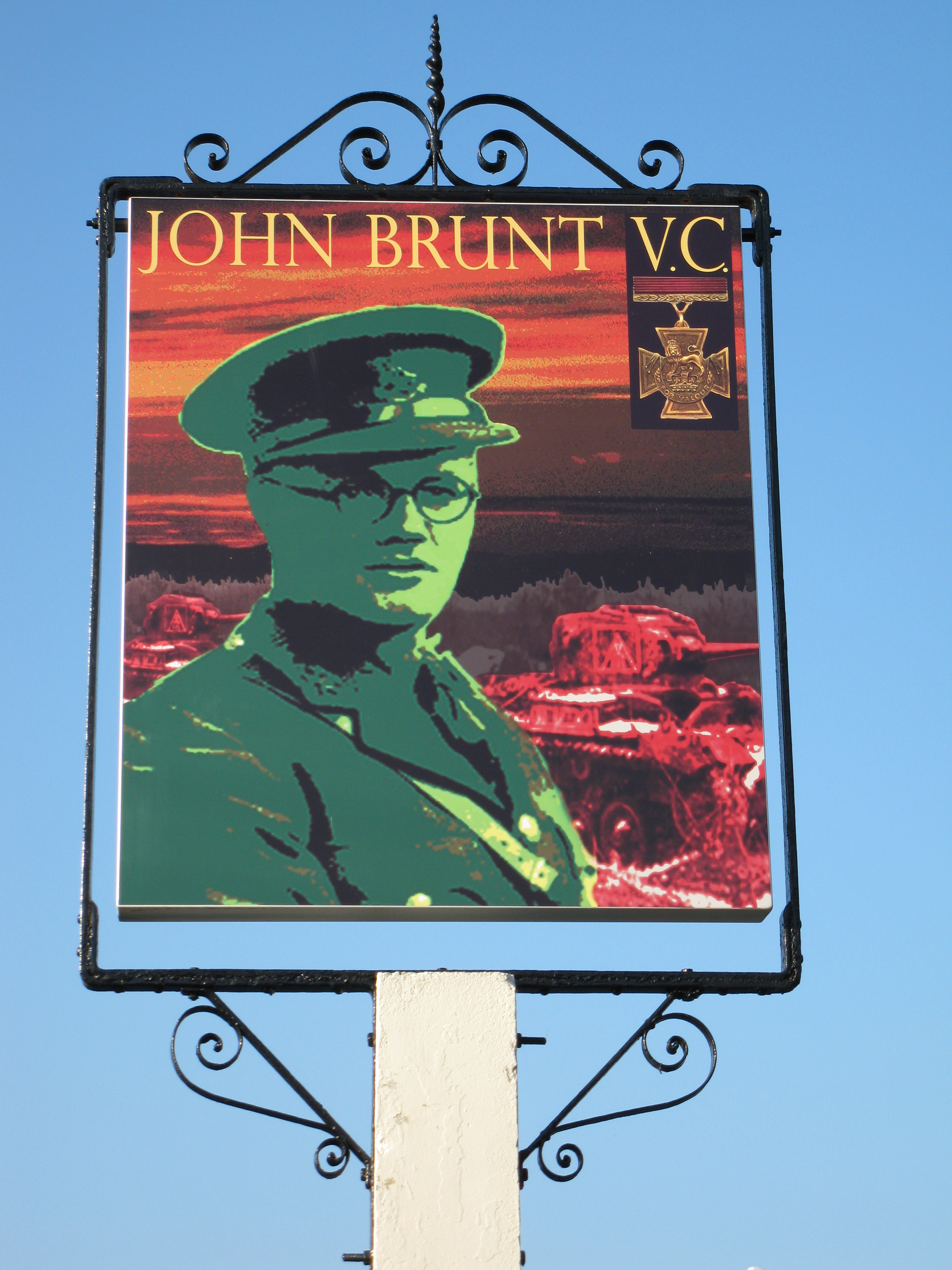
The new sign, unveiled on 9 November 2008

In June 2001 Rita and Terry Dixon took over the pub from Hooden Horse Inns and immediately decided to revert to the old name, which was greeted with enthusiasm by Paddock Wood residents. Several customers who had refused to drink there under the Hooden Horse name now returned (although even during that time, the pub was still known by local residents simply as The Brunt). Unfortunately the original signs had been lost when the pub changed its name, although the "John Brunt V.C." brass wording that used to hang on the outside wall was found at the nearby hop farm. On 9 November 2008, a new sign designed by Alex Atkinson, an art student at Mascalls School, was unveiled by Eric Knight, who knew John Brunt when at school.

In 2019 the pub was purchased by Star Pubs and Bars and in December that year closed for two months as work began on converting it into a gastropub at a cost of £480,000.
