= Wotherton =

Hamlet in Shropshire, England

Coordinates: 52.598°N 3.061°W

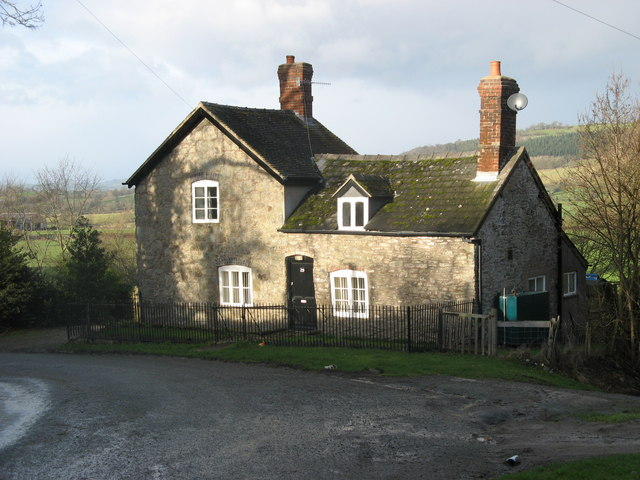
- Cottage in Wotherton

- Location within Shropshire
- OS grid reference: SJ281005
- Civil parish: Chirbury with Brompton
- Unitary authority: Shropshire
- Ceremonial county: Shropshire
- Region: West Midlands
- Country: England
- Sovereign state: United Kingdom
- Post town: MONTGOMERY
- Postcode district: SY15
- Dialling code: 01938
- Police: West Mercia
- Fire: Shropshire
- Ambulance: West Midlands
- UK Parliament: South Shropshire

Wotherton is a hamlet in west Shropshire, close to the Welsh border. It is in the civil parish of Chirbury with Brompton. Its name, mentioned as a manor in the Domesday Book means, roughly, "settlement at a woodland ford"; the road through the village crosses a small stream.

The Wotherton Barytes Mine operated here until 1911.

== See also ==
- Listed buildings in Chirbury with Brompton
