= Anna Bruns =

German politician (1937–2025)

Member of the Hamburg Parliament
- In office 1991–1998

Personal details
- Born: Anna von Bonin; 27 August 1937
- Died: 19 January 2025 (aged 87)
- Party: GAL

Anna Bruns (née von Bonin; 27 August 1937 – 19 January 2025) was a German politician. A member of the Green-Alternative List, she served in the Hamburg Parliament from 1991 to 1998.

Bruns died on 19 January 2025, at the age of 87.
