= John Brunt =

Recipient of the Victoria Cross (born 1922)

John Henry Cound Brunt
- Second Lieutenant John Brunt, pictured here in 1943, with the badges of the Sherwood Foresters.
- Born: 6 December 1922; Priest Weston, Shropshire, England
- Died: 10 December 1944 (aged 22); Faenza, Italy
- Burial place: Faenza War Cemetery, Italy
- Military career
- Allegiance: United Kingdom
- Branch: British Army
- Service years: 1941–1944
- Rank: Captain
- Service number: 258297
- Units: Queen's Own Royal West Kent Regiment; Sherwood Foresters, attached Lincolnshire Regiment
- Conflicts: Second World War: Italian campaign; Allied invasion of Italy; Operation Avalanche; Battle of the Bernhard Line (WIA); Battle of the Gothic Line †
- Awards: Victoria Cross; Military Cross

Captain John Henry Cound Brunt, VC, MC (6 December 1922 – 10 December 1944) was an English recipient of the Victoria Cross, the highest award for gallantry in the face of the enemy that can be awarded to British and Commonwealth forces.

He served in the Italian campaign during the Second World War and was twice decorated for bravery in action before he was killed by mortar fire the day after his VC action.

== Early life ==
John Henry Cound Brunt was born on 6 December 1922, on a farm in Priest Weston, near Chirbury, Shropshire to Thomas Henry Brunt and Nesta Mary Brunt (née Cound), and began his education at Chirbury village school. He had an elder sister named Dorothy (born 13 May 1920) and a younger sister, Isobel (born 5 October 1923). When Dorothy was eight, the family moved to a farm near Whittington, Shropshire, where John grew up. As he became older, his fearless nature became more apparent; every week, he read the comic Tiny Tots, which featured instructions on "How to teach yourself to swim". One day, he asked Dorothy to take him to the Shropshire Canal, which went through their farmland. Before his sister could stop him, Brunt had taken off all his clothes and jumped into the canal. When they finally arrived home, their mother wanted to know why he had no clothes on, and John responded that he had been teaching himself to swim. As he got older, his daredevil attitude became even more serious; on one occasion, he was found swinging himself along the guttering of a Dutch barn 60 feet (18 m) above the farmyard.

After attending the village school in Welsh Frankton, Brunt was enrolled at Ellesmere College, where his mischievous streak became quickly apparent through pranks and dares; once, while in the sanatorium with mumps, he slipped a laxative into the matron's tea. Nevertheless, he is fondly remembered at the school. It was while he was at Ellesmere that he contracted measles, resulting in his need to wear glasses. An enthusiastic sportsman, Brunt played cricket, hockey, rugby, water polo and wrestling. He was the only pupil at the school to tackle the headmaster while playing rugby, injuring the older man's knee in the process.

In 1934, the Brunt family moved to Paddock Wood in Kent and, in his school holidays, "Young John" (as he was known in the village) would come home. Although he was still a reckless individual, he was thought of very highly, and helped train the Paddock Wood Home Guard between 1940 and 1943, assisted by his father. He spent his last days in Paddock Wood helping with the hop harvest.

== Military career ==
John was one of the most popular officers in this Battalion, his light, energetic personality was a delight to all who met him... he carried out feats of daring that will long live in our memory.

— Lt. Col. F.C.L. Bell, Letter to John Brunt's parents

Brunt joined the British Army when he left school, training as a private soldier with the Queen's Own Royal West Kent Regiment in 1941, during the Second World War. He received a commission as a second lieutenant on 2 January 1943, and was posted to North Africa. Although he was commissioned in the Sherwood Foresters, he never served with them, instead being posted to the 6th Battalion, Lincolnshire Regiment (6th Lincolns), a Territorial Army (TA) unit, having become friendly with Captain Alan Money, an officer in the Lincolns, on the boat to North Africa. The battalion was part of the 138th Infantry Brigade of the 46th Infantry Division. The division was then commanded by Major General John Hawkesworth.

On 9 September 1943, Brunt's battalion landed at Salerno as part of the Allied invasion of Italy and Brunt, now a lieutenant, was given command of No.9 Platoon in 'A' Company. The unit subsequently moved south-east to establish a base on a farm near the river Asa.

=== Military Cross ===
Between December 1943 and January 1944, during the Bernhardt Line fighting, Brunt commanded a battle patrol and saw near-constant action. In the early hours of 15 December, they received orders to destroy an enemy post based in some houses 200 yards (180 m) north of the River Peccia. In efforts to break the enemy line, he crossed and re-crossed the river so many times that the troops took to calling it "Brunt's Brook". After an intense five-minute bombardment, Brunt led a section into an assault. The first two houses contained two enemy soldiers, but it was the third house that provided the most resistance. Using grenades and Tommy guns, they managed to kill eight enemy troops outside the house, as well as those inside, all belonging to the 1st Battalion, 2nd Hermann Goering Panzer Grenadier Regiment. After thirty minutes of intense fighting, the patrol withdrew, having had one man killed and six wounded. While the rest of the section pulled back, Brunt remained behind with his sergeant and a private to retrieve a wounded soldier. For his actions, he was awarded the Military Cross (MC).

On 5 January 1944, Brunt was in a sick bed in a rear hospital. He pleaded with doctors to be allowed to leave to take part in an attack, and was given permission, leading his patrol under heavy fire. He was back in the hospital 24 hours later with concussion after a piece of shrapnel almost split his helmet, but would have carried on fighting if it had not been for a non-commissioned officer (NCO), who forcibly led him away from the front line. At the end of the campaign, Brunt is said to have commented to his friends, "I've won the MC, now for the VC!"

=== Victoria Cross ===
Brunt's division left Italy in March 1944, and was sent to Syria and Egypt to rest and retrain, before returning to Italy in July 1944. Having been promoted to temporary captain, Brunt was appointed second-in-command (2IC) of 'D' Company. By early December 1944, after being engaged in heavy fighting in the Gothic Line offensive, the battalion was operating near Ravenna, fighting German troops who were retreating north through Italy. On the night of 3 December, the battalion began their attack on the city of Faenza. By the evening of 6 December, they had taken the village of Ragazzina near Faenza, and after heavy fighting, the 6th Lincolns established defensive positions in Faenza itself. For his actions during the engagement, Brunt was awarded the Victoria Cross (VC). The full citation for the award appeared in a supplement to the London Gazette of 6 February 1945, reading:

War Office, 8th February, 1945

The KING has been graciously pleased to approve the posthumous award of the VICTORIA CROSS to:—

Lieutenant (temporary Captain) John Henry Cound Brunt, M.C. (258297), The Sherwood Foresters (Nottinghamshire and Derbyshire Regiment) (Paddock Wood, Kent).

In Italy, on the 9th December, 1944, the Platoon commanded by Captain Brunt was holding a vital sector of the line.

At dawn the German 90 Panzer Grenadier Division counter-attacked the Battalion's forward positions in great strength with three Mark IV tanks and infantry. The house, around which the Platoon was dug in, was destroyed and the whole area was subjected to intense mortar fire. The situation then became critical, as the anti-tank defences had been destroyed and two Sherman tanks knocked out. Captain Brunt, however, rallied his remaining men, and, moving to an alternative position, continued to hold the enemy infantry, although outnumbered by at least three to one. Personally firing a Bren gun, Captain Brunt killed about fourteen of the enemy. His wireless set was destroyed by shell-fire, but on receiving a message by runner to withdraw to a Company locality some 200 yards to his left and rear, he remained behind to give covering fire. When his Bren ammunition was exhausted, he fired a PIAT and 2 in. Mortar, left by casualties, before he himself dashed over the open ground to the new position. This aggressive defence caused the enemy to pause, so Captain Brunt took a party back to his previous position, and although fiercely engaged by small arms fire, carried away the wounded who had been left there.

Later in the day, a further counter-attack was put in by the enemy on two axes. Captain Brunt immediately seized a spare Bren gun and, going round his forward positions, rallied his men. Then, leaping on a Sherman tank supporting the Company, he ordered the tank commander to drive from one fire position to another, whilst he sat, or stood, on the turret, directing Besa fire at the advancing enemy, regardless of the hail of small arms fire. Then, seeing small parties of the enemy, armed with bazookas, trying to approach round the left flank, he jumped off the tank and, taking a Bren gun, stalked these parties well in front of the Company positions, killing more and causing the enemy finally to withdraw in great haste leaving their dead behind them.

Wherever the fighting was heaviest, Captain Brunt was always to be found, moving from one post to another, encouraging the men and firing any weapon he found at any target he could see. The magnificent action fought by this Officer, his coolness, bravery, devotion to duty and complete disregard of his own personal safety under the most intense and concentrated fire was beyond praise. His personal example and individual action were responsible to a very great extent for the successful repulse of these fierce enemy counter-attacks.

The next day Captain Brunt was killed by mortar fire.

The next morning, having won the battle and the acclaim of his regiment, Captain Brunt was as eager to return to the offensive, keeping alert for more trouble as breakfast was being prepared for the men, their first meal in 48 hours. He was standing in the doorway of the platoon headquarters, having a mug of tea and chatting with friends, when a stray German mortar bomb landed at his feet, killing him outright. He had celebrated his 22nd birthday just four days before.

John Brunt is buried at Faenza War Cemetery in Italy under a Commonwealth War Grave headstone; his VC was announced posthumously in February 1945.

== Victoria Cross presentation ==
On 18 December 1945, King George VI presented Brunt's VC and MC to his parents at Buckingham Palace. Brunt's father met Field Marshal Sir Harold Alexander, the Commander-in-Chief (C-in-C) of the Allied Armies in Italy (AAI, later redesignated 15th Army Group) throughout most of the Italian Campaign, at the ceremony and said to him "I expect that you know many men who should have been awarded this medal", to which Alexander replied "No, because there is always only one who will do the unexpected and that day it was your son."

== Legacy ==
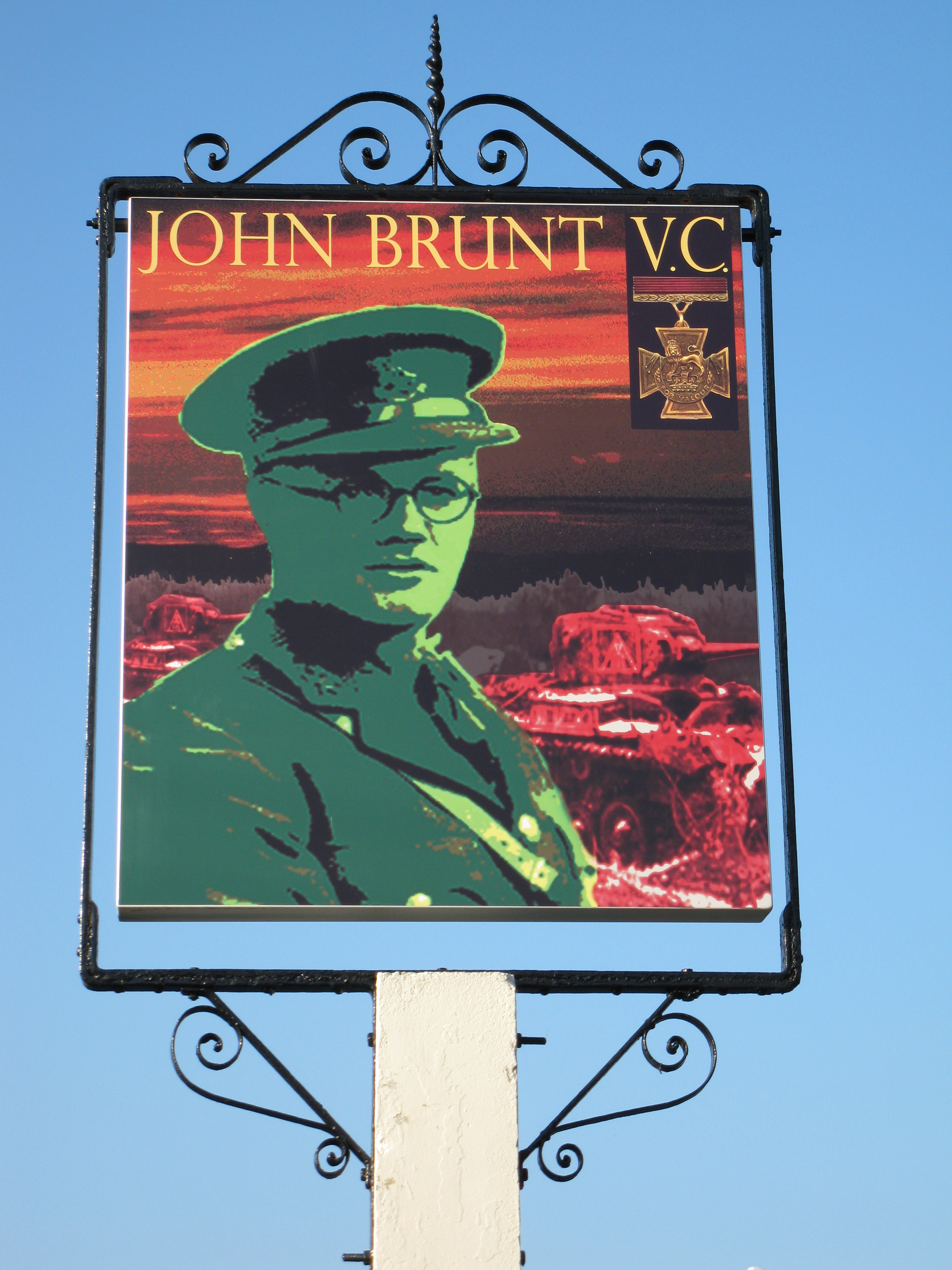
The new sign of the John Brunt V.C. pub in Paddock Wood, unveiled on 9 November 2008

In 1946, John Brunt's sister Dorothy gave birth to a boy which she named John Brunt Miller, in honour of his uncle.

On 3 September 1947 the Kent Arms public house in Paddock Wood, Kent, was renamed the John Brunt V.C. in his honour. In 1997, the pub's name was changed to The Hopping Hooden Horse; after local outrage, the former name was restored in 2001. Behind the pub, a small housing development called John Brunt VC Court was built. The rose window at the west end of St Andrew's Church in Paddock Wood was designed by Joan Howson in memory of Brunt.

During his military career, Brunt was awarded the VC, MC, 1939-45 Star, Africa Star, Italy Star and the British War Medal 1939–1945, all of which are on display in the Royal Lincolnshire Regiment and Lincolnshire Yeomanry Collections in the Museum of Lincolnshire Life in Lincoln. In 1951 an altar rail in the Soldiers' Chapel of St George in Lincoln Cathedral was dedicated to his memory by the regiment.

On 17 July 1965 The Victor comic featured a cover story named Brunt V.C., a two-page strip based on the actions that won Brunt the VC.

A John Brunt Memorial Cricket Pavilion was opened at Ellesmere College in 1970, after funds were raised for it since 1945. The college's ante-chapel holds a photograph of Brunt, with a copy of his VC citation displayed below.

In May 2004 an outdoor plaque to his memory was unveiled in Priestweston.
