= Stanley Brunst =

Canadian painter (1894–1962)

- Born: Stanley (Stanislau) Ernest Brunst; 1894; Birmingham, Warwickshire, England
- Died: 1962-01-06; Vancouver, British Columbia, Canada
- Occupation: Painter

Stanley Ernest Brunst (1894 – 6 January 1962) was a Canadian painter, best known for his early abstractions.

== Career ==
Brunst was born in Birmingham, England and came to Canada with his family at around the age of 18. In Saskatoon in 1923 where he worked in construction and then as a dry-cleaner. He studied at the University of Saskatchewan with Augustus Kenderdine in an evening class for four years in the 1930s but was mainly self-taught. In 1936, he began to paint abstractly. He moved to Vancouver in 1941, held three solo shows at the Vancouver Art Gallery and was a founding member of the Federation of Canadian Artists (1941). He was also a member of the B.C. Society of Artists. He died in Vancouver. In 1982, the Mendel Art Gallery organized a retrospective of his work titled Stanley E. Brunst, Radical Painter: An Exhibition.

== Selected public collections ==
- Art Gallery of Alberta;
- Dunlop Art Gallery;
- Remai Modern, Saskatoon;
- Vancouver Art Gallery;
