= Victor von Bruns =

German surgeon

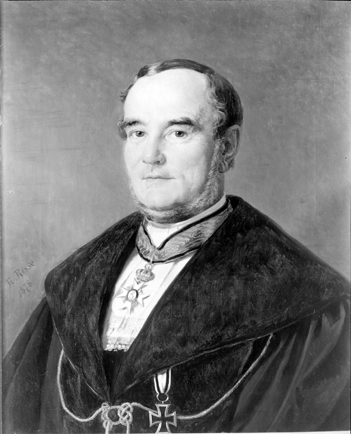
Victor von Bruns

Victor von Bruns (9 August 1812 – 19 March 1883) was a German surgeon born in Helmstedt.

He studied at Braunschweig, Tübingen, Halle and Berlin, and from 1843 to 1882 was a professor of surgery at the University of Tübingen. His son, Paul von Bruns (1846-1916) was also a professor of surgery at Tübingen. In 1872 he was a founding member of the German Society of Surgery.

Bruns was a leading authority in the field of plastic and reconstructive surgery, particularly known for his work in lip and cheek reconstruction. He is also known for his pioneer work in laryngology, and was among the first to perform operations for laryngeal polyps and tumors.

Bruns popularized usage of absorbent cotton wool dressings, which later became a standard practice in modern antiseptic treatment of wounds.

He died in Tübingen.

== Written works ==
- Handbuch der praktischen Chirurgie (Textbook of practical surgery); Tübingen 1854-60, two volumes, with atlas 1853 ff.
- Durchschneidung der Gesichtsnerven beim Gesichtsschmerz; (Transection of the facial nerve for treatment of facial pain); Tübingen 1859
- Behandlung schlecht geheilter Beinbrüche (Treatment of poorly healed bone fractures); Berlin 1861
- Die erste Ausrottung eines Polypen in der Kehlkopfhöhle ohne blutige Eröffnung der Luftwege (Treatise on removal of a laryngeal polyp), (two editions- Tübingen 1862; Nachtrag 1863)
- Chirurgische Heilmittellehre (Surgical therapy instruction); Tübingen 1868-73
- Arzneioperationen oder Darstellung sämtlicher Methoden der manuellen Applikation von Arzneistoffen; Tübingen 1869
- Die Laryngoskopie und laryngoskopische Chirurgie (Laryngoscopy and laryngoscopic surgery); Tübingen 1865, with atlas; second edition- 1873
- Die Galvano-Chirurgie (Electrosurgery); Tübingen 1870
- Die galvanokaustischen Apparate und Instrumente (Galvano-caustic apparatus and instruments); Tübingen 1878
- Die Amputation der Gliedmaßen durch Zirkelschnitt mit vordern Hautlappen; Tübingen 1879
