= Tissy Bruns =

German journalist

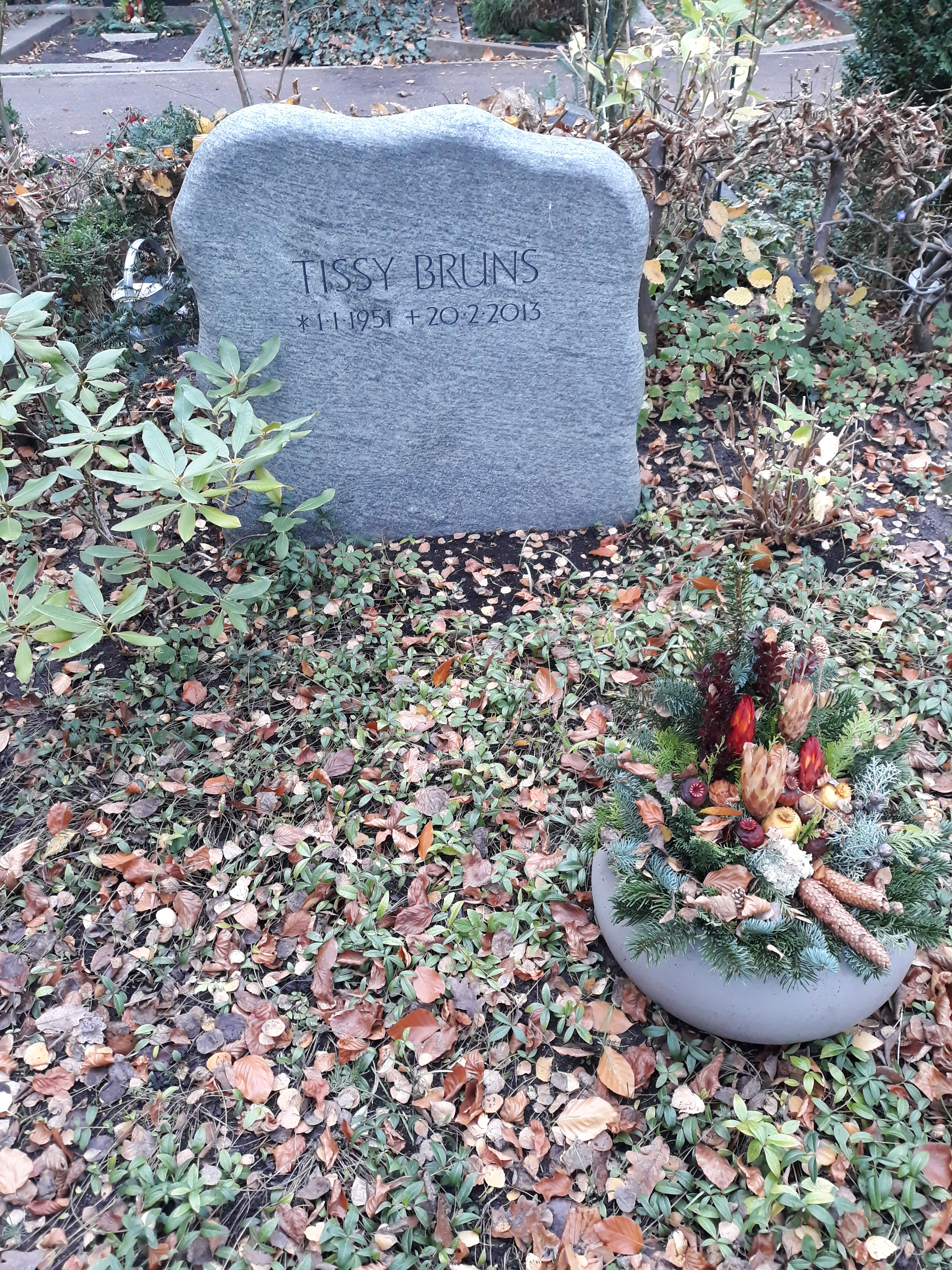
Tissy Bruns's grave at the Schöneberg III cemetery in Berlin-Friedenau.

Christiane "Tissy" Bruns (1 January 1951, Zeitz – 20 February 2013) was a German journalist. From 1999 to 2003, she was chairwoman of the Association of the Federal Press Conference.

== Life ==
At the age of six, she moved with her family from East Germany to West Germany. She completed a teaching degree for elementary and secondary schools with the subjects history and mathematics and during her studies in the 1970s was a member of the leadership of the Marxist Student Union Spartakus (MSB). From 1975 to 1977, she was a consultant to the board of the Vereinigte Deutsche Studentenschaften (VDS); after completing her legal clerkship, she was the first woman to be a member of the VDS board from 1979. After leaving the VDS, she worked for the DKP party executive from 1981 and was a member of the Marxistischer Studentenbund Spartakus. She left the party in 1989. She had clearly distanced herself from communism and the DKP since this time.

From 1984 she worked as a journalist, initially for the Deutsche Volkszeitung. From 1991 until the parliament moved to Berlin in the summer of 1999, she was a parliamentary correspondent in Bonn, writing first for Die Tageszeitung, later for Stern and then Wochenpost.

From 1997 she was a correspondent for the Der Tagesspiegel. From April 2001 to April 2003, she headed the Berlin correspondent's office of the daily newspaper Die Welt, after which she moved back to the Tagesspiegel.

An extensive interview she gave with Franz Müntefering was published in his 2008 book Macht Politik! She had lived in Berlin since 1999 and died of cancer in 2013.

== Publications ==
- Tissy Bruns (2007), Republik der Wichtigtuer (Ein Bericht aus Berlin), Freiburg im Breisgau: Herder, ISBN 978-3-451-28715-2

== Literature ==
- Irmela Hannover, Cordt Schnibben: I can't get no. A few 68ers meet again and settle accounts. Kiepenheuer & Witsch, Cologne 2007, ISBN 978-3-462-03905-4 – pp. 29, 362 et al.
- Jens Spahn: ... ob du Huhn bist oder Hahn!" – Portrait of a special carp – Tissy Bruns. In: Schmierfinken : Politicians about journalists. Edited by Maybrit Illner and Hajo Schumacher. Heyne, Munich 2009, ISBN 978-3-453-62037-7.
