= Brompton, Shropshire =

Hamlet in Shropshire, England

Coordinates: 52.531°N 3.106°W

Brompton
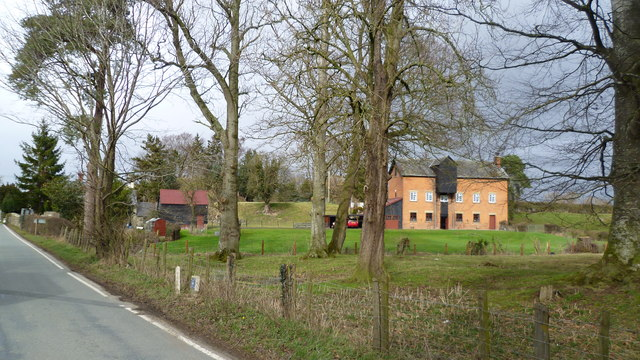
- View to Brompton motte and bailey castle

- Location within Shropshire
- OS grid reference: SO249931
- Civil parish: Chirbury with Brompton
- Unitary authority: Shropshire
- Ceremonial county: Shropshire
- Region: West Midlands
- Country: England
- Sovereign state: United Kingdom
- Post town: MONTGOMERY
- Postcode district: SY15
- Dialling code: 01588
- Police: West Mercia
- Fire: Shropshire
- Ambulance: West Midlands
- UK Parliament: Ludlow

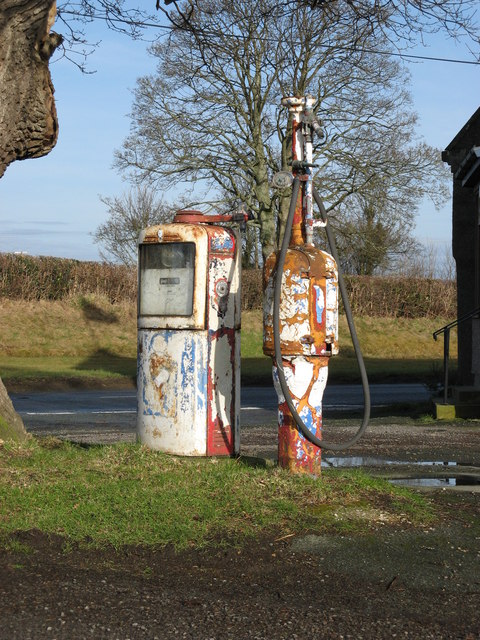
Antique petrol pumps standing at the junction of the A489 and B4385, Brompton, Shropshire.

Brompton (Welsh: Brontyn) is a hamlet in Shropshire, England. It lies on the A489 between Church Stoke and Newtown (both in Powys) at its junction with the B4385. The hamlet is notable for the fact that it is impossible to reach any other settlement in England (except Pentreheyling) by road without first passing through Wales. Public footpaths are the only access which links it with the rest of England. It is, however, not geographically an exclave. It is also notable as having Welsh language road signage on the B4385 heading south into Powys, unique in England.

Brompton is in the civil parish of Chirbury with Brompton; in 1987 the parishes of Chirbury and Brompton and Rhiston merged to form the present-day civil parish. Earlier Brompton was a township in the English portion of the parish of Church Stoke. Brompton remains in a separate ecclesiastical parish to Chirbury however.

The remains of three Roman marching camps have been found near Brompton. The hamlet lies on Offa's Dyke, and the Offa's Dyke Path passes through. There is also an earthwork motte, which was in existence by 1225.

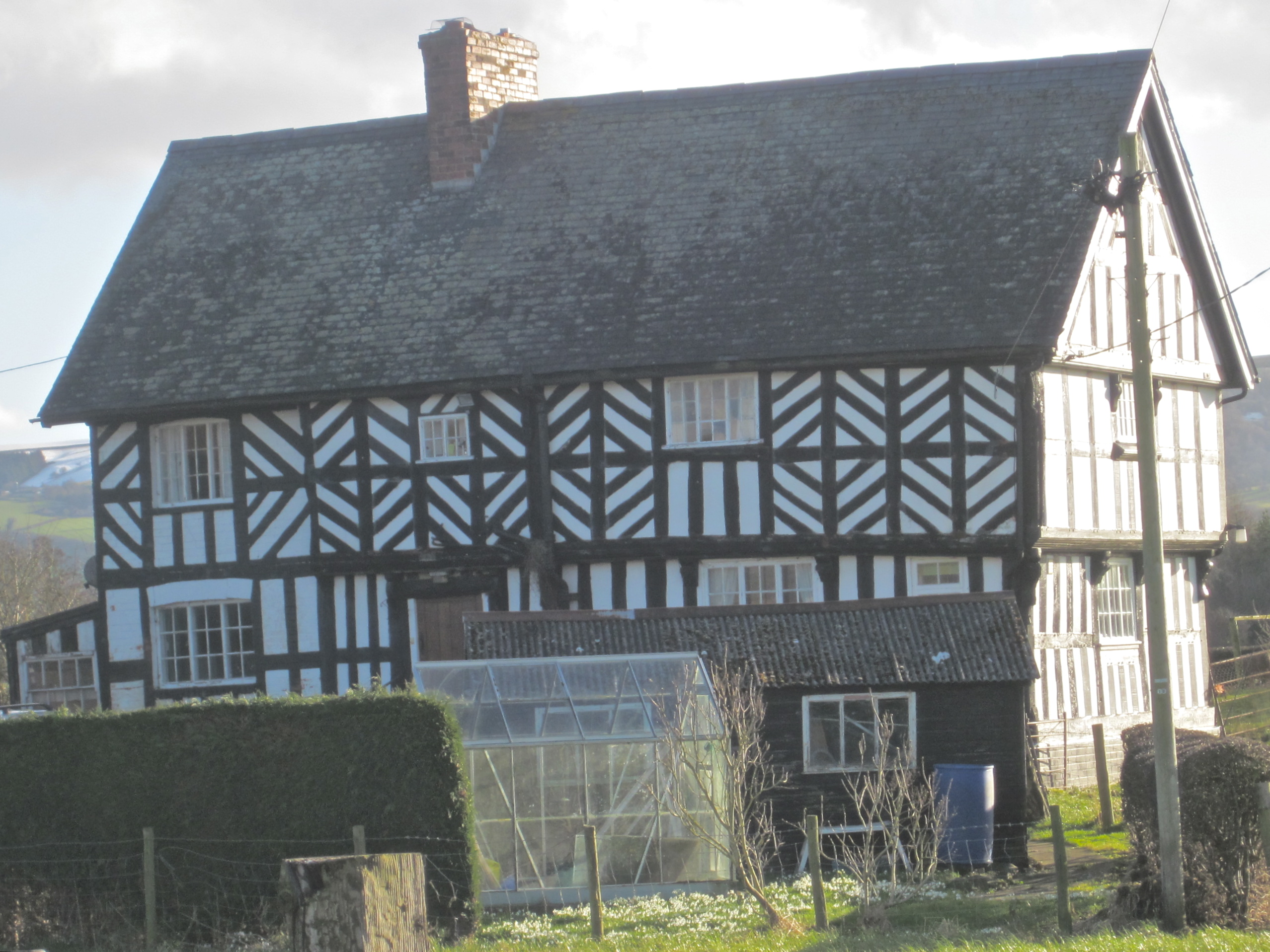
The Lack, Brompton

The Lack is a Grade II* listed building, formerly in the historic parish of Churchstoke but now in the parish of Chirbury with Brompton. It is likely to have been built in the latter part of the 16th. century.

Situated by the crossroads, there was a public house called the Blue Bell, which closed in 2020 when the landlady died.

== See also ==
- Listed buildings in Chirbury with Brompton
