= Marton, Shropshire =

Village in Shropshire, England

Coordinates: 52.616°N 3.055°W

Marton
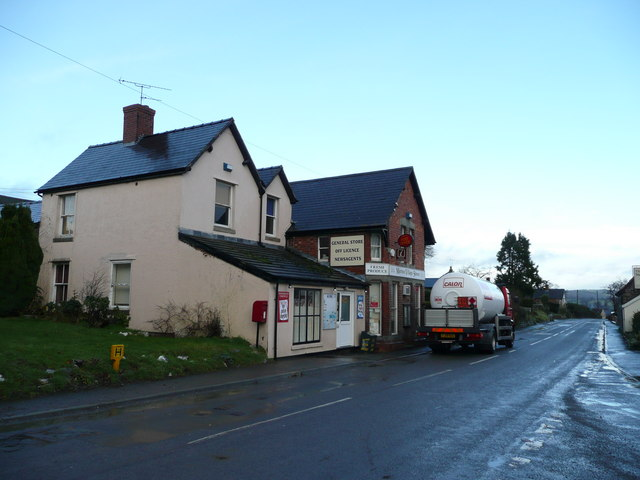
- The post office at Marton, Shropshire

- Location within Shropshire
- OS grid reference: SJ287025
- Civil parish: Chirbury with Brompton
- Unitary authority: Shropshire
- Ceremonial county: Shropshire
- Region: West Midlands
- Country: England
- Sovereign state: United Kingdom
- Post town: WELSHPOOL
- Postcode district: SY21
- Dialling code: 01938
- Police: West Mercia
- Fire: Shropshire
- Ambulance: West Midlands
- UK Parliament: Ludlow

Marton, also known as Marton-in-Chirbury, is a small village in Shropshire, England, 8 km (5.0 mi) southeast of Welshpool, and has a nearby lake called Marton Pool. There is another Marton in Shropshire, near Baschurch, at OS grid reference SJ443239, which also has a nearby Marton Pool.

Marton forms part of the civil parish of Chirbury with Brompton, and Marton is a parish ward within that parish, returning 3 councillors.

The B4386 road (which runs between Montgomery and Shrewsbury) passes through the village. The border with Powys is close by.

There are two public houses in the Marton area: the Lowfield Inn (outside the village towards Shrewsbury) and the Sun Inn (within the village). Opposite the Sun Inn is a convenience store. There is an Anglican church dedicated to St Mark, and a nonconformist chapel built in 1829 as 'Independent' (later known as Congregationalist). By the chapel is the village hall.

Marton Pool is a body of water near the village, which is the source of the Rea Brook. It is a Site of Special Scientific Interest. The village's name derives from mere + ton. The lake is fed mainly by the Lowerfield Brook on the north side. The Rea Brook exits at the east through a sluice, which is in disrepair. At the southwest is a drainage ditch leading from a blocked culvert under a road; this point is about 2m higher than the lake; another ditch flows southwest from the same point; on maps, this gives the false impression of the lake flowing into a tributary of the Aylesford Brook.

Notable clergyman Thomas Bray (1656-1730) was born in Marton in a half-timbered house called Bray's Tenement.

== See also ==
- Listed buildings in Chirbury with Brompton
