= List of prehistoric scheduled monuments in Powys (Montgomeryshire) =

Scheduled monuments in Montgomeryshire, Powys, Wales.
=Neolithic =Bronze Age =Iron Age

Powys is the largest administrative county in Wales. With over a quarter of Wales's land area, and covering much of the eastern half of the country, it is a county of remote uplands, low population and no coastline. It was created in more or less its current form in 1974, and is the only one of the large county units created at that time to have been carried forward intact at the 1996 local government re-organisation. It comprises three historic counties, namely Montgomeryshire, Radnorshire, and most of Brecknockshire. There are 950 scheduled monuments within the county, which is far more than can be sensibly covered in one list. Each of the three historic counties is therefore listed separately, and each of these has two lists - one for the prehistoric sites and one for the Roman, medieval and post-medieval sites.

This list shows the many prehistoric sites in Montgomeryshire, the northern third of Powys. Of the 303 scheduled monuments in the Montgomeryshire area 190 date to prehistoric periods. Of these, only two are known to be Neolithic. A remarkable 117 are likely to date from the Bronze Age, mainly burial sites of various sorts but also including 23 standing stones, stones circles and stone alignments. There are 70 Iron Age hillforts, defensive enclosures and hut sites.

The lists of scheduled monuments in Powys are as follows:-

- List of prehistoric scheduled monuments in Powys (Brecknockshire) (254 sites)
- List of Roman-to-modern scheduled monuments in Powys (Brecknockshire) (135 sites)
- List of prehistoric scheduled monuments in Powys (Radnorshire) (139 sites)
- List of Roman-to-modern scheduled monuments in Powys (Radnorshire) (119 sites)
- List of prehistoric scheduled monuments in Powys (Montgomeryshire) (190 sites - shown below)
- List of Roman-to-modern scheduled monuments in Powys (Montgomeryshire) (113 sites)

Scheduled monuments have statutory protection. It is illegal to disturb the ground surface or any standing remains. The compilation of the list is undertaken by Cadw Welsh Historic Monuments, which is an executive agency of the National Assembly of Wales. The list of scheduled monuments below is supplied by Cadw with additional material from RCAHMW and Clwyd-Powys Archaeological Trust.

== Scheduled prehistoric monuments in Montgomeryshire ==
The list is sorted by date, and then by Community so that sites of similar age and locality are placed near each other. Clicking on the heading arrows will sort the list by that information.

Image	Name	Site type	Community	Location	Details	Period	SAM No & Refs
	New House 'Long Barrow'	Long barrow	Churchstoke	52.5694°N 3.0332°W, SO300973	Formerly considered to be a Neolithic long barrow, a 2012 excavation by Bradford University found that the site was a natural outcrop with a small area of quarrying, and no sign of burials. However the site remains scheduled.	Prehistoric /Modern	MG285
	Cursus, Llwyn-Wron	Cursus	Welshpool	52.6353°N 3.1593°W, SJ216047	Crop mark revealed by aerial photography, showing a ring ditch some 20m in diameter.	Prehistoric (Bronze Age)	MG167
	Careg Lwyd 800m ESE of Bwlch-y-Ffridd	Boundary stone	Aberhafesp	52.5478°N 3.3582°W, SO080953		Prehistoric	MG041
	Llyn y Tarw Ritual Complex	Stone circle	Aberhafesp	52.5673°N 3.4393°W, SO025975		Prehistoric	MG258
	Pen y Groes Uchaf Cairn	Round cairn	Aberhafesp	52.5743°N 3.43°W, SO031983		Prehistoric	MG261
	Boncyn y Llwyn round cairn	Round cairn	Banwy	52.6853°N 3.5198°W, SH973108		Prehistoric	MG268
	Cae'r Lloi Round Barrow	Round barrow	Banwy	52.7013°N 3.5508°W, SH953126		Prehistoric	MG273
	Cae'r-Mynach Round Cairn	Round cairn	Banwy	52.7228°N 3.4242°W, SJ039148		Prehistoric	MG128
	Llechwedd Du Round Cairn	Round cairn	Banwy	52.7341°N 3.5304°W, SH967162		Prehistoric	MG270
	Mynydd Dyfnant Stone Alignment	Stone alignment	Banwy	52.7299°N 3.5042°W, SH985157		Prehistoric	MG134
	Pencad Cymru Cairn	Round cairn	Banwy	52.6722°N 3.4961°W, SH989093		Prehistoric	MG164
	Tryfel Cairns and Stone Setting	Round cairn	Banwy	52.733°N 3.5269°W, SH969161		Prehistoric	MG269
	Dyffryn Lane Ring Ditches & Pit Alignments (Formerly Dyffryn Lane Round Barrow)	Round barrow	Berriew	52.6057°N 3.176°W, SJ204015		Prehistoric	MG157
	Maen Beuno	Standing stone	Berriew	52.6036°N 3.1785°W, SJ202012		Prehistoric	MG042
	Afon Hyddgen stone row	Stone row	Cadfarch	52.4892°N 3.797°W, SN780894		Prehistoric	MG309
	Banc Llechwedd-mawr round cairns	Round cairn	Cadfarch	52.4926°N 3.8052°W, SN775898		Prehistoric	MG307
	Carn Gwilym Round Cairns	Round cairn	Cadfarch	52.5019°N 3.7805°W, SN792908		Prehistoric	MG104
	Craig y Dullfan ring cairn	Ring cairn	Cadfarch	52.4829°N 3.8109°W, SN771887		Prehistoric	MG308
	Esgair y Ffordd ring cairn	Ring cairn	Cadfarch	52.5155°N 3.7829°W, SN791923		Prehistoric	MG310
	Foel Fadian Round Barrow	Round barrow	Cadfarch	52.5454°N 3.7226°W, SN832955		Prehistoric	MG108
	Carreg Hir Standing Stone	Standing stone	Caersws	52.5606°N 3.4557°W, SO014968		Prehistoric	MG275
	Craig y Llyn Mawr platform cairn and standing stone	Platform Cairn	Caersws	52.5638°N 3.4738°W, SO001972		Prehistoric	MG328
	Craig y Llyn Mawr Round Cairn	Round cairn	Caersws	52.5722°N 3.4774°W, SN999981		Prehistoric	MG277
	Lluest Uchaf Cairns and Stone Row	Stone row	Caersws	52.5736°N 3.4763°W, SO000983		Prehistoric	MG276
	Llyn y Tarw Cairn	Round cairn	Caersws	52.5668°N 3.4467°W, SO020975		Prehistoric	MG259
	Nant Cwm Gerwyn Cairns	Kerb cairn	Caersws	52.5762°N 3.4835°W, SN995986		Prehistoric	MG278
	Ring Cairn 540m SW of Llyn y Tarw	Ring cairn	Caersws	52.5619°N 3.4564°W, SO013969		Prehistoric	MG180
	Blaen y Cwm Ring Cairn	Ring cairn	Carno	52.5765°N 3.5038°W, SN981986		Prehistoric	MG279
	Blaen y Cwm Round Cairns	Round cairn	Carno	52.5511°N 3.5922°W, SN921960		Prehistoric	MG293
	Bryn y Gadair Round Cairn	Round cairn	Carno	52.535°N 3.5306°W, SN962941		Prehistoric	MG331
	Bryn yr Aran Ring Cairn and Ritual Platform	Ring cairn	Carno	52.5495°N 3.5761°W, SN932957		Prehistoric	MG304
	Bryn yr Aran Stone Setting	Stone setting	Carno	52.5481°N 3.572°W, SN934956		Prehistoric	MG296
	Carreg Lwyd Ritual Complex	Stone row	Carno	52.5487°N 3.5952°W, SN919957		Prehistoric	MG291
	Esgair Draenllwyn Round Cairn I	Round cairn	Carno	52.5371°N 3.5843°W, SN926944		Prehistoric	MG294
	Esgair Draenllwyn Round Cairn II	Round cairn	Carno	52.5407°N 3.5797°W, SN929948		Prehistoric	MG295
	Esgair Draenllwyn Stone Setting	Stone setting	Carno	52.5428°N 3.5789°W, SN930950		Prehistoric	MG297
	Corndon Hill Round Cairns	Round cairn	Churchstoke	52.5643°N 3.0211°W, SO309967		Prehistoric	MG111
	Round Barrow on Saddle to E of Corndon Hill	Round barrow	Churchstoke	52.5644°N 3.0342°W, SO299967		Prehistoric	MG329
	Mynydd Bwlch-y-gors Standing Stone	Standing stone	Dwyriw	52.5768°N 3.4267°W, SO034986		Prehistoric	MG326
	Mynydd y Gribin kerb cairn	Kerb cairn	Dwyriw	52.6091°N 3.4518°W, SJ017022		Prehistoric	MG327
	Pen y Groes Isaf Round Cairn	Round cairn	Dwyriw	52.5775°N 3.4244°W, SO035986		Prehistoric	MG289
	Y Capel Stone Circle	Stone circle	Dwyriw	52.5894°N 3.4785°W, SH999000		Prehistoric	MG179
	Trelystan Church House Round Barrows	Round barrow	Forden with Leighton and Trelystan	52.6369°N 3.0941°W, SJ260049		Prehistoric	MG286
	Moel Eiddew platform cairn	Platform Cairn	Glantwymyn	52.6319°N 3.6779°W, SH865051		Prehistoric	MG312
	Moelfre round barrow	Round barrow	Glantwymyn	52.5708°N 3.7011°W, SN848983		Prehistoric	MG311
	Rhos-Dyrnog Standing Stone	Standing stone	Glantwymyn	52.5903°N 3.7319°W, SH827005		Prehistoric	MG147
	Barrow west of Cae-Betin Wood	Round barrow	Kerry	52.4692°N 3.2884°W, SO125864		Prehistoric	MG257
	Block Wood Round Barrow	Round barrow	Kerry	52.4683°N 3.2488°W, SO152863		Prehistoric	MG256
	Bryn Cwmyrhiwdre Round Barrow	Round barrow	Kerry	52.4456°N 3.3552°W, SO079839		Prehistoric	MG280
	Crugyn Round Barrows	Round barrow	Kerry	52.4632°N 3.3196°W, SO104858		Prehistoric	MG122
	Glog Round Barrows	Round barrow	Kerry	52.4587°N 3.3374°W, SO092853		Prehistoric	MG121
	Kerry Hill Stone Circle	Stone circle	Kerry	52.4661°N 3.2413°W, SO158861		Prehistoric	MG055
	Round Barrow S of Ciderhouse Wood	Round barrow	Kerry	52.4467°N 3.3145°W, SO107840		Prehistoric	MG109
	Site 450m NW of Glan Mule (revealed by aerial photography)	Ring ditch	Kerry	52.5073°N 3.2306°W, SO165906		Prehistoric	MG172
	Two Tumps Round Barrows	Round barrow	Kerry	52.4567°N 3.2998°W, SO118851		Prehistoric	MG048
	Bryn y Fedwen Round Barrows	Round barrow	Llanbrynmair	52.5435°N 3.711°W, SN841953		Prehistoric	MG107
	Ceffig Caerau Stone Circle	Stone circle	Llanbrynmair	52.5913°N 3.621°W, SH902005		Prehistoric	MG066
	Ffridd Cwm y Ffynnon round barrow	Round barrow	Llanbrynmair	52.6318°N 3.5997°W, SH918049		Prehistoric	MG314
	Ffridd yr Ystrad Cairns	Round cairn	Llanbrynmair	52.5787°N 3.5969°W, SN918990		Prehistoric	MG265
	Lled Croen-yr-Ych Stone Circle	Stone circle	Llanbrynmair	52.5918°N 3.6193°W, SH904005		Prehistoric	MG068
	Mynydd Lluest Fach barrow cemetery	Ring cairn	Llanbrynmair	52.6596°N 3.6297°W, SH898081		Prehistoric	MG313
	Twr Gwyn Mawr Round Cairn	Round cairn	Llanbrynmair	52.5504°N 3.597°W, SN918959		Prehistoric	MG292
	Yr Allor Cairn	Ring cairn	Llanbrynmair	52.5903°N 3.6274°W, SH898004		Prehistoric	MG209
	Allt Gethin Round Cairn	Round cairn	Llandinam	52.4757°N 3.4216°W, SO035873		Prehistoric	MG303
	Bryn Hafod Standing Stone	Standing stone	Llandinam	52.404°N 3.445°W, SO017794		Prehistoric	MG298
	Crugyn Llwyd	Round barrow	Llandinam	52.4059°N 3.4361°W, SO024796		Prehistoric	MG127
	Domen Ddu Round Barrow	Round barrow	Llandinam	52.4345°N 3.4386°W, SO022828		Prehistoric	MG079
	Pegwn Bach Round Barrow	Round cairn	Llandinam	52.4143°N 3.4458°W, SO017805		Prehistoric	MG126
	Pegwn Mawr Round Barrows	Round cairn	Llandinam	52.4204°N 3.4367°W, SO023812		Prehistoric	MG125
	Polyn y Groes Ddu Round Cairn II	Round cairn	Llandinam	52.4421°N 3.4192°W, SO036836		Prehistoric	MG290
	Polyn y Groes-Ddu Round Barrow, Waun Lluest Owain	Round barrow	Llandinam	52.4419°N 3.4196°W, SO036836		Prehistoric	MG086
	Gelli Gethin Round Cairn	Round cairn	Llanfair Caereinion	52.6426°N 3.4163°W, SJ042059		Prehistoric	MG272
	Cil Haul Barrow	Round barrow	Llanfyllin	52.7826°N 3.3844°W, SJ067214		Prehistoric	MG274
	Carn Bwlch y Cloddiau, Esgair Wen	Round cairn	Llangurig	52.3942°N 3.6859°W, SN853786		Prehistoric	MG087
	Carn Fach, Esgair Wen	Round cairn	Llangurig	52.3991°N 3.6812°W, SN857792		Prehistoric	MG088
	Craig y Lluest cairn cemetery	Round cairn	Llangurig	52.3687°N 3.6909°W, SN849758		Prehistoric	MG321
	Domen Glw Cairn	Round cairn	Llangurig	52.4233°N 3.6091°W, SN906818		Prehistoric	MG267
	Craig Ty Glas Kerb Cairn	Kerb cairn	Llangynog	52.8371°N 3.4375°W, SJ032275		Prehistoric	MG299
	Cwm Rhiwiau Stone Circle	Stone circle	Llangynog	52.8643°N 3.3988°W, SJ059305		Prehistoric	MG263
	Pen Cerrig Standing Stone	Standing stone	Llangynog	52.8387°N 3.4803°W, SJ003278		Prehistoric	MG300
	Y Gribin Round Cairn	Round cairn	Llangynog	52.8279°N 3.4297°W, SJ037265		Prehistoric	MG334
	Carreg Wen Prehistoric Standing Stone	Standing stone	Llanidloes Without	52.4823°N 3.7254°W, SN829885		Prehistoric	MG252
	Cwmbiga long cairn	Long cairn	Llanidloes Without	52.4873°N 3.675°W, SN863890		Prehistoric	MG323
	Afon Disgynfa Cairn	Round cairn	Llanrhaeadr-ym-Mochnant	52.8569°N 3.382°W, SJ070297		Prehistoric	MG264
	Cadair Berwyn, round cairn on N ridge of	Round cairn	Llanrhaeadr-ym-Mochnant, (also Ceiriog Ucha), (see also Wrexham)	52.8923°N 3.3697°W, SJ079336	formerly in historic Denbighshire	Prehistoric	DE297
	Craig Berwyn Round Barrow	Round barrow	Llanrhaeadr-ym-Mochnant	52.8816°N 3.381°W, SJ071324	formerly in historic Denbighshire	Prehistoric	DE090
	Glan Hafon Ring Cairn	Ring cairn	Llanrhaeadr-ym-Mochnant	52.8385°N 3.3802°W, SJ071276		Prehistoric	MG302
	Maes Mochnant Isaf Round Barrow	Round barrow	Llanrhaeadr-ym-Mochnant	52.8143°N 3.2805°W, SJ137248	formerly in historic Denbighshire	Prehistoric	DE279
	Maes-Mochnant Standing Stone	Standing stone	Llanrhaeadr-ym-Mochnant	52.814°N 3.282°W, SJ136248	formerly in historic Denbighshire	Prehistoric	DE089
	Moel Sych Round Barrow	Round barrow	Llanrhaeadr-ym-Mochnant, (also Llandrillo), (see also Denbighshire)	52.8761°N 3.3887°W, SJ066318	formerly in historic Denbighshire	Prehistoric	DE067
	Nant y Gangen Ddu Round Cairns	Round cairn	Llanrhaeadr-ym-Mochnant	52.8309°N 3.3745°W, SJ074268		Prehistoric	MG301
	Rhos-y-Beddau Stone Circle, Avenue and Cairn	Stone circle	Llanrhaeadr-ym-Mochnant	52.8613°N 3.3996°W, SJ058302		Prehistoric	MG032
	Y Foel Ddu Round Barrow	Round barrow	Llanrhaeadr-ym-Mochnant	52.8769°N 3.2981°W, SJ127318	formerly in historic Denbighshire	Prehistoric	DE276
	Ysgwennant Barrow	Round barrow	Llansilin	52.8662°N 3.2052°W, SJ189305	formerly in historic Denbighshire	Prehistoric	DE277
	Cedig Cairn	Round cairn	Llanwddyn	52.8015°N 3.4856°W, SH999237		Prehistoric	MG306
	Chambered Cairn above Afon y Dolau Gwynion, NE of Lake Vyrnwy	Chambered round cairn	Llanwddyn	52.7958°N 3.4559°W, SJ019230		Prehistoric	MG227
	Creigiau'r Llyn cairn cemetery	Round cairn	Llanwddyn	52.7811°N 3.536°W, SH964214		Prehistoric	MG319
	Croes y Forwyn cairns	Round cairn	Llanwddyn	52.7749°N 3.4442°W, SJ026206		Prehistoric	MG262
	Maes Dyfnant Round Cairn	Round cairn	Llanwddyn	52.7352°N 3.4606°W, SJ014162		Prehistoric	MG133
	Clawdd Wood Round Barrow	Round barrow	Meifod	52.6898°N 3.2416°W, SJ161109		Prehistoric	MG330
	Round Barrow 225m SE of Clwyd-yr-onen	Round barrow	Meifod	52.7003°N 3.2079°W, SJ184120		Prehistoric	MG095
	Afon y Dolau Gwynion Kerb Cairn	Kerb cairn	Pen-y-Bont-Fawr	52.7959°N 3.4474°W, SJ025230		Prehistoric	MG318
	Bwlch Sych Round Cairn	Round cairn	Pen-y-Bont-Fawr	52.8024°N 3.4456°W, SJ026237		Prehistoric	MG315
	Carnedd Cerrig kerb cairn	Kerb cairn	Pen-y-Bont-Fawr	52.7964°N 3.4412°W, SJ029230		Prehistoric	MG317
	Carnedd Das Eithin Round Cairn	Round cairn	Pen-y-Bont-Fawr	52.8041°N 3.4086°W, SJ051238		Prehistoric	MG271
	Siglem Las Conjoined Round Cairns	Round cairn	Pen-y-Bont-Fawr	52.8002°N 3.4462°W, SJ025234		Prehistoric	MG316
	Maen Hir cairn cemetery	Kerb cairn	Rhayader	52.3696°N 3.6794°W, SN857759		Prehistoric	MG322
	Barrow Group W of Staylittle	Round barrow	Trefeglwys	52.5146°N 3.6563°W, SN877920		Prehistoric	MG171
	Carn Biga, Pumlumon Farw/Plynlimon	Round cairn	Trefeglwys	52.4947°N 3.7242°W, SN830899		Prehistoric	MG110
	Carn Fach Bugeilyn	Round cairn	Trefeglwys, (also Blaenrheidol), (see also Ceredigion)	52.4986°N 3.7304°W, SN826903		Prehistoric	MG113
	Cefn Llwyd Round Barrow and standing stone	Round barrow	Trefeglwys	52.5149°N 3.6993°W, SN848921		Prehistoric	MG266
	Y Ffridd Round Barrow	Round barrow	Trefeglwys	52.5141°N 3.6641°W, SN871919		Prehistoric	MG282
	Cefn Llydan Circle	Stone circle	Tregynon	52.5644°N 3.3923°W, SO057972		Prehistoric	MG260
	Black Bank Camp	Enclosure	Trewern	52.6611°N 3.0901°W, SJ263075		Prehistoric	MG141
	Knaps Barrows	Round barrow	Trewern	52.6769°N 3.0473°W, SJ293093		Prehistoric	MG213
	Coed y Dinas Round Barrow	Round barrow	Welshpool	52.6458°N 3.149°W, SJ223059		Prehistoric	MG281
	Llwynderw Round Barrow	Round barrow	Welshpool	52.625°N 3.1682°W, SJ210036		Prehistoric	MG283
	Mellington Hill Round Barrow	Round barrow	Welshpool	52.4999°N 3.11°W, SO247896		Prehistoric	MG284
	Bryn Du hut circle	Hut circle settlement	Aberhafesp	52.5705°N 3.4484°W, SO019979		Prehistoric	MG325
	Gogerddan Camp	Hillfort	Banwy	52.6967°N 3.4913°W, SH993120		Prehistoric	MG074
	Maes Llymystyn Camp	Enclosure	Banwy	52.691°N 3.5256°W, SH969114		Prehistoric	MG075
	Bausley Hill Camp	Hillfort	Bausley with Criggion	52.7243°N 3.0054°W, SJ321145		Prehistoric	MG060
	Breiddin Hill Camp	Hillfort	Bausley with Criggion	52.7219°N 3.0449°W, SJ295144		Prehistoric	MG021
	Blackwood Enclosure	Enclosure	Berriew	52.5816°N 3.2403°W, SO160989		Prehistoric	MG239
	Camp 230m SE of Waen Heilyn (revealed by aerial photography)	Enclosure	Berriew	52.5713°N 3.2269°W, SO169977		Prehistoric	MG173
	Lower House Camp	Enclosure	Berriew	52.623°N 3.2276°W, SJ169035		Prehistoric	MG154
	Pen-y-Gaer Camp	Hillfort	Bettws	52.5697°N 3.2707°W, SO139976		Prehistoric	MG155
	Ucheldre Camp	Enclosure	Bettws	52.5785°N 3.2695°W, SO140986		Prehistoric	MG156
	Hut Circle Settlement below Foel Isaf, Bugeilyn	Hut circle settlement	Cadfarch	52.5052°N 3.757°W, SN808911		Prehistoric	MG255
	Gwyn Fynydd Camp	Enclosure	Caersws	52.5321°N 3.4185°W, SO038936		Prehistoric	MG064
	Round Hut 400m NE of Garreg Hir	Hut circle settlement	Caersws	52.5691°N 3.4803°W, SN997978		Prehistoric	MG339
	Round Hut 700m NNE of Garreg Hir	Hut circle settlement	Caersws	52.5722°N 3.4813°W, SN997981		Prehistoric	MG338
	Wyle Cop Camp	Enclosure	Caersws	52.54°N 3.4413°W, SO023945		Prehistoric	MG123
	Castell Carno	Hillfort	Carno	52.5526°N 3.5515°W, SN949961		Prehistoric	MG205
View south-west from Llanymynech Hill	Llanymynech Hill Camp	Hillfort	Carreghofa	52.7912°N 3.0908°W, SJ265220		Prehistoric	MG030
	Camp 270m SSW of Ty Mawr	Enclosure	Castle Caereinion	52.6279°N 3.2254°W, SJ171040		Prehistoric	MG165
	Pen y Coed Hillfort, Cyfronydd	Hillfort	Castle Caereinion	52.6538°N 3.274°W, SJ139069		Prehistoric	MG233
	Pen y Foel Camp	Hillfort	Castle Caereinion	52.6448°N 3.2155°W, SJ178059		Prehistoric	MG010
	Tan y Clawdd Camp	Hillfort	Castle Caereinion	52.6626°N 3.2002°W, SJ189078		Prehistoric	MG131
	Y Golfa Camp	Enclosure	Castle Caereinion	52.6534°N 3.2163°W, SJ178068		Prehistoric	MG132
	Caer-Din	Enclosure	Churchstoke	52.5009°N 3.072°W, SO273897		Prehistoric	MG091
	Pentre Camp	Hillfort	Churchstoke	52.5162°N 3.0604°W, SO281914		Prehistoric	MG129
Roundton Hill	Roundton Hillfort	Hillfort	Churchstoke	52.5481°N 3.0427°W, SO293949		Prehistoric	MG337
	Site S of Bagbury (revealed by aerial photography)	Enclosure	Churchstoke	52.5297°N 3.006°W, SO318929		Prehistoric	MG202
Beacon Ring Fort	Beacon Ring Camp (Caer Digoll)	Hillfort	Forden with Leighton and Trelystan	52.6449°N 3.0878°W, SJ264057		Prehistoric	MG011
	Fron Goch Hillfort	Hillfort	Glantwymyn	52.5973°N 3.7403°W, SH822013		Prehistoric	MG332
	Camp 350m NW of Varchoel Hall (revealed by aerial photography)	Enclosure	Guilsfield	52.7054°N 3.1258°W, SJ240125		Prehistoric	MG178
	Cefn-Du Camp	Hillfort	Guilsfield	52.6757°N 3.258°W, SJ150094		Prehistoric	MG008
Hill fort ramparts at Gaer Fawr	Gaer Fawr	Hillfort	Guilsfield	52.7093°N 3.15°W, SJ224130		Prehistoric	MG006
	Camp Pen-y-Gelli (revealed by aerial photography)	Enclosure	Kerry	52.5112°N 3.2152°W, SO176910		Prehistoric	MG177
	Fron Derw Wood Camp	Hillfort	Kerry	52.4919°N 3.2215°W, SO171889		Prehistoric	MG135
	Great Cloddiau Camp	Enclosure	Kerry	52.5097°N 3.2409°W, SO158909		Prehistoric	MG169
	Hill Tenement Enclosure	Enclosure	Kerry	52.4884°N 3.2077°W, SO180885		Prehistoric	MG240
	Sibwll Wood Camp	Enclosure	Kerry	52.4976°N 3.2091°W, SO180895		Prehistoric	MG136
	Cefn Carnedd Camp	Hillfort	Llandinam	52.499°N 3.4503°W, SO016899		Prehistoric	MG016
	Waun Lluest Owain Round Hut and Long Hut	Unenclosed hut circle	Llandinam	52.4471°N 3.4185°W, SO036841		Prehistoric	MG253
	Bryn Mawr Camp	Hillfort	Llandysilio	52.764°N 3.1113°W, SJ251190		Prehistoric	MG158
	Cefn Llan Hillfort	Hillfort	Llandyssil	52.545°N 3.1726°W, SO205947		Prehistoric	MG236
	Giant's Bank Camp	Hillfort	Llandyssil	52.5219°N 3.2514°W, SO151922		Prehistoric	MG112
	Mount Pleasant Enclosure	Enclosure	Llandyssil	52.5349°N 3.1957°W, SO189936		Prehistoric	MG237
	Gardden Camp & Barrows	Hillfort	Llanerfyl	52.6666°N 3.4305°W, SJ033086		Prehistoric	MG070
	Moel Ddolwen Camp	Hillfort	Llanerfyl	52.6589°N 3.4962°W, SH989078		Prehistoric	MG149
	Site 300m SW of Tan-llan (revealed by aerial photography)	Hillfort	Llanfair Caereinion	52.6551°N 3.3231°W, SJ106072		Prehistoric	MG203
	Allt Dolanog Hillfort	Hillfort	Llanfihangel-yng-Ngwynfa	52.7096°N 3.3865°W, SJ064133		Prehistoric	MG229
	Pen y Gorddyn Hillfort	Hillfort	Llanfihangel-yng-Ngwynfa	52.7159°N 3.361°W, SJ081140		Prehistoric	MG238
	Pen-llys Hillfort	Hillfort	Llanfihangel-yng-Ngwynfa	52.7255°N 3.3263°W, SJ105150		Prehistoric	MG230
	Derwlwyn Coppice Hillfort	Hillfort	Llanfyllin	52.7728°N 3.2607°W, SJ150202		Prehistoric	MG228
Llwyn Bryn-dinas from the north	Llwyn Bryn-Dinas Camp	Hillfort	Llangedwyn	52.8135°N 3.2294°W, SJ172247	formerly in historic Denbighshire	Prehistoric	DE121
	Plas Uchaf Enclosure	Enclosure	Llangedwyn	52.8115°N 3.2196°W, SJ178244	formerly in historic Denbighshire	Prehistoric	DE227
	Bryn y Saethau Hillfort	Hillfort	Llangyniew	52.6883°N 3.2998°W, SJ122108		Prehistoric	MG231
	Ffridd Mathrafal Hillfort	Hillfort	Llangyniew	52.6934°N 3.305°W, SJ119114		Prehistoric	MG232
	Pentre Camp	Hillfort	Llangyniew	52.6766°N 3.3068°W, SJ117095		Prehistoric	MG124
Craig Rhiwarth	Craig Rhiwarth Ancient Village	Hillfort	Llangynog	52.8323°N 3.4018°W, SJ056270		Prehistoric	MG004
	Pen y Castell	Hillfort	Llanidloes Without	52.4805°N 3.5537°W, SN945880		Prehistoric	MG082
	Pen y Clun Camp	Hillfort	Llanidloes Without	52.4746°N 3.5828°W, SN925874		Prehistoric	MG031
	Pen-y-Gaer Camp	Hillfort	Llanidloes Without	52.469°N 3.6084°W, SN908868		Prehistoric	MG085
	Llanrhaeadr-ym-Mochnant Crop Marks W of Meusydd Smithy	Enclosure	Llanrhaeadr-ym-Mochnant	52.8176°N 3.2868°W, SJ133252	formerly in historic Denbighshire	Prehistoric	DE220
	Collfryn Enclosure & Field System	Enclosure	Llansantffraid	52.748°N 3.1548°W, SJ221173		Prehistoric	MG200
	Soldier's Mount	Hillfort	Llansantffraid	52.7773°N 3.1662°W, SJ214206		Prehistoric	MG116
	Broniarth Hill Camp	Enclosure	Meifod	52.6974°N 3.2426°W, SJ161118		Prehistoric	MG097
	Bryngwyn Wood Camp	Hillfort	Meifod	52.7518°N 3.2109°W, SJ183178		Prehistoric	MG029
	Bwlch-y-Cibau Enclosure	Enclosure	Meifod	52.7477°N 3.2215°W, SJ176173		Prehistoric	MG210
	Camp 135m SE of Pant Mawr	Enclosure	Meifod	52.6957°N 3.2279°W, SJ171116		Prehistoric	MG096
	Clawdd Wood Camp	Enclosure	Meifod	52.6891°N 3.2429°W, SJ160108		Prehistoric	MG099
Ffridd Faldwyn	Ffridd Faldwyn Camp	Hillfort	Montgomery	52.5642°N 3.1572°W, SO216968		Prehistoric	MG015
	Bryn Bank Hillfort	Hillfort	Newtown and Llanllwchaiarn	52.5244°N 3.3129°W, SO110926		Prehistoric	MG211
	Dinas Camp	Hillfort	Trefeglwys	52.4877°N 3.6137°W, SN905889		Prehistoric	MG020
	Dolgwden Enclosure	Hillfort	Trefeglwys	52.4907°N 3.5396°W, SN955892		Prehistoric	MG235
	Cefn y Castell	Hillfort	Trewern	52.7134°N 3.0294°W, SJ305133		Prehistoric	MG007
	Crowther's Coppice Camp	Enclosure	Welshpool	52.6939°N 3.1147°W, SJ247112		Prehistoric	MG143

== See also ==
- List of Cadw properties
- List of castles in Wales
- List of hill forts in Wales
- Historic houses in Wales
- List of monastic houses in Wales
- List of museums in Wales
- List of Roman villas in Wales
