= List of communities in Wales =

This is a list of communities in Wales sorted by principal area. The 'community' is the lowest tier of local government in Wales, and is usually represented by a community council. A Welsh community is broadly equivalent to an English civil parish. In total, Wales is divided into 878 communities, of which about 768 (87%) are represented by community councils.

== Blaenau Gwent ==
- Abertillery (Note: Overseen by Abertillery & Llanhilleth Community Council) (Note: Formerly Abertillery Urban District)
- Brynmawr (town) (Note: Formerly Brynmawr Urban District)
- Llanhilleth
- Nantyglo and Blaina (town) (Note: Formerly Nantyglo and Blaina Urban District)
- Tredegar (town) (Note: Formerly Tredegar Urban District)

=== Communities without councils ===
- Badminton (Note: Formerly Ebbw Vale Urban District)
- Beaufort
- Cwm
- Ebbw Vale North
- Ebbw Vale South
- Garnlydan
- Rassau

=== Former communities ===
- Ebbw Vale

== Bridgend ==
- Brackla (Note: Formerly Bridgend Urban District)
- Bridgend (town)
- Cefn Cribwr (Note: Formerly Pen-y-bont Rural District)
- Coity Higher
- Cornelly
- Coychurch Higher
- Coychurch Lower
- Garw Valley (Note: Formerly Ogmore and Garw Urban District)
- Laleston
- Llangynwyd Lower
- Llangynwyd Middle
- Maesteg (town) (Note: Formerly Maesteg Urban District)
- Merthyr Mawr
- Newcastle Higher
- Ogmore Valley
- Pencoed (town)
- Porthcawl (town) (Note: Formerly Porthcawl Urban District)
- Pyle
- St Bride's Minor
- Ynysawdre

== Caerphilly ==
- Aber Valley (Note: Formerly Caerphilly Urban District)
- Argoed (Note: Formerly Bedwellty Urban District)
- Bargoed (town) (Note: Formerly Gelligaer Urban District)
- Bedwas, Trethomas and Machen (Note: Formerly Bedwas and Machen Urban District)
- Blackwood (town)
- Caerphilly (town)
- Darran Valley
- Draethen, Waterloo and Rudry (Note: Formerly Cardiff Rural District)
- Gelligaer
- Llanbradach and Pwllypant
- Maesycwmmer
- Nelson
- New Tredegar
- Penyrheol, Trecenydd and Energlyn
- Rhymney (Note: Formerly Rhymney Urban District)
- Risca East (Note: Formerly Risca Urban District)
- Risca Town (town)
- Van

=== Communities without councils ===
- Abercarn (Note: Formerly Abercarn Urban District)
- Cefn Fforest
- Crosskeys
- Crumlin
- Newbridge
- Pengam
- Penmaen (Note: Formerly Mynyddislwyn Urban District)
- Pontllanfraith
- Ynysddu

== Cardiff ==
- Lisvane
- Old St Mellons (Note: Formerly Magor and St Mellons Rural District)
- Pentyrch
- Radyr and Morganstown
- St Fagans
- Tongwynlais

=== Communities without councils ===
- Adamsdown (Note: Formerly Cardiff County Borough)
- Butetown
- Caerau
- Canton
- Castle
- Cathays
- Cyncoed
- Ely
- Fairwater
- Gabalfa
- Grangetown
- Heath
- Llandaff
- Llandaff North
- Llanedeyrn (created in 2016)
- Llanishen
- Llanrumney
- Pentwyn
- Penylan
- Pontcanna (created in 2016)
- Pontprennau
- Rhiwbina
- Riverside
- Roath (formerly known as Plasnewydd)
- Rumney
- Splott (Tremorfa removed in 2016)
- Thornhill (created in 2016)
- Tremorfa (created in 2016)
- Trowbridge
- Whitchurch

== Carmarthenshire ==
- Abergwili (Note: Formerly Carmarthen Rural District)
- Abernant
- Ammanford (town) (Note: Formerly Ammanford Urban District)
- Betws (Note: Formerly Llandeilo Rural District)
- Bronwydd
- Carmarthen (town) (Note: Formerly Carmarthen Municipal Borough)
- Cenarth (Note: Formerly Newcastle Emlyn Rural District)
- Cilycwm
- Cilymaenllwyd
- Cwmamman (town) (Note: Formerly Cwmamman Urban District)
- Cynwyl Elfed
- Cynwyl Gaeo
- Dyffryn Cennen
- Eglwyscummin
- Gorslas
- Henllanfallteg (Note: Formerly Narberth Rural District)
- Kidwelly (town) (Note: Formerly Kidwelly Municipal Borough) – see Kidwelly Town Council
- Laugharne Township
- Llanarthney
- Llanboidy
- Llanddarog
- Llanddeusant
- Llanddowror and Llanmiloe
- Llandeilo (town) (Note: Formerly Llandeilo Urban District)
- Llandovery (town) (Note: Formerly Llandovery Municipal Borough)
- Llandybie
- Llandyfaelog
- Llanedi (Note: Formerly Llanelli Rural District)
- Llanegwad
- Llanelli (town) (Note: Formerly Llanelli Municipal Borough) – see Llanelli Town Council
- Llanelli Rural
- Llanfair-ar-y-bryn
- Llanfihangel Aberbythych
- Llanfihangel-ar-Arth
- Llanfihangel Rhos-y-Corn
- Llanfynydd
- Llangadog
- Llangain
- Llangathen
- Llangeler
- Llangennech
- Llangunnor
- Llangyndeyrn
- Llangynin
- Llangynog
- Llanllawddog
- Llanllwni
- Llannon
- Llanpumsaint
- Llansadwrn
- Llansawel
- Llansteffan and Llanybri
- Llanwinio
- Llanwrda
- Llanybydder
- Llanycrwys
- Manordeilo and Salem
- Meidrim
- Myddfai
- Newcastle Emlyn (town) (Note: Formerly Newcastle Emlyn Urban District)
- Newchurch and Merthyr
- Pembrey and Burry Port Town (town) (Note: Formerly Burry Port Urban District)
- Pencarreg
- Pendine
- Pontyberem
- Quarter Bach
- St Clears (town)
- St Ishmael
- Talley
- Trelech
- Trimsaran
- Whitland (town)

== Ceredigion ==
- Aberaeron (town) (Note: Formerly Aberaeron Urban District)
- Aberporth (Note: Formerly Teifiside Rural District)
- Aberystwyth (town) (Note: Formerly Aberystwyth Municipal Borough) – see also Aberystwyth Town Council
- Beulah
- Blaenrheidol (Note: Formerly Aberystwyth Rural District)
- Borth
- Cardigan (town) (Note: Formerly Cardigan Municipal Borough)
- Ceulanamaesmawr
- Ciliau Aeron (Note: Formerly Aberaeron Rural District)
- Dyffryn Arth
- Faenor
- Geneu'r Glyn
- Henfynyw
- Lampeter (town) (Note: Formerly Lampeter Municipal Borough)
- Llanarth
- Llanbadarn Fawr
- Llanddewi Brefi (Note: Formerly Tregaron Rural District)
- Llandyfriog
- Llandysiliogogo
- Llandysul
- Llanfair Clydogau
- Llanfarian
- Llanfihangel Ystrad
- Llangeitho
- Llangoedmor
- Llangrannog
- Llangwyryfon
- Llangybi
- Llangynfelyn
- Llanilar
- Llanllwchaiarn
- Llanrhystyd
- Llansantffraed
- Llanwenog
- Llanwnnen
- Lledrod
- Melindwr
- Nantcwnlle
- New Quay (town) (Note: Formerly New Quay Urban District)
- Penbryn
- Pontarfynach
- Tirymynach
- Trawsgoed
- Trefeurig
- Tregaron
- Troedyraur
- Y Ferwig
- Ysbyty Ystwyth
- Ysgubor-y-coed
- Ystrad Fflur
- Ystradmeurig

== Conwy ==
- Abergele (town) (Note: Formerly Abergele Urban District)
- Betws-y-Coed (Note: Formerly Betws y Coed Urban District)
- Betws yn Rhos (Note: Formerly Aled Rural District)
- Bro Garmon (Note: Formerly Hiraethog Rural District)
- Bro Machno (Note: Formerly Nant Conwy Rural District)
- Caerhun
- Capel Curig
- Cerrigydrudion
- Colwyn Bay (town) (Note: Overseen by Bay of Colwyn Town Council) (Note: Formerly Colwyn Bay Municipal Borough)
- Conwy (town) (Note: Formerly Conwy Municipal Borough) — see by Conwy Town Council
- Dolgarrog
- Dolwyddelan
- Eglwysbach
- Henryd
- Kinmel Bay and Towyn (town)
- Llanddoged and Maenan
- Llanddulas and Rhyd-y-foel
- Llandudno (town) (Note: Formerly Llandudno Urban District)
- Llanfair Talhaiarn
- Llanfairfechan (town) (Note: Formerly Llanfairfechan Urban District)
- Llanfihangel Glyn Myfyr
- Llangernyw
- Llangwm
- Llannefydd
- Llanrwst (town) (Note: Formerly Llanrwst Urban District)
- Llansanffraid Glan Conwy
- Llansannan
- Llysfaen
- Mochdre
- Old Colwyn
- Penmaenmawr (town) (Note: Formerly Penmaenmawr Urban District)
- Pentrefoelas
- Rhos-on-Sea
- Trefriw
- Ysbyty Ifan

== Denbighshire ==
- Aberwheeler (Note: Formerly Ruthin Rural District)
- Betws Gwerfil Goch (Note: Formerly Edeirnion Rural District)
- Bodelwyddan (Note: Formerly St Asaph Rural District)
- Bodfari
- Bryneglwys
- Cefn Meiriadog
- Clocaenog
- Corwen
- Cwm (Note: Overseen by Tremeirchion, Cwm and Waen Community Council)
- Cyffylliog
- Cynwyd
- Denbigh (town) (Note: Formerly Denbigh Municipal Borough)
- Derwen
- Dyserth
- Efenechtyd
- Gwyddelwern
- Henllan
- Llanarmon-yn-Iâl
- Llanbedr Dyffryn Clwyd
- Llandegla
- Llandrillo
- Llandyrnog
- Llanelidan
- Llanfair Dyffryn Clwyd
- Llanferres
- Llangollen (town) (Note: Formerly Llangollen Urban District)
- Llangynhafal
- Llanrhaeadr-yng-Nghinmeirch
- Llantysilio (Note: Formerly Wrexham Rural District)
- Llanynys
- Nantglyn
- Prestatyn (town) (Note: Formerly Prestatyn Urban District)
- Rhuddlan (town)
- Rhyl (town) (Note: Formerly Rhyl Urban District)
- Ruthin (town) (Note: Formerly Ruthin Municipal Borough)
- St Asaph (city)
- Trefnant
- Tremeirchion
- Waen

== Flintshire ==
- Argoed (Note: Formerly Holywell Rural District)
- Bagillt (Note: Formerly Flint Municipal Borough)
- Broughton and Bretton (Note: Formerly Hawarden Rural District)
- Brynford
- Buckley (town) (Note: Formerly Buckley Urban District)
- Caerwys (town)
- Cilcain
- Connah's Quay (town) (Note: Formerly Connah's Quay Urban District)
- Flint (town)
- Gwernaffield with Pantymwyn
- Gwernymynydd
- Halkyn
- Hawarden
- Higher Kinnerton
- Holywell (town) (Note: Formerly Holywell Urban District)
- Hope
- Leeswood and Pontblyddyn
- Llanasa
- Llanfynydd
- Mold (town) (Note: Formerly Mold Urban District)
- Mostyn
- Nannerch
- Nercwys
- Northop
- Northop Hall
- Penyffordd
- Queensferry
- Saltney (town)
- Sealand (town)
- Shotton (town)
- Trelawnyd and Gwaenysgor
- Treuddyn
- Whitford
- Ysceifiog

== Gwynedd ==
- Aberdaron (Note: Formerly Llŷn Rural District)
- Aberdovey (Note: Formerly Tywyn Urban District)
- Abergwyngregyn (Note: Formerly Ogwen Rural District)
- Arthog (Note: Formerly Dolgellau Rural District)
- Bala (town) (Note: Formerly Bala Urban District)
- Bangor (city) (Note: Formerly Bangor Municipal Borough) – see Bangor City Council
- Barmouth (town) (Note: Formerly Barmouth Urban District)
- Beddgelert (Note: Formerly Gwyrfai Rural District)
- Bethesda (Note: Formerly Bethesda Urban District)
- Betws Garmon
- Bontnewydd
- Botwnnog
- Brithdir and Llanfachreth
- Bryn-crug
- Buan
- Caernarfon (royal town) (Note: Formerly Caernarfon Municipal Borough)
- Clynnog
- Corris
- Criccieth (town) (Note: Formerly Criccieth Urban District)
- Dolbenmaen
- Dolgellau (town) (Note: Formerly Dolgellau Urban District)
- Dyffryn Ardudwy
- Ffestiniog (town) (Note: Formerly Ffestiniog Urban District)
- Ganllwyd
- Harlech (town) (Note: Formerly Deudraeth Rural District)
- Llanbedr
- Llanbedrog
- Llanberis
- Llanddeiniolen
- Llandderfel (Note: Formerly Penllyn Rural District)
- Llandwrog
- Llandygai
- Llanegryn
- Llanelltyd
- Llanengan
- Llanfair
- Llanfihangel-y-Pennant
- Llanfrothen
- Llangelynnin
- Llangywer
- Llanllechid
- Llanllyfni
- Llannor
- Llanrug
- Llanuwchllyn
- Llanwnda
- Llanycil
- Llanystumdwy
- Maentwrog
- Mawddwy
- Nefyn (town)
- Pennal
- Penrhyndeudraeth (town)
- Pentir
- Pistyll
- Porthmadog (town) (Note: Formerly Porthmadog Urban District)
- Pwllheli (town) (Note: Formerly Pwllheli Municipal Borough)
- Talsarnau
- Trawsfynydd
- Trefor a Llanaelhaearn
- Tudweiliog
- Tywyn (town)
- Waunfawr
- Y Felinheli

== Isle of Anglesey ==
- Aberffraw (Note: Formerly Valley Rural District)
- Amlwch (town) (Note: Formerly Amlwch Urban District)
- Beaumaris (town) (Note: Formerly Beaumaris Municipal Borough)
- Bodedern
- Bodffordd
- Bodorgan (Note: Formerly Aethwy Rural District)
- Bryngwran
- Cwm Cadnant
- Cylch-y-Garn (Note: Formerly Twrcelyn Rural District)
- Holyhead (town) (Note: Formerly Holyhead Urban District) – see Holyhead Town Council
- Llanbadrig
- Llanddaniel Fab
- Llanddona
- Llanddyfnan
- Llaneilian
- Llaneugrad
- Llanfachraeth
- Llanfaelog
- Llanfaethlu
- Llanfair-Mathafarn-Eithaf
- Llanfair Pwllgwyngyll
- Llanfair-yn-neubwll
- Llanfihangel Ysgeifiog
- Llangefni (town) (Note: Formerly Llangefni Urban District)
- Llangoed
- Llangristiolus
- Llanidan
- Llannerch-y-medd
- Mechell
- Menai Bridge (town) (Note: Formerly Menai Bridge Urban District)
- Moelfre
- Penmynydd
- Pentraeth
- Rhoscolyn
- Rhosybol
- Rhosyr
- Trearddur
- Tref Alaw
- Trewalchmai
- Valley

== Merthyr Tydfil ==
- Bedlinog

=== Communities without councils ===
- Cyfarthfa (Note: Formerly Merthyr Tydfil County Borough)
- Dowlais
- Gurnos
- Merthyr Vale
- Pant
- Park
- Penydarren
- Town (Town)
- Treharris
- Troed-y-rhiw
- Vaynor (Note: Formerly Vaynor and Penderyn Rural District)

== Monmouthshire ==
- Abergavenny (town) (Note: Formerly Abergavenny Municipal Borough)
- Caerwent (Note: Formerly Chepstow Rural District)
- Caldicot (town)
- Chepstow (town) (Note: Formerly Chepstow Urban District)
- Crucorney (Note: Formerly Abergavenny Rural District)
- Devauden
- Gobion Fawr
- Goetre Fawr (Note: Formerly Pontypool Rural District)
- Grosmont
- Llanarth
- Llanbadoc
- Llanelly (Note: Formerly Crickhowell Rural District)
- Llanfoist Fawr
- Llangybi
- Llantilio Pertholey
- Llantrisant Fawr
- Magor with Undy
- Mathern
- Mitchel Troy (Note: Formerly Monmouth Rural District)
- Monmouth (town) (Note: Formerly Monmouth Municipal Borough) – see also Monmouth Town Council
- Portskewett
- Raglan
- Rogiet
- Shirenewton
- Skenfrith
- St Arvans
- Trellech United
- Usk (town) (Note: Formerly Usk Urban District)
- Whitecastle
- Wye Valley

=== Former communities ===
- Gwehelog Fawr (until 2022)
- Llangattock-Vibon-Avel
- Llangwm (until 2022)
- Llanhennock (until 2022)
- Llantilio Crossenny

== Neath Port Talbot ==
- Blaengwrach (Note: Formerly Neath Rural District)
- Blaenhonddan
- Briton Ferry (town) (Note: Formerly Neath Municipal Borough)
- Cilybebyll (Note: Formerly Pontardawe Rural District)
- Clyne and Melincourt
- Coedffranc
- Crynant
- Cwmllynfell
- Dyffryn Clydach
- Glynneath (town)
- Gwaun-Cae-Gurwen
- Neath (town)
- Onllwyn
- Pelenna
- Pontardawe (town)
- Resolven
- Seven Sisters
- Tonna
- Ystalyfera

=== Communities without councils ===
- Aberavon (Note: Formerly Port Talbot Municipal Borough)
- Baglan
- Baglan Bay
- Baglan Moors
- Bryn
- Cwmafan
- Cymer and Glyncorrwg (Note: Formerly Glyncorrwg Urban District)
- Gwynfi and Croeserw
- Margam
- Margam Moors
- Port Talbot
- Sandfields East
- Sandfields West
- Tai-Bach

=== Former communities ===
- Glyncorrwg

== Newport ==
- Bishton
- Coedkernew (Note: Formerly Newport County Borough)
- Goldcliff
- Graig
- Langstone
- Llanvaches
- Llanwern
- Marshfield
- Michaelston-y-Fedw
- Nash
- Penhow
- Redwick
- Rogerstone
- Wentlooge

=== Communities without councils ===
- Allt-yr-yn
- Alway
- Beechwood
- Bettws
- Caerleon (Note: Formerly Caerleon Urban District)
- Gaer
- Lliswerry
- Malpas
- Pillgwenlly
- Ringland
- Shaftesbury
- St Julians
- Stow Hill
- Tredegar Park
- Victoria

== Pembrokeshire ==
- Ambleston (Note: Formerly Haverfordwest Rural District)
- Amroth
- Angle (Note: Formerly Pembroke Rural District)
- Boncath (Note: Formerly Cemaes Rural District)
- Brawdy
- Burton
- Camrose
- Carew
- Cilgerran
- Clunderwen
- Clydau
- Cosheston
- Crymych
- Cwm Gwaun
- Dale
- Dinas Cross
- East Williamston
- Eglwyswrw
- Fishguard and Goodwick (town) (Note: Formerly Fishguard and Goodwick Urban District)
- Freystrop
- Haverfordwest (town) (Note: Formerly Haverfordwest Municipal Borough)
- Hayscastle
- Herbrandston
- Hook
- Hundleton
- Jeffreyston
- Johnston
- Kilgetty/Begelly
- Lampeter Velfrey
- Lamphey
- Letterston
- Llanddewi Velfrey
- Llandissilio West
- Llangwm
- Llanrhian
- Llanstadwell
- Llawhaden
- Maenclochog
- Manorbier
- Manordeifi
- Marloes and St Brides
- Martletwy
- Mathry
- Merlin's Bridge
- Milford Haven (town) (Note: Formerly Milford Haven Urban District)
- Mynachlogddu
- Narberth (town) (Note: Formerly Narberth Urban District)
- Nevern
- New Moat
- Newport (town)
- Neyland (town) (Note: Formerly Neyland Urban District)
- Nolton and Roch
- Pembroke (town) (Note: Formerly Pembroke Municipal Borough)
- Pembroke Dock (town)
- Penally
- Pencaer
- Puncheston
- Rosemarket
- Rudbaxton
- Saundersfoot
- Scleddau
- Solva
- Spittal
- St David's and the Cathedral Close (city)
- St Dogmaels
- St Florence
- St Ishmaels
- St Mary Out Liberty
- Stackpole and Castlemartin (from 3 May 2012)
- Templeton
- Tenby (town) (Note: Formerly Tenby Municipal Borough)
- The Havens
- Tiers Cross
- Uzmaston, Boulston and Slebech (from 3 May 2012)
- Walwyn's Castle
- Wiston
- Wolfscastle

=== Former communities ===
- Castlemartin (until 2 May 2012)
- Slebech (until 2 May 2012)
- Stackpole (until 2 May 2012)
- Trecwn (until 2 May 2012)
- Uzmaston and Boulston (until 2 May 2012)

== Powys ==
- Abbey Cwmhir
- Aberedw (Note: Formerly Colwyn Rural District)
- Aberhafesp (Note: Formerly Newtown and Llanidloes Rural District)
- Abermule with Llandyssil (Note: Formerly Forden Rural District)
- Banwy (Note: Formerly Llanfyllin Rural District)
- Bausley with Criggion
- Beguildy (Note: Formerly Knighton Rural District)
- Berriew
- Betws Cedewain
- Brecon (town) (Note: Formerly Brecon Municipal Borough)
- Bronllys (Note: Formerly Hay Rural District)
- Builth Wells (town) (Note: Formerly Builth Wells Urban District)
- Cadfarch (Note: Formerly Machynlleth Rural District)
- Caersws
- Carno
- Carreghofa
- Castle Caereinion (Note: Formerly Welshpool Municipal Borough)
- Churchstoke
- Cilmery (Note: Formerly Builth Rural District)
- Clyro (Note: Formerly Painscastle Rural District)
- Crai (Note: Formerly Brecknock Rural District)
- Crickhowell (town)
- Cwmdu and District
- Disserth and Trecoed
- Duhonw
- Dwyriw
- Erwood
- Felinfach
- Forden with Leighton and Trelystan
- Gladestry (Note: Formerly New Radnor Rural District)
- Glantwymyn
- Glasbury
- Glascwm
- Glyn Tarell
- Guilsfield
- Gwernyfed
- Hay (town) (Note: Formerly Hay Urban District)
- Honddu Isaf
- Kerry
- Knighton (town) (Note: Formerly Knighton Urban District)
- Llanafan Fawr
- Llanbadarn Fawr (Note: Formerly Llandrindod Wells Urban District) (Note: Formerly Rhayader Rural District)
- Llanbadarn Fynydd
- Llanbister
- Llanbrynmair
- Llanddew
- Llanddewi Ystradenni
- Llandinam
- Llandrindod Wells (town)
- Llandrinio and Arddleen
- Llandysilio
- Llanelwedd
- Llanerfyl
- Llanfair Caereinion
- Llanfechain
- Llanfihangel
- Llanfihangel Rhydithon
- Llanfrynach
- Llanfyllin (town) (Note: Formerly Llanfyllin Municipal Borough)
- Llangammarch
- Llangattock
- Llangedwyn (Note: Formerly Ceiriog Rural District)
- Llangors
- Llangunllo
- Llangurig
- Llangynidr
- Llangyniew
- Llangynog
- Llanidloes (town) (Note: Formerly Llanidloes Municipal Borough)
- Llanidloes Without
- Llanigon
- Llanrhaeadr-ym-Mochnant
- Llansantffraid
- Llansilin
- Llanwddyn
- Llanwrthwl
- Llanwrtyd Wells (town) (Note: Formerly Llanwrtyd Wells Urban District)
- Llanyre
- Llywel
- Machynlleth (town) (Note: Formerly Machynlleth Urban District)
- Maescar
- Manafon
- Meifod
- Merthyr Cynog
- Mochdre with Penstrowed
- Montgomery (town) (Note: Formerly Montgomery Municipal Borough)
- Nantmel
- New Radnor
- Newtown and Llanllwchaiarn (town) (Note: Formerly Newtown and Llanllwchaiarn Urban District)
- Old Radnor
- Painscastle
- Pen-y-Bont-Fawr
- Penybont
- Presteigne (town) (Note: Formerly Presteigne Urban District)
- Rhayader (town)
- St Harmon
- Talgarth
- Talybont-on-Usk
- Tawe Uchaf (Note: Formerly Ystradgynlais Rural District)
- Trallong
- Trefeglwys
- Treflys
- Tregynon
- Trewern
- Vale of Grwyney
- Welshpool (town)
- Whitton
- Yscir
- Ystradfellte
- Ystradgynlais (town)

== Rhondda Cynon Taf ==
- Gilfach Goch (Note: Formerly Llantrisant and Llantwit Fardre Rural District)
- Hirwaun (Note: Formerly Aberdare Urban District)
- Llanharan (Note: Formerly Cowbridge Rural District)
- Llanharry
- Llantrisant
- Llantwit Fardre
- Pont-y-clun
- Pontypridd (town) (Note: Formerly Pontypridd Urban District)
- Rhigos
- Taff's Well
- Tonyrefail
- Ynysybwl and Coed-y-Cwm (Note: Formerly Mountain Ash Urban District)

=== Communities without councils ===
- Aberaman North (from 1 December 2016)
- Aberaman South (from 1 December 2016)
- Abercynon
- Aberdare East (from 1 December 2016)
- Aberdare West (from 1 December 2016)
- Cwm Clydach (Note: Formerly Rhondda Municipal Borough)
- Cwmbach
- Cymmer
- Ferndale
- Llwydcoed
- Llwyn-y-pia
- Maerdy
- Mountain Ash East (from 1 December 2016)
- Mountain Ash West (from 1 December 2016)
- Penrhiw-ceiber
- Pentre
- Pen-y-graig
- Pen-y-waun
- Porth
- Tonypandy
- Trealaw
- Trehafod
- Treherbert
- Treorchy
- Tylorstown
- Ynyshir
- Ystrad

=== Former communities ===
- Aberaman
- Aberdare
- Mountain Ash

== Swansea ==
- Bishopston (Note: Formerly Gower Rural District)
- Clydach
- Gorseinon (town) (Note: Formerly Llwchwr Urban District)
- Gowerton
- Grovesend and Waungron
- Ilston
- Killay (Note: Formerly Swansea County Borough)
- Llangennith, Llanmadoc and Cheriton
- Llangyfelach
- Llanrhidian Higher
- Llanrhidian Lower
- Llwchwr (town)
- Mawr
- Mumbles
- Penllergaer
- Pennard
- Penrice
- Pontarddulais (town)
- Pontlliw and Tircoed
- Port Eynon
- Reynoldston
- Rhossili
- Three Crosses (from 3 May 2012)
- Upper Killay

=== Communities without councils ===
- Birchgrove
- Bonymaen
- Castle
- Cockett
- Cwmbwrla
- Dunvant
- Landore
- Llansamlet
- Morriston
- Mynydd-bach
- Penderry
- Sketty
- St Thomas
- Townhill
- Uplands
- Waterfront
- Waunarlwydd

== Torfaen ==
- Abersychan (Note: overseen by Pontypool Community Council) (Note: Formerly Pontypool Urban District)
- Blaenavon (town) (Note: Formerly Blaenavon Urban District)
- Croesyceiliog (Note: overseen by Croesyceiliog & Llanyrafon Community Council)
- Cwmbran Central (Note: overseen by Cwmbran Community Council) (Note: Formerly Cwmbran Urban District)
- Fairwater
- Henllys
- Llantarnam
- Llanyrafon
- New Inn
- Panteg
- Pen Tranch
- Ponthir
- Pontnewydd
- Pontymoile
- Trevethin
- Upper Cwmbran

== Vale of Glamorgan ==
- Barry (town) (Note: Formerly Barry Municipal Borough) – see also Barry Town Council
- Colwinston
- Cowbridge with Llanblethian (town) (Note: Formerly Cowbridge Municipal Borough)
- Dinas Powys
- Ewenny
- Llancarfan
- Llandough (Note: Formerly Penarth Urban District)
- Llandow
- Llanfair
- Llangan
- Llanmaes
- Llantwit Major (town)
- Michaelston-le-Pit and Leckwith
- Penarth (town) – see Penarth Town Council
- Pendoylan
- Penllyn
- Peterston-super-Ely
- St Athan
- St Bride's Major
- St Donats
- St Georges-super-Ely
- St Nicholas and Bonvilston
- Sully and Lavernock
- Welsh St Donats
- Wenvoe
- Wick

=== Communities without councils ===
- Rhoose

== Wrexham ==
- Abenbury
- Acton (Note: Formerly Wrexham Municipal Borough)
- Bangor is-y-Coed (Note: Formerly Maelor Rural District)
- Bronington
- Broughton
- Brymbo
- Caia Park
- Cefn
- Ceiriog Ucha
- Chirk (town)
- Coedpoeth
- Erbistock
- Esclusham
- Glyntraian
- Gresford
- Gwersyllt
- Hanmer
- Holt
- Isycoed
- Llangollen Rural
- Llansantffraid Glyn Ceiriog
- Llay
- Maelor South
- Marchwiel
- Minera
- Offa
- Overton
- Penycae
- Rhosddu
- Rhosllanerchrugog
- Rossett
- Ruabon
- Sesswick
- Willington Worthenbury

== Communities that reach the highest elevation ==
Rank	Community	Unitary authority	Elevation	Highest point
=1	Beddgelert	Gwynedd	1085 m	Snowdon
=1	Betws Garmon	Gwynedd	1085 m	Snowdon
3	Llanberis	Gwynedd	1065 m	Garnedd Ugain
=4	Llanllechid	Gwynedd	1064 m	Carnedd Llewelyn
=4	Capel Curig	Conwy	1064 m	Carnedd Llewelyn
=4	Caerhun	Conwy	1064 m	Carnedd Llewelyn
7	Llandygai	Gwynedd	1001 m	Glyder Fawr
8	Aber	Gwynedd	942 m	Foel-fras
9	Llanddeiniolen	Gwynedd	924 m	Elidir Fawr
=10	Llanuwchllyn	Gwynedd	905 m	Aran Fawddwy
=10	Brithdir & Llanfachreth	Gwynedd	905 m	Aran Fawddwy
=10	Mawddwy	Gwynedd	905 m	Aran Fawddwy
=13	Arthog	Gwynedd	893 m	Cadair Idris
=13	Llanfihangel-y-Pennant	Gwynedd	893 m	Cadair Idris
=15	Glyn-Tarell	Powys	886 m	Pen y Fan
=15	Llanfrynach	Powys	886 m	Pen y Fan
17	Dolwyddelan	Conwy	872 m	Moel Siabod
18	Dolgellau	Gwynedd	863 m	Mynydd Moel
19	Llanycil	Gwynedd	854 m	Arenig Fawr
20	Llanrhaeadr-ym-Mochnant	Powys	830 m	Cadair Berwyn
21	Llandrillo	Denbighshire	827 m	Cadair Berwyn N Top
=22	Talgarth	Powys	811 m	Waun Fach
=22	The Vale of Grwyney	Powys	811 m	Waun Fach
24	Llywel	Powys	802 m	Fan Brycheiniog
25	Dolgarrog	Conwy	799 m	Pen Llithrig y Wrach
26	Ceiriog Ucha	Wrexham	790 m	Craig Berwyn
27	Dolbenmaen	Gwynedd	782 m	Moel Hebog
28	Llanddeusant	Carmarthenshire	781 m	Fan Foel
=29	Ffestiniog	Gwynedd	770 m	Moelwyn Mawr
=29	Llanfrothen	Gwynedd	770 m	Moelwyn Mawr
31	Talybont-on-Usk	Powys	769 m	Waun Rydd
=32	Llanbedr	Gwynedd	756 m	Y Llethr
=32	Ganllwyd	Gwynedd	756 m	Y Llethr
34	Blaenrheidol	Ceredigion	752 m	Plynlimon
=35	Dyffryn Ardudwy	Gwynedd	750 m	Diffwys
=35	Llanelltyd	Gwynedd	750 m	Diffwys
37	Llanllyfni	Gwynedd	734 m	Craig Cwm Silyn
38	Llangurig	Powys	732 m	Pen Pumlumon Arwystli E slope
39	Waunfawr	Gwynedd	726 m	Moel Eilio
40	Cray	Powys	725 m	Fan Gyhirych
41	Cwmdu and District	Powys	719 m	Pen Allt-mawr
42	Ystradfellte	Powys	715 m	Fan Fawr SW slope
=43	Gwernyfed	Powys	713 m	Rhos Dirion
=43	Llanigon	Powys	713 m	Rhos Dirion
45	Crickhowell	Powys	701 m	Pen Cerrig-calch
46	Llandwrog	Gwynedd	698 m	Mynydd Mawr
47	Llanidloes Without	Powys	684 m	Pen Pumlumon Arwystli NE ridge
48	Crucorney	Monmouthshire	679 m	Chwarel y Fan
49	Trefriw	Conwy	678 m	Creigiau Gleision
50	Corris	Gwynedd	670 m	Waun-oer
=51	Ysbyty Ifan	Conwy	669 m	Carnedd y Filiast
=51	Cerrigydrudion	Conwy	669 m	Carnedd y Filiast
=51	Llandderfel	Conwy	669 m	Carnedd y Filiast
54	Llangywer	Gwynedd	667 m	Foel Cedig
=55	Llangynog	Powys	666 m	Cyrniau Nod
=55	Llanwddyn	Powys	666 m	Cyrniau Nod
57	Llanfairfechan	Conwy	665 m	Carnedd y Ddelw N slope
58	Maescar	Powys	663 m	Fan Nedd
59	New Radnor	Powys	660 m	Great Rhos
60	Bro Machno	Conwy	653 m	Manod Mawr N Top E ridge
61	Llanfihangel Rhydithon	Powys	650 m	Great Rhos N slope
=62	Llanwrthwl	Powys	645 m	Drygarn Fawr
=62	Treflys	Powys	645 m	Drygarn Fawr
64	Llanwrtyd Wells	Powys	639 m	Drygarn Fawr W slope
65	Whitton	Powys	638 m	Black Mixen N slope
66	Bryn-crug	Gwynedd	634 m	Tarrenhendre
67	Penybont	Powys	633 m	Great Rhos W slope
68	Pennal	Gwynedd	631 m	Tarrenhendre SE ridge
69	Corwen	Denbighshire	630 m	Moel Fferna
70	Cynwyd	Denbighshire	625 m	Moel Fferna S slope
71	Talsarnau	Gwynedd	623 m	Moel Ysgyfarnogod
72	Trefeglwys	Powys	622 m	Carnfachbugeilyn
73	Llansantffraid Glyn Ceiriog	Wrexham	621 m	Moel Fferna E slope
74	Trawsfynydd	Gwynedd	619 m	Gallt y Daren
75	Llangynidr	Powys	617 m	Cefn yr Ystrad
=76	Llangadog	Carmarthenshire	616 m	Garreg Lwyd
=76	Quarter Bach	Carmarthenshire	616 m	Garreg Lwyd
78	Llanafanfawr	Powys	613 m	Gorllwyn
79	Llangwm	Conwy	611 m	Foel Goch
80	Pontarfynach	Ceredigion	611 m	Pen y Garn
81	Penmaenmawr	Conwy	610 m	Tal y Fan
82	Old Radnor	Powys	610 m	Bache Hill

== See also ==
- List of civil parishes in England
- List of civil parishes in Scotland
- List of community council areas in Scotland
