= List of Roman-to-modern scheduled monuments in Powys (Montgomeryshire) =

Scheduled Monuments in Powys, Wales.
=Roman =Early Medieval =Medieval
=Post-Medieval/Modern

Powys is the largest administrative county in Wales. With an over a quarter of Wales's land area, covering much of the eastern half of the country, it is a county of remote uplands, low population and no coastline. It was created in more or less its current form in 1974, and is the only one of the large county units created at that time to have been carried forward intact at the 1996 local government re-organisation. It comprises three historic counties, namely Montgomeryshire, Radnorshire, and most of Brecknockshire. There are 950 scheduled monuments within the county, which is far more than can be sensibly covered in one list. Each of the 3 historic counties is therefore listed separately, and each of these has two lists - one for the prehistoric sites and one for the Roman, medieval and post-medieval sites.

This list shows the sites dating to Roman, medieval and post-medieval times in Montgomeryshire, which occupies the northern third of Powys. Of the 303 scheduled monuments in Montgomeryshire, 190 date to prehistoric times. The 113 on this list include 16 Roman sites, most of which related to the military occupation of Wales. The 25 Early Medieval include 16 sections of Offa's Dyke, along with other dykes and an inscribed stone. The 62 medieval sites are overwhelmingly defensive structures, particularly mottes, but also including castles, settlements, town defences and a gallows. The ten post-medieval sites include mines, bridges, agricultural features and a railway.

The lists of Scheduled Monuments in Powys are as follows:-

- List of Scheduled prehistoric Monuments in Powys (Brecknockshire) (254 sites)
- List of Scheduled Roman to modern Monuments in Powys (Brecknockshire) (135 sites)
- List of Scheduled prehistoric Monuments in Powys (Radnorshire) (139 sites)
- List of Scheduled Roman to modern Monuments in Powys (Radnorshire) (119 sites - shown below)
- List of Scheduled prehistoric Monuments in Powys (Montgomeryshire) (190 sites)
- List of Scheduled Roman to modern Monuments in Powys (Montgomeryshire) (113 sites)

Scheduled Ancient Monuments (SAMs) have statutory protection. It is illegal to disturb the ground surface or any standing remains. The compilation of the list is undertaken by Cadw Welsh Historic Monuments, which is an executive agency of the National Assembly of Wales. The list of scheduled monuments below is supplied by Cadw with additional material from RCAHMW and Clwyd-Powys Archaeological Trust.

== Scheduled Roman, medieval and post-medieval monuments in Montgomeryshire ==
The list is sorted by period, and then by Community so that sites of similar age and locality are placed near each other. Clicking on the heading arrows will sort the list by that information.

Image	Name	Site type	Community	Location	Details	Period	SAM No & Refs
	Camp & Fields on New Pieces, Breiddin Hill	Enclosure	Bausley with Criggion	52.7203°N 3.0417°W, SJ297141		Roman	MG081
	Caersws Roman Fort and Vicus: section in SE part of vicus	Vicus	Caersws	52.5162°N 3.4273°W, SO032918		Roman	MG243
	Caersws Roman Fort and Vicus: section in southern part of vicus	Vicus	Caersws	52.5158°N 3.4296°W, SO030918		Roman	MG242
	Caersws Roman Fort: Section of South Western Defences	Fort	Caersws	52.5159°N 3.4316°W, SO029918		Roman	MG222
	Caersws Roman Fort: South-west corner defences	Fort	Caersws	52.5161°N 3.433°W, SO028918		Roman	MG244
	Caersws Roman Road	Road	Caersws	52.5145°N 3.4626°W, SO008917		Roman	MG324
	Caersws Roman Site	Fort	Caersws	52.5181°N 3.432°W, SO029921		Roman	MG001
	Roman Earthwork NE of Caersws (revealed by aerial photography)	earthwork (unclassified)	Caersws	52.5222°N 3.4139°W, SO041925		Roman	MG161
	Forden Gaer Roman Site	Fort	Forden with Leighton and Trelystan	52.5837°N 3.1677°W, SO209990		Roman	MG012
	Pen y Crogben Earthwork	Enclosure	Llanbrynmair	52.5271°N 3.6876°W, SN856934		Roman	MG106
	Llandinam Hall Enclosure	Enclosure	Llandinam	52.4995°N 3.428°W, SO031900		Roman	MG234
	Gaer Roman Site	Fort	Llanfair Caereinion	52.63°N 3.3226°W, SJ105044		Roman	MG009
	Mynydd Waun Fawr Roman Road	Road	Llanfair Caereinion	52.656°N 3.4211°W, SJ039074		Roman	MG320
	Cae Gaer	Marching camp	Llangurig	52.4221°N 3.7313°W, SN823818		Roman	MG057
	Craig-y-Mwyn Lead Mine	Lead mine	Llanrhaeadr-ym-Mochnant	52.845°N 3.374°W, SJ075283		Roman	MG249
	Roman Supply Depot, Llansantffraid ym Mechain	Enclosure	Llansantffraid	52.7777°N 3.1456°W, SJ228206		Roman	MG216
	Site E of Plas-Llwyn (revealed by aerial photography)	Enclosure	Berriew	52.6039°N 3.1824°W, SJ200013		Early Medieval	MG174
	Aber Bechan Dyke	Linear earthwork	Bettws	52.5425°N 3.2837°W, SO130946		Early Medieval	MG061
	Cross-Incised Stone (Now in Carno Church)	Cross-marked stone	Carno	52.5635°N 3.5401°W, SN957973		Early Medieval	MG146
	Offa's Dyke; Brompton Bridge section extending from Brompton Bridge to Mellington Hall Lodge	Linear earthwork	Churchstoke	52.5299°N 3.1048°W, SO251930		Early Medieval	MG150
	Offa's Dyke: Cwm Section	Linear earthwork	Churchstoke	52.5104°N 3.0927°W, SO259908		Early Medieval	MG151
	Offa's Dyke: Mellington Hall Section Extending from Mellington Hall Lodge to Lower Cwm	Linear earthwork	Churchstoke	52.5202°N 3.0969°W, SO256919		Early Medieval	MG039
	Offa's Dyke: Section from Dudston Covert, Lymore to Lack Brook, Churchstoke	Linear earthwork	Churchstoke	52.5526°N 3.1181°W, SO242955		Early Medieval	MG038
	Offa's Dyke: Section from Road Junction near Drewin to County Boundary	Linear earthwork	Churchstoke	52.5032°N 3.0945°W, SO258900		Early Medieval	MG040
	Offa's Dyke: Pentre Section	Linear earthwork	Forden with Leighton and Trelystan	52.6453°N 3.1131°W, SJ247058		Early Medieval	MG153
	Offa's Dyke: Section at Pentre Farm	Linear earthwork	Forden with Leighton and Trelystan	52.6473°N 3.113°W, SJ248061		Early Medieval	MG217
	Offa's Dyke: Section from Cwm By-Road to Hem Road	Linear earthwork	Forden with Leighton and Trelystan	52.5962°N 3.1375°W, SJ230004		Early Medieval	MG037
	Offa's Dyke: Section from North Lodge, Leighton Park to Old Quarry S of Green Wood	Linear earthwork	Forden with Leighton and Trelystan	52.631°N 3.1087°W, SJ250042		Early Medieval	MG035
	Offa's Dyke: Section from point 90m S of Chirbury Road to S Boundary of Nant-Cribau Park	Linear earthwork	Forden with Leighton and Trelystan	52.6055°N 3.1303°W, SJ235014		Early Medieval	MG036
	Offa's Dyke: Section NE of Welshpool-Churchstoke Road	Linear earthwork	Forden with Leighton and Trelystan	52.6126°N 3.1237°W, SJ242022		Early Medieval	MG139
	Offa's Dyke: Section W of Court House Farm	Linear earthwork	Forden with Leighton and Trelystan	52.6172°N 3.1181°W, SJ243027		Early Medieval	MG138
	Crugyn Bank Dyke	Linear earthwork	Kerry	52.461°N 3.3163°W, SO106855		Early Medieval	MG062
	Upper Short Ditch	Linear earthwork	Kerry	52.4763°N 3.1883°W, SO193871		Early Medieval	MG201
	Wantyn Dyke	Linear earthwork	Kerry	52.5142°N 3.1984°W, SO187913		Early Medieval	MG208
	Offa's Dyke: Section extending 3000m SE to Bele Brook, Llandrinio	Linear earthwork	Llandysilio	52.7485°N 3.0777°W, SJ273173		Early Medieval	MG033
	Aber-Naint Dyke	Linear earthwork	Llanfyllin	52.7871°N 3.299°W, SJ124218		Early Medieval	MG024
	Clawdd Llesg	Linear earthwork	Meifod	52.6925°N 3.2482°W, SJ157112		Early Medieval	MG098
	Hen Domen Pre-Conquest Fields	Field system	Montgomery	52.5742°N 3.163°W, SO212980		Early Medieval	MG170
	Offa's Dyke: Section extending 760m N from centre of Goppas Wood to Hope By-Road	Linear earthwork	Trewern	52.6578°N 3.1112°W, SJ249072		Early Medieval	MG034
	Offa's Dyke: Sections extending 675m S from centre of Goppas Wood	Linear earthwork	Trewern	52.6513°N 3.1123°W, SJ248065		Early Medieval	MG152
	Offa's Dyke: South of School House	Linear earthwork	Trewern	52.6674°N 3.1112°W, SJ249083		Early Medieval	MG224
	Tomen y Faerdre	Motte	Llangedwyn	52.8066°N 3.2643°W, SJ148239	formerly in historic Denbighshire	Medieval	DE122
	Tomen Cefn Glaniwrch	Motte	Llanrhaeadr-ym-Mochnant	52.8192°N 3.2646°W, SJ149254	formerly in historic Denbighshire	Medieval	DE123
Motte and Bailey of Sycharth Castle	Sycharth Mound and Bailey Castle	Motte & Bailey	Llansilin	52.8248°N 3.1803°W, SJ205259	Grass covered earthworks of the birthplace and home of Owain Glyndŵr, destroyed by the future Henry V. Now with car park, and on the Glyndŵr Trail. (formerly in historic Denbighshire)	Medieval	DE020
	Mound & Bailey Castle	Motte & Bailey	Berriew	52.6111°N 3.1843°W, SJ199021		Medieval	MG043
	Caer Noddfa	Enclosure	Carno	52.5571°N 3.5318°W, SN962965		Medieval	MG052
	Carreghofa Castle	Ringwork	Carreghofa	52.7921°N 3.1067°W, SJ254221		Medieval	MG214
	Mound in Churchyard	Motte	Castle Caereinion	52.641°N 3.2376°W, SJ163055		Medieval	MG117
	Plas Yr Alarch Moated Site	Moated site	Castle Caereinion	52.6279°N 3.2125°W, SJ180040		Medieval	MG219
	Bishop's Moat Mound & Bailey Castle	Motte & Bailey	Churchstoke	52.4997°N 3.0461°W, SO290896		Medieval	MG092
	Hyssington Mound & Bailey Castle	Motte & Bailey	Churchstoke	52.5441°N 3.0123°W, SO314945		Medieval	MG119
	Simon's Castle	Motte & Bailey	Churchstoke	52.5331°N 3.0541°W, SO285933		Medieval	MG207
	Upper Aldress Moated Site	Moated site	Churchstoke	52.5555°N 3.0556°W, SO285958		Medieval	MG118
	Lower Min-y-Llyn Castle Mound	Motte	Forden with Leighton and Trelystan	52.6007°N 3.1668°W, SJ210009		Medieval	MG130
	Nant-Cribau Castle Mound	Motte	Forden with Leighton and Trelystan	52.6051°N 3.1273°W, SJ237014		Medieval	MG148
	Nant-Cribau Moated House Site	Moated site	Forden with Leighton and Trelystan	52.6045°N 3.1217°W, SJ241013		Medieval	MG102
	Bwlch Aeddan Dyke	Linear earthwork	Guilsfield	52.6868°N 3.2277°W, SJ171106		Medieval	MG100
	Guilsfield Moated Site	Moated site	Guilsfield	52.6942°N 3.1523°W, SJ222113		Medieval	MG305
	Camp S of Old Hall Sarn	Ringwork	Kerry	52.4995°N 3.1701°W, SO206897		Medieval	MG137
	Neuadd Goch Castle Mound	Motte	Kerry	52.4804°N 3.3573°W, SO079878		Medieval	MG115
	The Moat Mound and Bailey Castle	Motte & Bailey	Kerry	52.4966°N 3.2579°W, SO146894		Medieval	MG050
	Tomen Madoc Castle Mound	Motte	Kerry	52.5089°N 3.26°W, SO144908		Medieval	MG080
	Camp SW of Great Cloddiau Farm (revealed by aerial photography)	Enclosure	Kerry	52.5092°N 3.2438°W, SO156908		Unknown	MG168
	Dyke Near Two Tumps	Linear earthwork	Kerry	52.4534°N 3.2986°W, SO118847		Unknown	MG063
	Lower Short Ditch (Northern Part)	Cross Ridge Dyke	Kerry	52.4887°N 3.1452°W, SO223884		Unknown	MG223
	Domen Fawr Castle Mound Tafolwern	Motte	Llanbrynmair	52.6102°N 3.6391°W, SH891026		Medieval	MG065
	Pen y Crogben Round Barrow	Gallows	Llanbrynmair	52.527°N 3.6894°W, SN854934		Medieval	MG105
	Bron-Felin Mound & Bailey Castle	Motte & Bailey	Llandinam	52.5109°N 3.3979°W, SO052912		Medieval	MG051
	The Moat Mound & Bailey Castle	Motte & Bailey	Llandinam	52.5053°N 3.4072°W, SO045905		Medieval	MG017
	Rhysnant Hall Castle Mound	Ringwork	Llandysilio	52.7504°N 3.1038°W, SJ255175		Medieval	MG142
	Bryn-Derwen Mound and Bailey Castle	Motte & Bailey	Llandyssil	52.5483°N 3.2355°W, SO163952		Medieval	MG054
	Cefn Bryntalch Mound & Bailey Castle	Motte & Bailey	Llandyssil	52.5584°N 3.2181°W, SO175963		Medieval	MG014
	Dolforwyn Castle	Castle	Llandyssil	52.5464°N 3.2525°W, SO151950		Medieval	MG114
	Henfron Moated Site	Moated site	Llandyssil	52.5577°N 3.2006°W, SO187962		Medieval	MG220
	Llysun Motte and Bailey	Motte & Bailey	Llanerfyl	52.6797°N 3.434°W, SJ031100		Medieval	MG072
	Domen Castell Mound & Bailey Castle	Motte	Llanfechain	52.7734°N 3.2077°W, SJ186202		Medieval	MG005
	Soldiers' Graves Pillow Mounds	Pillow mound	Llanfihangel	52.7383°N 3.4457°W, SJ024166		Medieval	MG250
	Tomen y Cefnlloer	Motte	Llanfyllin	52.7935°N 3.3083°W, SJ118225		Medieval	MG026
	Tomen yr Allt Castle Mound	Motte	Llanfyllin	52.7806°N 3.2961°W, SJ126211		Medieval	MG027
	Rhyd yr Onen Mound & Bailey Castle	Motte & Bailey	Llangurig	52.4269°N 3.5858°W, SN922821		Medieval	MG084
	Mathrafal Castle	Castle	Llangyniew	52.6878°N 3.2861°W, SJ131107		Medieval	MG044
	Pen y Castell Mound & Bailey Castle	Motte & Bailey	Llanidloes Without	52.4857°N 3.5011°W, SN981885		Medieval	MG083
	Ty'n-y-Celyn Castle Mound	Motte	Llanrhaeadr-ym-Mochnant	52.8264°N 3.3301°W, SJ104262		Medieval	MG028
	Ty-Newydd Dyke	Linear earthwork	Llanrhaeadr-ym-Mochnant	52.7999°N 3.2878°W, SJ132232		Unknown	MG025
	Hen Domen	Motte	Llansantffraid	52.7616°N 3.1269°W, SJ240188		Medieval	MG103
	Plas yn Dinas	Enclosure	Llansantffraid	52.7625°N 3.16°W, SJ218189		Medieval	MG078
	Bryn Gwyn Deserted Rural Settlement	Deserted Rural Settlement	Llanwddyn	52.7866°N 3.4968°W, SH991220		Medieval	MG251
	Llanwddyn Hospitium	Grange	Llanwddyn	52.7628°N 3.4863°W, SH998193		Medieval	MG241
	Bwlch-y-Cibau Dyke	Linear earthwork	Meifod	52.741°N 3.2112°W, SJ183166		Medieval	MG077
	Cwrt y Person Moated Site	Moated site	Meifod	52.7128°N 3.2542°W, SJ153135		Medieval	MG166
	Hen Domen Mound & Bailey Castle	Motte & Bailey	Montgomery	52.5744°N 3.1616°W, SO213980		Medieval	MG013
	Montgomery Castle	Castle	Montgomery	52.5632°N 3.1501°W, SO221967		Medieval	MG022
	Montgomery Medieval Town, Kerry Gate Extra Mural Settlement	Extra-mural settlement	Montgomery	52.5579°N 3.1491°W, SO221961		Medieval	MG225
	Montgomery Medieval Town, Part adjacent to Westmead, School Lane	Town	Montgomery	52.5632°N 3.1461°W, SO224967		Medieval	MG221
	Town Bank & Ditches	Town Wall	Montgomery	52.5602°N 3.1513°W, SO220964		Medieval	MG023
	Gro Tump Mound & Bailey Castle	Motte & Bailey	Newtown and Llanllwchaiarn	52.5208°N 3.2936°W, SO123922		Medieval	MG059
	Newtown Hall Castle Mound	Motte	Newtown and Llanllwchaiarn	52.5133°N 3.3171°W, SO107914		Medieval	MG160
	Newtown Old Church	Church	Newtown and Llanllwchaiarn	52.5169°N 3.3146°W, SO108918		Medieval	MG056
	Clawdd Mawr	Linear earthwork	Pen-y-Bont-Fawr	52.7829°N 3.3898°W, SJ065218		Medieval	MG101
	Tregynon Moated Site	Moated site	Tregynon	52.5754°N 3.3329°W, SO097983		Medieval	MG204
	Domen Castell Mound and Bailey Castle	Motte & Bailey	Welshpool	52.659°N 3.1396°W, SJ230074		Medieval	MG019
	Mount in Powis Castle Park	Motte	Welshpool	52.6489°N 3.1658°W, SJ212063		Medieval	MG093
	Strata Marcella Abbey	Abbey	Welshpool	52.6862°N 3.1086°W, SJ251104		Medieval	MG120
	Llandrinio Bridge	Bridge	Llandrinio	52.7459°N 3.0407°W, SJ298169		Post-Medieval/Modern	MG046
	Root Store at Bon-y-Maen 800m NW of Blaen y Cwm	Root store	Llanerfyl	52.6174°N 3.5101°W, SH978032		Post-Medieval/Modern	MG218
	Nant yr Eira Prehistoric Copper Mines & 19th Century Lead Mine	Industrial monument	Llangurig	52.4713°N 3.7286°W, SN826873		Post-Medieval/Modern	MG226
	Bryntail Lead Mine Buildings	Lead mine	Llanidloes Without	52.4688°N 3.6008°W, SN913868		Post-Medieval/Modern	MG159
	Penyclun Lead Mine	Lead mine	Llanidloes Without	52.4732°N 3.5755°W, SN930873		Post-Medieval/Modern	MG246
	Machynlleth Bridge	Bridge	Machynlleth, (also Pennal), (see also Gwynedd)	52.6005°N 3.8557°W, SH744019		Post-Medieval/Modern	MG002
	Dyngwm/Castle Rock Lead Mine	Lead mine	Trefeglwys	52.5245°N 3.6965°W, SN850932		Post-Medieval/Modern	MG247
	Powis Castle Park Mound	earthwork (unclassified)	Welshpool	52.6437°N 3.1811°W, SJ201057		Post-Medieval/Modern	MG212
	Railway Transfer Dock at Welshpool	Railway	Welshpool	52.6583°N 3.1401°W, SJ229073		Post-Medieval/Modern	MG254
	Bryn Diliw Long Hut	Rectangular hut	Llangurig, (also Pontarfynach), (see also Ceredigion)	52.3838°N 3.7026°W, SN842775		Post-Medieval/Modern	CD191

== See also ==
- List of Cadw properties
- List of castles in Wales
- List of hill forts in Wales
- Historic houses in Wales
- List of monastic houses in Wales
- List of museums in Wales
- List of Roman villas in Wales
