= Townships in Montgomeryshire =

Former county divisions in mid Wales

The County of Montgomery

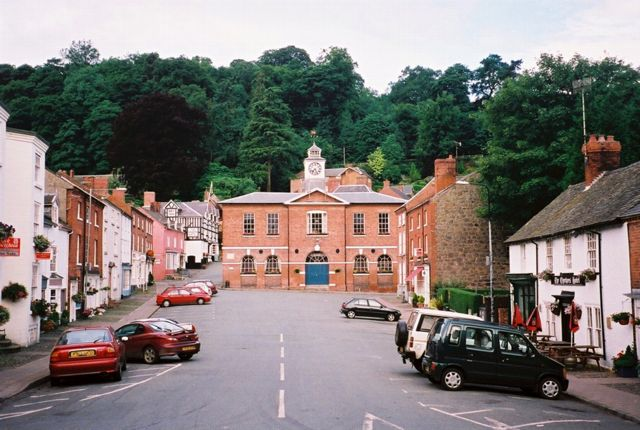
Montgomery Town Hall - A Meeting Place of the Montgomeryshire Court of Great Sessions

The former county of Montgomeryshire was divided into townships, divisions of its ancient parishes. In 1539, townships were grouped together in hundreds. The townships which were recognised were based on the older Welsh divisions of tref, or plural trefi, which had formed the Welsh administrative districts of commotes. Not all of the former tref were recognised and some smaller trefi were amalgamated into larger townships. A township was allocated to a particular parish—that is, one of the [civil] parishes of Wales (analogous to civil parishes of England), the predecessors to today's communities of Wales. The townships were recognised as administrative districts, rather than the parishes.

== Townships in Montgomeryshire ==
The townships have been mapped by Murray Chapman. The Townships were grouped into Hundreds, and this formed the basis for the Montgomeryshire Court of Great Sessions. The Court met for the first time in 1541, and established the civil and criminal administration of the new County of Montgomeryshire and also arranged for the election of the Member of Parliament for Montgomeryshire. A Mr Sulyard was appointed as surveyor to define the new counties and presumably agree the new townships. The number of Trefi were reduced and many were grouped together. An example is the township named Trefor and Ffin in Kerry. In the large township of Rhandir in Llandyssil parish, the trefi of Coed-wig, Trefganol and Cefn-y-coed were all merged. Many names of Trefi were lost, but some are noted in Melville Richards study of administrative units. The exact extent of many townships can be recovered from many of the Enclosure Awards, but for some Montgomeryshire parishes such as Llangynog the information appears to be missing.

Townships have been studied in Wales and the Marches by Dorothy Sylvester. She has shown that in Montgomeryshire and North West Wales Parishes were normally larger in the Medieval period and would contain many townships, while in Southern and Western Wales, parishes would be smaller and often the extent of the Township will coincide with that of the parish. Sylvester notes that in 1811 there were 53 parishes in Montgomeryshire, with an average size of 15.8 square miles, making them larger than most parishes in other Welsh counties. There were about 239 townships, with an average of 4.5 per parish. Some Montgomeryshire township were within ecclesiastical parishes which were outside County. This is particularly the case along the Montgomeryshire Shropshire border and Sylvester’s figures may have to be modified. The pattern of local government for Montgomeryshire based on the Township, Hundred and the Court of Great Sessions survived until 1830, when the Court of Great Sessions was abolished while the Assises and Quarter Sessions remained. The responsibilities of Townships further declined with the establishment of the Poor Law Unions in 1834, which were organised on a parish basis. Townships in Montgomeryshire finally disappeared as a recognised administrative unit with the establishment of the Montgomeryshire County Council in 1886 and the Rural District Councils in 1894.

== Administration of Townships ==
As the pattern of administration evolved in Elizabethan and later times, the Welsh Township was expected to have its own Court House (sometimes called a Plas), and to provide a pinfold, stocks and butts for archery. They were also responsible for Vagabonds and Paupers. Two Parish Constables were appointed each year for the administration of Justice. The maintenance of roads and bridges was also a responsibility of the Township, but this was reduced in 1819, when Thomas Penson was appointed as the first County Surveyor for Montgomeryshire. The Militia in the earlier period would be raised by the Hundred with the townships contributing. The Court House would normally be the main residence in the Township and the occupier of the house was likely to be a Justice of the Peace. With the establishment of the National Census in 1801, the population counts were on a township rather than parish basis.

== Hundreds in Montgomeryshire ==
Montgomeryshire was initially split into 10 Hundreds, but Clun Hundred was removed by an Act of Parliament in 1546 and included in Shropshire. The following Hundreds were established in 1541

- Llanfyllin
- Deuddwr
- Welshpool
- Caus
- Montgomery
- Newtown
- Mathrafal
- Machynlleth

== Literature ==
- Chapman, Murray Ll., (2012), The Creation of the County of Montgomery, Montgomeryshire Collections, Vol. 100, 127-148.
- Chapman, Murray Ll., (1999), The Creation of the County of Montgomery, in The Montgomeryshire Historical Atlas (ed. D. Jenkins),
- Jenkins D., (1999), The Montgomeryshire Historical Atlas, The Powyland Club, Welshpool.
- Glyn Parry, (1995), Guide to the Court of Great Sessions,, National Library of Wales, Aberystwyth.
- Richards M Welsh Administrative and Territorial Units. University of Wales Press, UWP, 1969.
- Sylvester D., (1969), The Rural Landscape of the Welsh Borderland: A Study in Historical Geography, Macmillan, London

== Listing of Montgomeryshire Townships (after 1541) ==
Parishes (in 1800) by Diocese in Montgomeryshire with their respective Townships. 57 Parishes in total-some Montgomeryshire Townships may be part of parishes in other counties such as Shropshire

=== Diocese of Bangor ===
- Llangurig:- Carn-Coed, Cefn yr Hafodau, Glan-y-nant, Glynbrochan, Glyngynwydd, Glynhafren, Uwchcoed, Llanifyny, Llan-iwaered.
- Llanidloes:- Llanidloes
- Trefeglwys:- Bodaeoch, Dolgwden, Esgeiredd, Glyntrefnant, Maestregymer,
- Carno:- Derlwyn, Llysyn, Trawsgoed.
- Llanwnog:- Caersws, Castell, Esgob, Surnant, Uwchlaw’r-coed, Wig.
- Penstrowed:- Penstowed.
- Llandinam:- Carnedd, Deddenydd, Esgair-maen, Gwern-eirin, Hengynwydd, Maesmawr, Rhydfaes, Trewyddan, Tre’r’-llan.

=== Diocese of Hereford ===
- Hyssington
- Snead
- Lydham (part):-?Aston
- Mainstone (part):-Castlewright.
- Churchstoke:- Bacheldre, Churchstoke, Hopton Isaf, Hopton Uchaf, Hurdley, Mellington, Weston Madog.
- Montgomery. As a Borough, Montgomery was not counted as a township.
- Forden:-Ackley and Hett, Cilcewydd. Edderton, Hem Magna and Parva, Lletygynfor, Munlyn, Thornbury/Gaer, Woodlustan/Pen-y-llan, Wropton/Nantcribba.
- Worthen (part):- Leighton, Rhos Goch, Trelystan.
- Talybont/Buttington:-Buttington, Trewern.
- Llanfihangel- yng-Ngheinton/Alberbury (part):-Bausley, Criggion, Middleton.

=== Diocese of St Asaph ===
- Llandrinio:- Llan, Llannerchcila, Penthryn Fawr, Penthryn Fechan, Tredrwen Feibion Gwnwas.
- Llandysilio:- Domgae, Haughton, Rhandregwynen, Rhysnant.
- Llansantffraid:-Dolwen, Tre’r llan, Llanerchremrys, Lledrod, Meliniog Fach, Meliniog Fawr.
- Llanfechain:-Bodynfol, Tre-lys, Tre’r Llan Isaf, Tre’r Llan Ichaf’ Ystumgynon.
- Llanfyllin:-Bachie, Bodfach, Bodran, Bodyddon, Brynelltyn, Camen, Garth-gell, Globwll, Nantallan, Rhiwnachor, Rhysgog.
- Llanrhaeadr-ym-Mochnant (part):- Brithdir, Castellmoch, Cefn-coch, Glanhafon Fach, Glanhafon Fawr, Nantfyllon.
- Pennant Melangell:- Rhiwarth -:Rhiwarth
- Llangynog:- Hendre Fawr, Tre’r Llan, Cablyd, Cwm-llech, Llechwedd -y-Garth, Pengwern.
- Hirnant:- Cwmwr, Fedw, Tre’r Llan, Minfrwd.
- Llanwddyn:- Abermachnant Uchaf, Dwyffrwd, Garthbwlch, Tre’r Llan, Rhiwargor, Ysbyty.
- Llanfihangel yng Ngwynfa:- Cadwnfa, Cefncleisiog, Dolwar, Fach-wen, Fachvel, Fynnonarthur, Garth Uchaf, Halfen, Llaethbwlch, Llwydiarth, Nantycyndy, Rhiwlas.
- Meifod:- Cefnllyfnog, Cil, Cwm, Dyffryn, Main, Nantymerchiaid, Peniarth, Teirtref, Trefedryd, Trefnnanau, Ystumcolwyn.
- Guilsfield:- Broniarth, Burgedin, Fachoel, Garth (Guilsfield), Gungrog-fechan, Hendre-Hen, Llan,
- Welshpool:- Gungrog Fawr, Diserth, Llanerchudol, Trallong Gollen, Trefnant Fechan, Tydden-prydd, Ystradfedden Cyfronnydd'
- Castle Caereinion Castle, Cwmgoror, Gaer, Hudan and Dol, Hudanuchaf, Moedog, Nant-fforch, Sylfaaen, Trehylig, Trefnant.
- Llanfair Caereinion:-Llanvair, Rhewhiriaeth, Rhos Aflo, Pentyrch, Llanloddian, Ucha and Isa, Brynglas, Gwaunynog Uchaf and Isaf, Dolged, Brynelen, Cilcrych, Peniarth, Gelligason and Heniarth.
- Llangynyw;-Blaenglesyrch, Glynceiriog, Llanfechan, Rhiw’rgwreidden.
- Llanerfyl:- Llysyn, Coed Talog, Cynniwyll, Cran, Cefnllys Ucha, Cefnllys Isa.
- Llangadfan:- Blowty, Brynwaeddan, Cowny, Cyffin, Tre’r Llan, Maesllymystyn, Moelfeliarth.
- Garthbeibio: -Garthbeibio
- Cemaes:- Brynuchel, Gwern-y-bwlch, Tafolog.
- Mallwyd (part)
- Llanwrin:- Glynceiriog, Llanfechan, Rhiw’rgwreidden.
- Machynlleth:- Dol, Garriswm, Isygarreg.
- Penegoes:- Is-y-coed, Uwch-y-coed.
- Darowen:-Caerseddfan, Noddfa.
- Llanbrynmair:- Dolgadfan, Pennant, Rhiwsaeson, Tafolwern, Tirymynach.
- Llanllurgan:-Llan, Pencoed.
- Llanwyddelan:- Pencoed, Pen-y-Maes, Treganol.
- Manafon:- Dwyriw, Manafon Gaenog, Manafon-llan, Manafon-llys.
- Berriew:- Allt Isa, Brithdir, Brynmaescameisier, Cil, Cilcochwyn, Fach-hir, Faenor Isaf, Faenor Uchaf, Ffridd and Pen-y-wern, Gathmyl, Llandinier, Llifor, Pentryn, Trwstllywelyn.
- Llandyssil:- Bolbro, Bronywood, Bryntalch, Rhandir.
- Bettws Cedewain:- Dolforwyn, Gartgelyn, Llanithion, Ucheldre.
- Tregynon:- Aberhale, llanfechan, Pyllau.
- Aberhafesb:- Aberhabfesb.
- Llanllwchaiarn:-Aberbechan, Cilcowen, Gwestydd, Hendidle.
- Llanmerewig:-Llanmerewig
- Newtown:-Newtown/Dyffryn Llanfair

=== Diocese of St Davids ===
- Mochdre;- Esgairgeilog, Mochre-llan
- Kerry:-Bachaethlon, Brynnllyarch, Caeliberisaf, Caeliberuchaf, Cefnyberen, Cefnymynech, Cilthriew, Cloddiau, Gartheilin, Goetre, Graig, Gwenthriw, Gwernescob, Gwern-y-go, Maenllwyd, Pengelli, Trefor and Ffin, Tre’r-llan, Wig and Dolfor.
