= Van, Llanidloes =

Hamlet in Powys, Wales

Coordinates: 52.4746°N 3.5464°W

Y Fan Van
- Location within Powys
- OS grid reference: SN950874
- Community: Llanidloes Without
- Principal area: Powys
- Preserved county: Powys
- Country: Wales
- Sovereign state: United Kingdom
- Post town: LLANIDLOES
- Postcode district: SY18
- Dialling code: 01686
- Police: Dyfed-Powys
- Fire: Mid and West Wales
- Ambulance: Welsh
- UK Parliament: Montgomeryshire and Glyndŵr
- Senedd Cymru – Welsh Parliament: Montgomeryshire

Van (Welsh: Y Fan) is a hamlet in Powys, Mid Wales, located to the north west of Llanidloes. Its name, an anglicisation of the local Welsh placename "Fan" or in full "Y Fan" (which are also used), is believed to originate from the names of two ancient farms in the area; Manledd Uchaf and Manledd Isaf.

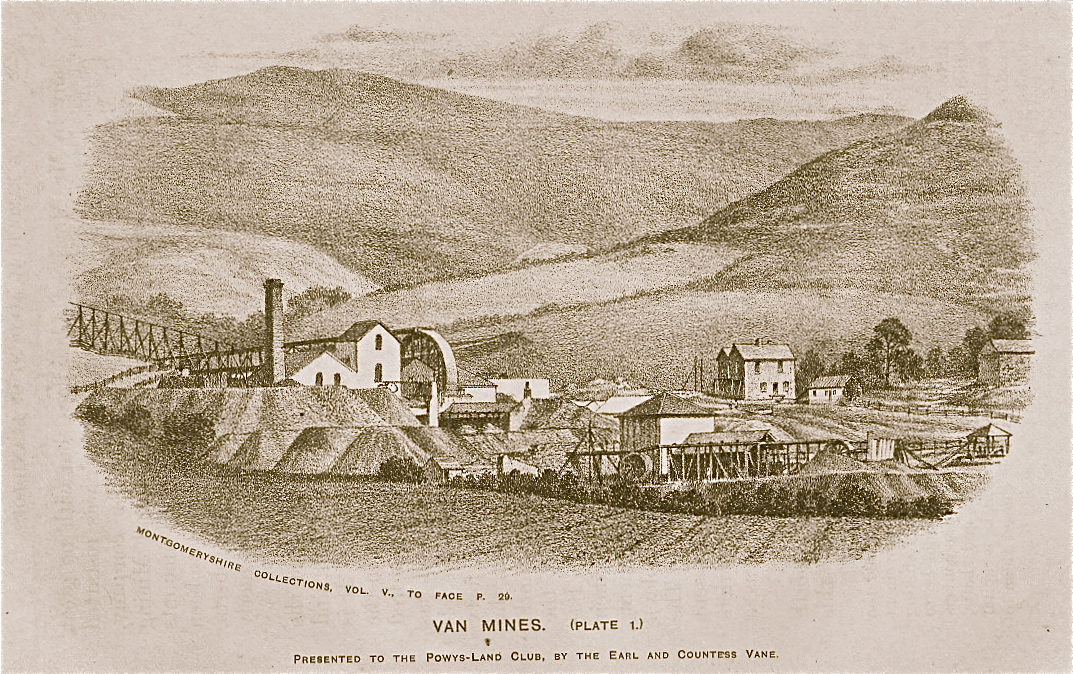
Van Lead Mines

The hamlet grew in the 19th century with the discovery of large deposits of lead, and a thriving lead mine was developed. At one point during the late 19th century 'Van Mine' was the most productive in Europe. The mines declined under pressure from foreign imports in the early 20th century plus mis-management, and operations ceased in the inter-war period. The name Van is also given to the small lake located just outside the village, Van Pool (Welsh: Pwll y Fan).
