= Cefn Carnedd =

- Location within Powys
- 52°29′56″N 3°26′57″W
- Type: Hillfort
- Periods: Iron Age
- Location: Near Caersws, Wales
- OS grid reference: SO 016 900

Site notes
- Length: 437 metres (1,434 ft)
- Width: 84 metres (276 ft)
- Area: 6 hectares (15 acres)

Cefn Carnedd is an Iron Age hillfort, about 1.5 miles (2 km) south-west of Caersws, in Powys, Wales. It is a scheduled monument.

It is on a hill overlooking the River Severn to the east, and Afon Cerist and Afon Trannon to the north; there is a river confluence to the north-east, between the fort and Caersws.

== Description ==
The fort is about 437 metres (1,434 ft) by 84 metres (276 ft) orientated north-east to south-west, aligned with the shape of the hill; it encloses an area of about 6 hectares (15 acres). There are triple banks and ditches on the north-west side, and there are entrances in the north-east and south-west.

In an early phase, there was a smaller fort of 1.6 hectares (4.0 acres) at the south-west end, traces of the north-east rampart of this being visible in aerial photographs. There is a straight bank and ditch across the interior, which was built at a late stage.

== History ==
It is thought that the fort may have been a stronghold of the Ordovices, and it is one of the locations suggested as the site of Caratacus' last battle in AD 51, when he was defeated by the Romans.

== See also ==
- Hillforts in Britain
- List of Scheduled prehistoric Monuments in Powys (Montgomeryshire)
