= Craig Rhiwarth =

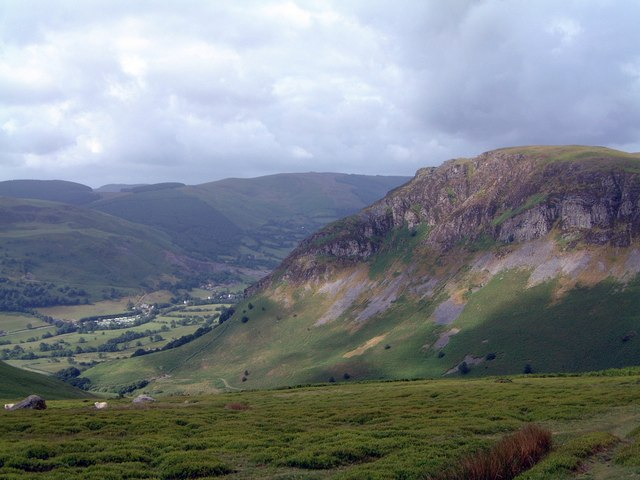

- Location within Powys
- 52°49′58″N 3°24′7″W
- Type: Hillfort
- Periods: Bronze Age; Iron Age
- Location: Near Llangynog, Wales
- OS grid reference: SJ 056 270

Site notes
- Elevation: 532 m (1,745 ft)

Craig Rhiwarth is a mountain in the Berwyn range, in Powys (formerly Montgomeryshire), Wales, overlooking the village of Llangynog to the south. On the summit is an Iron Age hillfort, and there are remains of slate quarrying on the southern slopes.

== Prehistoric remains ==
The altitude of Craig Rhiwarth is 532 metres (1,745 ft); the hillfort is one of the highest in Wales. The size of the enclosure is about 850 metres (2,790 ft) east to west by 400–500 metres (1,300–1,600 ft). The site has precipitous slopes on all sides except the north: on this side there is a ruinous stone wall above a scarp. There is a simple entrance near the centre of the wall and a slanting entrance at the west end.

Within this area are the foundations of about 170 circular stone structures, of diameter 4–12 metres (13–39 ft). It is thought that the settlement may have begun in the late Bronze Age and continued into the Iron Age, and that its function probably ceased by the time of the Roman conquest in the 1st century A.D. There are also a few rectangular hafodydd, probably of medieval date, relating to seasonal settlement.

== Slate quarries ==
On the southern slopes of Craig Rhiwarth are the remains of slate quarries. A, quarry is known to have been there by 1705. There was much activity in the early 19th century, but this declined later in the century; there was revival in the early 20th century, when the Tanat Valley Light Railway opened. Final closure was in 1940–41.

== See also ==
- Hillforts in Britain
- List of Scheduled prehistoric Monuments in Powys (Montgomeryshire)
