= List of civil parishes in England =

This is a list of civil parishes in England split by ceremonial county (see map below). The civil parish is the one but lowest level of local government in England. Parish councils are the first tier.

== Unparished areas ==
In addition to the London boroughs (except Westminster) and the City of London, the following districts are entirely unparished:

- Blackpool,
- Bristol,
- Broxbourne,
- Bury,
- Cambridge,
- Crawley,
- Derby,
- Dudley,
- Eastbourne,
- Epsom and Ewell,
- Exeter,
- Fareham,
- Gosport,
- Harlow,
- Hastings,
- Havant,
- Ipswich,
- Kingston upon Hull,
- Leicester,
- Lincoln,
- Liverpool,
- Luton,
- North Tyneside,
- Norwich,
- Nottingham,
- Nuneaton and Bedworth,
- Oadby and Wigston,
- Plymouth,
- Portsmouth,
- Reading,
- Rochdale,
- Runnymede,
- Rushmoor,
- Salford,
- Sandwell,
- Southampton,
- South Tyneside,
- Spelthorne,
- Stevenage,
- Stockport,
- Stoke-on-Trent,
- Tamworth,
- Thurrock,
- Walsall,
- Watford,
- Wirral,
- Woking,
- Wolverhampton,
- Worthing

The following districts only have one or two parishes:

- Birmingham,
- Brighton and Hove,
- Castle Point,
- Chesterfield,
- Elmbridge,
- Gateshead,
- Gloucester,
- Hyndburn,
- Manchester,
- Mansfield,
- Middlesbrough,
- Oldham,
- Redditch,
- Reigate and Banstead,
- Rossendale,
- Slough,
- Southend-on-Sea,
- Tameside,
- Torbay,
- Westminster,
- Worcester

In contrast, the following districts are entirely parished:

- Arun,
- Babergh,
- Blaby,
- Bolsover,
- Bournemouth, Christchurch and Poole,
- Bracknell Forest,
- Breckland,
- Broadland,
- Central Bedfordshire,
- Cherwell,
- Cheshire East,
- Chichester,
- Cotswold,
- Craven,
- Derbyshire Dales,
- Dover,
- East Cambridgeshire,
- East Devon,
- East Hampshire,
- East Hertfordshire,
- East Lindsey,
- East Staffordshire,
- East Suffolk,
- Epping Forest,
- Fenland,
- Folkestone and Hythe,
- Forest of Dean,
- Hambleton,
- Hart,
- Herefordshire,
- Horsham,
- Huntingdonshire,
- Isle of Wight,
- Isles of Scilly,
- Lewes,
- Lichfield,
- Maldon,
- Malvern Hills,
- Mid Devon,
- Mid Suffolk,
- Mid Sussex,
- Milton Keynes,
- New Forest,
- Newark and Sherwood,
- North Devon,
- North East Derbyshire,
- North Kesteven,
- North Norfolk,
- North Northamptonshire,
- North Somerset,
- North Warwickshire,
- Northumberland,
- Pendle,
- Ribble Valley,
- Richmondshire,
- Rochford,
- Rutland,
- Ryedale,
- Selby,
- Sevenoaks,
- Shropshire,
- Somerset
- South Cambridgeshire,
- South Hams,
- South Norfolk,
- South Oxfordshire,
- South Staffordshire,
- Staffordshire Moorlands,
- Stratford-on-Avon,
- Stroud,
- Swindon,
- Tandridge,
- Teignbridge,
- Telford and Wrekin,
- Test Valley,
- Tewkesbury,
- Uttlesford,
- Vale of White Horse,
- Warwick,
- Waverley,
- Wealden,
- West Berkshire,
- West Devon,
- West Lindsey,
- West Northamptonshire,
- West Oxfordshire,
- West Suffolk,
- Westmorland and Furness,
- Wiltshire,
- Wokingham,
- Wychavon
- Wyre Forest

The following districts are entirely parished apart from unpopulated offshore areas:

- Cornwall,
- East Riding of Yorkshire.

== 10 largest civil parishes ==
Parish	County or unitary authority	Area (hectares)
Stanhope	Durham	25,557
Dartmoor Forest	Devon	20,482
Tarset	Northumberland	18,764
Rochester	Northumberland	17,920
Biddlestone	Northumberland	17,908
Alston Moor	Westmorland and Furness	14,949
Bradfield	Sheffield	14,292
Kielder	Northumberland	14,223
Lakes	Westmorland and Furness	12,970
Muker	North Yorkshire	12,210

== See also ==
- Parish councils in England
- List of the most populous civil parishes in England
- List of civil parishes in Scotland
- List of communities in Wales
- List of community council areas in Scotland
- Parish (ecclesiastical)
