= Breidden Hill =

Hill in Powys, Wales

Coordinates: 52°43′N 3°03′W

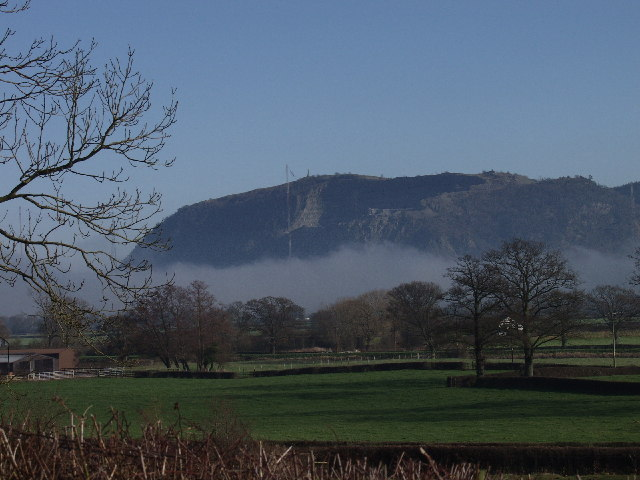
Breidden Hill

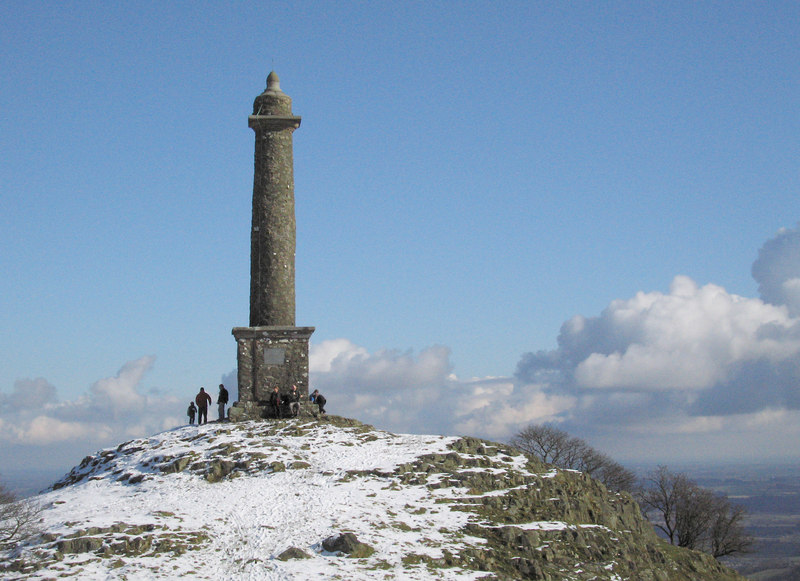
Rodney's Pillar on Breidden Hill

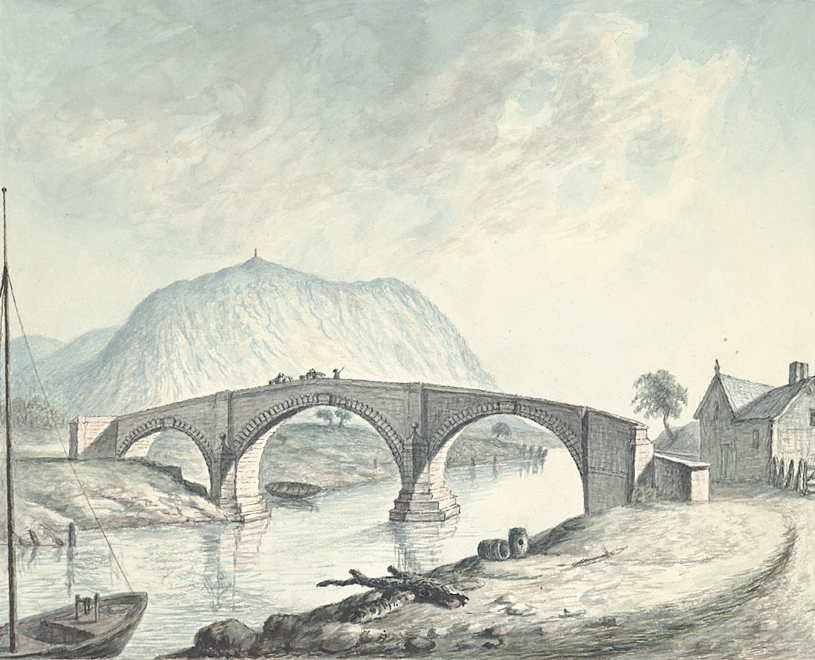
Llandrinio Bridge and Rodney's Pillar, 1794

Breidden Hill is a steep-sided hill in Powys, Wales, near the town of Welshpool. It is immediately surrounded by the villages of Trewern, Middletown, Criggion, Crew Green and Llandrinio. The peak of the hill reaches to 367 metres (1,204 ft). Footpaths which lead up to the summit provide excellent 360 degree views over Powys and over the border with England to the Shropshire Plain.

Breidden Hill is one of five peaks with neighbouring Moel y Golfa, which is the highest at 403 metres (1,322 ft), which is a "Marilyn", with a prominence of 261 metres (856 ft). The three others, which are all over 800 feet (240 m) high, are Cefn y Castell (also known as Middletown Hill), Kempsters Hill and Bausley Hill with its Iron Age galleried fortification. The five hills are sometimes collectively known as the Breidden Hills, and form a northern extension of the Long Mountain.

There are remains of a British Iron Age hillfort which may have been the site of the last stand of Caractacus. Rodney's Pillar at the top was built by the gentlemen of Montgomeryshire who supplied oak wood from the area and shipped it down the River Severn (which runs nearby at Bausley with Criggion) to Bristol where Admiral Rodney's naval fleet was built. Rodney's Pillar is increasingly being used as a navigational aid by helicopter pilots in this area, due to its visibility from large areas of Wales. On 27 June 2018, a wildfire broke out on Breidden Hill, destroying an area of grassland close to Rodney's Pillar.

Beginning around 1789, for many years members of the Breidden Society, founded by John Dovaston (1740–1808), met near Rodney's Pillar for an annual festival of food, drink, poetry, and song; records of their meetings for 1809–15 are preserved at the Houghton Library of Harvard University (MS Eng 1168).

== Geology ==
The hill is largely formed from a mass of gabbroic-dolerite which is exploited for roadstone at the large Criggion Quarry excavated into its western and northern sides. This rock was intruded into the mudstones of the surrounding Stone House Shales Formation in the form of a laccolith during the Ordovician period. An alternative interpretation is that the intrusion takes the form of a sill. A separate intrusion of andesitic magma forms Moel y Golfa whilst Middletown Hill and the lower summits to its northeast are formed from tuffs and volcaniclastic material which form the Caradoc age Bulthy Formation. The hills are largely devoid of superficial deposits though the low ground between the summits is mantled with glacial till.

The quarry was already operating prior to the construction of a railway link in 1866, a line which continued to serve it until 1959. A key product in earlier years were road setts but crushed roadstone was the main output by 1912. It was operated as a single 200m high face before being benched in 1967. Output peaked at 350,000 tonnes a year in 1973. The presence of the minerals chlorite and epidote give the quarried rock its characteristic green colour. Material quarried in the upper part of the workings drops via a steep chute bored through the hill to a tunnel leading to the processing works below.

== See also ==
- List of hillforts in Wales
