= Nicholas Bennett (historian) =

Welsh historian and musician (1823–1899)

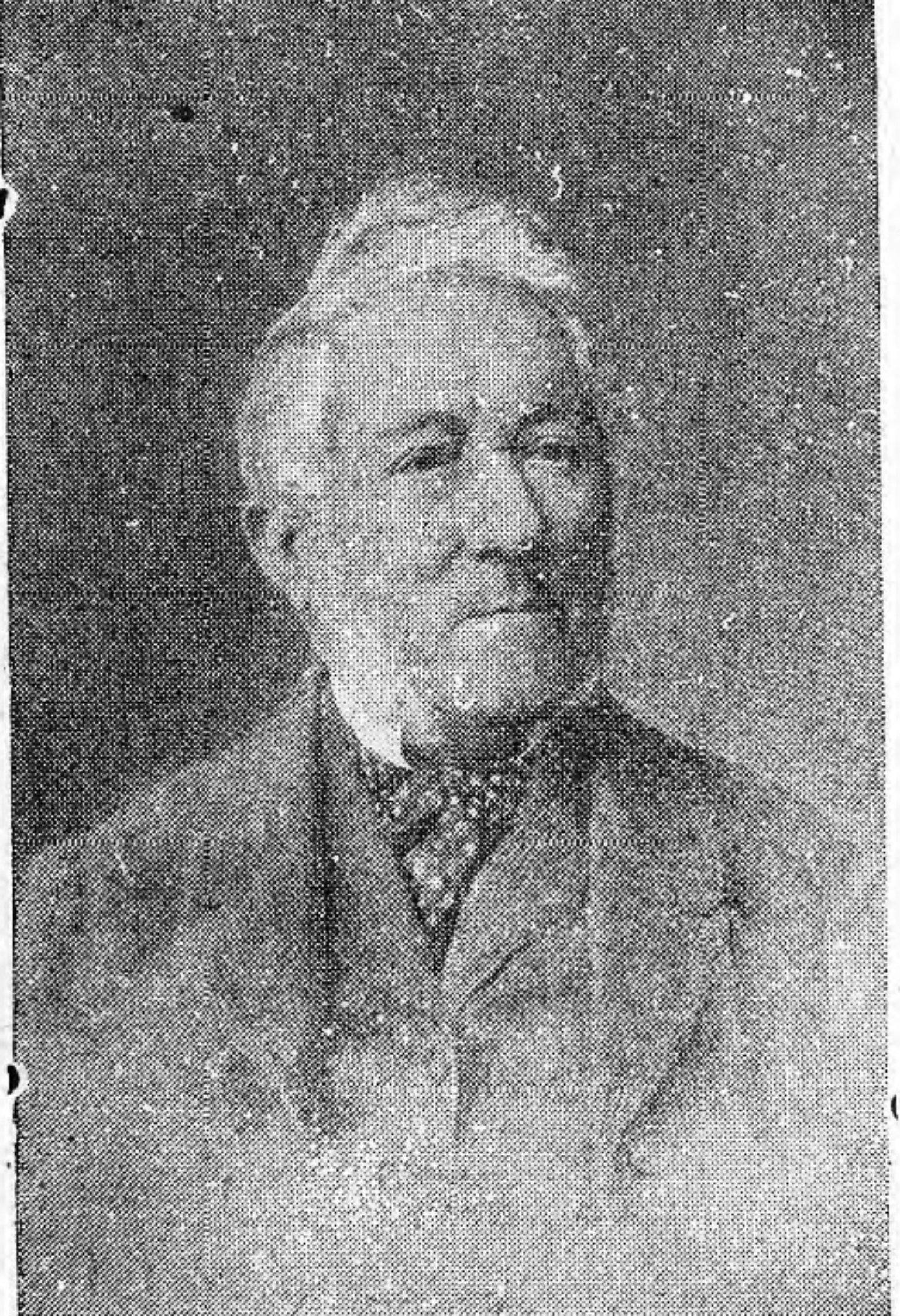
Bennett in 1896

Nicholas Bennett (8 May 1823 – 18 August 1899) was a Welsh historian and musician.

He was born on 8 May 1823, in Glanrafon, Trefeglwys. His collection of musical works included over 700 Welsh airs. He wrote the songs "Y Cerddor" and "Songs of the Four Nations". He died on 18 August 1899, aged 76, and is buried in Llanfihangel, Trefeglwys.
