= Llanidloes Without =

- Population: 661
- OS grid reference: SN 9230 8679
- Principal area: Powys
- Country: Wales
- Sovereign state: United Kingdom
- Post town: LLANIDLOES
- Postcode district: SY18
- Police: Dyfed-Powys
- Fire: Mid and West Wales
- Ambulance: Welsh
- UK Parliament: Montgomeryshire and Glyndŵr
- Website: Llanidloes-Without Community Council
- List of places UK Wales Powys 52.468386°N 3.586819°W Map of the community

Llanidloes Without is a rural community in north Powys (Montgomeryshire), Wales. Settlements within the community include Van, Oakley Park and Glan-y-nant.

== Geography ==
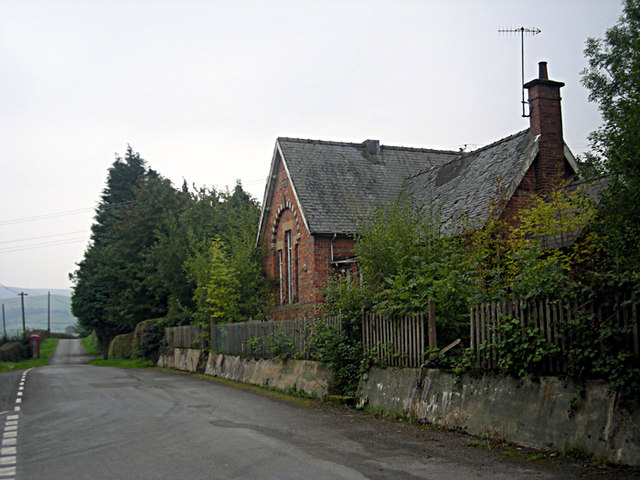
The old school at Oakley Park

Llanidloes Without is a rural community with few settlements, located in Mid-Wales. It surrounds the town of Llanidloes on three sides, but does not include it. Its boundaries include Llyn Clywedog Lake in the north and the River Severn to the south. It is bordered by the Powys communities of Trefeglwys to the north, Llangurig to the south, Llandinam to the east and shares a small border with the Ceredigion community of Blaenrheidol to the west.

The community had a population of 661 according to the 2011 UK Census, of which 370 were born in Wales.

== Governance ==
Llanidloes Without has its own community council, comprising seven community councillors and a clerk, who oversee planning applications and other issues of local interest.

The community is part of the Blaen Hafren electoral ward (with the neighbouring Llangurig and Trefeglwys communities) which sends a county councillor to sit on Powys County Council.
