= Llangynog =

- Village and community
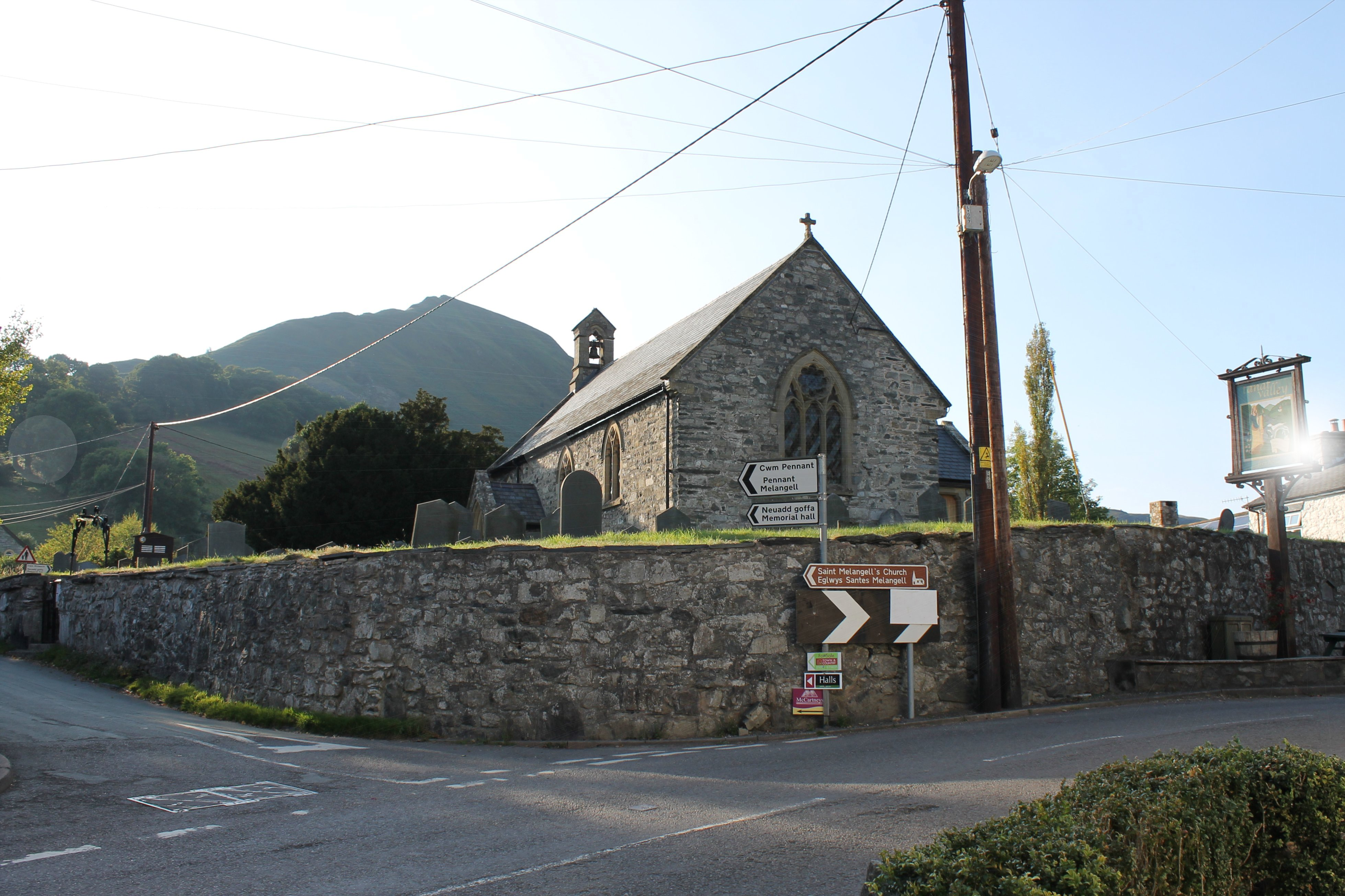
- St Cynog Church

- Location within Powys
- Principal area: Powys
- Country: Wales
- Sovereign state: United Kingdom
- Police: Dyfed-Powys
- Fire: Mid and West Wales
- Ambulance: Welsh
- List of places UK Wales Powys 52.825°N 3.406°W Community map: Map of the community

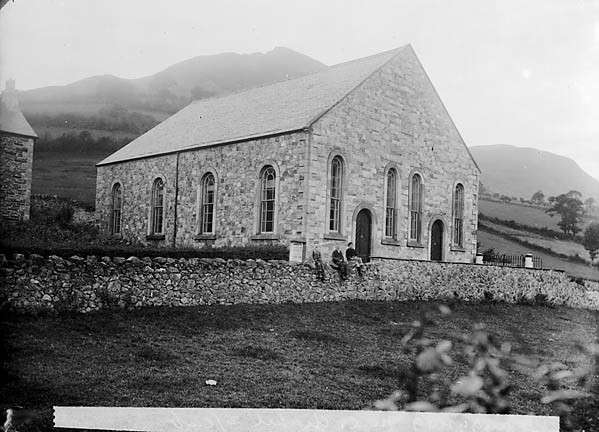
Penuel chapel around 1885

Llangynog (Welsh pronunciation; grid reference SJ053261) is a village and community at the confluence of the Afon Eirth and the Afon Tanat at the foot of the Berwyn range in north Powys (previously Montgomeryshire), Wales.

It lies at the foot of the Milltir Cerrig mountain pass on the B4391 road, which runs between Llan Ffestiniog and Llanfyllin (though the B4391 road number 'disappears' between the western end of Llyn Celyn and Bala).

It is surrounded by mountains including Craig Rhiwarth and is a popular base for walkers. Llangynog has a down-hill mountain bike course, and a crown green bowling club, who play in the Oswestry League.

It was the western terminus of the Tanat Valley Light Railway (Llynclys - Llangynog) (15 miles); it opened on 5 January 1904 and closed (passenger traffic) in 1951.

It is close to the pilgrimage shrine of Saint Melangell at the church of Pennant Melangell (grid reference SJ024265).

The community of Pen-y-Bont-Fawr neighbours the community of Llangynog and has a population of 440 as of the 2011 UK Census.

It falls under the Llanwddyn electoral ward for elections to Powys County Council.

== Demographics ==
Llangynog's population was 339, according to the 2011 census; a 5.60% increase since the 321 people noted in 2001.

The 2011 census showed 36.7% of the population could speak Welsh, a fall from 50.6% in 2001, reportedly due to an influx of residents from the West Midlands.

== See also ==
- Cambrian Railways
