= Trewern =

- Location within Powys
- Population: 1,430 (2011)
- OS grid reference: SJ279113
- Principal area: Powys
- Preserved county: Powys
- Country: Wales
- Sovereign state: United Kingdom
- Post town: WELSHPOOL
- Postcode district: SY21
- Dialling code: 01938
- Police: Dyfed-Powys
- Fire: Mid and West Wales
- Ambulance: Welsh
- UK Parliament: Montgomeryshire and Glyndŵr
- Senedd Cymru – Welsh Parliament: Montgomeryshire
- List of places UK Wales Powys 52.695°N 3.067°W Community map: Map of the community

Trewern is a small village, community and electoral ward in Montgomeryshire, Powys, Wales. The community includes the villages of Buttington and Middletown, situated 4.5 miles (7.2 km) northeast of Welshpool, 14.5 miles (23.3 km) west of Shrewsbury and 1 mile (1.6 km) west of the Wales-England border.

== Etymology ==
The word Trewern is Welsh, formed from the words "tre" meaning town and "gwern" meaning alder (a tree), thus town of the alder or, more likely, alders.

== Location ==
It is situated on the A458 road, between the towns of Newtown, Shrewsbury and Welshpool. It has a public bus running to these towns. The Afon Pwll Trewern and Afon Pwll Bychan pass near the village.

== Attractions & amenities ==
Although only a small village, there is a primary school, 'Ysgol Gynradd Buttington Trewern', with pupils travelling from miles around. The school also has a public children's play area. Trewern has an extinct volcano in form of Moel y Golfa, Cefn y Castell and Breidden Hill.

Trewern Hall is a half-timbered house in the village dating from the late 16th century. It is Grade II* listed.

=== Sports ===
In football, Trewern has been represented by Trewern United F.C. since they reformed in 2016.

== Governance ==
Trewern has a community council representing the views of the community and has ten community councillors.

The Trewern ward elects a county councillor to Powys County Council. From 1995 it was represented by an independent councillor, and by a Conservative since 2017.
