= Aberhafesp =

Aberhafesp: Welsh: Aberhafesb
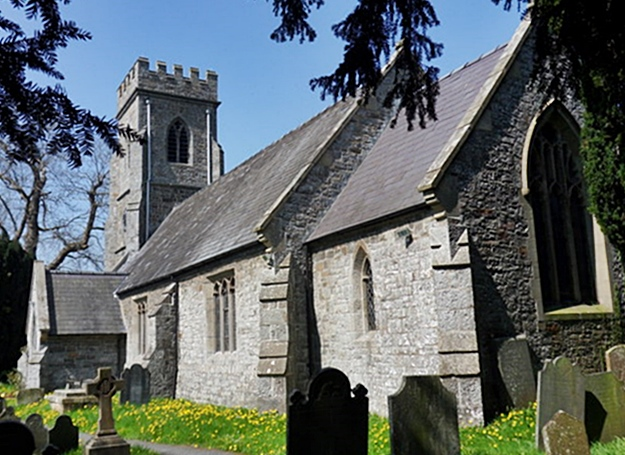
- St Gwynog's church

- Location within Powys
- Population: 416 (2011)
- OS grid reference: SO069923
- Principal area: Powys
- Preserved county: Powys
- Country: Wales
- Sovereign state: United Kingdom
- Post town: NEWTOWN
- Postcode district: SY16
- Dialling code: 01686
- Police: Dyfed-Powys
- Fire: Mid and West Wales
- Ambulance: Welsh
- UK Parliament: Montgomeryshire and Glyndŵr
- Senedd Cymru – Welsh Parliament: Montgomeryshire
- Website: Aberhafesp council site
- List of places UK Wales Powys 52.5209°N 3.3732°W Community map: Map of the community

Aberhafesp (Welsh: Aberhafesb) is a small village and community in Montgomeryshire, Powys, Wales. The hamlet of Bwlch-y-Ffridd is within the community.

It is situated about five miles west of Newtown on the B4568 close to the River Severn.

The church of St Gwynog dates back to the 13th century but was largely rebuilt in 1857.
