= Carno =

Village in Powys, Wales

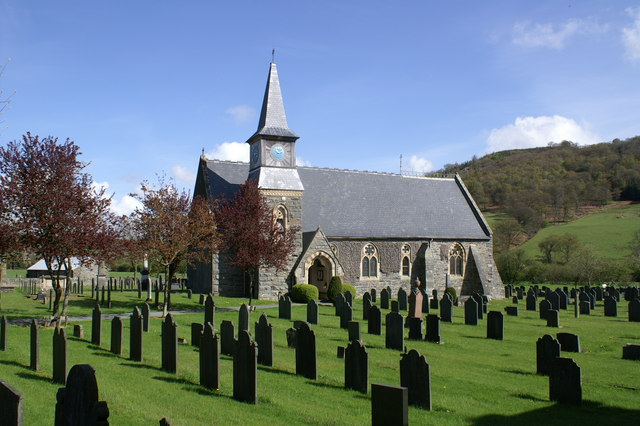
- Church of St John the Baptist, Carno

- Location within Powys
- Population: 730 (2011)
- OS grid reference: SN961965
- Principal area: Powys
- Preserved county: Powys
- Country: Wales
- Sovereign state: United Kingdom
- Post town: CAERSWS
- Postcode district: SY17
- Dialling code: 01686
- Police: Dyfed-Powys
- Fire: Mid and West Wales
- Ambulance: Welsh
- UK Parliament: Montgomeryshire and Glyndŵr
- Senedd Cymru – Welsh Parliament: Montgomeryshire
- List of places UK Wales Powys 52.5565°N 3.5319°W Community map: Map of the community

Carno is a village and community in Powys, Wales. It was also a parish in the historic county of Montgomeryshire, comprising the townships of Derlwyn, Llysyn and Trowscoed. It is in the geographical centre of Wales.

== History ==
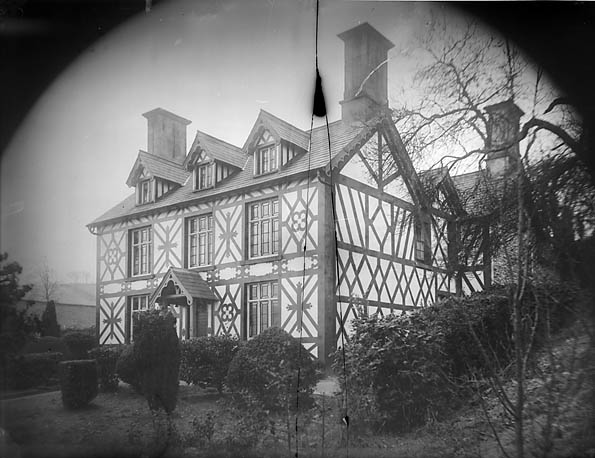
Carno house, c.1885.

A Roman Fort named Gaer Noddfa is located next to the churchyard on the bank of the Afon Carno. The site encompasses a rectangular area 450 feet (140 m) by 270 feet (82 m). A large mound occupies part of the fort; pottery found nearby indicate medieval usage but suggestions that it was a Norman fortification like a motte have been rejected.

In 952, Iago and Ieuaf, the two exiled sons of Idwal Foel, King of Gwynedd, invaded Dyfed. But they were defeated in a decisive battle near Carno by the sons of Hywel Dda, King of Deheubarth. The victory secured the sovereignty of North Wales.

A Grade II* 16th century timber-framed house, Plasau Duon, is near the village.

In 1977 the Manor House Plas Llysyn was put under surveillance and raided as part of Operation Julie, and found to be an LSD factory. The well that supplied the house was destroyed to investigate the contents. £500,000,000 of LSD was manufactured in the cellars here, supplying 50% of the world's LSD at the time.

=== 1991 mid-air collision ===
On Thursday 29 August 1991 at 12.54pm, a Cessna F152 from Halfpenny Green, was hit and the pilot killed instantly.

The other aircraft SEPECAT Jaguar T.2A 'XX843', from RAF Coltishall was from 54 Sqn. When the Jaguar crashed, it killed 12 sheep and 2 cats. Both pilots ejected. One of Jaguar pilots was killed, 40 year old John Mardon, who had recently had a heart-lung transplant; the other pilot was injured.

== Geography ==
The Afon Carno rises near the watershed with the Afon Dyfi; and runs 9 miles south-eastward to the River Severn, 2¼ miles north of Llandinam. The village's name is supposedly derived from the Welsh language word for cairn (carnedd), as there are many ancient cairns on the hills surrounding the village.

An electoral ward, which includes the nearby village of Caersws, had a population of 2,316 in 2011.

== Transport ==
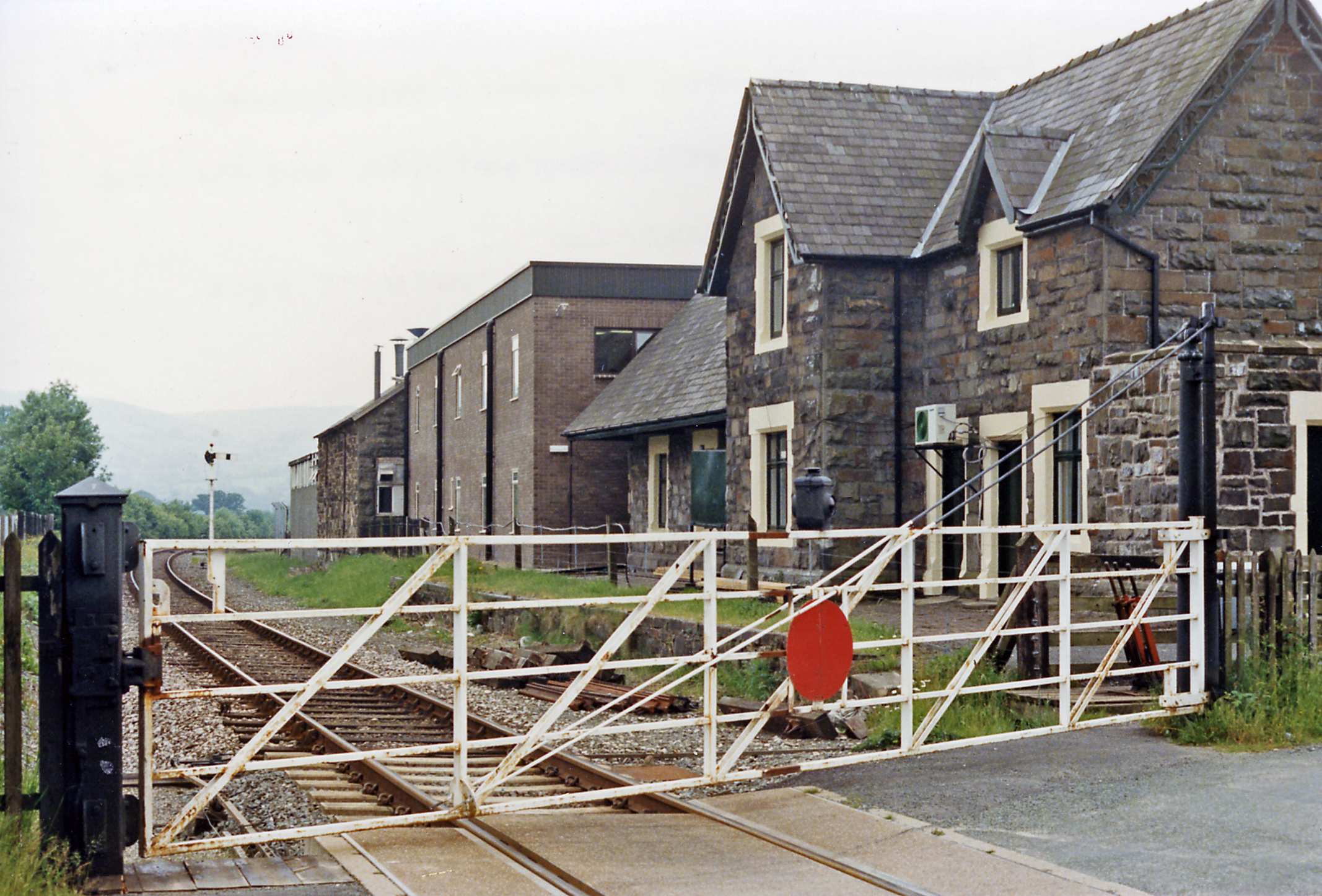
The former railway station in 1986

Carno station was opened by the Newtown and Machynlleth Railway in 1863. It was closed, along with a number of stations on the Cambrian Line, as part of the Beeching cuts in the 1960s. In 2002, a campaign began to reopen a station near the village; in 2009, the Welsh Assembly agreed to examine the proposal as part of the Cambrian Rail Study.

In 2014, the Welsh Assembly confirmed Arriva Trains Wales and Network Rail broadly agreed with an independent report recommending the reopening of a station at Carno. However, a new station would need to be built as the original Victorian building (which was incorporated into the former Laura Ashley factory) is in private ownership.

The A470 road between Llanbrynmair and Caersws passes through the village. This part of the route follows the course of the Afon Carno through hilly country.

== Notable people ==
- Sir Bernard and Laura Ashley moved from Kent to Carno in 1961. The company's original factory was in the village, adjoining the station building; it closed in 2005.
- The parents of Chicago Outfit gangster, Morris Llewellyn Humphreys, Bryan Humphreys and Ann Wigley, emigrated to the United States from the village in the late 19th century. Plaid Cymru politician Dafydd Wigley is his third cousin.
