= Trefeglwys =

- Location within Powys
- Population: 910 (2011)
- OS grid reference: SN971902
- Principal area: Powys
- Preserved county: Powys
- Country: Wales
- Sovereign state: United Kingdom
- Post town: CAERSWS
- Postcode district: SY17
- Post town: LLANBRYNMAIR
- Postcode district: SY19
- Dialling code: 01686
- Police: Dyfed-Powys
- Fire: Mid and West Wales
- Ambulance: Welsh
- UK Parliament: Montgomeryshire and Glyndŵr
- Senedd Cymru – Welsh Parliament: Montgomeryshire
- List of places UK Wales Powys 52.50°N 3.51667°W Community map: Map of the community

Trefeglwys is a village and community in Powys, Wales, within the historic county of Montgomeryshire.

The name derives from the Welsh language tref 'township' and eglwys 'church'. The village sits on the Afon Trannon. Amenities in the village include a public house, garage, parish church, Nonconformist chapel, primary school, village hall and playground.

The community includes the settlements of Llawryglyn and Staylittle.

== Historical context ==
Historically, the parish of Trefeglwys includes the townships of Bodaioch, Maestrefgomer, Esgeirieth and Dolgwden. In a rural area, the parish of Trefeglwys is about eight miles (13 km) long by three miles (4.8 km) wide.

== Notable people ==
- John Breynton (1719–1799), chaplain in the Royal Navy, minister in Halifax, Nova Scotia, Canada.
- Nicholas Bennett (1823–1899), historian and musician, born in Glanrafon
- Maldwyn Jones Griffith OBE (1940–2020), consultant orthopaedic surgeon
- Phil Mills (born 1963), is a Welsh rally racing co-driver.
- David Higgins (born 1972), 2012 Rally America Champion Driver, lives in Trefeglwys
