= Bausley with Criggion =

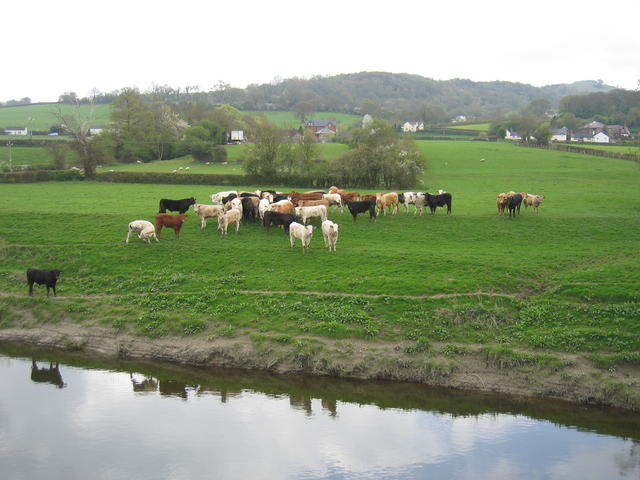
- Cattle beside the River Severn
- Population: 706
- OS grid reference: SJ 316 151
  - Cardiff: 86.6 mi (139.4 km)
  - London: 148.5 mi (239.0 km)
- Community: Bausley with Criggion
- Principal area: Powys
- Country: Wales
- Sovereign state: United Kingdom
- Post town: SHREWSBURY
- Postcode district: SY5
- Dialling code: 01743, 01938
- Police: Dyfed-Powys
- Fire: Mid and West Wales
- Ambulance: Welsh
- UK Parliament: Montgomeryshire and Glyndŵr
- Senedd Cymru – Welsh Parliament: Montgomeryshire
- Website: Bausley with Criggion Communmity Council
- List of places UK Wales Powys 52°43′44″N 3°00′50″W Map of the community

Bausley with Criggion is a community in Montgomeryshire, Powys, Wales, 87 miles (140 km) from Cardiff and 148 miles (238 km) from London.

The Bausley and Criggion Community Council dates back to at least 1761. Villages within the community include Criggion, Crewgreen and Coedway.

In 2011 the population of Bausley with Criggion was 706 with 7.8% of them able to speak Welsh. In terms of Welsh identity, the community had the lowest percentage in the whole of Powys.

The Criggion Radio Station is located in this community, a transmitter latterly operated by BT on behalf of the UK Ministry of Defence. The Church of St Michael and All Angels, Criggion, is a Grade II* listed building.

The Bausley with Criggion Community Council has eight locally elected councillors who represent the community's opinions and interests.

Wales football international Stan Rowlands was born at Coedway in 1889. He went on to make Football League appearances for Wrexham, Nottingham Forest and Crewe Alexandra.

== See also ==
- List of localities in Wales by population
