= Community (Wales) =

Lowest tier of local government in Wales

Community Cymuned (Welsh)
- Map of Welsh communities as of 2021
- Category: Parish
- Location: Wales
- Found in: Principal areas (counties/county boroughs)
- Created by: Local Government Act 1972
- Created: 1 April 1974
- Number: 878
- Possible types: City; Community; Town
- Government: Community council; Town council; City council

A community (Welsh: cymuned) is a division of land that forms the lowest tier of local government in Wales. Welsh communities are analogous to civil parishes in England but, unlike English parishes, communities cover the whole of Wales. There are 878 communities in Wales, with more than 730 having community and town councils.

== History ==
Until 1974, Wales was divided into civil parishes. These were abolished by section 20 (6) of the Local Government Act 1972, and replaced by communities by section 27 of the same Act. The principal areas of Wales are divided entirely into communities. Unlike in England, where unparished areas exist, no part of Wales is outside a community, even in urban areas.

Most, but not all, communities are administered by community councils, which are equivalent to English parish councils in terms of their powers and the way they operate. Welsh community councils may call themselves town councils unilaterally and may have city status granted by the Crown. In Wales, all town councils are community councils. There are now three communities with city status: Bangor, St Asaph and St Davids. The chair of a town council or city council will usually have the title mayor (Welsh: maer). However, not every community has a council. In communities with populations too small to sustain a full community council, community meetings may be established. The communities in the urban areas of the cities of Cardiff, Swansea and Newport do not have community councils.

At the 2001 United Kingdom census, there were 869 communities in Wales. 84 percent, or more than 730, have a council. They vary in size from Rhayader with an area of 13,945 hectares (34,460 acres) to Cefn Fforest with an area of 64 hectares (160 acres). They ranged in population, from Barry with 45,053 recorded inhabitants to Baglan Bay with no permanent residents.

As of 2025, there are 878 communities, although the number of them having community/town councils have remained the same at 730.

The twenty-two principal area councils are required to review the community boundaries within their area every fifteen years. The councils propose changes to the Local Democracy and Boundary Commission for Wales, which prepares a report and makes recommendations to the Welsh Government. If the Welsh Government accepts the recommendations, then it implements them using a statutory instrument. For example, in 2016 four new communities were created in the City and County of Cardiff.

The legislation surrounding community councils in Wales has been amended significantly in the Local Government (Wales) Act 1994 and the Local Government (Wales) Measure 2011.

== See also ==
- List of communities in Wales
- Community councils
- Wards of the United Kingdom

== Sources ==
- Davies, John; Jenkins, Nigel; Baines, Menna; Lynch, Peredur I (2008). The Welsh Academy Encyclopaedia of Wales. Cardiff: University of Wales Press.
