= 1908 Aberdeen Corporation election =

Election

← 1907	November 3, 1908	1909 →

11 out of 34 seats of City of Aberdeen Council 17 seats needed for a majority
	First party	Second party
Party	Independent	Labour Repr. Cmte.
Seats won	11	0
Seats after	34	0
Seat change	0	0
Popular vote	2,664	1,660
Percentage	61.6%	38.4%
- Composition of Corporation after the election

An election to the Aberdeen Corporation was held on 3 November 1908, alongside municipal elections across Scotland. 11 of the corporation's 34 seats were up for election, although only 3 were contested.

The primary question in this election was the 'Water Question,' a debate of whether the city should continue to obtain drinking water from the River Dee, or if a new supply should be pulled from River Avon. Many reports had been commissioned over the years, the most recent one from Alexander Binnie and George Deacon in October 1908, which had recommended a new water intake to be constructed on the Avon near the settlement of Inchrory. Issues had been raised over pollutants coming from villages upstream of Aberdeen on the Dee, resulting in some favouring another river, while others felt attached to the Dee, desiring funding to be put towards filtration of the present system. All three Labour candidates supported the Avon scheme, while all three independents supported continuing to use the Dee.

== Ward results ==
Greyfriars
Party	Candidate	Votes	%
Independent	Thomas Gibb (incumbent)	732	58.8
Labour Repr. Cmte.	John Croll	512	41.2
Majority		220	
Turnout			
Independent hold			

Rosemount
Party	Candidate	Votes	%
Independent	John Wallace (incumbent)	875	68.3
Labour Repr. Cmte.	David Milne	407	31.7
Majority		468	
Turnout			
Independent hold			

St. Nicholas
Party	Candidate	Votes	%
Independent	Alexander Stephen	1,057	58.8
Labour Repr. Cmte.	William K. Chalmers	741	41.2
Majority		316	
Turnout			
Independent hold			
