= Dolanog =

Coordinates: 52.7031°N 3.3832°W

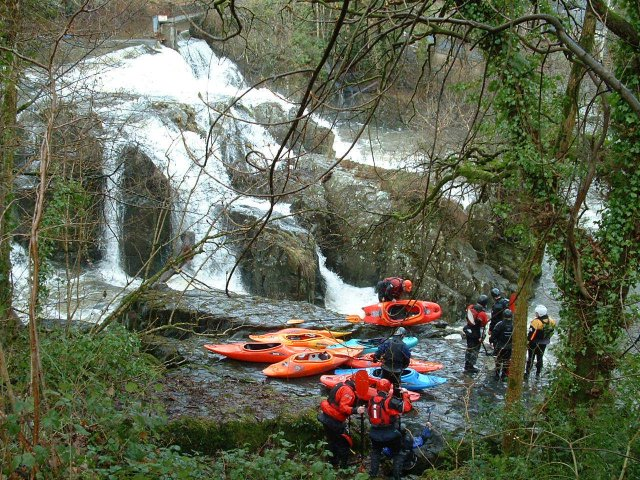
- Dolanog Falls

- Location within Powys
- OS grid reference: SJ 1012
- Principal area: Powys
- Country: Wales
- Sovereign state: United Kingdom
- Police: Dyfed-Powys
- Fire: Mid and West Wales
- Ambulance: Welsh
- UK Parliament: Montgomeryshire and Glyndŵr

Dolanog (Welsh pronunciation) or Pont Dolanog is an ecclesiastical parish or chapelry that was formed in October 1856. It comprises the townships of Dolwar in Llanfihangel portions of Coedtalog in Llanerfyl, Cynhinfa in Llangyniew and Gwaunynog in Llanfair Caereinion. The total area of this parish is 3,100 acres. Dolanog was within the historic county of Montgomeryshire, which now forms part of Powys, Wales. Dolwar Fechan in Dolanog was the home Ann Griffiths, the Methodist hymn writer.

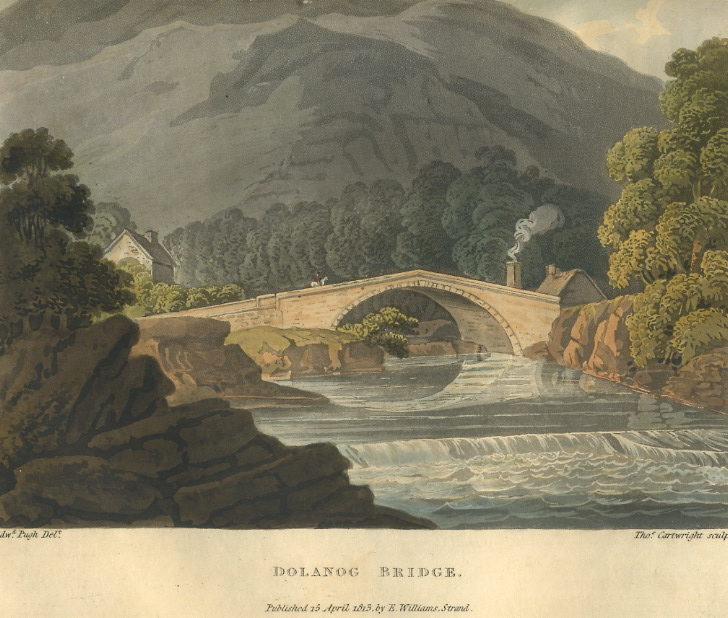
Dolanog Bridge by Edward Pugh 1816

== Description of the village ==
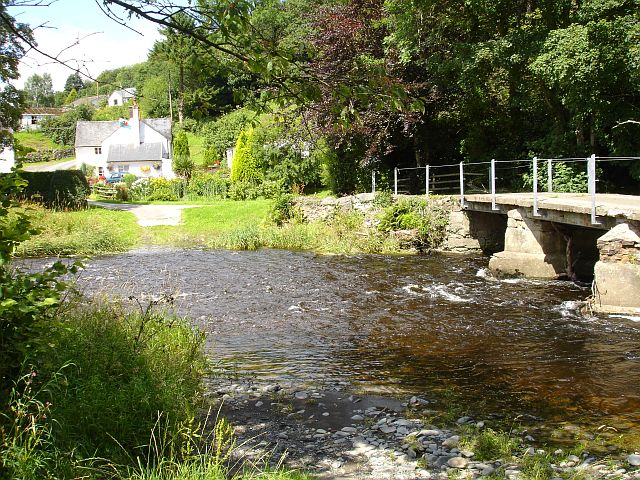
Bridge next to ford, across the Vyrnwy, Dolanog

Dolanog lies in a stretch of the Vyrnwy valley. The 17th or early 18th century single-arched bridge spans the river below the church beside a pool overhung with oaks. The ford at the lower end of the village is crossed by a footbridge raised on stone piers, near a whitewashed former Corn Mill of the later18th. century.

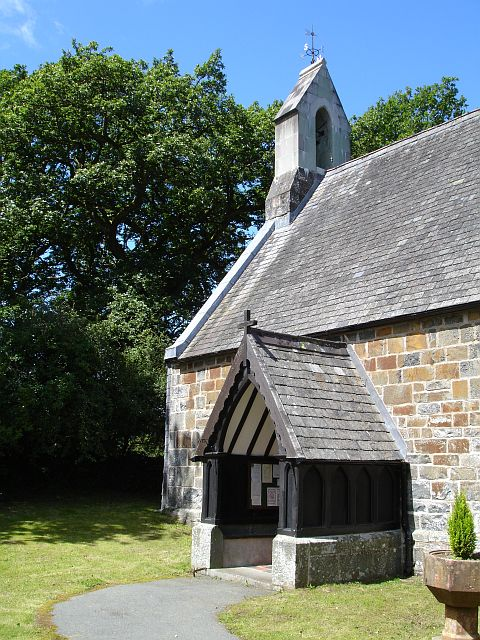
St John the Evangelist, Dolanog

Across the road, the whitewashed L-plan Mill Farmhouse was originally a fulling-mill, made into a house for the corn mill about 1810.

== Church ==
St. John the Evangelist. Nave, chancel, western bell gable and a timber south porch in Early English rival style. The architect was Richard Kyke Penson and the church was consecrated on 12 April 1855. The roof is similar to nearby Pontrobert church, which was also designed by Penson. The Church school was built in 1872 for £150.

== Ann Griffiths Memorial Chapel ==
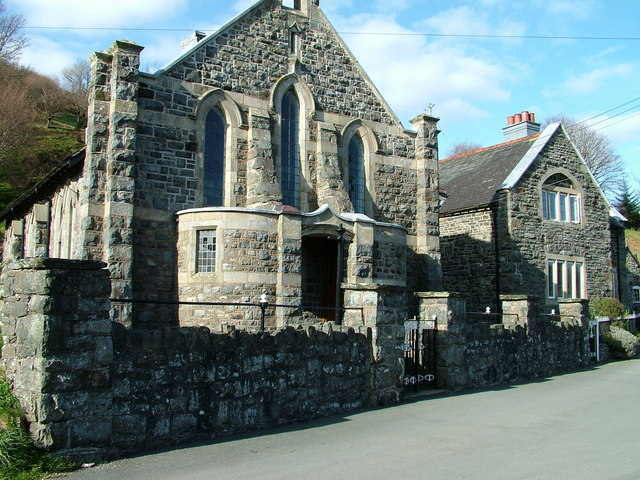
Ann Griffiths Memorial Chapel, Dolanog

The chapel was built in 1903 by architect C. Dickens-Lewis of Shrewsbury. Ann Griffiths (1776-1805) was a Calvinistic Methodist, who wrote many notable hymns in Welsh which are still sung today. The chapel has a buttressed front with Arts and Crafts Gothic details on the bellcote and bowed porch. The adjoining house is slightly later, also of rock-faced masonry with ashlar detail, but tactfully neo-vernacular. The furnishings are Art Nouveau, the pulpit and big seat with balustrading. Hammer-beam roof on headed corbels of Ann Griffiths, David Davies, Rev. R Roberts, and Rev. John Hughes.

== Dolanog Bridge or Pont Dolanog ==
Dolanog Bridge is possibly the finest single early stone bridge in Montgomeryshire and may possibly date 17th century with the high camber of the roadway over the arch, which is similar to Llanrwst bridge. It was graphical depicted against a background of mountains in Edward Pugh's Cambrian Depicta. published in 1816. This view has now been lost by the building of recent bridge downstream of the old bridge. The bridge has a carriageway is about 3 metres wide. Rough masonry parapets with upright stone copings. The parapets are turned out at all four ends. Road macadamed and blocked by bollards at each end. It is listed by Cadw as Grade II

== Houses ==
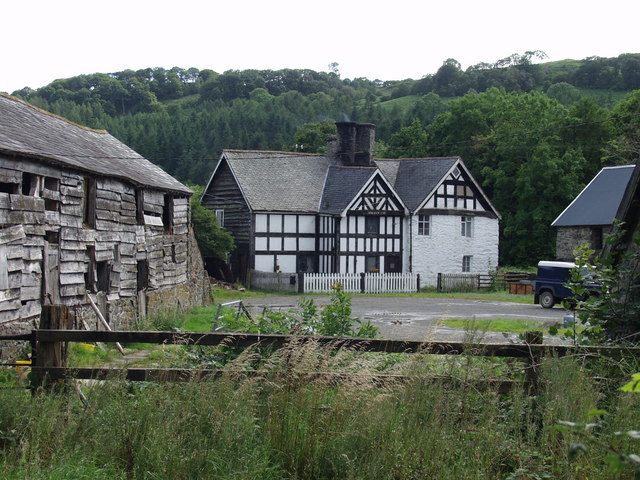
Stone and timbered house at Plas Dolanog

- Plas Dolanog, Timber-framed, with rebuilt in stone. T-plan with cross-wing and gabled porch in the front angle, dated 1664. Dressed stone chimneys set diagonally.
- Dolwar Fach. The home of Ann Griffiths, commemorated in the memorial chapel. The house has been rebuilt since her lifetime.
- Dolwar Hall A long, low, cruck-framed house, much under-built in stone, except for a thin band of black-and-white timber work. A central chimney with a stair beside it has been introduced between two of the couples. Probably built in the 15th. century.

== The hydro electric plant ==
Dolanog Estate installed a hydro electric plant on the Vyrnwy in 1921 when electricity was supplied to five houses, the church and the chapel. In April 2007 Derwent Hydro leased the plant. The site had been subject to reliability and operational problems for many years and was not profitable. Derwent Hydro modified the turbine arrangement and comprehensively upgraded the electrical control system at Dolanog including the installation of remote monitoring equipment. The plant now runs reliably, with a peak output over 140 kW.

== Pont Dolanog gallery ==
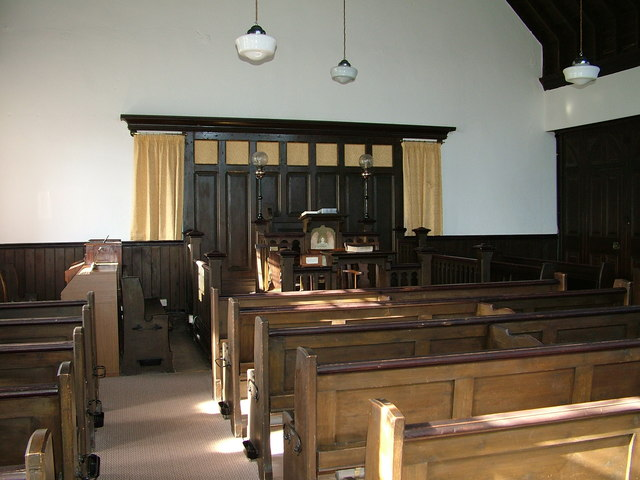
Ann Griffiths Memorial Chapel, Dolanog

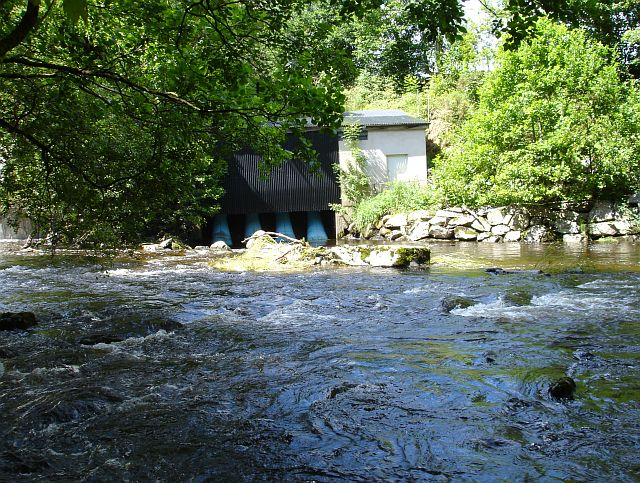
Hydroelectricity at Dolanog

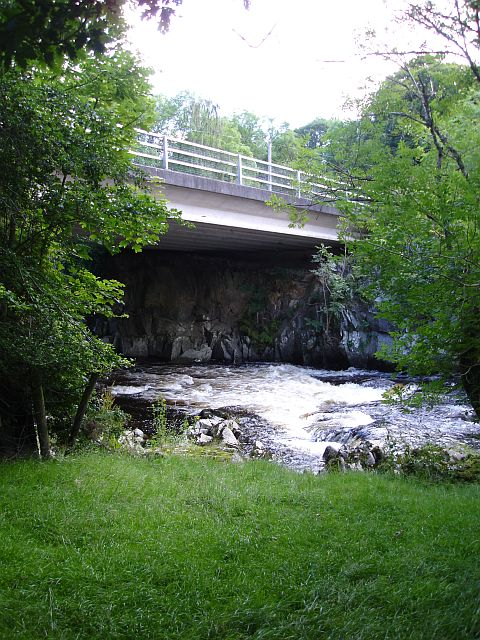
New bridge at Dolanog

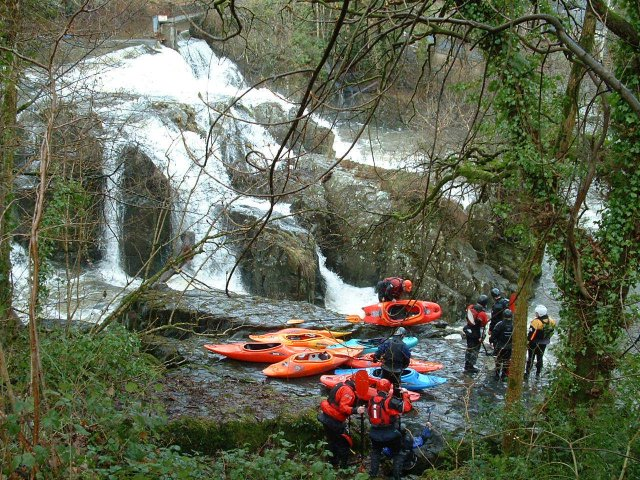
Dolanog Falls

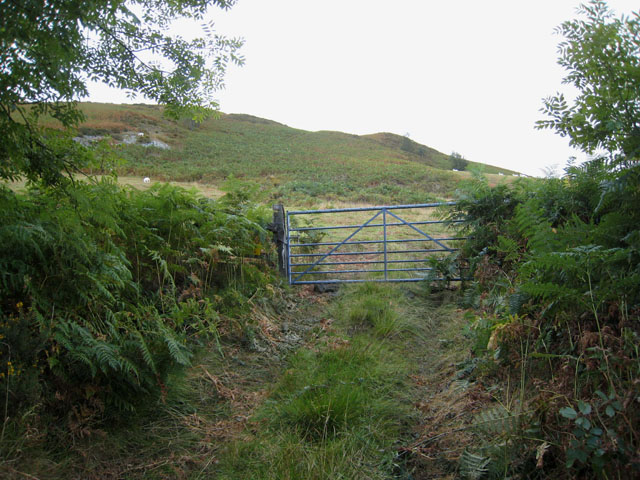
Allt Dolanog Hillfort

== Literature ==
- Scourfield R. and Haslam R. (2013), The Buildings of Wales: Powys; Montgomeryshire, Radnorshire and Breconshire, Yale University Press. pp 106–7.
- Thomas, D.R.(1908) History of the Diocese of Saint Asaph, Vol 1, 503–4.
