= Vyrnwy =

Vyrnwy may mean:

- Lake Vyrnwy (Llyn Efyrnwy), an artificial reservoir in Powys, Wales.
- River Vyrnwy (Afon Efyrnwy), the original river and main tributary feeding lake Vyrnwy.
