= Rhiwargor =

Hamlet in Powys, Wales

Coordinates: 52.806046°N 3.537777°W

Rhiwargor: Welsh: Rhiwargor
- Location within Powys
- Principal area: Powys
- Preserved county: Powys
- Country: Wales
- Sovereign state: United Kingdom
- Post town: Oswestry
- Postcode district: SY10
- Dialling code: 01691
- Police: Dyfed-Powys
- Fire: Mid and West Wales
- Ambulance: Welsh
- UK Parliament: Montgomeryshire and Glyndŵr
- Senedd Cymru – Welsh Parliament: Montgomeryshire

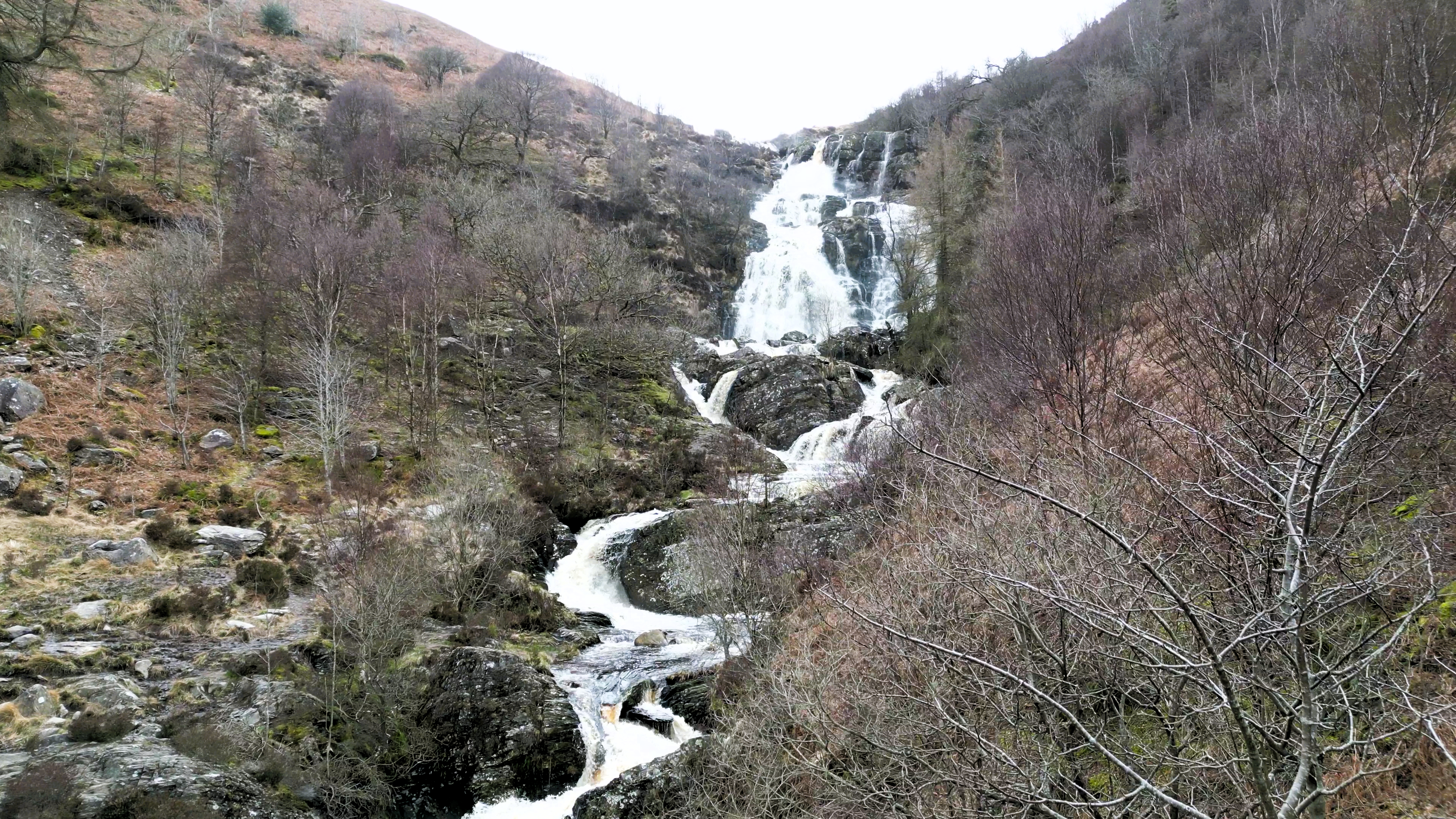
Rhiwargor Waterfall, Powys, Wales

Rhiwargor is a hamlet in Powys, Wales. It is located north of Lake Vyrnwy, near Rhiwagor Waterfall.

The hamlet is made up of a few houses with no amenities. The nearest church is St Wddyn Church which is near Vyrnwy Dam. The nearest shop is also near Lake Vyrnwy Dam. The bus stop is at Abertridwr.

== Climate ==
Climate data for Lake Vyrnwy No 2 (360m elevation) 1981–2010
| Month | Jan | Feb | Mar | Apr | May | Jun | Jul | Aug | Sep | Oct | Nov | Dec | Year |
|---|---|---|---|---|---|---|---|---|---|---|---|---|---|
| Mean daily maximum °C (°F) | 5.5 (41.9) | 5.5 (41.9) | 7.6 (45.7) | 10.2 (50.4) | 13.5 (56.3) | 16.0 (60.8) | 17.9 (64.2) | 17.5 (63.5) | 15.1 (59.2) | 11.5 (52.7) | 8.2 (46.8) | 5.9 (42.6) | 11.2 (52.2) |
| Mean daily minimum °C (°F) | 1.0 (33.8) | 0.6 (33.1) | 2.1 (35.8) | 3.3 (37.9) | 6.1 (43.0) | 8.7 (47.7) | 10.8 (51.4) | 10.7 (51.3) | 9.0 (48.2) | 6.4 (43.5) | 3.6 (38.5) | 1.4 (34.5) | 5.3 (41.5) |
| Average rainfall mm (inches) | 193.1 (7.60) | 143.3 (5.64) | 138.6 (5.46) | 96.4 (3.80) | 92.5 (3.64) | 90.6 (3.57) | 96.2 (3.79) | 94.2 (3.71) | 115.8 (4.56) | 199.9 (7.87) | 176.2 (6.94) | 198.6 (7.82) | 1,635.4 (64.39) |
| Average rainy days (≥ 1.0 mm) | 18.0 | 14.0 | 16.6 | 13.0 | 13.3 | 12.3 | 12.7 | 13.8 | 13.2 | 18.4 | 17.4 | 18.8 | 181.5 |
Source: metoffice.gov.uk
