= Lake Vyrnwy Straining Tower =

Grade I listed structure in Powys, Wales

Lake Vyrnwy Straining Tower and approach bridge
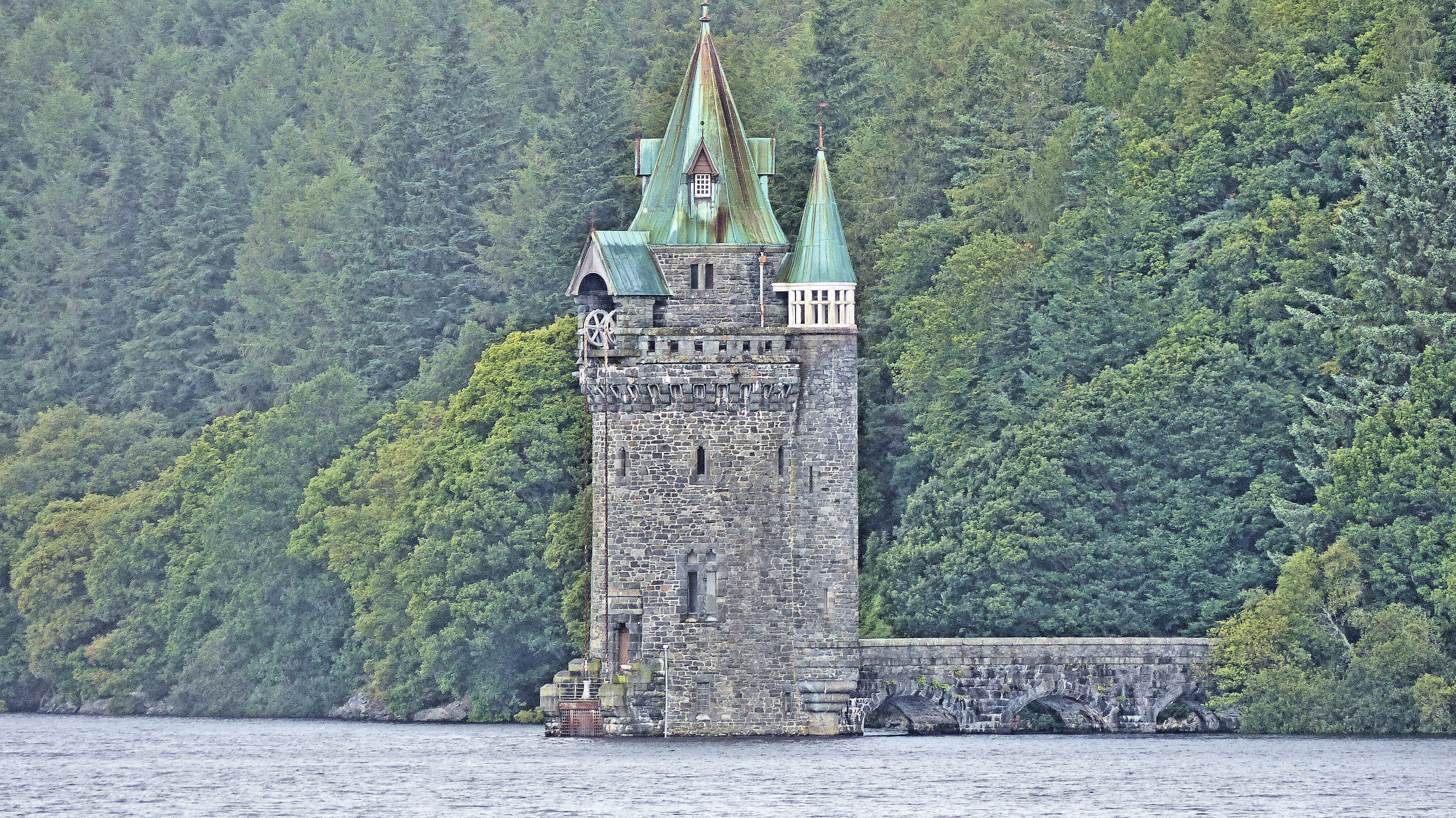

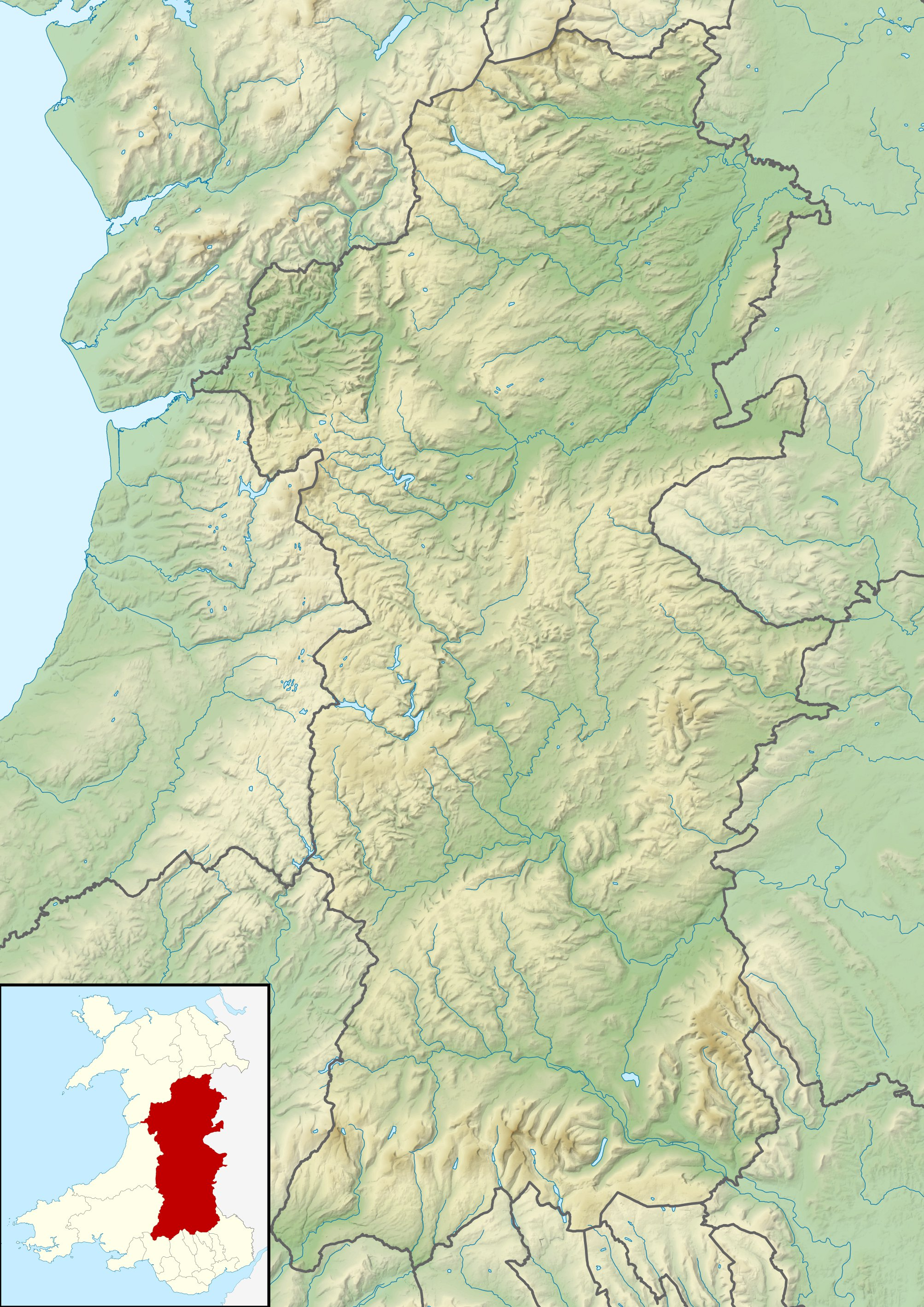
- Location within Powys
- 52.7699°N 3.4658°W
- Type: Intake tower
- Location: Lake Vyrnwy, Powys, Wales

History
- Built: 1881–1892

Site notes
- Architect: George Frederick Deacon
- Architectural style: Gothic Revival
- Owner: Severn Trent Water Authority

Listed Building – Grade I
- Official name: Lake Vyrnwy Straining Tower and approach bridge
- Designated: 25 November 1993
- Reference no.: 15622

Listed Building – Grade I
- Official name: Lake Vyrnwy Dam
- Designated: 25 November 1993
- Reference no.: 15621

Listed Building – Grade II
- Official name: Lake Vyrnwy Dam Memorials
- Designated: 26 February 2003
- Reference no.: 80917

Listed Building – Grade II
- Official name: Memorial Obelisk to Lake Vyrnwy Workers
- Designated: 26 February 2003
- Reference no.: 80919

The Straining Tower at Lake Vyrnwy is an intake tower built to extract water from the lake. The tower stands on the north shore of Lake Vyrnwy, near the village of Llanwddyn, in Powys, Wales. The Lake Vyrnwy dam project, designed to provide a water supply to Liverpool, began in 1881. On its completion 11 years later, the lake was the largest reservoir in Europe and water was drawn from it into the straining tower and carried to Liverpool on a 110-kilometre (68 mi)-long aqueduct. The engineers for the project were Thomas Hawksley and George Frederick Deacon, although the straining tower was entirely Deacon's design. The tower is constructed in a Gothic Revival style, influenced by Chillon Castle in Switzerland as well as the contemporaneous work of William Burges. The straining tower is a Grade I listed building.

== History ==
The Lake Vyrnwy dam project was part of a national endeavour to supply water for drinking and sanitation to the expanding Victorian cities of the Industrial Revolution. Construction of the dam, which involved the relocation of the village of Llanwddyn, began in 1881, the lake was filled by 1888, and the first supplies of water to Liverpool, 68 miles away, began in July 1892. During construction, 44 workmen died – 10 from workplace accidents – and are commemorated in a memorial at the lake. Another commemorative stone celebrates the official commencement of the reservoir's construction on 14 July 1881 by Edward Herbert, 3rd Earl of Powis. On its completion, the lake was the largest reservoir in Europe, and the aqueduct to Liverpool the longest in the world.

Water is extracted from the lake through the straining tower. Designed by George Frederick Deacon and completed in 1892, the tower extracts water from the lake by hydraulic pressure. It contains three filtration strainers which were used to cleanse the lake water before onward transportation. They have now been superseded by modern purification facilities located away from the lake.

== Architecture ==
The tower stands 52 metres (171 ft) high, and is constructed of concrete faced with snecked rubble. Deacon used the Gothic Revival style, and the Buildings of Wales series notes that he was "clearly influenced by William Burges". The circular tower is topped by an octagonal turret with a range of pyramidal roofs of copper. The straining tower is a Grade I listed building. The Cadw listing records the traditional suggestion that Deacon was influenced by Chillon Castle in his choice of style, but supports Pevsner in suggesting that contemporary (and relatively local) examples by Burges were the more likely sources. (Note: Burges himself certainly drew on Chillon Castle for his dramatic silhouette at Castell Coch, having seen the building during his stay in Switzerland while on a European tour in the early 1850s. In the same country, the Kapellbrücke in Lucerne provided the model for his Swiss Bridge at Cardiff Castle.)

== Sources ==
- Scourfield, Robert; Richard, Haslam (2013). Powys: Montgomeryshire, Radnorshire and Breconshire. The Buildings of Wales. New Haven, US and London: Yale University Press. ISBN 978-0-300-18508-9. OCLC 935421607.
