= Jane Hughes (poet) =

Welsh poet and hymnist

- Born: 25 June 1811; Pontrobert
- Died: 1878 (aged 66–67); Porthmadog

Jane Hughes (25 June 1811 - 26 April 1878) was a Welsh poet and hymnist. She wrote under the pen name Deborah Maldwyn.

Hughes was born in Pontrobert, Montgomeryshire on 25 June 1811 the third child to writer and Calvinist Methodist minister John Hughes and his wife, Ruth Evans, formerly a maid at Dolwar Fach, the home of Ann Griffiths, the hymn-writer. Jane Hughes was christened in her father's chapel, Capel Uchaf Pontrobert by a minister who had been ordained only the month before. Jane Hughes began writing in about 1846. Her parents died in the 1850s after which she began to travel around Wales. She followed Calvinistic Methodist meetings and sold her sheets of religious ballad to earn her living. Though she published a number of hymns they were not particularly successful. She became well known and had two collections of her works published in 1877. Hughes died in Porthmadog in 1878.

== Works ==
- Llyfr Hymnau (Carmarthen, 1846)
- Galargan am y diweddar Barch. Henry Rees, Liverpool (Carmarthen, 1869)
- Yr Epha lawn o ymborth ysprydol i bererinion Seion (Caernarvon, 1877)
- Telyn y Cristion (Caernarvon, 1877), Penillion ar enwau a swyddau Iesu Grist (Carmarthen, n.d.)
- Cwyn a chysur y Credadyn (Cowbridge, 1889)
