= Listed buildings in Melverley =

Melverley is a civil parish in Shropshire, England. It contains four listed buildings that are recorded in the National Heritage List for England. Of these, one is listed at Grade I, the highest of the three grades, and the others are at Grade II, the lowest grade. The parish contains the village of Melverley and is otherwise rural. The listed buildings consist of a church, a cottage, a farmhouse, and an agricultural building, all of which are timber framed, and which date from before the beginning of the 18th century.

== Key ==
Grade	Criteria
I	Buildings of exceptional interest, sometimes considered to be internationally important
II	Buildings of national importance and special interest

== Buildings ==
Name and location	Photograph	Date	Notes	Grade
St Peter's Church; 52.74258°N 2.99019°W		Late 15th century (probable)	The porch was added in the 16th century, and the bellcote in about 1718, and the church was restored in 1878, and again in 1924–25. It is timber framed with rendered infill on a plinth mainly of stone but of brick at the east end. The roof is tiled with ornamental cresting. The church consists of a nave and a chancel in one unit, and a south porch. On the west gable is a bellcote with a slate broach spire. The east window is mullioned, there is a mullioned and transomed window on the south side, and the other windows are small.	I
Hendre; 52.75174°N 3.00279°W	—	Early 17th century	The farmhouse has been extended. The original part is timber framed with brick infill, partly rendered, on a high brick plinth, the extension is in brick, and the roof is in corrugated iron. There is one storey and an attic, three bays, and a later brick lean-to at the rear. The windows are casements, and the porch is gabled.	II
The Old Shop; 52.75960°N 2.99792°W	—	Early 17th century	A cottage, at one time a shop, it has been extended and altered. It is timber framed with brick infill, it is rendered at the rear, and the roof is thatched. There is one storey and an attic, two bays, and a brick lean-to on the right. The windows, which are casements, and the doorway, have segmental heads.	II
Agricultural outbuilding 52.74230°N 2.99018°W	—	Late 17th century	The building is timber framed with brick infill, weatherboarding on the west gable end, and a corrugated iron roof. It contains a casement window and a stable door, and has a continuous loft.	II
