= Ann Griffiths =

Welsh poet & hymnist (1776–1805)

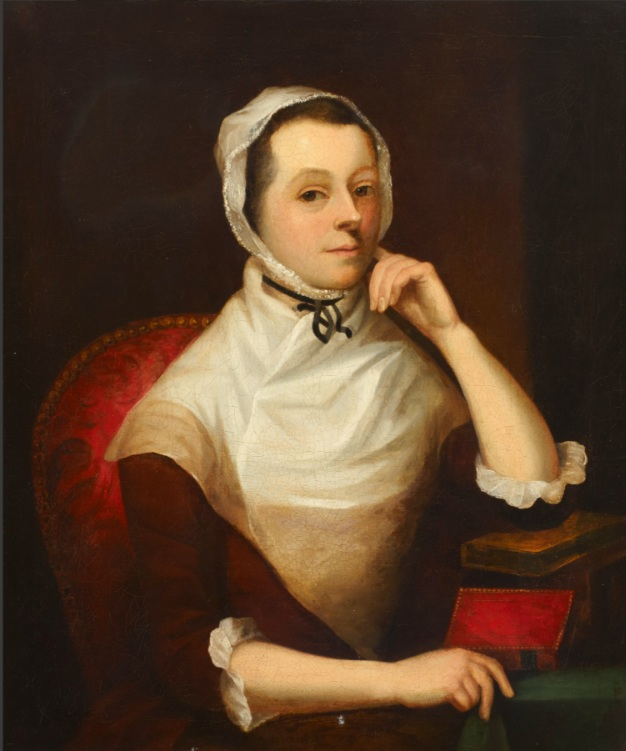
Portrait of a 'Mrs Griffiths', by anonymous artist. It has been erroneously claimed to be a portrait of Ann Griffiths the hymn-writer.

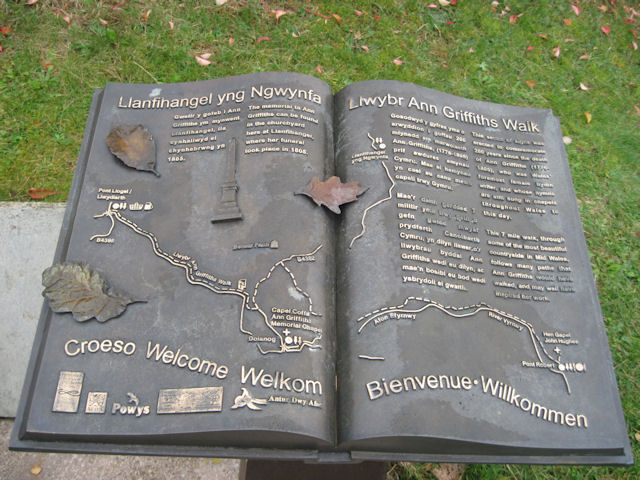
Remembered in Llanfihangel-yng-Ngwynfa

Ann Griffiths (née Thomas, 1776–1805) was a Welsh poet and writer of Methodist Christian hymns in the Welsh language. Her poetry reflects her fervent Christian faith and thorough scriptural knowledge.

== Biography ==
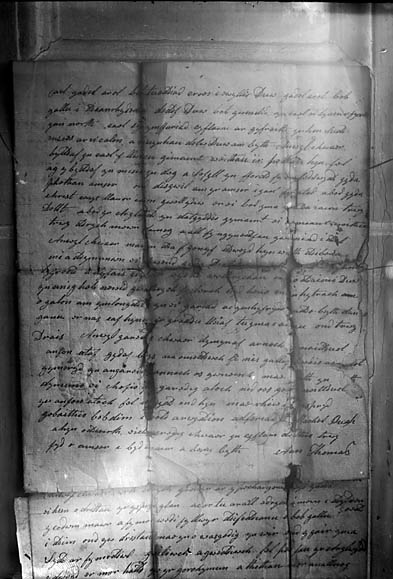
A letter in the hand of Ann Griffiths

Ann was born in April 1776 near the village of Llanfihangel-yng-Ngwynfa, six miles (10 km) from the market town of Llanfyllin in the former county of Montgomeryshire (now in Powys). She was the daughter of John Evan Thomas, a tenant farmer and churchwarden, and his wife, Jane. She had two older sisters, an older brother, John, and a younger brother, Edward. Her parents' house, Dolwar Fechan, was an isolated farmhouse some two and a half miles (4 km) south of Llanfihangel and one mile (1.6 km) north of Dolanog, set among hills and streams.

Ann was brought up in the Anglican church. In 1794, her mother died when she was 18, and about that time or perhaps earlier she followed her brothers John and Edward in being drawn to the Methodists. In 1796 she joined the Calvinistic Methodist movement after hearing the preaching of Benjamin Jones of Pwllheli.

After the deaths of both her parents, she married Thomas Griffiths, a farmer from the parish of Meifod and an elder of the Calvinistic Methodist church. However, she died after childbirth in August 1805, at the age of 29, and was buried on 12 August 1805 at St Michael's church in Llanfihangel-yng-Ngwynfa.

Ann Griffiths left a handful of stanzas in the Welsh language. These were preserved and published by her mentor, the Calvinistic Methodist minister, John Hughes of Pontrobert, and his wife, Ruth, who had been a maid at Ann Griffiths' farm and was a close confidante.

== Poetry ==
Ann's poems express her fervent Christian faith and reflect her incisive intellect and thorough scriptural knowledge. She is the most prominent female hymnist in Welsh. Her work is regarded as a highlight of Welsh literature, and her longest poem Rhyfedd, rhyfedd gan angylion... (Wondrous, wondrous to angels...) was described by the dramatist and literary critic Saunders Lewis as "one of the majestic songs in the religious poetry of Europe".

Her hymn Wele'n sefyll rhwng y myrtwydd (Behold, standing between the myrtle trees) is commonly sung in Wales to the tune Cwm Rhondda.

The service of enthronement of Rowan Williams as Archbishop of Canterbury in February 2003 included Williams' own translation of one of her hymns, Yr Arglwydd Iesu (The Lord Jesus).

== Legacy ==
Together with Mary Jones (1784–1864), a poor Welsh girl who walked to Bala to buy a Bible, Ann Griffiths became a national icon by the end of the 19th century, and was a significant figure in Welsh nonconformism.

The Ann Griffiths Memorial Chapel in Dolanog, Powys, is named after her and has a carved corbel head based on contemporary descriptions of her. There are stained glass windows in her memory in Eglwys y Crwys Welsh Presbyterian Church, Cathays, Cardiff, in the Williams Pantycelyn Memorial Chapel in Llandovery, and in the Ceiriog Memorial Institute in Glyn Ceiriog.

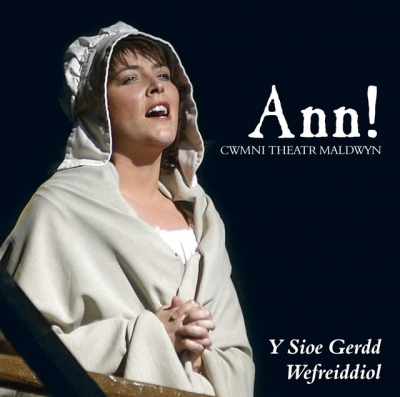
Album cover of the musical Ann!

The television channel S4C commissioned Ann!, a musical based on Ann Griffiths' life, to be performed at the 2003 National Eisteddfod at Meifod. This was later televised and released on CD.

In 2024, plans to sell the church where she is buried, in part because of lack of money for its upkeep, were postponed after public opposition.
