= Pentre Camp =

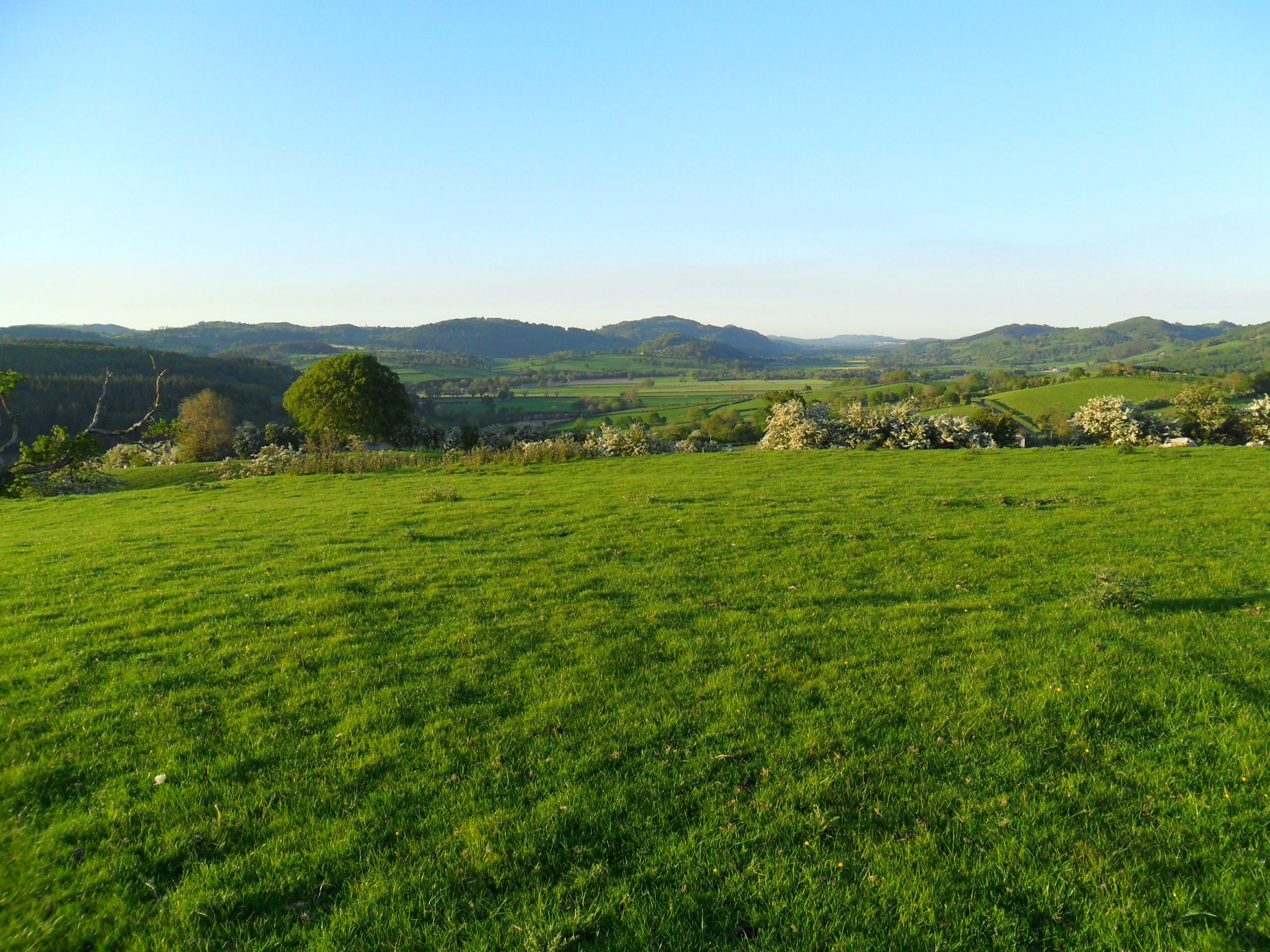
- View from the fort, looking north-east

- Location within Powys
- 52°40′36″N 3°18′24″W
- Type: Hillfort
- Periods: Iron Age
- Location: Near Llangynyw, Wales
- OS grid reference: SJ 117 096

Site notes
- Length: 74 metres (243 ft)
- Width: 48 metres (157 ft)
- Area: 0.8 acres (0.32 ha)

Pentre Camp is an Iron Age hillfort, near the hamlet of Llangynyw and about 2.5 miles (4 km) north-east of Llanfair Caereinion, in Powys, Wales. It is a scheduled monument.

== Description ==
The fort is an oval, about 74 metres (243 ft) by 48 metres (157 ft), enclosing an area of 0.8 acres (0.32 ha). There are several concentric ramparts: three in the north and west and five elsewhere. There are traces of further ramparts in the south and west.

In the east the third and fourth ramparts are linked to form an entrance passage. All the banks are low, and may have originally been low, as foundations for timber defences.

There is a spring (still issuing water) a short distance away, at the base of the northern slope of the fort; this was probably of practical importance in the fort's location.

There is speculation that the field boundary wall crossing the northern rampart may be part of the original revetment.

== See also ==
- Hillforts in Britain
- List of Scheduled prehistoric Monuments in Powys (Montgomeryshire)
