= Abertridwr, Powys =

Coordinates: 52.759979°N 3.43182°W

Abertridwr
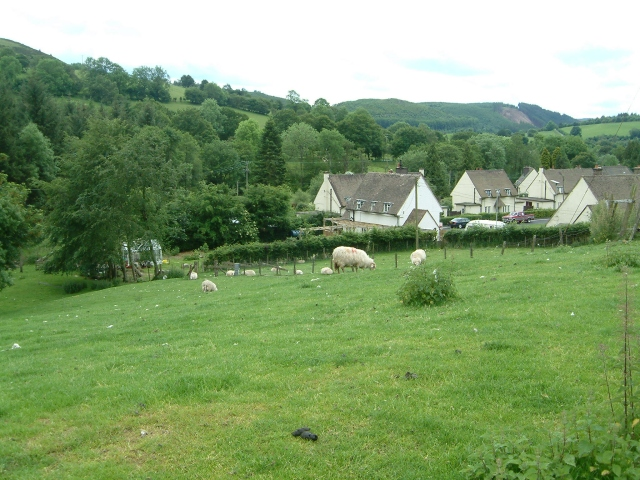
- Outskirts

- Location within Powys
- OS grid reference: SJ 03474 19003
  - Cardiff: 89 mi (143 km)
  - London: 165 mi (266 km)
- Community: Llanwddyn
- Principal area: Powys
- Country: Wales
- Sovereign state: United Kingdom
- Post town: OSWESTRY
- Postcode district: SY10
- Police: Dyfed-Powys
- Fire: Mid and West Wales
- Ambulance: Welsh
- UK Parliament: Montgomeryshire and Glyndŵr
- Senedd Cymru – Welsh Parliament: Montgomeryshire

Abertridwr (Welsh pronunciation) is a small village in the historic county of Montgomeryshire in the north of Powys and close to Lake Vyrnwy in the community (civil parish) of Llanwddyn.

It lies at the confluence of Nant Tridwr (hence the name) with the Vyrnwy river about 1 mile from the latter's exit from the lake.

The area surrounding Abertridwr has forests and is used for outdoor pursuits.

The nearest significant settlement is Welshpool, about 25 km or 15 miles to the south east.
