= 1907 Aberdeen Corporation election =

Election

← 1906	November 5, 1907	1908 →

11 out of 34 seats of City of Aberdeen Council 17 seats needed for a majority
	First party	Second party
Party	Independent	Labour Repr. Cmte.
Seats won	11	0
Seats after	34	0
Seat change	0	0
Popular vote	2,242	341
Percentage	86.8%	13.2%
- Composition of Corporation after the election

An election to the Aberdeen Corporation was held on 5 November 1907, alongside municipal elections across Scotland. 11 of the corporation's 34 seats were up for election, although only 2 were contested.

This election saw the first municipal contests in Aberdeen with a candidate supported by the Aberdeen Labour Representation Committee (LRC). While unaffiliated with the national body that had formed in 1900, this local group was modeled and named the same. The LRC consisted of the Aberdeen United Trades Council, the local branches of the Social Democratic Federation and the Independent Labour Party, and the Working Women's Political Association, a local women's suffrage group which later folded into a branch of the Women's Social and Political Union. The group was originally formed to contest the 1907 Aberdeen South by-election.

== Ward results ==
Rosemount
Party	Candidate	Votes	%
Independent	John Newton (incumbent)	492	59.1
Labour Repr. Cmte.	John Croll	341	40.9
Majority		151	
Turnout			
Independent hold			

St. Clement
Party	Candidate	Votes	%
Independent	Charles G. Esson	943	53.9
Independent	Alexander Thomson	807	46.1
Majority		136	
Turnout			
Independent hold			
