= Llangynyw =

- Location within Powys
- Population: 582 (2011)
- OS grid reference: SJ125085
- Principal area: Powys
- Preserved county: Powys
- Country: Wales
- Sovereign state: United Kingdom
- Post town: WELSHPOOL
- Postcode district: SY21
- Post town: MEIFOD
- Postcode district: SY22
- Dialling code: 01938
- Police: Dyfed-Powys
- Fire: Mid and West Wales
- Ambulance: Welsh
- UK Parliament: Montgomeryshire and Glyndŵr
- List of places UK Wales Powys 52.67251°N 3.3171°W Community map: Map of the community

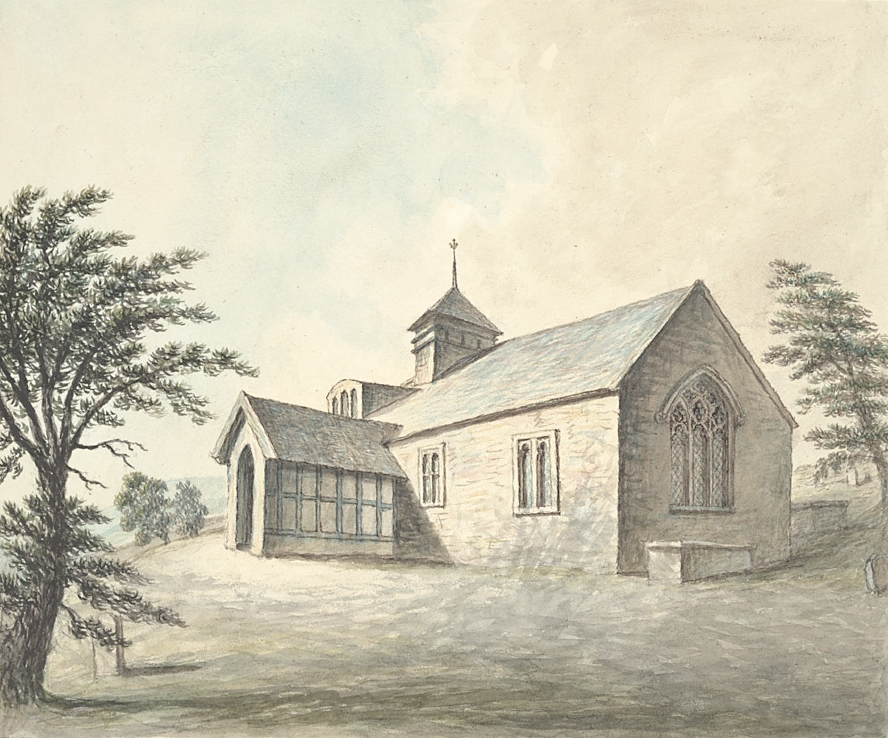
Llangyniw church, 1794

Llangynyw (also Llangyniew) is a hamlet and community in Montgomeryshire, Powys, mid Wales. It is located on a hill inside a bend in the River Banwy, approximately two miles north-east of Llanfair Caereinion. The community includes the hamlet of Pontrobert.

The focus of the hamlet is the Parish Church of St. Cynyw, which dates from between 1450 and 1500 and is a Grade II* listed building.

The parish of Llangynyw had a population of 551 when the 1801 census was taken, 430 in 1901, and 295 in 1971, increasing back to 582 at the 2011 census.

Pentre Camp, an Iron Age hillfort, is near the hamlet.
