= 1909 Aberdeen Corporation election =

Local Election in Aberdeen, Scotland

- November 2, 1909

11 out of 34 seats of City of Aberdeen Council 17 seats needed for a majority
| | First party | Second party |
|---|---|---|
| Party | Independent | Labour |
| Seats won | 10 | 1 |
| Seats after | 32 | 1 |
| Seat change | 1 ▼ | 1 ▲ |
| Popular vote | 3,263 | 806 |
| Percentage | 80.2% | 19.8% |

An election to the Aberdeen Corporation was held on 2 November 1909, alongside municipal elections across Scotland. 11 of the corporation's 34 seats were up for election, although only 3 were contested.

This election continued the 'Water Question,' debating whether the town's drinking water supply should be pulled from the River Dee or the River Avon. On 15 September 1909, the corporation had voted 19 to 13 to approve pursuing a local act in order to fund the Avon water scheme. Despite this, many considered the matter still open, and John G. Scott of Woodside stood specifically for this matter, winning against a councillor that supported the Avon in September. In Greyfriars, Councillor Alexander Duncan voted for the Dee previously and won by a large margin. In St. Andrew's both candidates effectively supported the Dee, Chalmers stating he was no longer convinced of the Avon scheme, a change from last election. Although James George of Torry was labeled as a socialist in local papers, he was not backed by the local Labour Party, but was rather just a member of a trade union.

== Ward results ==
Greyfriars
| Party | Candidate | Votes | % |
|---|---|---|---|
| Independent | Alexander R. Duncan (incumbent) | 887 | 87.3 |
| Independent | John T. Low | 129 | 12.7 |
| Majority | | 758 | |
| Turnout | | 1,025 | 38.3 |
| Independent hold | | | |

St. Andrews
| Party | Candidate | Votes | % |
|---|---|---|---|
| Labour | William K. Chalmers | 806 | 57.6 |
| Independent | William L. Dunn (incumbent) | 593 | 42.4 |
| Majority | | 213 | |
| Turnout | | 1,414 | 42.0 |
| Labour gain from Independent | | | |

Torry
| Party | Candidate | Votes | % |
|---|---|---|---|
| Independent | James George (Note: Noted as a socialist but was not supported by the Labour Party.) | Unopposed | |
| Majority | | | |
| Turnout | | | |
| Independent gain from Independent | | | |

Woodside
| Party | Candidate | Votes | % |
|---|---|---|---|
| Independent | John G. Scott | 562 | 54.8 |
| Independent | John Adan (incumbent) | 463 | 45.2 |
| Majority | | 463 | |
| Turnout | | 1027 | 57.1 |
| Independent gain from Independent | | | |
