= Pontrobert =

Parish in the county of Powys, Wales

Coordinates: 52.705°N 3.321°W

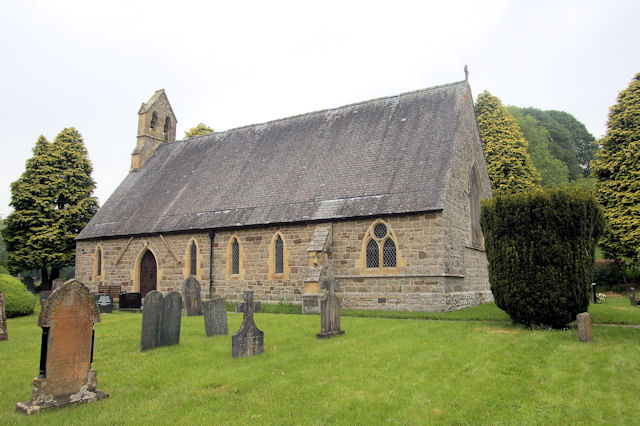
- St John The Evangelist church, Pontrobert

- Location within Powys
- OS grid reference: SJ 1012
- Principal area: Powys
- Country: Wales
- Sovereign state: United Kingdom
- Post town: Meifod
- Postcode district: SY22
- Police: Dyfed-Powys
- Fire: Mid and West Wales
- Ambulance: Welsh
- UK Parliament: Montgomeryshire and Glyndŵr

Pontrobert is an ecclesiastical parish that was formed in September 1854. It comprises the townships of Teirtref and part of Nantymeichiaid in the parish Meifod, a portion of Cynhinfa which was in the parish of Llangynyw and portions of the townships of Fachwel, Llaethbwlch and Cadwnfa which were in the parish of Llanfihangel. The total area of this parish is 5,000 acres. As a result of this arrangement, Pont Robert is now divided between the present day Community Councils of Meifod, Llangynyw and Mawddwy. Pontrobert was within the historic county of Montgomeryshire, now forming part of Powys. The name Pontrobert is derived from Robert ap Oliver of Cyhinfa, who built the original bridge over the River Vyrnwy around 1700. An alternative Welsh name for Pontrobert is Pont y ddolfeiniog.

== The Church of St. John the Evangelist ==
The church was built in 1853 following the formation of the new parish to designs by Richard Kyrke Penson. The church is in the Deanery of Ceirienion, the Archdeaconery of Montgomery and the Diocese of St Asaph. The church has well proportioned gable ends and slates meeting the walls without a coping. Simple Early English style with a west bellcote, and interior without structural division. The roof has arched braces resting on low imposts.

== Chapels ==
- Hen Gapel John Hughes. Chapel with large casement windows in the centre incorporating two-bay cottage sharing the same roofline. Built in 1800 and restored 1995, after long usage as a workshop. The Rev. John Hughes was a celebrated hymn-writer and Calvinistic Methodist minister here from 1814 until his death in 1854. His daughter was Welsh poet Jane Hughes. His pulpit of 1835, panelled with convex reeded corners, has been preserved. A local campaign to restore the chapel and cottage commenced in 1984, and eleven years later the work of restoration was completed and the chapel re-opened as a non-denominational Centre for Christian Unity and Renewal. The cottage is occupied by the Custodian. The chapel has been listed as Grade II* by CADW.
- Capel Cerrig. Former Calvinistic Methodist chapel built to replace the old chapel in 1875. Simple stone gabled front; round arched windows. By the Liverpool architect Richard Owens.
- Presbyterian Chapel . Built in 1871 with Polychromatic brickwork. Gothic window each side of the porch and a small rose window above. Probably also to the designs of Richard Owens.
- Sion Independent Chapel. Built in 1891 and also with Polychromatic brickwork.

== The Quaker Meeting House at Dolobran ==
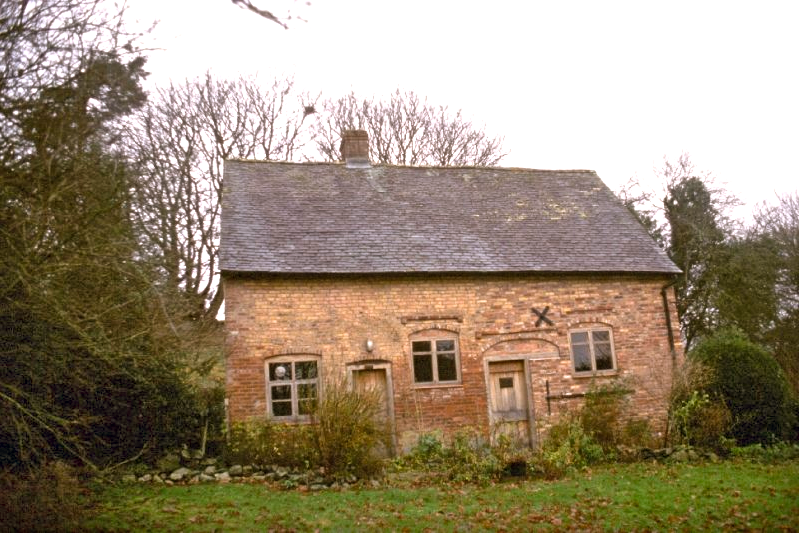
Dolobran Quaker Meeting House

Dolobran Quaker Meeting House. A tiny isolated chapel with a two-bay cottage under the same roof, but very close to the Glyndŵr's Way long-distance footpath. Built 1701 for Charles Lloyd of Dolobran. The building which is an early example of brick building in Montgomeryshire, is listed Grade ii*. Constructed of red-brick with drip courses over the cambered windows. Among the members of the Quaker meeting were the Lloyd family of Dolobran. Meetings ceased in 1828 and the building restored by the Quakers c.1970.

== Bridges ==
- Pontrobert Bridge which give the parish its name, was built by Thomas Penson, the Montgomeryshire county surveyor in 1838. It is of stone and the Vyrnwy flows through the two arches.
- Pont-y-Ffatri c.1830. Two segmental arches, each of 12 metres span. Keystones withstring-course above.

== Dolobran Forge ==
The site of this charcoal forge, built in 1719, is beside the Vyrnwy. It was built by Charles Lloyd who closed the forge when he became bankrupt in 1727, but it was re-opened by his son. It was converted into a woollen or flannel factory in 1789. There are the ruins of a house and cottage on the site.

== Houses ==
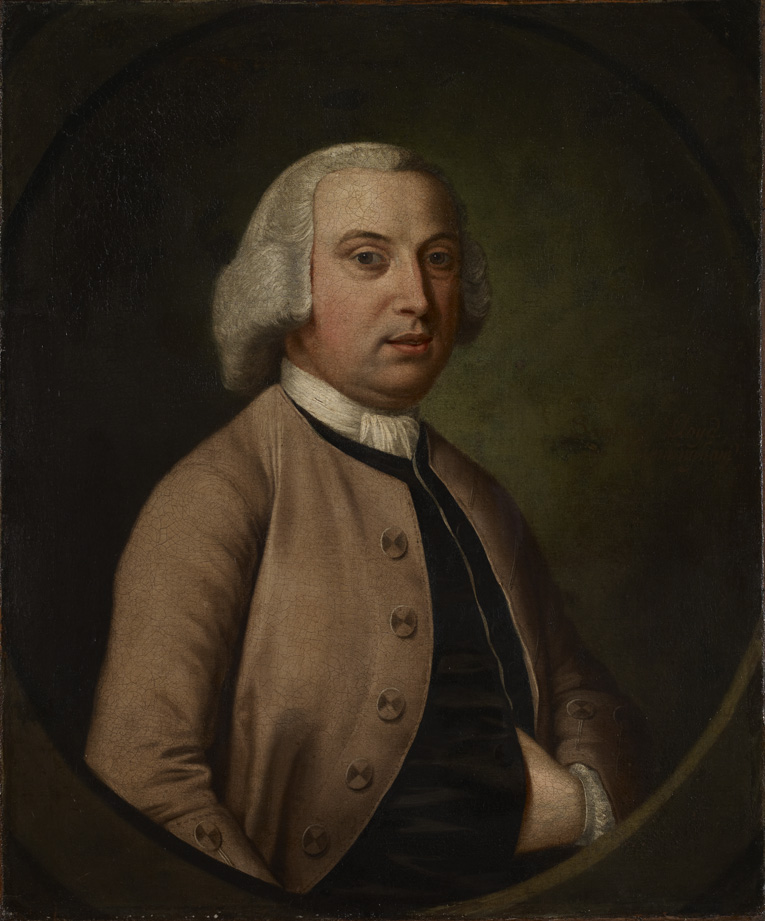
Portrait of Sampson Lloyd II (1699 - 1779), a founder of Lloyds Bank

Pontrobert contains a notable group of early houses including Dolobran, the family home of the Quaker Lloyd family, which included Sampson Lloyd II, the joint founder of Lloyds Bank. The Lloyds of Dolobran became Quakers in the 17th century. They were pioneers in the iron industry with the Mathrafal charcoal forge and built the Dolobran forge, and were also concerned in setting up the coke furnace at Bersham, Wrexham, in 1719. It was because of this that they went bankrupt in 1728.

- Dolobran. A fragment of the house which was from 1486 to 1780 the home of the Lloyds, The three-bay brick house retains a small wing with William and Mary panelling downstairs, and a sizeable external brick chimney to the rear with shaped late 17th century supports. This joins onto a block built onto the house around 1830. Dolobran had been sold to a Joseph Jones in the later 18th century. It was bought back in 1873 when Henry Lloyd purchased a portion of the old estate (Dolobran Fach). In 1878 Sampson Samuel Lloyd MP (1820-1899) bought back the other part of the estate. Samuel Llewellyn Lloyd (b. 1907) was still at Dolobran in 1969.
- Neuadd Cynhinfa. Constructed of post-and-panel Close studding. The only other example of this type of construction in Montgomeryshire, with wooden panels between the posts instead of Wattle and daub infill is Trelystan church. This was a house of high status, the building date of 1507 provided by dendrochronology or tree-ring dating. Much has been rebuilt in stone, probably when the floors and chimney was inserted c.1630. Some of the original construction has been restored, and the addition of the 17th century parlour wing against the hall has preserved the former exterior wall intact as a partition. The hall and inner rooms are divided by a fine post-and-panel partition. The inner rooms had ceilings from the start. The house has substantial roof trusses, the hall truss with chamfered and curved braces to the collar, and cusped decoration above.
- Cynhinfa. A CruckTimber-framed hall-house. In the 17th century a large timber-framed cross-wing was added and floors inserted. The older three-bay range has been rebuilt in stone, but retains a good post-and-panel partition.
- Garth Fawr This is a cruck-timber framed farmhouse probably of 16th century date. It is Grade II* listed by Cadw. It was part of the Dolobran Estate until it was sold in 1982. The house was given an upper storey and with axial chimney presumably in the late 16th or early 17th century, converting it into a lobby entrance type house of Severn Valley type. An extra bay was added to the NW and part may have been a granary.

== Literature ==
- Griffiths W A., (1957), Some Notes about Pontrobert, near Meifod, Montgomeryshire Collections, Vol. 55 Pt1, pp. 3–9. (This is largely about the Oliver family of Cynhinfa).
- Lloyd, H, (1968), The iron forges of the Vyrnwy valley, The Montgomeryshire Collections : 60 : 104-10
- King, P W, (1996), Early Statistics for the Iron Industry: a vindication, Journal of the Historic Metallurgy Society : 30.1 : 23-46
- Scourfield R. and Haslam R. (2013), The Buildings of Wales: Powys; Montgomeryshire, Radnorshire and Breconshire, Yale University Press. pp 239–41.
- Thomas, D.R.(1908) History of the Diocese of Saint Asaph, Vol 1, 504–5.

=== Lloyd Family History ===
- Anna Lloyd (Braithwaite) Thomas (1924). The Quaker seekers of Wales: A story of the Lloyds of Dolobran.
- Lloyd H (1975, 2006 Reprint), Quaker Lloyds in the Industrial Revolution, 1660-1860, Routledge. ISBN 0415381614
- Lewys Dunn (1846), Heraldic Visitations of Wales and Part of the Marches, Vol 1, pg. 294.
- Lowe R .J., (1883) Farm and its Inhabitants with some account of the Lloyds of Dolobran, London. (Farm is a house in Sparkbrook, Birmingham).
- Rees T. M.(1925), A history of the Quakers in Wales and their emigration to North America
