= Lake Vyrnwy =

Man-made lake in Wales

- Welsh: Llyn Efyrnwy
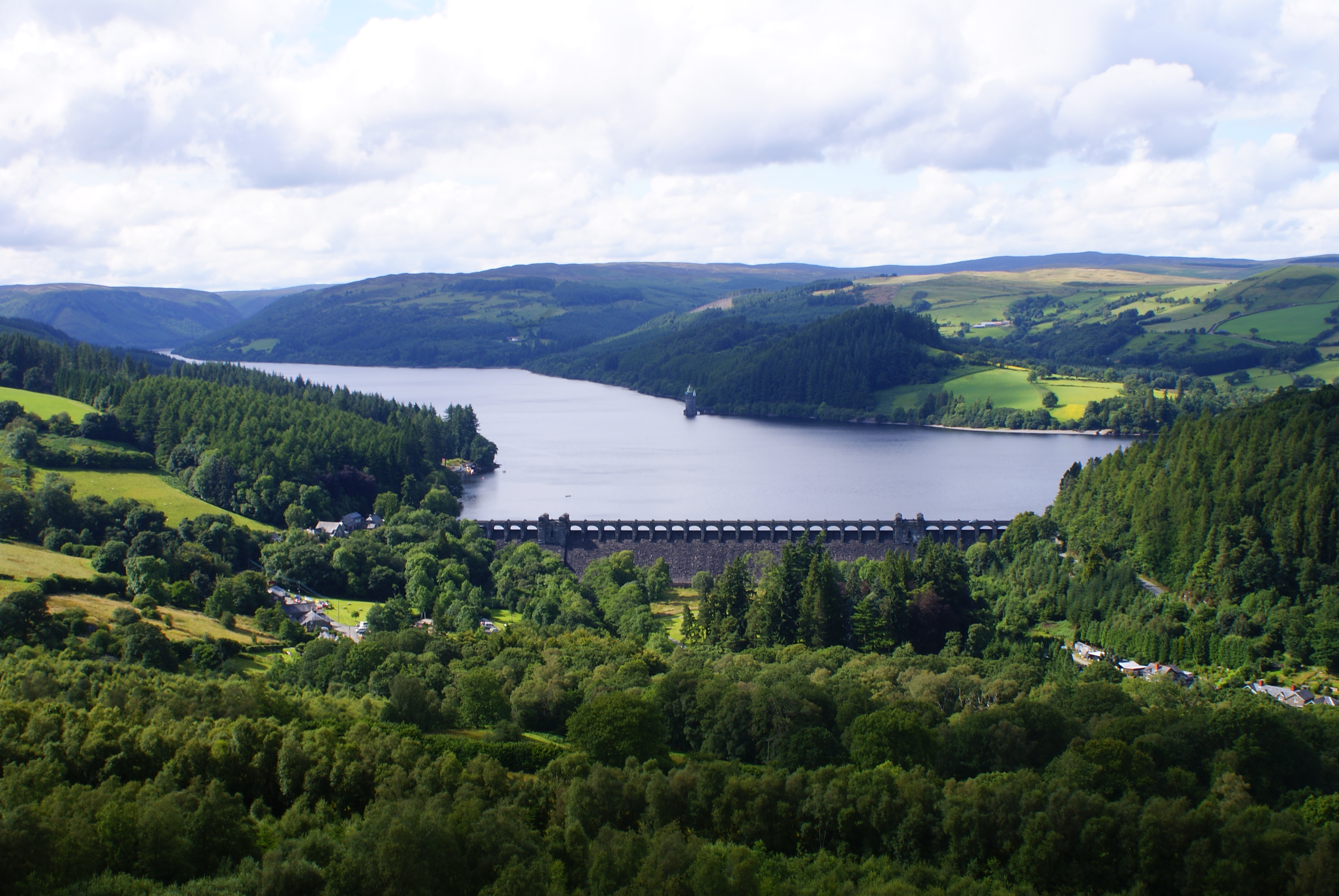
- View overlooking Lake Vyrnwy showing the full extent of the lake

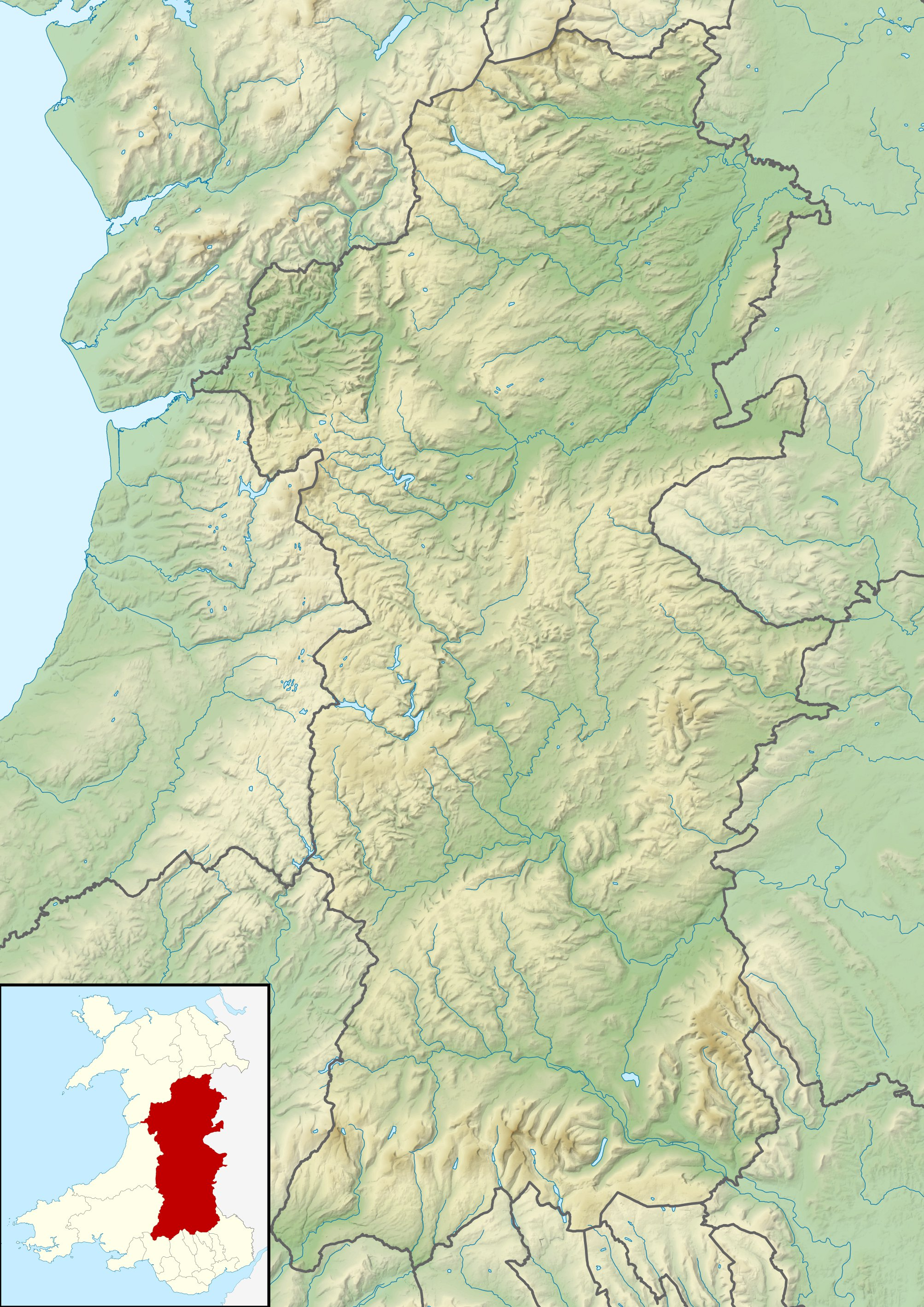
- Location within Powys
- Location: Wales
- Coordinates: 52.78°N 3.50°W
- Lake type: Reservoir
- Primary inflows: River Vyrnwy and other small streams
- Primary outflows: River Vyrnwy
- Managing agency: Hafren Dyfrdwy subsidiary of Severn Trent
- Built: 1881–88
- Max. length: 7.64 kilometres (4.75 mi)
- Max. width: 0.80 kilometres (0.5 mi)
- Surface area: 4.54 square kilometres (1,121 acres)
- Max. depth: 26 metres (84 ft)
- Water volume: 59.7 gigalitres (13.125×10^{9} imp gal)
- Shore length^{1}: 19 kilometres (12 mi)
- ^{1} Shore length is not a well-defined measure.

Lake Vyrnwy (Welsh: Llyn Efyrnwy, pronounced [ɛˈvərnʊɨ] or Llyn Llanwddyn) is a reservoir in Powys, Wales, built in the 1880s for Liverpool Corporation Waterworks to supply Liverpool with fresh water. It flooded the head of the Vyrnwy (Welsh: Afon Efyrnwy) valley and submerged the village of Llanwddyn.

The Lake Vyrnwy Nature Reserve and Estate that surrounds the lake is jointly managed by the Royal Society for the Protection of Birds (RSPB) and Hafren Dyfrdwy and is a popular destination for ornithologists, cyclists and hikers. The reserve is designated as a national nature reserve, a Site of Special Scientific Interest, a Special Protection Area, and a Special Area of Conservation.

== Geography ==
Lake Vyrnwy is a reservoir in Powys, Wales, created in 1888 by flooding the head of the River Vyrnwy (Welsh: Afon Efyrnwy) valley. The river flows from the dam into Shropshire where it converges with the River Severn near the village of Melverley on the Welsh border and outflows into the Bristol Channel.

When the reservoir is full, it is 26 metres (84 ft) deep, contains 59.7 gigalitres (13.125×10^{9} imp gal), and covers an area of 4.54 square kilometres (1,121 acres), the equivalent of around 600 football pitches. The lake has a perimeter of 19 kilometres (12 mi) with a road that goes all the way around it. Its length is 7.64 kilometres (4.75 mi).

The main watercourses flowing into the reservoir, clockwise from the west side of the dam, are the Afon Hirddu, Eunant, Afon Eiddew, Afon Naedroedd, Afon Cedig and Afon Y Dolau Gwynionew.

On the northern edge of the lake is a small hamlet called Rhiwargor where the rivers Afon Eiddew and Afon Naedroedd meet. Up the valley of Afon Eiddew is the waterfall of Pistyll Rhyd-y-meincau.

=== Climate ===
Climate data for Lake Vyrnwy (1991-2020 normals, extremes 1959-present)
Month	Jan	Feb	Mar	Apr	May	Jun	Jul	Aug	Sep	Oct	Nov	Dec	Year
Record high °C (°F)	14.1 (57.4)	16.4 (61.5)	20.6 (69.1)	21.9 (71.4)	28.2 (82.8)	29.6 (85.3)	33.0 (91.4)	31.6 (88.9)	27.2 (81.0)	24.3 (75.7)	17.3 (63.1)	13.7 (56.7)	33.0 (91.4)
Mean daily maximum °C (°F)	5.7 (42.3)	6.0 (42.8)	7.9 (46.2)	10.7 (51.3)	13.7 (56.7)	16.3 (61.3)	18.0 (64.4)	17.5 (63.5)	15.3 (59.5)	11.7 (53.1)	8.4 (47.1)	6.3 (43.3)	11.5 (52.7)
Daily mean °C (°F)	3.4 (38.1)	3.5 (38.3)	5.0 (41.0)	7.1 (44.8)	10.0 (50.0)	12.7 (54.9)	14.4 (57.9)	14.2 (57.6)	12.2 (54.0)	9.1 (48.4)	6.1 (43.0)	4.0 (39.2)	8.5 (47.3)
Mean daily minimum °C (°F)	1.2 (34.2)	1.0 (33.8)	2.0 (35.6)	3.6 (38.5)	6.2 (43.2)	9.0 (48.2)	10.9 (51.6)	10.9 (51.6)	9.1 (48.4)	6.6 (43.9)	3.8 (38.8)	1.7 (35.1)	5.5 (41.9)
Record low °C (°F)	−13.3 (8.1)	−13.3 (8.1)	−8.6 (16.5)	−6.0 (21.2)	−2.9 (26.8)	0.0 (32.0)	2.8 (37.0)	2.8 (37.0)	0.0 (32.0)	−3.3 (26.1)	−7.1 (19.2)	−11.5 (11.3)	−13.3 (8.1)
Average precipitation mm (inches)	190.1 (7.48)	162.5 (6.40)	127.0 (5.00)	96.8 (3.81)	99.9 (3.93)	98.6 (3.88)	98.7 (3.89)	110.4 (4.35)	121.2 (4.77)	179.9 (7.08)	179.4 (7.06)	214.5 (8.44)	1,679 (66.10)
Average precipitation days (≥ 1.0 mm)	18.3	14.9	15.2	13.3	13.4	12.6	13.6	14.7	14.1	17.5	18.8	19.1	185.3
Mean monthly sunshine hours	42.7	62.5	104.6	145.5	177.5	163.7	168.4	151.1	118.9	83.7	51.4	38.3	1,308.4
Source 1: Met Office
Source 2: Starlings Roost Weather

== Construction ==
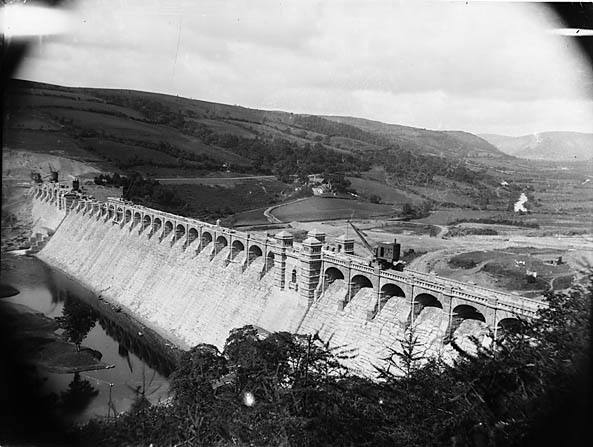
The dam under construction, c. 1885

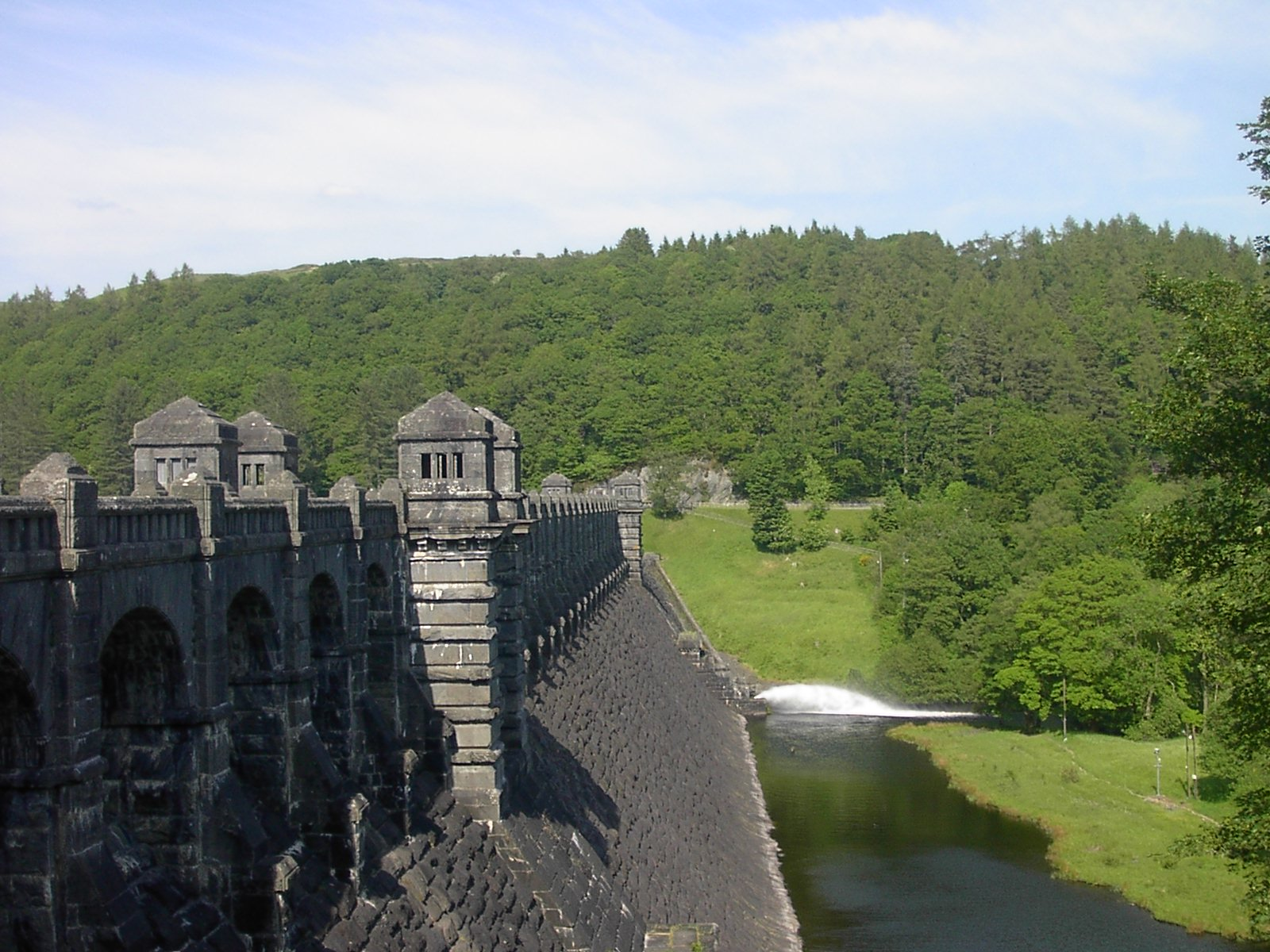
The dam looking east, showing compensation water being released from the reservoir

Water flowing over the crest of the dam

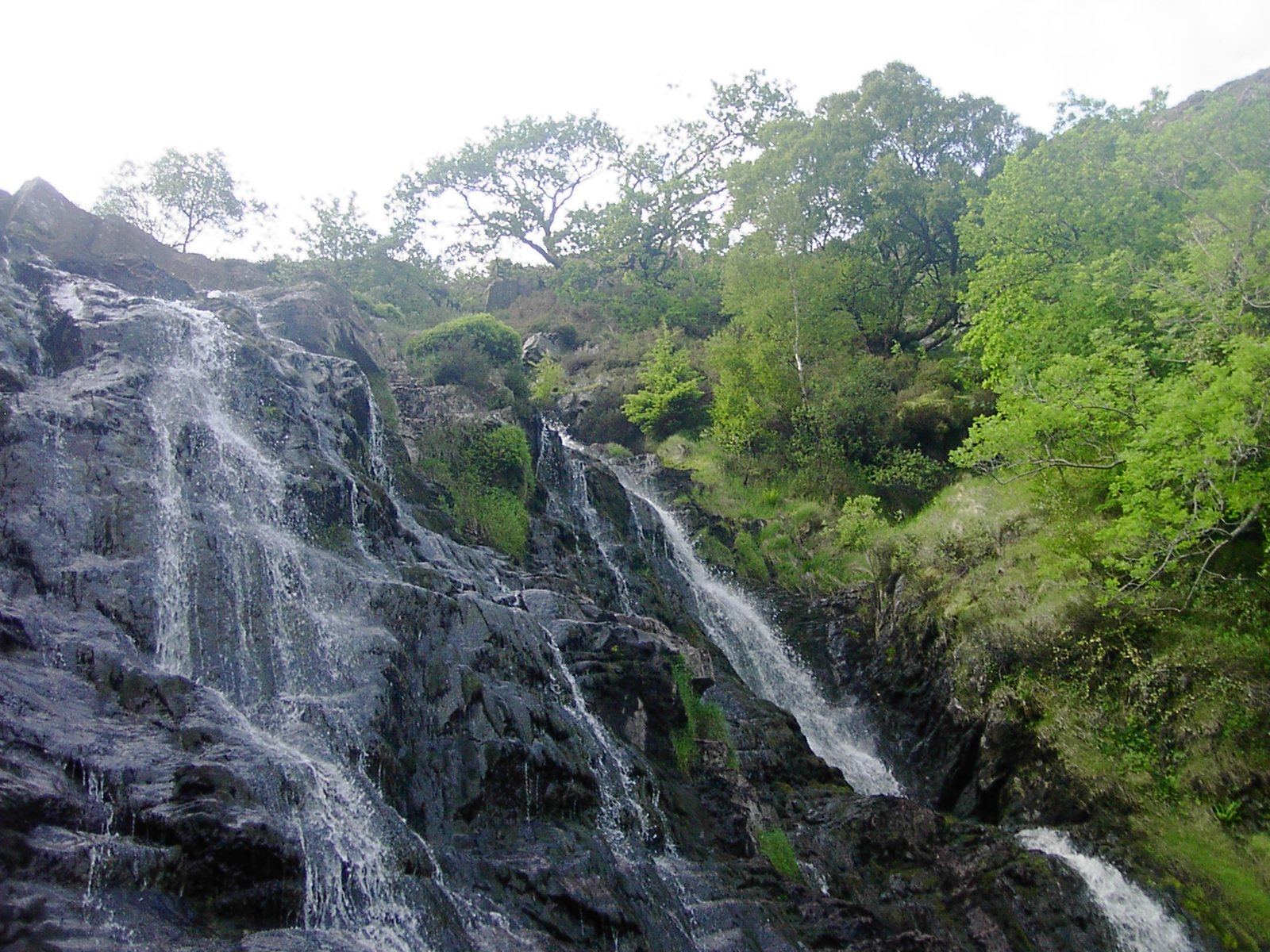
Rhiwargor Falls on the Lake Vyrnwy Estate

In 1879, George Deacon was instructed to prepare the parliamentary plans for the Vyrnwy Dam. The valley was chosen because of its size, favourable geology and its source, the River Vyrnwy, having a large water catchment area.

Thomas Hawksley was appointed as engineer-in-chief and prepared the design for a stone dam. Dam construction with great blocks of Welsh slate started in 1881 and was completed in 1888. Hawksley resigned in 1885 because of a conflict with George Deacon who was appointed as joint engineer. The dam was the first large stone-built dam in the United Kingdom and cost £620,000 (equivalent to £90 million in 2024). Earlier dams in Britain had been built using great earth embankments to hold back the water. In 1889, shortly after completion, the lake was stocked with 400,000 Loch Leven trout.

The aqueducts carrying water to Liverpool were constructed between 1881 and 1892.

Construction of the dam flooded the village of Llanwddyn. The residents of the village were not consulted about the proposal for a dam and opposed the plan. Their relocation involved the demolition of a church, two chapels, three inns, ten farmhouses, and 37 houses. A new settlement to house them was built lower down the valley by Liverpool Corporation.

== Description ==
The Vyrnwy dam is 44 metres (144 ft) high from the bottom of the valley, and 39 metres (128 ft) thick at the base; it is 358 metres (1,175 ft) long and has a road bridge running along the top. It is decorated with 31 arches each spanning 7.3 metres (24 ft) and two small towers each with four corner turrets rising 4.3 metres (14 ft) above the road surface. The dam was the first to be constructed with drainage tunnels designed to prevent a build up of pressure beneath the base. It is listed as a Grade I historic building by Cadw.

The dam was the first to carry water over its crest instead of in a channel at the side. At the bottom of the dam is a body of water known as a stilling basin necessary to absorb the energy when the water flows over the crest and into the valley, and to stop the water eroding the foundations of the dam.

A power house located under the west tower contains an electrical generator driven by water leaving the reservoir. Before mains electricity arrived in the 1960s this was the area's only source of power.

About 1,200 metres (0.75 mi) from the dam is the reservoir's straining tower. Standing only 30 metres (98 ft) from the shore, its purpose is to filter or strain out material in the water with a fine metal mesh, before the water flows along the aqueduct to Liverpool. Its architecture represents Gothic Revival, built at the same time as the dam. The tower as a whole is 47 metres (154 ft) tall, 32 metres (104 ft) of which is above top water level, and is topped with a pointed copper-clad roof, coloured light green.

The west and east towers release compensation water into the River Vyrnwy through huge valves; the river would dry up unless a minimum flow was maintained. Depending on the levels downstream, the reservoir can release from 25 to 45 megalitres (5 to 10 million imperial gallons) of compensation water daily. The flow is measured by Natural Resources Wales at a weir a few hundred metres downstream.

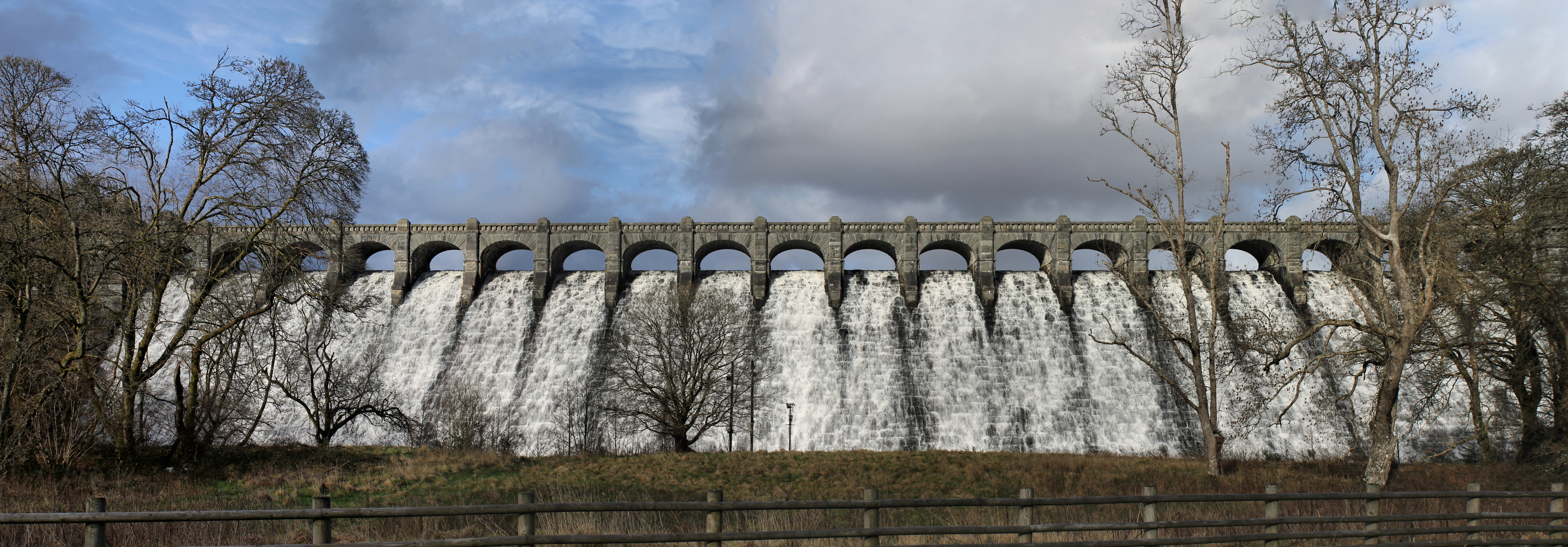

== Water supply ==
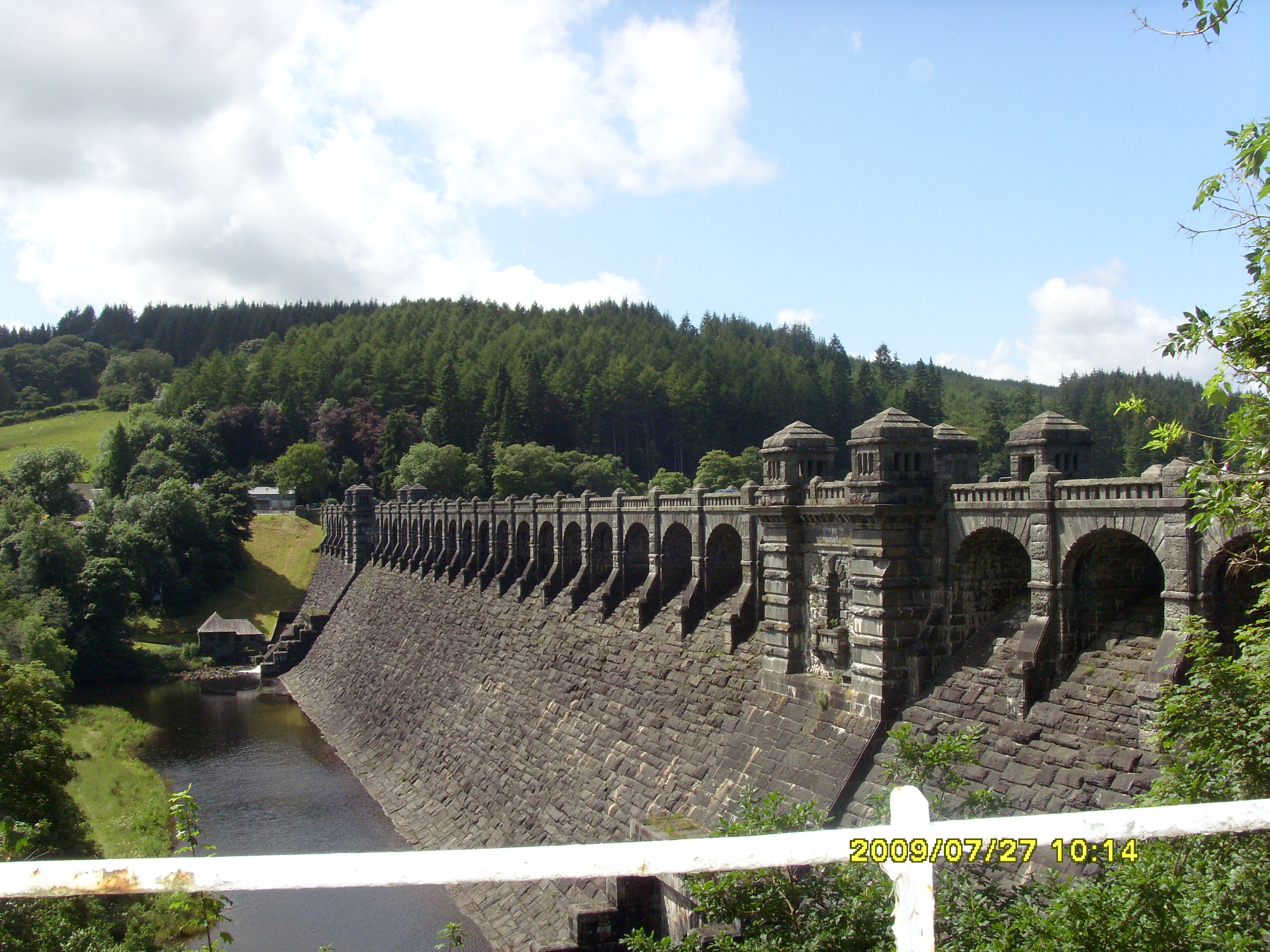
A sideview of the dam (2009)

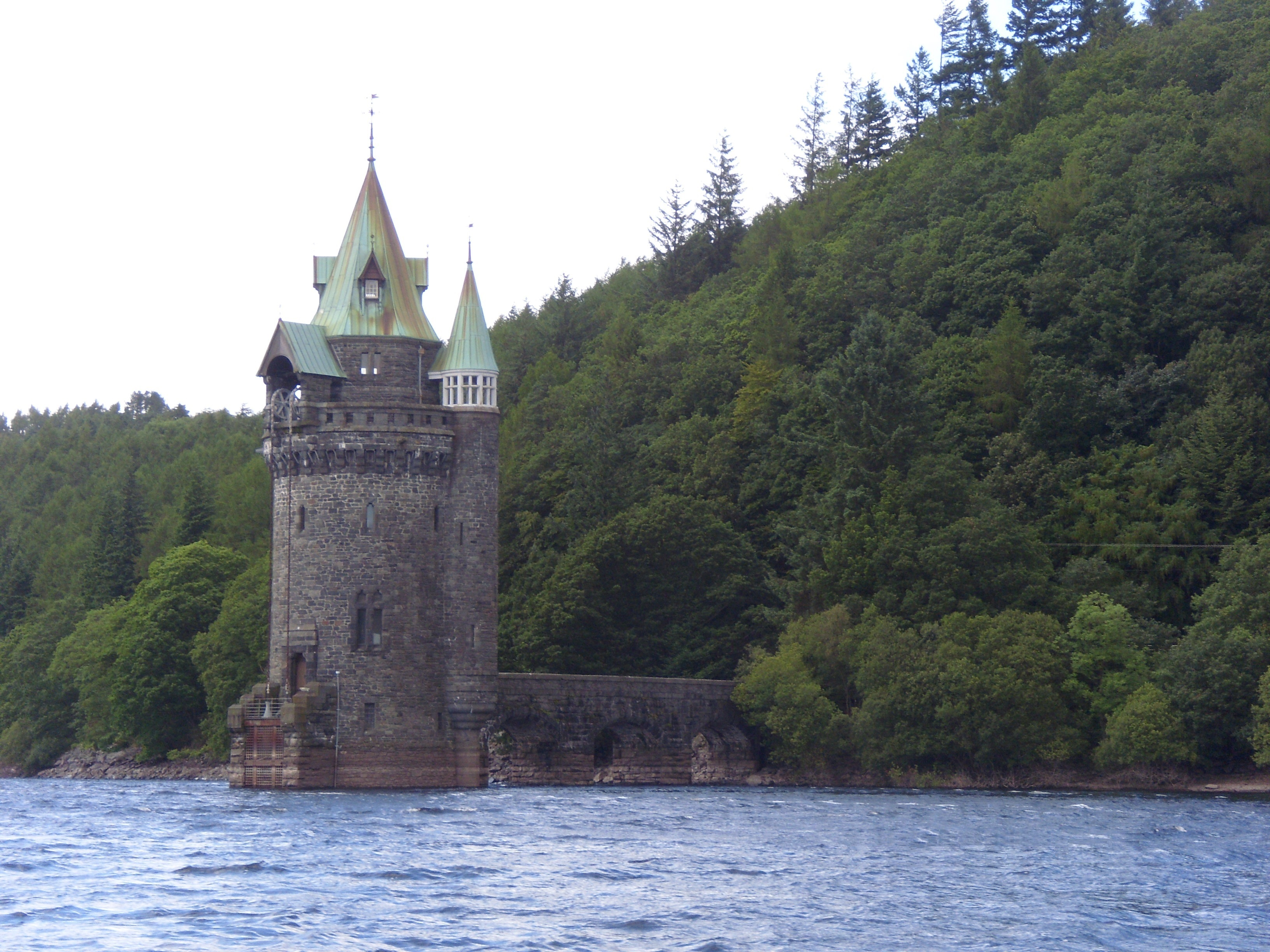
The Gothic revival straining tower

=== 19th century ===
The water from Lake Vyrnwy is carried 109 kilometres (68 mi) in the Vyrnwy Large Diameter Trunk Main (LDTM) aqueduct which originally consisted of two pipelines, made largely of cast iron. To help maintenance work on the 2.7 metres (9 ft) diameter cast-iron tunnel which took the aqueduct under the Mersey, riveted steel piping was also used, which was to become the norm for trunk water-main piping.

The aqueducts cross the valley floor near Penybontfawr and then run north of Llanrhaeadr-ym-Mochnant and Efail-rhyd on the north-east of the Tanat Valley. The aqueducts are largely underground although there are some visible surface features including air valves, the Cileos valve house, the Parc-uchaf balancing reservoirs, and a deep cutting to the west of Llanrhaeadr-ym-Mochnant.

Brick and concrete-lined tunnels carried pipes at Hirnant, Cynynion and Llanforda, and a fourth was later added at Aber, so that the Hirnant tunnel could be made accessible for maintenance.

=== 20th century ===
The first section of a third pipeline was laid from 1926 to 1938 using bituminous-coated steel. In 1946, a fourth pipeline was added south of Oswestry to increase capacity to 227 million litres per day.

The pipe crossings beneath the Mersey and the Manchester Ship Canal were reorganised in 1978–81. After privatisation of the water companies, responsibility for the Vyrnwy Dam and associated structures fell to Severn Trent Water, and since 2018 to its subsidiary company Hafren Dyfrdwy. The rights to the water abstraction are with United Utilities for drinking water supply to Liverpool.

=== 21st century ===
In 2013, United Utilities commenced a major refurbishment of the entire 240 km (150 mi) of the LDTM aqueduct, which was scheduled for completion in 2020. As of 2014 water provision relied on three parallel, 80 km long gravity pipelines, 1.1 metres (42 in) in diameter delivering up to 230,000 cubic metres (50×10^{6} imp gal) per day into reservoirs at Prescot, east of Liverpool, which supplied customers in Cheshire and Merseyside. The project cost up to £260 million by 2026.

== Nature reserve and conservation ==
Lake Vyrnwy is a designated Nature Reserve. The RSPB has several bird hides around the lake, where a number of rare species of birds are known to be seen. Around 90 species of bird have been recorded as breeding on the reserve, including the peregrine falcon, the pied flycatcher, the common redstart, the Eurasian siskin, Willow Tit and the wood warbler, although populations of black grouse and curlew have decreased since the 1990s. There are six species of bat, including the pipistrelle and brown long-eared bat. Butterfly species include purple hairstreaks, commas and peacocks. Dragonflies include golden ringed, common hawker and four spotted chaser.

Managing the moorland helps improve the habitat for red grouse and the short-eared owl. Heather moorland which grows on the mountains around the lake is being restored. In the past, heather was burnt, cut and the seeds collected to be sowed where the heather has gone. Burning at the Lake Vyrnwy moorland is no longer carried out, as the burning can have negative consequences for water management, namely water colouration.

The blanket bog is undergoing restoration, as is the lake habitat.

Sheep, cattle and ponies also graze on the heather, managed by tenant farmers who farm the moorland in accordance with organic agriculture.

Broadleaf trees are being planted to replace coniferous trees, and man-made features such as hedgerows and dry-stone walls are also being restored, and wildflower areas are being restored to help insects, birds and other wildlife. The RSPB anticipates that more than 250,000 trees will be planted over thirty-year period.

== Tourism ==
=== Wood sculpture ===
Llanwddyn has had since 1995 a sculpture park in the valley below the dam, containing many wooden carved works. There are large wooden picnic benches in the shape of leaves and trees on the west side of the lake at Llechwedd Ddu. Near the old village on the beach is a sculpture of dolphins which, when the lake rises in a flood, appear to be jumping out of the water. Several totems are carved into standing trees and re-erected fallen trunks.

=== Recreation ===
Activities in the area include sailing, hiking on Glyndŵr's Way, rock climbing, cycling, walking and horse riding. The Lake Vyrnwy Half Marathon is conducted annually. The RSPB have laid out seven waymarked trails ranging from 2 to 9 kilometres (1 to 5.5 mi) in a range of habitats.

=== Tallest tree ===
The site was once home to the tallest tree in the UK, a Douglas Fir 63.79 metres (209.3 ft) high. This was damaged in stormy weather during the winter of 2010-2011 and had to be felled at 124 years old in March 2011. A 15.2 metres (50 ft) stump was left intact, which in autumn 2011 had its top carved into a 2 metres (6.6 ft) tall giant outstretched hand. A nearby Douglas Fir is now, at 60.62 metres (198.9 ft), the tallest tree in Wales.
