= River Vyrnwy =

River in Powys, Wales and Shropshire, England

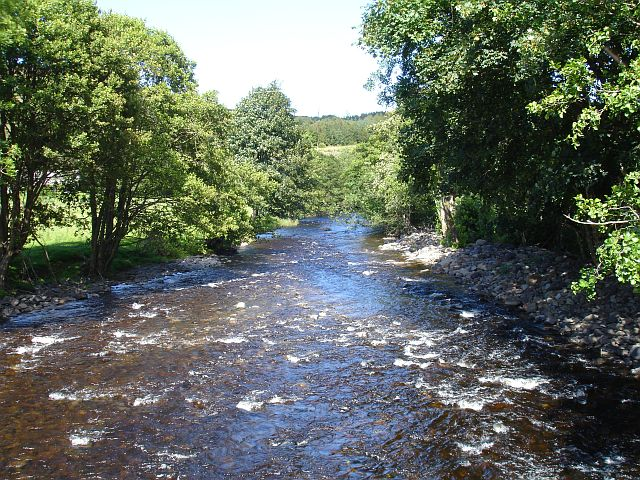
- Vyrnwy near Pont Llogel
- Native name: Afon Efyrnwy (Welsh)

Location
- Country: Wales, England
- Counties: Powys, Shropshire

Physical characteristics
- Source: Lake Vyrnwy
- Mouth
  - location: confluence with River Severn near Melverley
  - coordinates: 52.7363°N 2.9966°W
- Length: 40 mi (64 km)

The River Vyrnwy (/ˈvɜːrnwi/; Welsh: Afon Efyrnwy, pronounced [ɛˈvərnʊɨ]) flows through northern Powys, Wales, and Shropshire, England. The name derives from Severn, the river of which it is a tributary.

== Course ==
The river used to be sourced from the many rivers and streams running off the mountains surrounding the Vyrnwy valley. However, since the Lake Vyrnwy dam was built in the 1880s, the river has flowed directly from the base of the dam. The river runs for 39.7 miles (63.9 km), and the last 8 miles (12.9 km) form part of the Welsh/English border between Powys and Shropshire. It eventually joins the River Severn near the village of Melverley.

== Recreational ==
The river is paddled frequently by kayakers and canoeists, with the upper reaches of the river being predominantly Grade II white water with a few Grade III sections, most notably the Vyrnwy Gorge near the village of Dolanog. The other most prominent feature of the upper river is Dolanog Falls, a 20-foot-high (6 m) man-made weir that requires a portage by both kayaks and canoes.

Much of the lower river below Pontrobert is Grade I and a good touring river due to being relatively placid when not in flood.
