= Llanfihangel-yng-Ngwynfa =

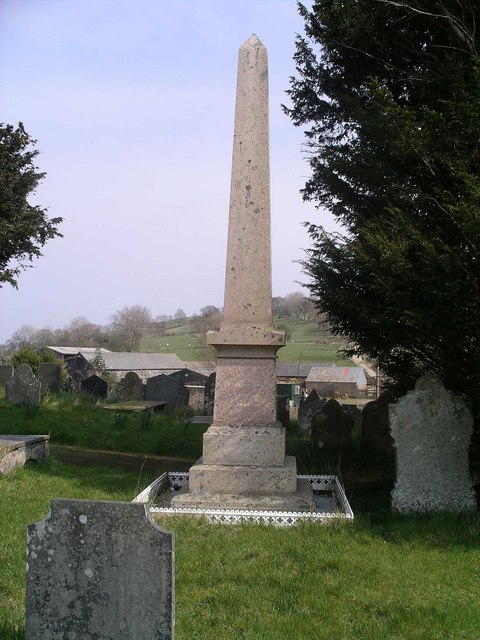
- The memorial to the poet and hymnwriter Ann Griffiths in Llanfihangel-yng-Ngwynfa churchyard

- Location within Powys
- Population: 467 (2011)
- OS grid reference: SJ 0816
- Principal area: Powys
- Country: Wales
- Sovereign state: United Kingdom
- Post town: WELSHPOOL
- Postcode district: SY21
- Post town: LLANFYLLIN
- Postcode district: SY22
- Police: Dyfed-Powys
- Fire: Mid and West Wales
- Ambulance: Welsh
- UK Parliament: Montgomeryshire and Glyndŵr
- List of places UK Wales Powys 52.7414°N 3.3639°W Community map: Map of the Llanfihangel community

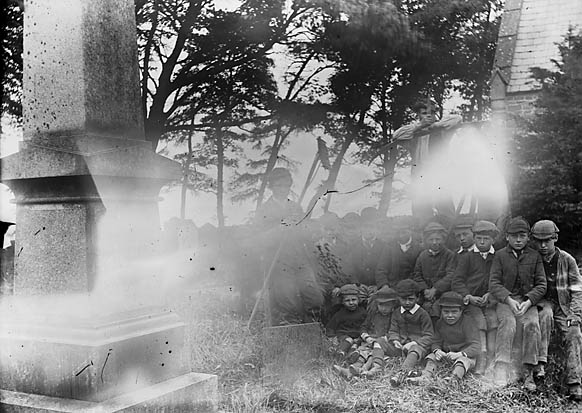
A group of boys in the churchyard, photographed by John Thomas in about 1885

Llanfihangel-yng-Ngwynfa (Welsh pronunciation) is a former parish in Montgomeryshire, now forming a major part of the community of Llanfihangel in Powys, which covers an area of 5,366 hectares (20.72 mi^{2}). Its Community Council extends to take in Dolanog and Llwydiarth, having approximately 413 registered voters (as at 2012). The parish originally consisted of the following townships: Cefncleisiog, Cydwnfa, Dolwar, Fachwen, Farchwell, Fynnonarthwr, Garthucha, Halfen, Llaethbwlch, Llwydiarth, Nanty-Candy, and Rhiewlas. Dolanog seceded from Llanfihangel in 1856.

Poet and hymnwriter Ann Griffiths (1776–1805) was born in, and is buried, in this place. The architect Jacob Owen (1778-1870) was also born in Llanfihangel. Griffiths and Owen were baptised in the Anglican church but each found their way to Methodism, Griffiths a Calvinist, Owen a Wesleyan.

== Geography and amenities ==
The main village is scattered along a gently winding uphill road extending many miles past St Michael's Church to the south. The housing becomes denser just south of the Llanfyllin to Llanwddyn road, WNW of Welshpool; on the east side is the cemetery, six houses largely still owned by the local authority, and a couple of bungalows. The church is no longer used, and is unsafe.

At the centre are The Goat Inn, a post office/shop, and the village hall, opened in 1981, which has frequent whole-community, family and retired community events.

== History ==
A war memorial is at the centre of the village.

=== Ffair Llan ===
A fair, known as Ffair Llan, used to be held every year on 9 May, when cattle and sheep were sold to visiting dealers. Piglets were brought by horse and cart, with a mesh strung over to prevent their escape.

== Demographics ==
Llanfihangel community's population was 467, according to the 2011 census; a 9.5% decrease since the 516 people noted in 2001.

The 2011 census showed 52.6% of the population could speak Welsh, a fall from 65.0% in 2001. The percentage declined further to 47.9 in the 2021 census. This is due to a complex combination of Welsh speakers - particularly of the younger generation - moving away, and immigration from England.

== Governance ==
Llanfihangel-yng-Ngwynfa is in the Llanfihangel electoral ward which elects a councillor to Powys County Council. This ward had a population of 1,049 at the 2011 census.

== Life in a Welsh Countryside ==
In 1950 Life in a Welsh Countryside, A Social Study of Llanfihangel-yng-Ngwynfa by Alwyn D. Rees was published. This was soon seen as a classic study of the social structure and life in a predominantly Welsh-speaking rural community in upland Wales. This study describes the farming, kindred relationships, customs and traditions, and the role of religion, particularly the chapels.

In 2003 the Llanfihangel Social History Group published A Welsh Countryside Revisited: A new study of Llanfihangel-yng-Ngwynfa, which records the changes since the original publication such as decline in chapel attendance and preferred use of Welsh.

== Literature ==
- Morgan V. et al. A (2003), A Welsh Countryside Revisited: A new study of Llanfihangel-yng-Ngwynfa, Powysland Club, Llanfihangel Social History Group.
- Rees A.D., (1950), Life in a Welsh Countryside, A Social Study of Llanfihangel-yng-Ngwynfa, University of Wales Press, Cardiff.
- Thomas, D.R.(1911) History of the Diocese of Saint Asaph, Vol II, 227–230.
