= Melverley =

Coordinates: 52.742°N 2.988°W

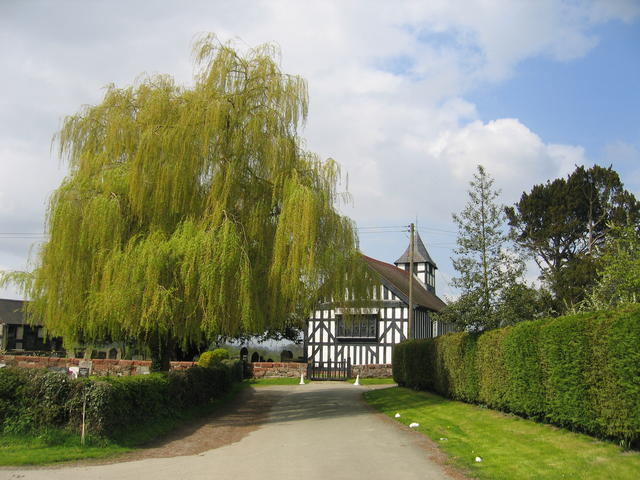
- Approaching St Peter's Church, Melverley

- Location within Shropshire
- Population: 156 (2011)
- OS grid reference: SJ333165
- Civil parish: Melverley
- Unitary authority: Shropshire
- Ceremonial county: Shropshire
- Region: West Midlands
- Country: England
- Sovereign state: United Kingdom
- Post town: OSWESTRY
- Postcode district: SY10
- Dialling code: 01691
- Police: West Mercia
- Fire: Shropshire
- Ambulance: West Midlands
- UK Parliament: North Shropshire

Melverley is a village in Shropshire, England, situated on the River Severn and the River Vyrnwy, near the Powys hills and the border with Wales. The population of the civil parish at the 2011 census was 156. The village, and the large rural area that surrounds it, was years ago famous for flooding from the nearby rivers but since the installation of extensive defences in Shrewsbury and improvements to the flood defences in and around the Melverley area flooding now causes no problems for the majority of residents. It is a controlled flood area, meaning that water is allowed to flow across the open fields and held for a few hours until the river levels fall. Melverley Green is a small village to the north of Melverley.

== St Peter's Church ==
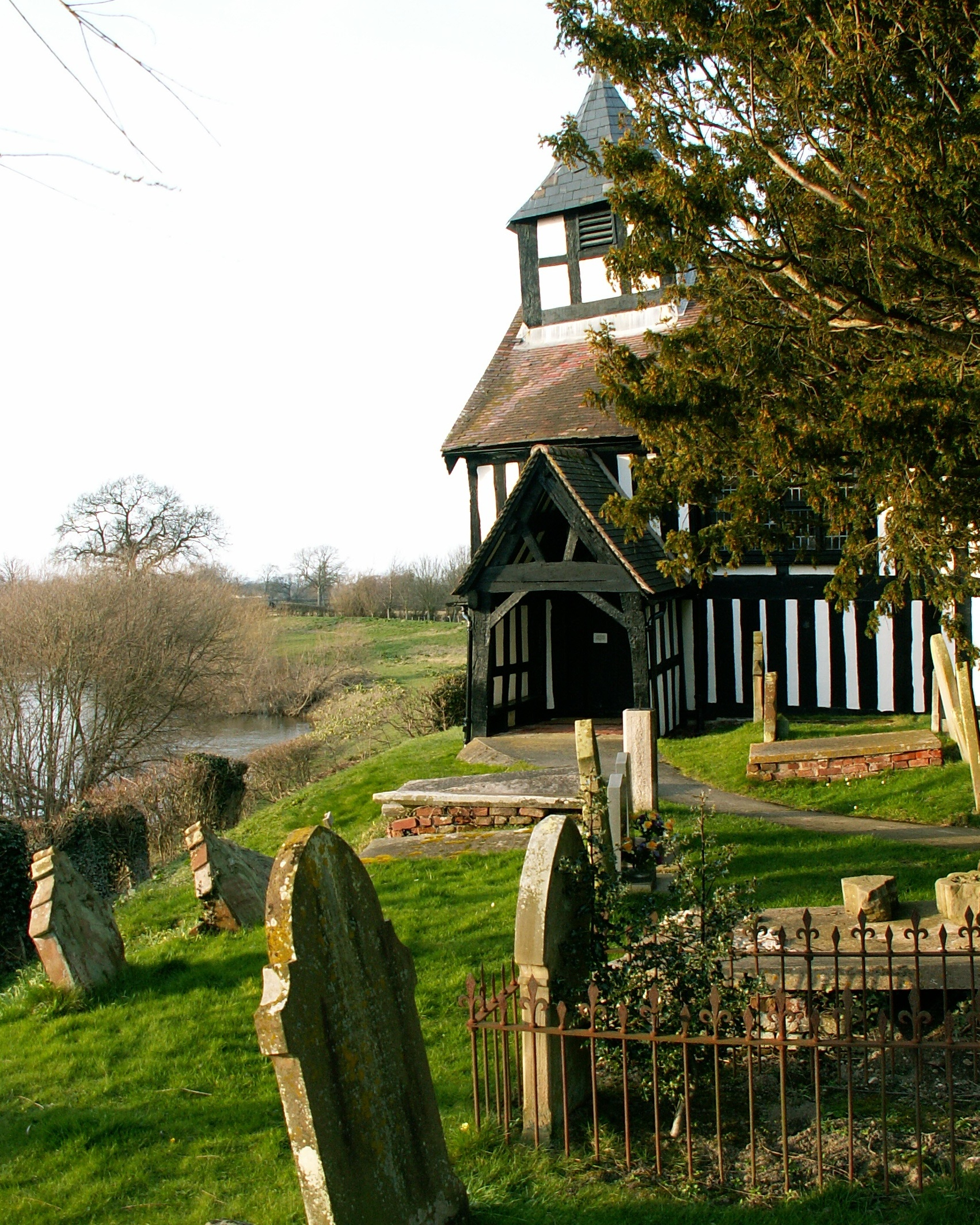
St. Peter's Church

The notable building in Melverley is the black and white timber-framed St Peter's Church which stands on the banks of the River Vyrnwy; it is one of only three such churches to be found in Shropshire and one of 27 in England and the oldest of its kind. The church was rebuilt in 1406 after Owain Glyndŵr burnt it to the ground. The church has a Jacobean pulpit and a chained bible (also known as a "Great Bible"). The stained glass in the chancel window, installed 1925–28, is all by the C & Kempe workshops. One of its lights is a memorial to parish men who died in World War I. It is thought that the design of St Peter's may have inspired the architecture of St Andrew's Episcopalian church in Newcastle, Maine.

== Melverley and the "Potts Line" ==
Melverley was situated on the Potts Railway Line designed to link Shrewsbury with the small village of Llanymynech, near Oswestry. Unlike many stops on the line, the station at Melverley had a brick shed for waiting passengers (many stations had wooden facilities and timber platforms). A viaduct was built at Melverley in order for the line to cross the Severn but this crashed into the river in 1902. The viaduct was rebuilt to enable the re-opening of the line on April 13, 1911. It was subsequently declared unsafe on several occasions and was a contributory factor to the demise of the Potts Line.

Today, little evidence of the railway remains at Melverley save for some bricks marking the platform edge. However, a road has been built along the course of part of this branch line to Criggion utilizing the old railway bridge over the Severn and making a convenient connection to the main road at Crew Green. This is a single-track road with passing places but is unusually direct and level compared to other country lanes in the area.

== See also ==
- Listed buildings in Melverley
