= Llanwddyn =

- Location within Powys
- Area: 95.92 km^{2} (37.03 sq mi)
- Population: 257 (2011)
  - Density: 3/km^{2} (7.8/sq mi)
- Principal area: Powys
- Country: Wales
- Sovereign state: United Kingdom
- Post town: Llanfyllin
- Postcode district: SY22
- Police: Dyfed-Powys
- Fire: Mid and West Wales
- Ambulance: Welsh
- UK Parliament: Montgomeryshire and Glyndŵr
- Senedd Cymru – Welsh Parliament: Montgomeryshire
- List of places UK Wales Powys 52.7613°N 3.4517°W Community map: Map of the community

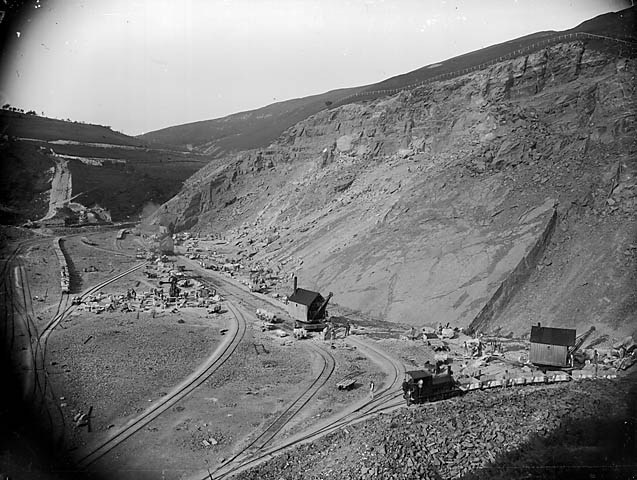
The Quarry, Llanwddyn

Llanwddyn (Welsh pronunciation: /ɬanˈuːðɪn/) is a village and community in Montgomeryshire, Powys, Wales. The community is centred on the Lake Vyrnwy reservoir. The original Llanwddyn village, about 2 miles (3.2 km) northwest, was submerged when the reservoir was created in the 1880s.

== Geography ==
Llanwddyn borders the county of Gwynedd to the northeast, with the Powys communities of Llangynog and Pen-y-Bont-Fawr to the northwest, Llanfihangel-yng-Ngwynfa to the south east and Banwy to the southwest. The community is sparsely populated, but includes the village of Abertridwr as well as the new village of Llanwddyn.

According to the 2011 census the community had 99 occupied households and a population of 257, with only 84 of the residents born in Wales. This is a 17% decrease since the 310 people noted in 2001. In 2011, only 38% of the population could speak Welsh, a decline from 60% in 2001.

=== Lake Vyrnwy ===
The main feature of the community is the 4.54 square kilometres (1.75 sq mi) reservoir, which drowned the original village when it was created in the 1880s.

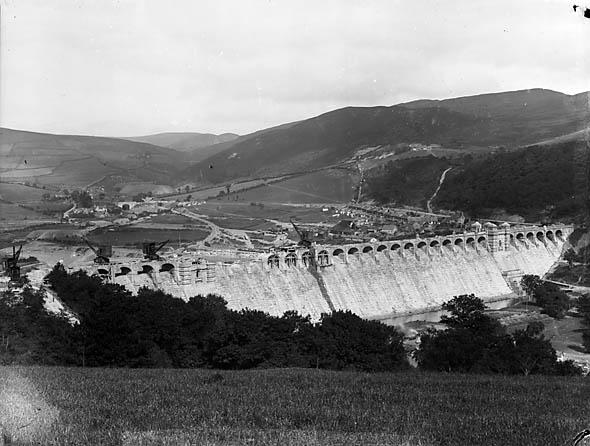
Llanwddyn Dam c.1885 under construction

=== Climate ===
Climate data for Lake Vyrnwy No 2 (360m elevation) 1981–2010
Month	Jan	Feb	Mar	Apr	May	Jun	Jul	Aug	Sep	Oct	Nov	Dec	Year
Mean daily maximum °C (°F)	5.5 (41.9)	5.5 (41.9)	7.6 (45.7)	10.2 (50.4)	13.5 (56.3)	16.0 (60.8)	17.9 (64.2)	17.5 (63.5)	15.1 (59.2)	11.5 (52.7)	8.2 (46.8)	5.9 (42.6)	11.2 (52.2)
Mean daily minimum °C (°F)	1.0 (33.8)	0.6 (33.1)	2.1 (35.8)	3.3 (37.9)	6.1 (43.0)	8.7 (47.7)	10.8 (51.4)	10.7 (51.3)	9.0 (48.2)	6.4 (43.5)	3.6 (38.5)	1.4 (34.5)	5.3 (41.5)
Average rainfall mm (inches)	193.1 (7.60)	143.3 (5.64)	138.6 (5.46)	96.4 (3.80)	92.5 (3.64)	90.6 (3.57)	96.2 (3.79)	94.2 (3.71)	115.8 (4.56)	199.9 (7.87)	176.2 (6.94)	198.6 (7.82)	1,635.4 (64.39)
Average rainy days (≥ 1.0 mm)	18.0	14.0	16.6	13.0	13.3	12.3	12.7	13.8	13.2	18.4	17.4	18.8	181.5
Source: metoffice.gov.uk

== History ==
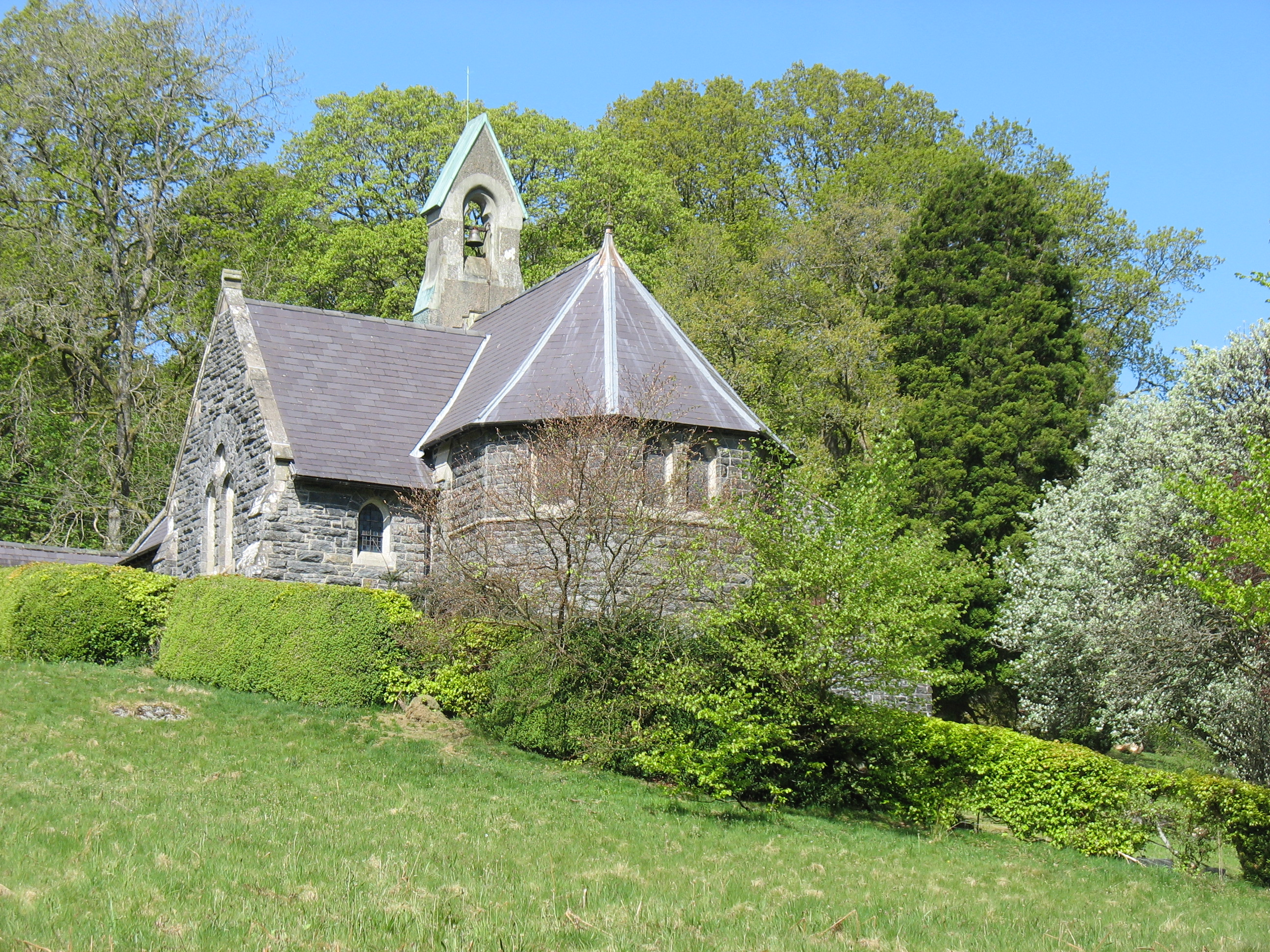
St Wddyn's Church, dating from 1888

By the mid-19th century the village of Llanwddyn consisted of thirty seven houses, a church and two chapels, three pubs and several shops. The population of the parish had dropped from 668 in 1831 to 443 in 1871. In 1873 the local vicar, Reverend Thomas H. Evans, published a mass of information about Llanwddyn in Volume VI of the Montgomeryshire Collections. He described the abundance of water with, for example, one third of the valley being regularly under water during the winter.

In 1877 the expanding English city of Liverpool identified the Vyrnwy Valley as a suitable site for a reservoir to supply fresh water to its citizens. A parliamentary bill was drawn up to authorise the construction of a dam and reservoir. The population of Llanwddyn were not consulted, though they presented a signed petition against the proposals.

The Liverpool Corporation Waterworks Act 1880 was passed and construction of a dam across the valley began in 1881. It took seven years to complete. The old village was demolished, the valley flooded, and the water reached the lip of the dam on 22 November 1889.

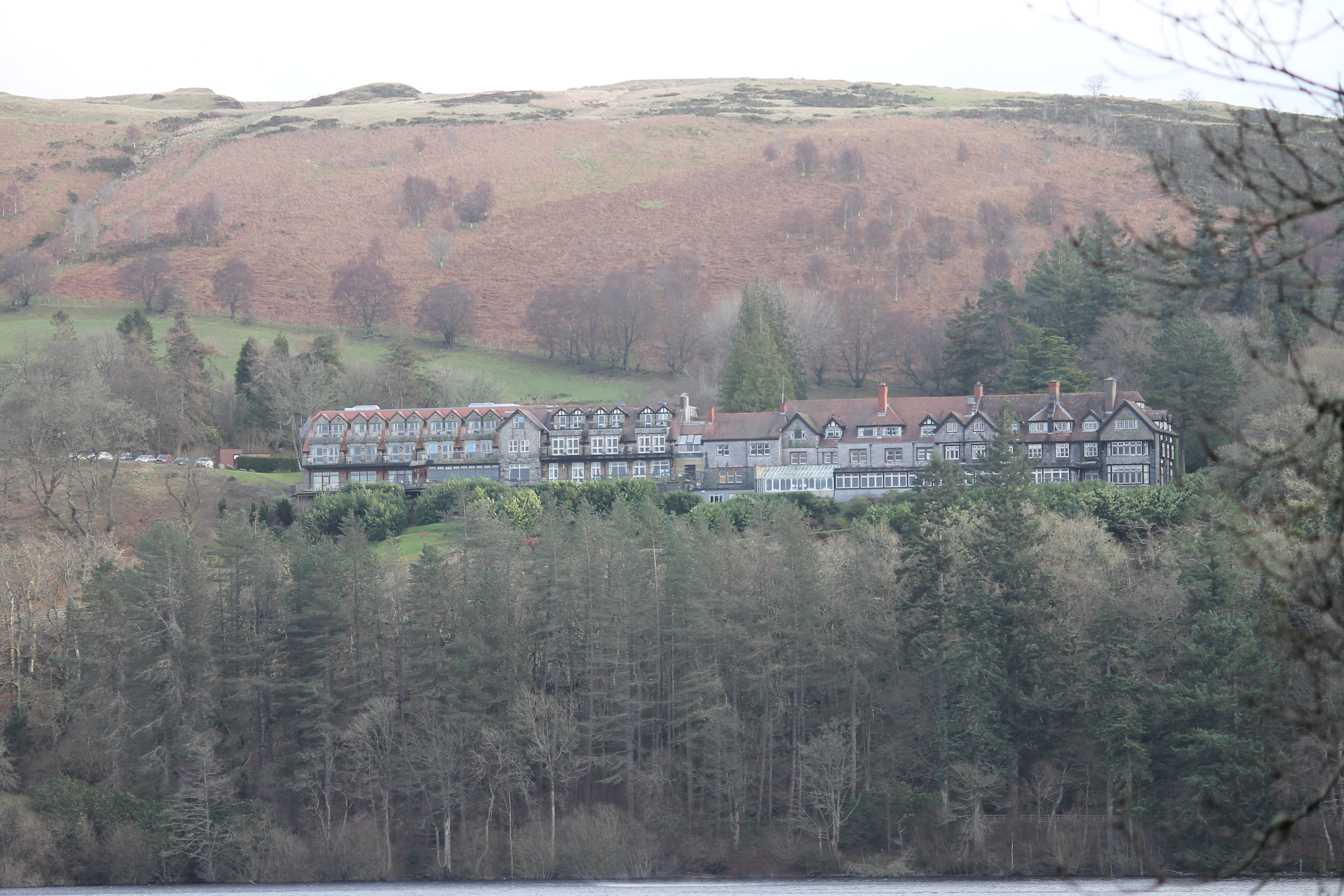
Lake Vyrnwy Hotel, Llanwddyn

A new village was constructed below the dam to house the original residents. It included a church, dedicated to St Wddyn, which was consecrated on 27 November 1888, the day before the valve of the dam was finally closed. A hydroelectric power plant was built for the village in 1902. The reservoir brought jobs and relative prosperity to the community, with the population remaining relatively stable for the next 70 years.

In 1974, ownership of the estate passed from the Liverpool Corporation to the Severn Trent Water Authority.

== Governance ==
Llanwddyn has a community council which has up to seven locally elected councillors.

The village also gave its name to the Llanwddyn electoral ward which elected a councillor to Powys County Council. Following a boundary review, Llanwddyn was merged to become part of the larger ward of Banwy, Llanfihangel and Llanwddyn, effective from the 2022 local elections.

== Cultural references ==
The flooding of Llanwddyn is referenced in W. G. Sebald's 2001 novel Austerlitz; the titular character is disturbed and affected by his imagining of the drowned village after being shown the Vyrnwy reservoir by his adoptive father, who was born there.
