= George Deacon (civil engineer) =

English civil engineer (1843–1909)

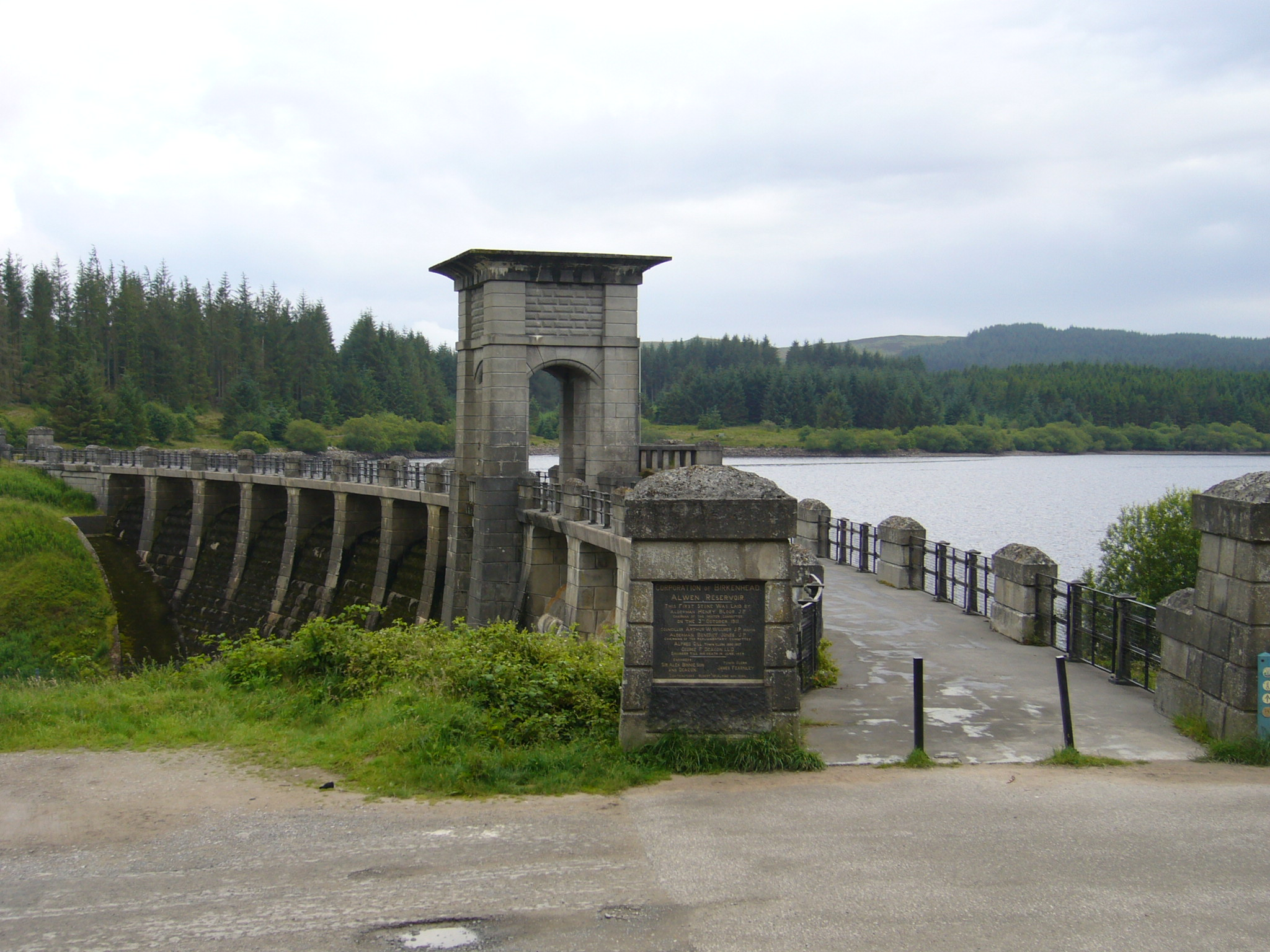
- Alwen Dam
- Born: 26 July 1843; Bridgwater
- Died: 17 June 1909; Westminster
- Occupation: Civil engineer

George Frederick Deacon (26 July 1843 – 17 June 1909) was an English civil engineer.

A pupil and lifelong friend of William Thomson, 1st Baron Kelvin, Deacon was Lord Kelvin's assistant on the SS Great Eastern cable-laying expedition. He was both borough engineer and water engineer to Liverpool from 1871 to 1880, and water engineer to the city from 1880 to 1890. During this latter period, jointly with Thomas Hawksley, he designed the Lake Vyrnwy scheme to supply Liverpool's water. Deacon was solely responsible for the design of the Lake Vyrnwy Straining Tower, designed in a Gothic Revival style. In 1890 he established a consultancy in Westminster which designed waterworks for many UK towns. This merged with another firm to become Alexander Binnie & Sons, Deacon.

Amongst his inventions were the Deacon waste-water meter to locate water leakage, and electrical meters to measure river flow.

At the time of his death he was working on a scheme to provide water to Birkenhead from the River Alwen.
