= Dolarddyn Crossing railway station =

Short-lived railway station in Castle Caereinion, Powys

Dolarddyn Crossing
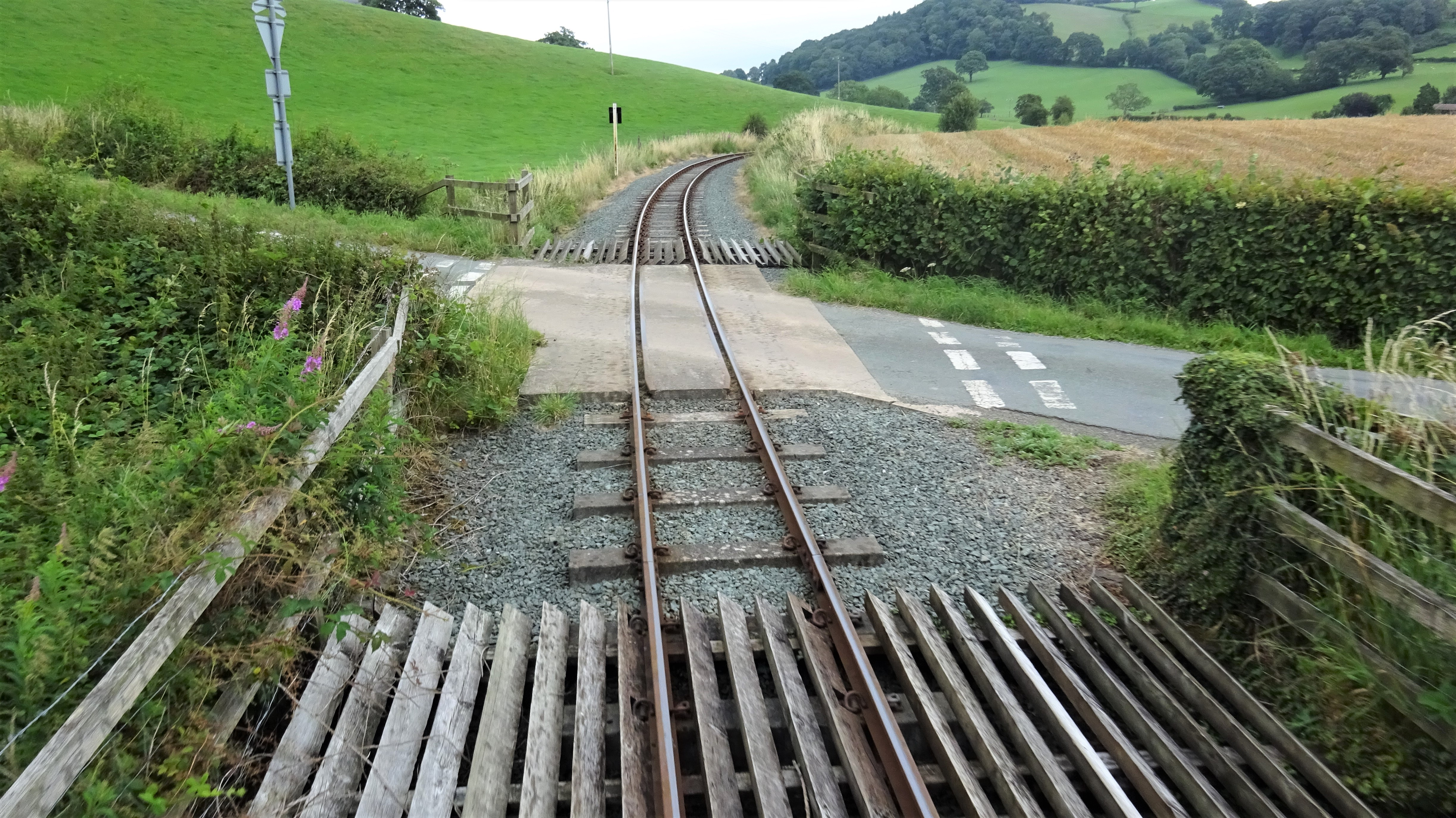
- The level crossing in 2019

General information
- Location: Castle Caereinion, Montgomeryshire; Wales
- Coordinates: 51.7466°N 3.564°W
- Grid reference: SN921064

Other information
- Status: Disused

History
- Original company: Great Western Railway

Key dates
- 8 July 1929: Opened
- 9 February 1931: Closed
Location

Dolarddyn Crossing railway station served the village of Castle Caereinion, in the historical county of Montgomeryshire, Wales, from 1929 to 1931 on the Welshpool and Llanfair Light Railway.

== History ==
The station was opened on 8 July 1929 by the Great Western Railway, although it was in the company timetable in July 1904 and used only for picnic parties. It became a regular stop on 16 March 1929 and the full service followed a few months later. Its full use was short-lived as it closed to passengers, along with the line's passenger service, on 9 February 1931.

Preceding station	Historical railways	Following station
Castle Caereinion	Great Western Railway; Welshpool and Llanfair Light Railway	Cyfronydd
