= Cyfronydd Hall =

Welsh country house

Coordinates: 52.6629°N 3.2685°W

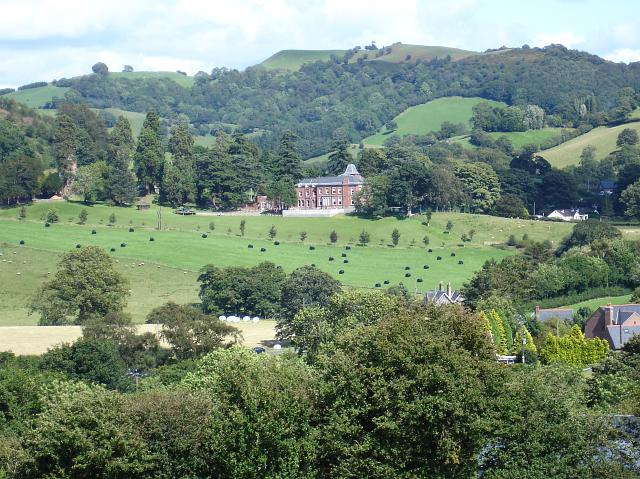
Cyfronydd Hall from Lower Bryn Elen

Cyfronydd Hall is a Welsh country house located on the A458 road between Welshpool and the hamlet of Cyfronydd, Llanfair Caereinion. It was built in about 1865 for the Pryce Jones family after an earlier hall on the site burned down. It once formed part of the 1,922-acre (778 ha) Cyfronydd Estate.

== History ==
Cyfronydd Hall was sold by Major Hamilton Pryce in 1927 and at that time it had 19 bedrooms and one bathroom. In 1938 it was purchased for £7,250 by Montgomeryshire County Council for use as a girls' school and remodelled, with the number of bedrooms being reduced to 14 and the number of bathrooms increased to four. The property at that time had 44 acres (18 ha) of land.

In the 1990s the property was bought by an English couple who gradually repaired and improved the property over a ten-year period. They added a swimming pool and a spa and sold the property in 2015 to William Hague and Ffion Hague. The estate now has 12.7 acres (5.1 ha).

== Architecture ==
Pevsner Architectural Guides describe the present building briefly as follows: "Large square brick house of c. 1865 with vaguely French detail, particularly on the three-storey entrance tower with its chateau roof." Country Life has described the building more enthusiastically as follows:

an elegantly symmetrical country house built around an impressive central atrium flooded with light from the glass ceiling overhead. Radiating out from the hall are the main reception rooms-drawing room, dining room, sitting room and library-all of which have large sash windows with spectacular panoramic views over the rolling countryside of the majestic Banwy valley. An intimate study overlooks the rear garden, with its towering beeches, oaks and cedars. The first floor houses the splendid master suite and five further bedrooms, which all have luxurious bathrooms. Four more bedrooms and bathrooms, each with its own quirky, individual character, are located on the floor above.

The building does not appear to be registered by Cadw as a listed building.

== Railway ==
Cyfronydd Hall is served by the nearby Cyfronydd railway station on the Welshpool and Llanfair Light Railway, a narrow-gauge heritage railway.
