= Heniarth railway station =

Railway station in Heniarth, Powys, Wales

Heniarth

General information
- Location: Heniarth, Powys; Wales
- Coordinates: 52.663544°N 3.297949°W
- Grid reference: SJ123081
- System: Station on heritage railway
- Owner: Welshpool and Llanfair Light Railway
- Manager: Welshpool and Llanfair Light Railway
- Platforms: 1

Key dates
- 6 April 1903: opened
- 9 February 1931: closed for passengers
- 3 November 1956: closed completely
- 6 April 1963: reopened
Location

Heniarth Halt railway station is an unstaffed halt on the narrow gauge Welshpool and Llanfair Light Railway serving the hamlet of Heniarth. This station is a request halt and lies 6 3/4 miles (10.9 km) from Welshpool's Raven Square terminus. Alighting passengers are required to step down onto the grass as there is no platform. The railway crosses the River Banwy Bridge 200 yards to the east of the halt.

Opened as Heniarth Gate on 6 April 1903 the station was renamed 'Heniarth' on 1 February 1913.

Originally the halt had a loop which catered for farm and timber traffic. The Great Western Railway withdrew passenger services on 9 February 1931. and the line closed completely on 3 November 1956. By 1963 the line had a passenger service restored by the Welshpool and Llanfair Railway.

== Notes ==
Preceding station	Heritage railways	Following station
Llanfair Caereinion Terminus	Welshpool & Llanfair Light Railway	Cyfronydd towards Welshpool Raven Square
