= Dougal (steam locomotive) =

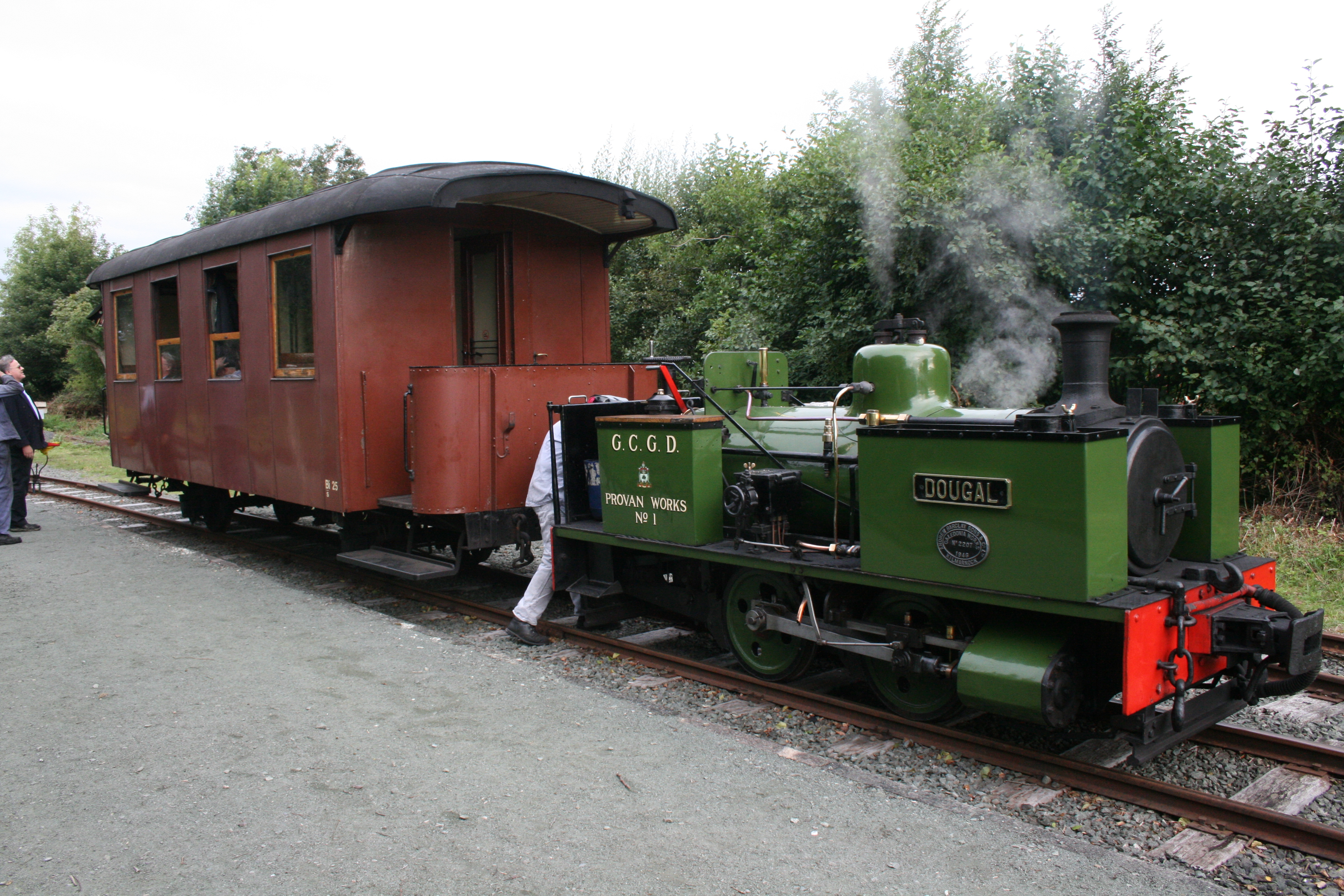
- Dougal with one of the Austrian 4-wheel carriages.
Type and origin
- Power type: Steam
- Builder: Andrew Barclay Sons & Co.
- Serial number: 2207
- Build date: 1946
- Total produced: 1
Specifications
- Configuration
  - Whyte: 0-4-0T
- Gauge: 2 ft 6 in (762 mm)
- Driver dia.: 2 ft 0 in (610 mm)
- Loco weight: 6 long tons 10 cwt (14,600 lb or 6.6 t)
- Boiler pressure: 140 lbf/in^{2} (970 kPa)
- Cylinders: Two, outside
Career
- Operators: Glasgow Corporation's Provan Gasworks; Welshpool and Llanfair Light Railway
- Numbers: GCGD: 1; WL&LR: 8

Dougal is a 2 ft 6 in (762 mm) narrow gauge 0-4-0T steam locomotive, built by Andrew Barclay Sons & Co. Ltd., Kilmarnock in 1946. It is currently running on the Welshpool and Llanfair Light Railway.

== History ==
=== Provan Gasworks ===
The engine was built to work at Provan Gasworks, Glasgow in 1946. At the time Provan Gasworks had an extensive 2 ft 6 in (762 mm) gauge railway running through the gas works and Dougal was one of the many engines built to run on it. Gas works lines like this usually meant working in the very restricted confines of retort houses, explaining Dougal's small and especially low shape. In 1958 the gas works were closed and Dougal was no longer required. In 1961 Dougal was saved from scrap and later sold to the Welshpool and Llanfair Light Railway.

=== Welshpool and Llanfair Railway ===
In 1969 Dougal was bought by the Welshpool and Llanfair Light Railway and was first steamed there in 1975. Although too small to operate the standard service on the railway it is steamed regularly at bank holidays and gala weekends, where it can often be seen shunting between Llanfair Caereinion and Cyfronydd. Dougal has been out of service since 2014 awaiting funding for a new boiler.

In 2018, Dougal was shipped to Taiwan as part of a cooperation agreement between the Welshpool and Llanfair Light Railway and the Taiwan Sugar Corporation, which operates five short heritage railways at former mills. Dougal returned to Wales in April 2019.

== Bibliography ==
- Cartwright, R.I. (1986). The Welshpool and Llanfair Light Railway Illustrated Guide. The Welshpool & Llanfair Light Railway Preservation Co. Ltd.
- Rushton, G. (2010). The Welshpool and Llanfair Light Railway Traveller's Guide. The Welshpool & Llanfair Light Railway Preservation Co. Ltd.
