= Welshpool and Llanfair Light Railway No.1 The Earl and No.2 Countess =

Preserved narrow gauge 0-6-0T locomotives

W&LLR 1 The Earl & 2 Countess
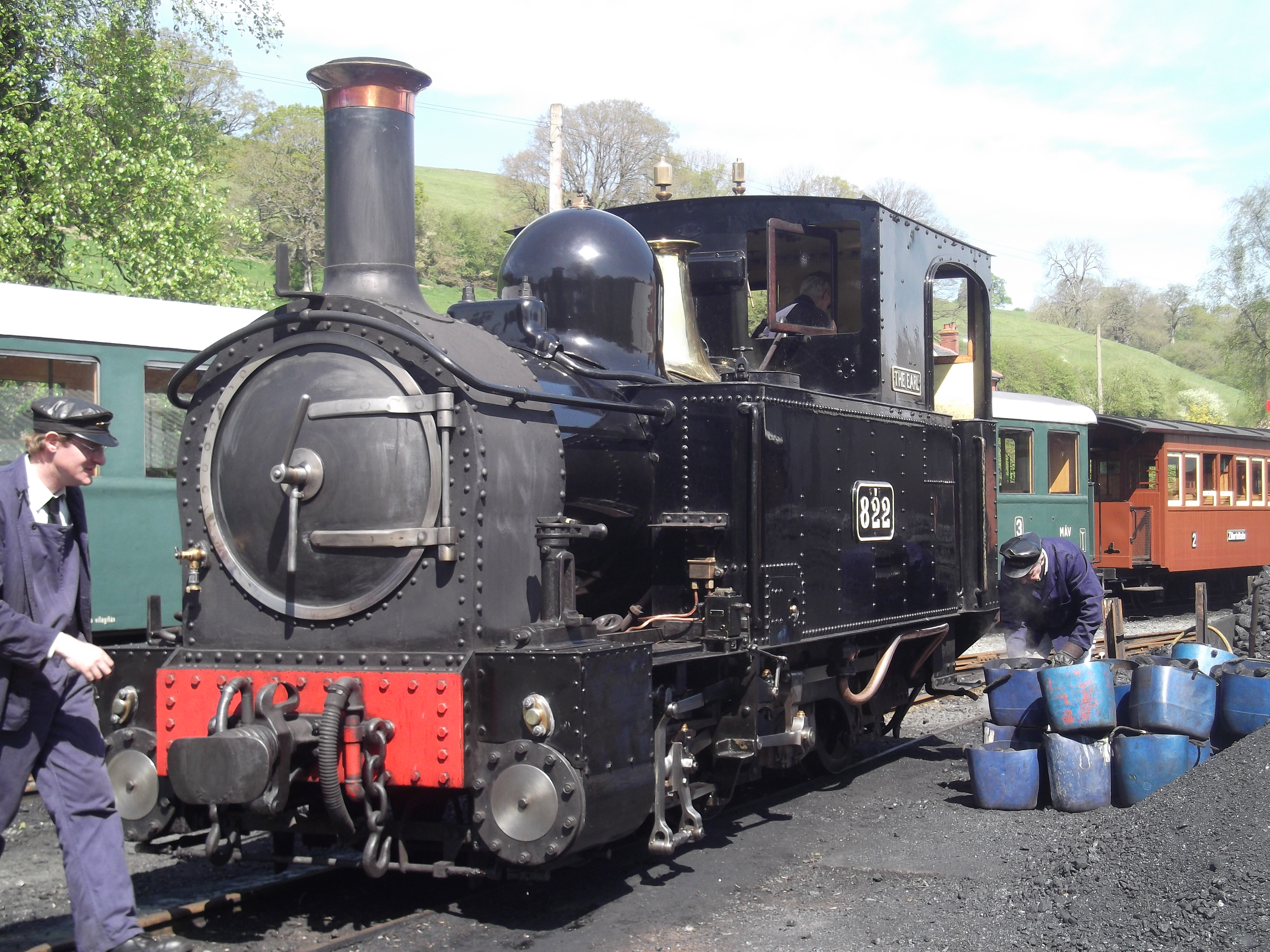
- The Earl at Llanfair Caereinion
Type and origin
- Power type: Steam
- Builder: Beyer, Peacock & Co. Ltd.
- Serial number: 3496–3497
- Build date: 1902
- Total produced: 2
Specifications
- Configuration
  - Whyte: 0-6-0T
- Gauge: 2 ft 6 in (762 mm)
- Driver dia.: 2 ft 9 in (0.838 m)
- Loco weight: 19 long tons 18 cwt (44,600 lb or 20.2 t) (22.3 short tons)
- Boiler pressure: 150 lbf/in^{2} (1.03 MPa)
- Cylinders: Two, outside
- Cylinder size: 11 1/2 in × 16 in (292 mm × 406 mm)
Performance figures
- Tractive effort: 8,175 lbf (36.36 kN)
Career
- Operators: Cambrian Railways; Great Western Railway; British Railways; Welshpool and Llanfair Light Railway
- Numbers: CAM: 1–2; GWR/BR: 822–823; W&LLR: 1–2
- Disposition: Both preserved and still in service

Welshpool and Llanfair Light Railway No. 1 The Earl and No. 2 Countess are narrow gauge steam locomotives. They were built by Beyer Peacock & Co. Ltd. at the Gorton Foundry, Manchester in 1902. They were delivered new to the Welshpool and Llanfair Light Railway in 1902, as No.1 The Earl and No.2 The Countess, where they continue to run today.

== History ==
=== Original Operations ===
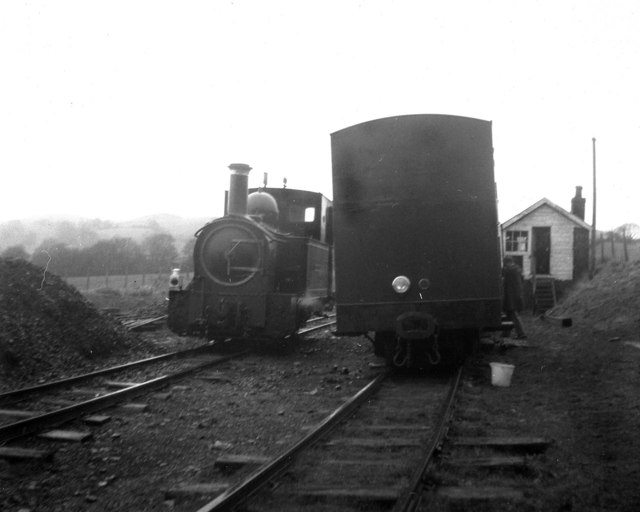
Countess at Castle Caereinion a few days after re-opening

The 2 ft 6 in (762 mm) gauge Welshpool and Llanfair Light Railway was opened on 4 April 1903 to aid economic development in a remote area, never making a profit. It was originally operated by the Cambrian Railways, connecting with it at the former Oswestry and Newtown Railway station in the town of Welshpool. The line was built through difficult country, having a great number of curves in order to reach the summit of 600 ft (180 m). This meant that the engines had to be built to a compact and sturdy design capable of handling trains on the steep gradients.

The engines built to these specifications were No.1 The Earl and No.2 The Countess. They were both delivered new, to the Welshpool and Llanfair Light Railway.

The locomotives were named in honour of the Earl and Countess of Powys as the Earl did much to support the construction of the railway. In the Great Western era, The Countess had its name shortened to Countess.

The Earl and Countess ran the line from 1903 until closure of the railway in 1956. The engines were overhauled at Oswestry Works and were sent there on closure of the railway.

=== Preservation ===
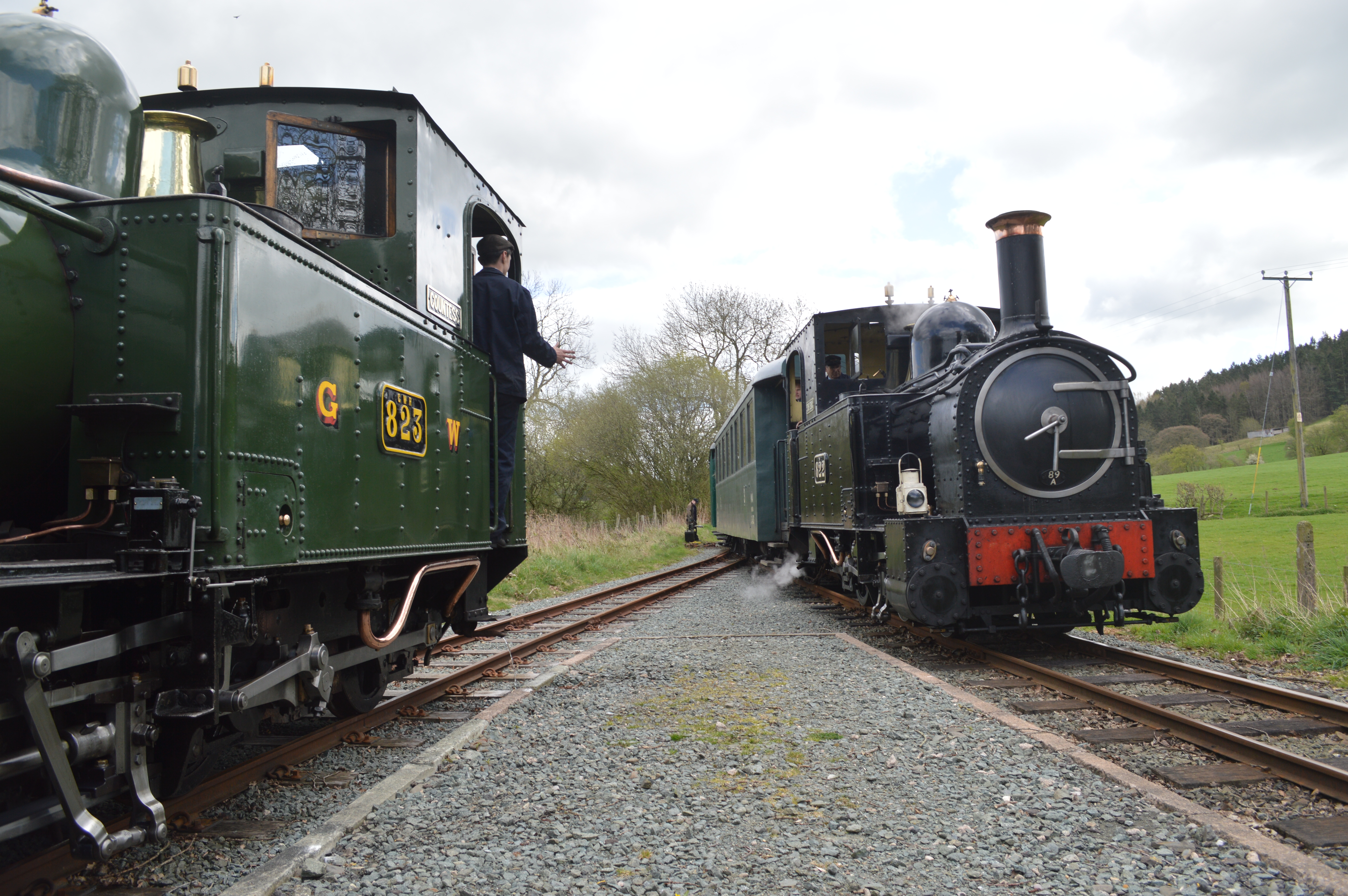
Trains hauled by Countess and The Earl passing at Cyfronydd

By 1959, negotiations had begun with British Railways and the Welshpool and Llanfair Light Railway Preservation Company had leased the line from British Railways by the end of 1962. On 28 July 1961, The Earl returned after storage and overhaul at Oswestry Works, with Countess following not long after. They have continued to work on the line ever since.

== Design ==
The two locomotives are almost identical 0-6-0T engines with side tanks and Walschaerts valve gear.

During their lifetime they have had many modifications, particularly after the takeover of the Great Western. During this period they were fitted with a larger cab, handles on the smokebox door, rather than the original wheel, a larger dome, a much larger and more sophisticated safety valve and two different funnels. They were painted in Great Western green.

When taken over by British Railways, their shunting bells and chopper couplings were removed, and were repainted black.

From 1997 to 2001, the locomotives were fully overhauled at Llanfair, which included the fitting of new boilers and cylinders.

They are currently the same design as the BR era, but have been worn different liveries in preservation. Currently, The Earl is BR condition and Countess in Great Western livery.
