= Welshpool Seven Stars Halt railway station =

Former railway station in Wales

Seven Stars Halt railway station was located in the streets of Welshpool on the corner of Union Street. Seven Stars was an unstaffed request halt on the narrow gauge Welshpool and Llanfair Light Railway. It had a single ground level platform on the single track line, a name board, a sign warning passengers not to board until the train had stopped and a lean-to waiting shelter with a fence.

Opened as Welshpool Seven Stars on 6 April 1903 it was named after a pub of that name that had been demolished in 1901 to create space for the railway. Seven Stars was closed to passengers on 9 February 1931 by the Great Western Railway. and the line closed completely on 3 November 1956. The original Welshpool Raven Square was the next station on the line towards Llanfair Caereinion and the line's station at Welshpool was the previous one.

== Notes ==
Preceding station	Disused railways	Following station
Welshpool; Line and station closed	Great Western Railway; Welshpool and Llanfair Railway	Welshpool Raven Square; Line closed, station open
