= Golfa railway station =

Disused railway station in Golfa, Powys

Golfa

General information
- Location: Golfa, Powys; Wales
- Coordinates: 52.5776°N 3.5445°W
- Grid reference: SN954988

Other information
- Status: Disused

History
- Original company: Cambrian Railways
- Pre-grouping: Cambrian Railways
- Post-grouping: Great Western Railway

Key dates
- 6 April 1903: Opened
- 9 February 1931: Closed
- 18 July 1981: Reopened
- 2015: closed
Location

Golfa railway station is a preserved station that serves the area of Golfa, Powys, Wales, on the Welshpool and Llanfair Light Railway.

== History ==
The station opened on 6 April 1903 by the Cambrian Railways. It was a request stop. It was known as The Golfa in the Montgomeryshire Echo. It closed to passengers on 9 February 1931 but reopened as a preserved station on 18 July 1981. The station was closed by 2015 and all trace of its existence has been removed.

Preceding station	Historical railways	Following station
Welshpool Raven Square	Cambrian Railways; Welshpool and Llanfair Light Railway	Sylfaen
