= Castle Caereinion =

Village and community in Powys, Wales

Castle Caereinion: Welsh: Castell Caereinion
- Location within Powys
- Population: 592 (2011)
- OS grid reference: SJ163055
- Principal area: Powys
- Preserved county: Powys
- Country: Wales
- Sovereign state: United Kingdom
- Post town: WELSHPOOL
- Postcode district: SY21
- Dialling code: 01938
- Police: Dyfed-Powys
- Fire: Mid and West Wales
- Ambulance: Welsh
- UK Parliament: Montgomeryshire and Glyndŵr
- Senedd Cymru – Welsh Parliament: Montgomeryshire
- List of places UK Wales Powys 52.644502°N 3.241712°W Community map: Map of the community

Castle Caereinion (Welsh: Castell Caereinion) is a small village and community in Montgomeryshire, Powys, Wales, upon the River Banwy, around 8 miles west of Welshpool, and 4 miles east of Llanfair Caereinion.

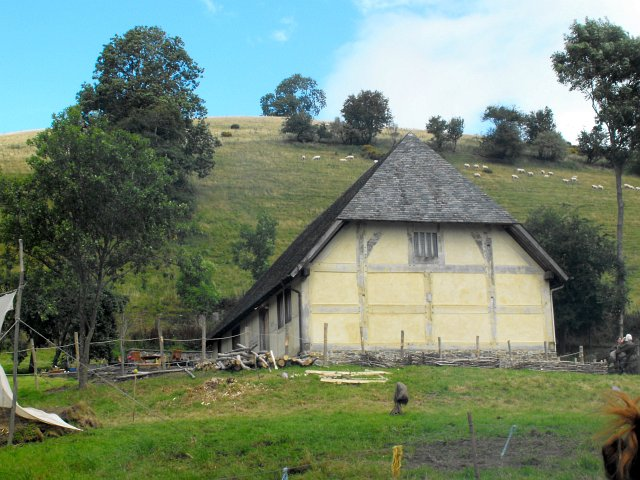
Tŷ Mawr, Castle Caereinion

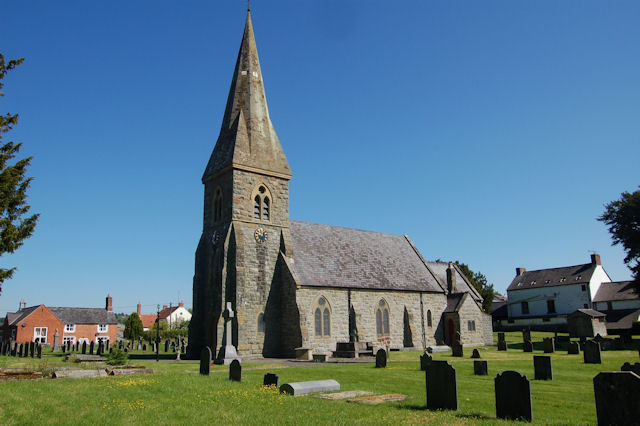
St Garmon Church, Castle Caereinion

In 2011 the Powys County Council ward had a population of 1,810. The community had a population of 592. Castle Caereinion railway station is on the Welshpool and Llanfair Light Railway. The community includes the hamlet of Cyfronydd.

The village is named after an ancient castle. The castle was built in 1156 by Madog ap Maredudd. Madog's nephew Owain Cyfeiliog swore allegiance to the English, Owain Gwynedd took the castle from him and destroyed it in about 1167. It has been suggested that a mound in the churchyard of St Garmon's is the remains of the earthwork castle. This mound is known as Twmpath Garmon, so it could be a preaching mound (as in Llanfechain). The most recent view is that the mound does not appear motte-like and a survey in 2002 failed to find a surrounding ditch.

Tŷ Mawr, a listed Grade I timber-framed house, is in Trefnant within the parish of Castle Caereinion, this house represents an important surviving medieval hall house built for gentry, which dendrochronological evidence suggests was built around 1490, The house was restored in 1997–1998 and is again being used as a home.

== St Garmon’s Church ==
Part of the Church in Wales, the church of St Garmon was completely rebuilt in the perpendicular gothic style in 1866 with additions in 1874. Built with slate roof from green squared rubble stone dressed with limestone, it consists of a porch, nave, chancel, and vestry with a broach-spire tower.

Its predecessor was 15th century. Some of the fittings from the earlier church survive, mostly from the 18th century. St Garmon's was not an important ecclesiastical centre, being classed as a chapel in 1254.
