= Banwy =

- Principal area: Powys
- Preserved county: Powys
- Country: Wales
- Sovereign state: United Kingdom
- Post town: WELSHPOOL
- Postcode district: SY21
- Dialling code: 01938
- Police: Dyfed-Powys
- Fire: Mid and West Wales
- Ambulance: Welsh
- UK Parliament: Montgomeryshire and Glyndŵr
- Senedd Cymru – Welsh Parliament: Montgomeryshire
- List of places UK Wales Powys 52.71233°N 3.50665°W Map of the community

Banwy is a community in northwest Montgomeryshire, Powys, Wales, named after the River Banwy and also called Banw in Welsh.

== Geography ==
The community includes the villages of Llangadfan and Foel. Foel was previously the main settlement in the parish of Garthbeibio. It is a sparsely populated area centred on the village of Llangadfan and extending west for some 10 km to the boundary with Gwynedd. It is located along the upper River Banwy valley, on either side of the A458 road between Llanfair Caereinion and Mallwyd.

The population according to the 2011 UK census was 605. In 2005, the population was 534.

== History ==
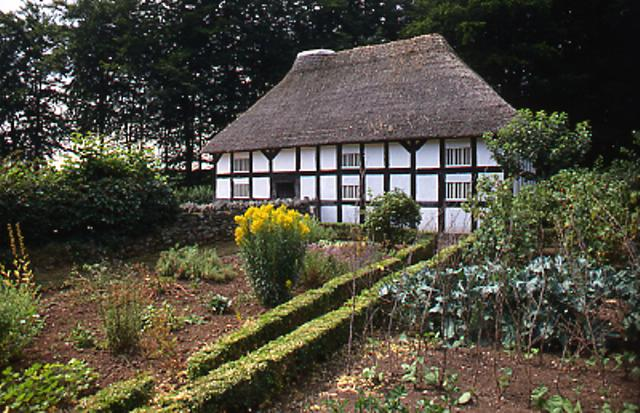
Abernodwydd Farmhouse, moved to St Fagans National Museum of History

Abernodwydd Farmhouse, a wooden-framed farmhouse built in 1678 from the Llangadfan was reassembled at the St Fagans National Museum of History. Banwy was the site of Ffridd y Castell, or Ffriddycastell. The site is located 6 miles (9.7 km) southwest of Llangadfan.

=== 1977 F-111 crash ===
At Foel at 9.55pm on Monday 31 October 1977, a F-111 E crashed, part of the 79th Tactical Fighter Squadron.

- Air Flight Commander, Capt John James Sweeney (31 March 1948 - October 1977), aged 29, from Amsterdam, Ohio, he left Ohio State University College of Engineering in 1970
- Weapon Systems Officer, Capt William Weston Smart (26 May 1942 - October 1977), aged 35, from Pinellas County, Florida
