= Welshpool and Llanfair Light Railway steam locomotive number 19 =

Number 19
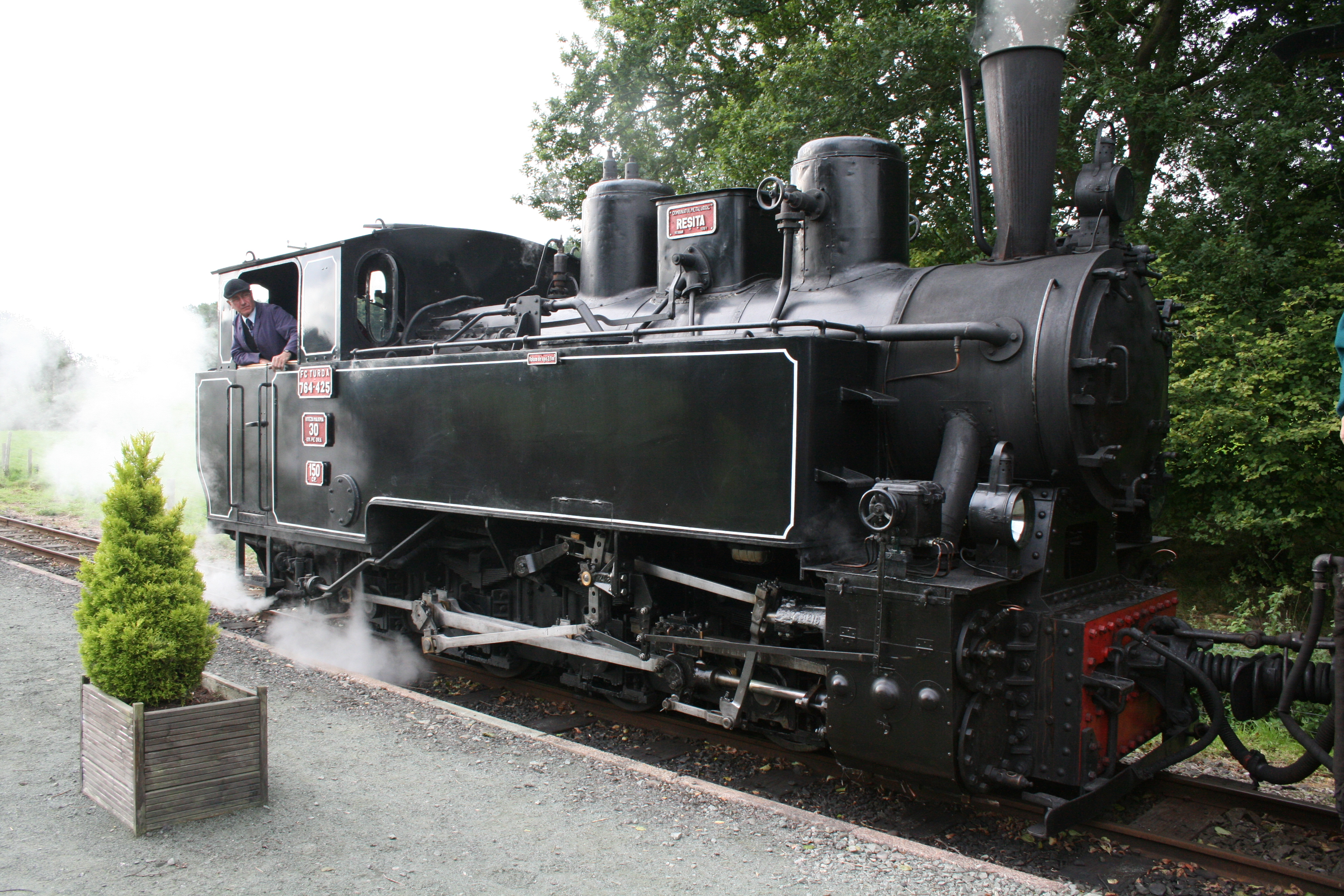
- No. 19 at Cyfronydd, W&LLR
Type and origin
- Power type: Steam
- Builder: Uzinele de Fier și Domeniile din Reșița S.A.
- Serial number: 1681
- Build date: 1954
Specifications
- Configuration
  - Whyte: 0-8-0T
- Gauge: 2 ft 6 in (762 mm)
- Loco weight: 24 tonnes
- Fuel type: Coal
Performance figures
- Maximum speed: 30 km/h (19 mph)
Career
- Operators: W&LLR and Tankodrom Milovice
- Numbers: 764.425
- Delivered: 2007-06-20 (W&LLR); 2016-07-20 (Tankodrom)
- Disposition: In service

Welshpool and Llanfair Light Railway (W&LLR) steam locomotive number 19 was built in 1954 by Uzinele de Fier și Domeniile din Reșița S.A. (English: Iron Works in Reșița and Domenille limited company) based in Reșița (Romania). It was imported to the UK in 2007 having been restored to working condition at Remarul 16 Februarie Locomotive Works in Cluj-Napoca, Romania. Prior to restoration the locomotive had been stored at Crișcior.

The locomotive (and its sister W&LLR 18) are articulated using the Klien-Lindner system. Articulation allows the locomotives to negotiate much tighter curves than their equivalent rigid frame 0-8-0 locomotive could. In Romania the locomotives operated on the 760 mm (2 ft 5 15/16 in) network. The W&LLR 2 ft 6 in (762 mm) is 2 mm wider.

The locomotive originally saw service on the Romanian Forest Railways, hauling timber. It was later sold to FC Turda, a cement works.

Numbered as FC Turda 764.425 and painted in a black livery, the locomotive was regularly used to haul trains on the W&LLR. During 2011 the locomotive was taken out of service for an extensive overhaul. The overhaul was completed in time for the 2012 gala but in June 2013 the locomotive sheared the RHS driving axle crank web leaving Welshpool. Following this serious failure the locomotive was stored.

In June 2016 764.425 was sold and after overhaul by Calea Ferata Ingusta in Romania now works on a tourist railway at the Tankodrom military theme park at Milovice in the Czech Republic.

== W&LLR number 18 ==
The W&LLR also possessed Reşiţa 1679 (CFF 764.423). This loco was acquired from the defunct Ystwith Railway, for which it had previously been imported from Romania. During its stay at the W&LLR the locomotive was a source of spares for No. 19.

Along with 764.425, 764.423 was sold back to Calea Ferata Ingusta in Romania in June 2016 where it was rebuilt with new tanks and cab.
