= Sylfaen =

Sylfaen [ˈsəlvɑːɨn] is a Welsh word meaning foundation. It may refer to:

- Sylfaen (typeface), a serif font family
- Sylfaen railway station, in Sylfaen, Powys, Wales
  - Sylfaen, Powys, the town where the station is located
