= Castle Caereinion railway station =

Railway station in Powys, Wales

Castle Caereinion
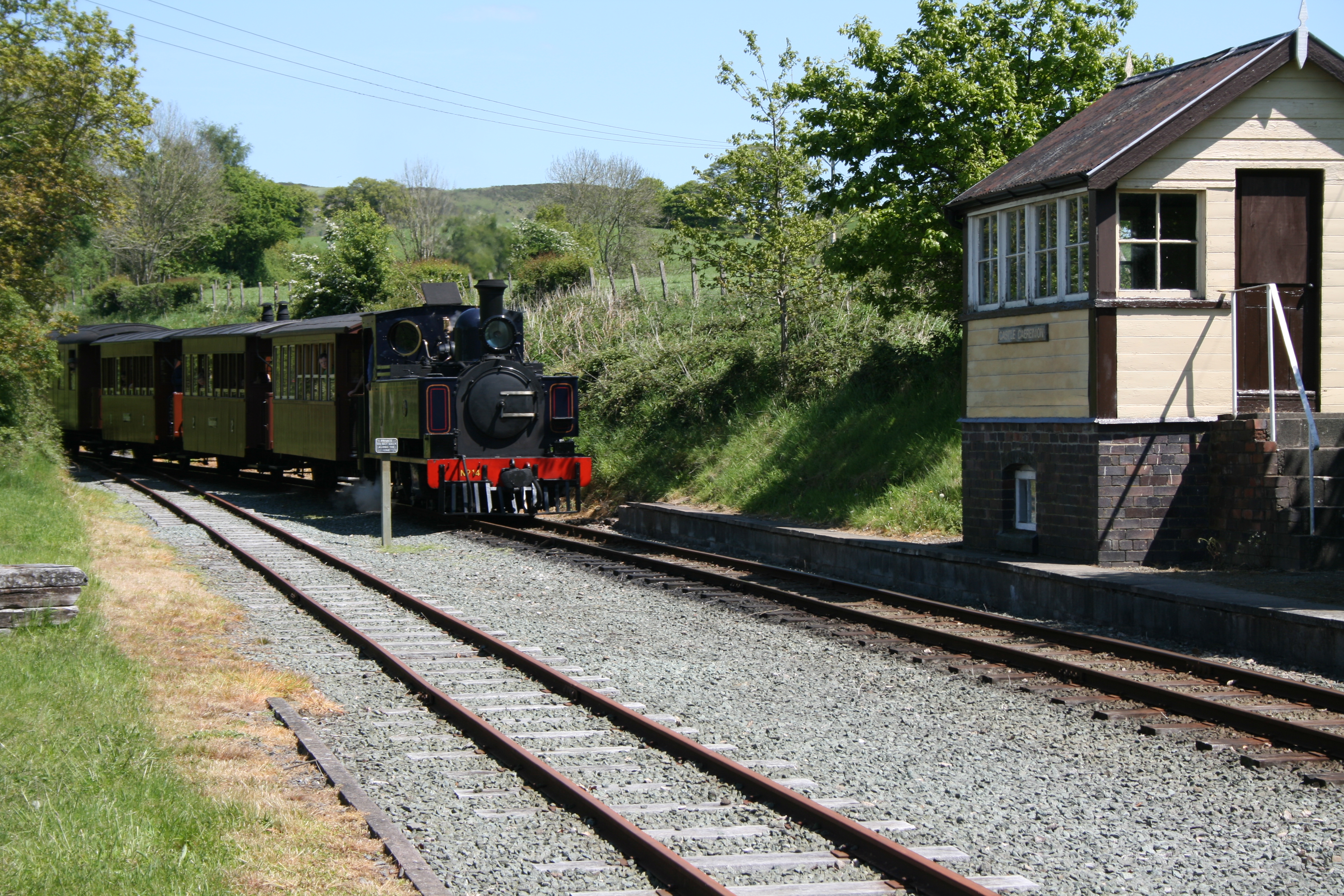
- Hunslet 2-6-2T No. 14 arrives at Castle Caereinion, 2009.

General information
- Location: Castle Caereinion, Powys; Wales
- Coordinates: 52.644600°N 3.241075°W
- Grid reference: SJ161059
- System: Station on heritage railway
- Owner: Welshpool and Llanfair Light Railway
- Manager: Welshpool and Llanfair Light Railway
- Platforms: 2

Key dates
- 6 April 1903: opened
- 9 February 1931: closed for passengers
- 3 November 1956: closed completely
- 6 April 1963: reopened
- 28 September 1964: closed
- 14 August 1965: opened
Location

Castle Caereinion railway station is a railway station on the 2 ft 6 in (762 mm) narrow gauge Welshpool and Llanfair Light Railway in Mid Wales. It serves the nearby village of Castle Caereinion and lies 3 3/4 miles (6.0 km) from the Welshpool Raven Square terminus. The station was opened on 6 April 1903.

The station was an important intermediate stop and had a signal box that still survives. The level crossing over the B4385 has been automated since 2015. The Great Western Railway withdrew passenger services on 9 February 1931. and the line closed completely on 3 November 1956. By 1963 the line had a passenger service restored by the Welshpool and Llanfair Railway. The station officially reopened on 6 April 1963, however due to damage caused by floods to the Banwy Bridge it was closed between 28 September 1964 and 14 August 1965.

Two platforms are present and a passing loop that sees occasional use. The main platform is raised whilst the other is at ground level.

Preceding station	Heritage railways	Following station
Cyfronydd towards Llanfair Caereinion	Welshpool & Llanfair Light Railway	Sylfaen towards Welshpool Raven Square
