= Garthbeibio =

Former parish in Powys, Wales

Coordinates: 52.6957°N 3.4991°W

- Location within Powys
- Community: Banwy
- Principal area: Powys
- Preserved county: Powys
- Country: Wales
- Sovereign state: United Kingdom
- Police: Dyfed-Powys
- Fire: Mid and West Wales
- Ambulance: Welsh
- UK Parliament: Montgomeryshire and Glyndŵr
- Senedd Cymru – Welsh Parliament: Montgomeryshire

Garthbeibio is a former civil parish and community in Powys, Wales, about 3km north-west of Llangadfan. On 1 April 1987 the community was abolished, and today the area is part of Banwy. At the 1971 census, the last before becoming a community in 1974, the civil parish had a population of 75.

The main village in Garthbeibio is Foel. About half a mile west of Foel is St Tydecho's Church, the former parish church of Garthbeibio. It is believed that a church has been located there since the 6th century, but the current church dates from the 15th or early 16th century.

In 1906 the parish was the location of the Garthbeibio murders. Rowland Llywarch (also spelt Roland) was tried for the murder of the elderly couple John and Mary Evans in Foel on 10 March 1906. Llywarch was visiting family in the area, he was from Montgomery but lived in London. Two days after the murders he was arrested in nearby Llanfihangel. Three months later the case was put to trial, and after two days the verdict was that Llywarch was guilty of "wilful murder", to which he loudly shouted "I am not guilty, you liars."
