= Erfyl =

Erfyl (also known as Eurfyl, among other names) was a female Welsh virgin. A church in Llanerfyl, Powys, where her grave is thought to be located, has been dedicated to her. A holy well in her name was formerly located nearby.

== History ==
Records of the feast day of the virgin Saint Erfyl first appear in Wales during the 15th century, recorded as 6 July. Her name may have changed over time, as when listed in the 16th century Llanstephan MS 47B manuscript, her name appears as Gwerfyl. In a manuscript written in 1508, Additional MS 12.913, a "Urvul a Gwenvul" is listed on the same day. Further similar names have been attributed to her over the years, including Eurfyl, Eurful, Erful, Urful, Urfyl and Yrfyl.

A church in Llanerfyl, Powys is dedicated to Saint Erfyl, and is supposed to be her place of burial. She has been attributed as a daughter of Padarn and a cousin of Cadfan, though this is a misreading of an inscribed stone, referred to as her gravestone, in the churchyard. The church holds a reliquary of Erfyl and within the grounds there are the remains of a wooden shrine. A yew tree stands in the churchyard, which has had the trunk divided into four. Tradition states that it grew from Erfyl's staff.

A holy well devoted to Erfyl formerly stood 400 feet (120 m) away from the church. The water was attributed with curing ability, and was previously used as baptismal water in the church. It became a tradition for the children of the surrounding area to drink the water with sugar added on Easter Mondays.
