= Eleri Mills =

Welsh artist (born 1955)

- Born: 1955 (age 70–71); Llangadfan
- Education: Manchester Polytechnic
- Website: elerimills.co.uk

Eleri Mills (born 1955) is a Welsh painter.

== Life ==
Mills was born in Llangadfan in Powys, and gained a B.A. in Art and Design from Manchester Polytechnic. She was elected to the Royal Cambrian Academy in 2000 and in 2012 was an artist-in-residence at Columbia University in New York.
