= Sylfaen railway station =

Railway station in Powys, Wales

Sylfaen
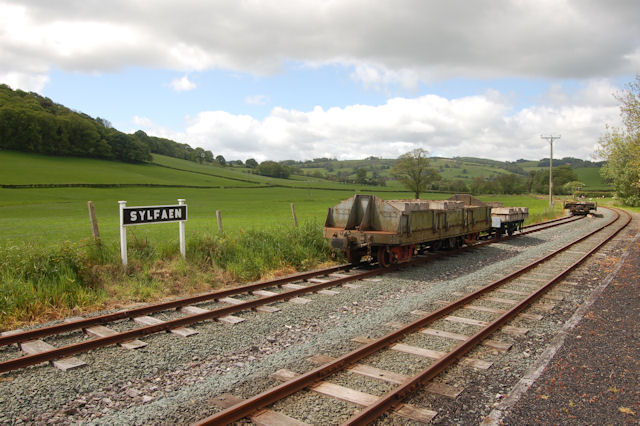

General information
- Location: Sylfaen, Powys; Wales
- Coordinates: 52.649362°N 3.219703°W
- Grid reference: SJ176064
- System: Station on heritage railway
- Owner: Welshpool and Llanfair Light Railway
- Manager: Welshpool and Llanfair Light Railway
- Platforms: 1

Key dates
- 1904: opened
- 9 February 1931: closed
- 1972: reopened
Location

Sylfaen railway station, located in the tiny hamlet of Sylfaen on the A548, is an unstaffed request halt on the narrow gauge Welshpool and Llanfair Light Railway 2 3/4 miles (4.4 km) from the Welshpool Raven Square terminus. It has a short platform and waiting shelter.

Opened as Sylfaen Farm Siding in 1904 it was renamed 'Sylfaen Halt' on 1 February 1913. Sylfaen was closed to passengers on 9 February 1931.

Originally the halt had a short goods siding. Parcels could be left in a box and a special blast on the engine's whistle indicated items to be collected. The Great Western Railway withdrew passenger services in 1931. and the line closed completely on 3 November 1956.

By 1972 the line had been restored as far as Sylfaen. The station was furbished and provided with a passing loop for the beginning of the 2024 season.

== Notes ==
Preceding station	Heritage railways	Following station
Castle Caereinion towards Llanfair Caereinion	Welshpool & Llanfair Light Railway	Welshpool Raven Square Terminus
