= Llangadfan =

Coordinates: 52.681483°N 3.462925°W

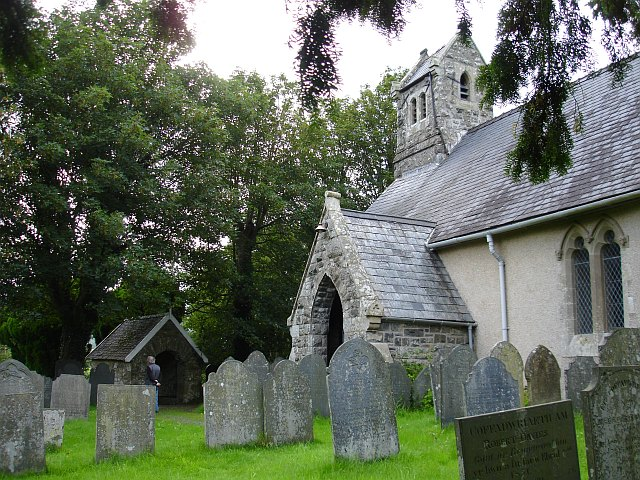
- St Cadfan's church

- Location within Powys
- Population: (2001)
- OS grid reference: SJ041102
- Community: Banwy
- Principal area: Powys
- Preserved county: Powys
- Country: Wales
- Sovereign state: United Kingdom
- Post town: WELSHPOOL
- Postcode district: SY21
- Dialling code: 01938
- Police: Dyfed-Powys
- Fire: Mid and West Wales
- Ambulance: Welsh
- UK Parliament: Montgomeryshire and Glyndŵr
- Senedd Cymru – Welsh Parliament: Montgomeryshire

Llangadfan is a small village in Powys, Wales, based in the community of Banwy. The village lies on the A458 between Foel and Llanerfyl, 12 kilometres (7.5 mi) from Llanwddyn. Dyfnant Forest is located nearby. The village is said to be known for its country dances.

Until 1986 Llangadfan was a community itself. It is now a part of the community of Banwy.

== Geography ==
Llangadfan is a village (area of 16,929 acres (6,851 ha)) and a parish, which lies on the banks of the River Vyrnwy and extends into the Banwy River and Nant-yn-Eira stream. Llanfyllin railway station (now closed) is 19.2 km (11.9 mi) to its north-east and Llanfair is 8.8 km (5.5 mi) away to its east-south-east. The pub here is known as "Cann Office Hotel".

=== Climate ===
The lowest average temperature recorded is 2 °C (36 °F) in January and the average maximum is 18 °C (64 °F) during August. The average annual rainfall is 140.07 centimetres (55.15 in) with a maximum monthly average of 15.89 centimetres (6.26 in) in December and lowest average of 9.22 centimetres (3.63 in) in June.

== Notable landmarks ==
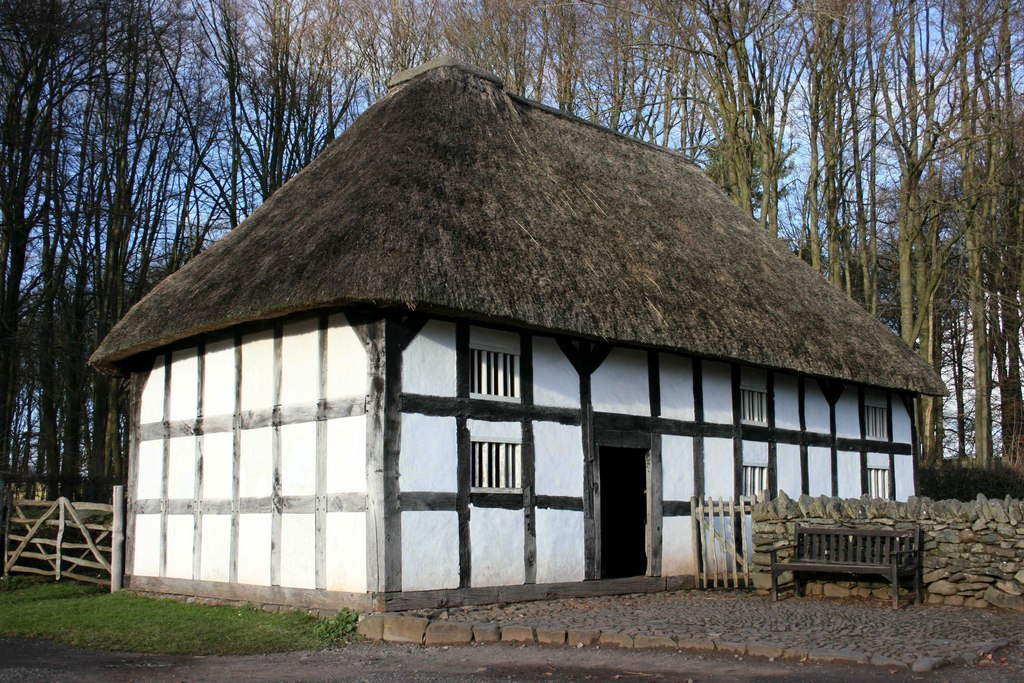
Abernodwydd, now located in St Fagans Museum.

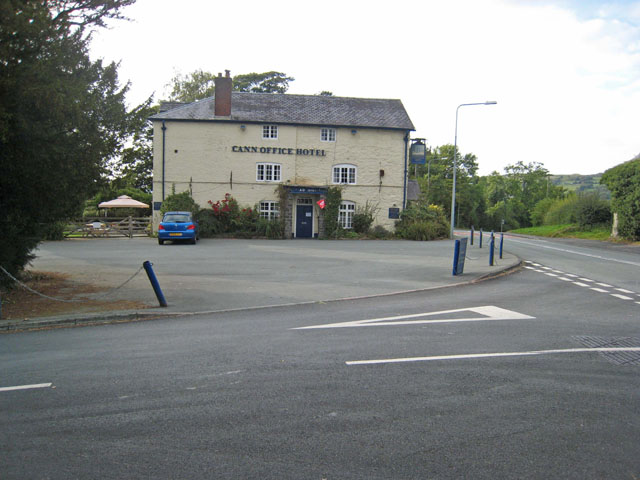
Cann Office Hotel

Llangadfan is home to St Cadfan's church, a medieval church whose original features have been obscured by a 19th century restoration. The church was originally said to have been established by Saint Cadfan (who had to flee under pressure from Franks with his companions) somewhere between 510 and 515, shortly before he departed and founded a monastery on Bardsey Island where he served as its abbot from 516 to 542. This church was the seat of the Parish of Llangadfan for centuries, then being part of the County of Montgomeryshire.

Features of St Cadfan's church

St Cadfan's church, in the Diocese of St Asaph, located 14 miles to the west of Welshpool, originally of 15th century medieval vintage, was restored in 1867–68. It has been built over a raised sub-circular churchyard which was expanded in 1910 in the western direction. It has a small single chamber (a nave and chancel) with an east facing window in east west layout. While the porch (southern direction), vestry (in the northern direction), chancel arch, new windows, and bell turret ( on the west, over the nave) belong to the nineteenth century restoration, a stoup and a few other older structures are still visible. Stone masonry with square blocks of greyish shale siltstone is irregularly coursed in the porch, the vestry and the bell turret and fully plastered. The roof (gabled to the east and west) is made of slates with black ceramic red ridge tiles with a cross finial to chancel. Peaked arches with louver boards are provided on the Northern and southern sides. The north wall has three windows, "two to the nave, one to the chancel; each has a two-centred arch with two trefoiled two-centred lights of grey freestone; and continuous hoodmoulds ending in head stops and having a central stop as well."

Cobblestone floor is provided inside the church. The roof is made of timber where rafters and purlins are exposed. The north and south walls are fitted with wooden benches fixed over stone plinths. The main entrance to the church is through a pair of wrought iron gates set in stone pillars in the north-west wall, which is the main entrance. Entry to the church is also through a gravelled path from the lychgate. The southern wall has stone steps which lead to Tyn-llan (a public house in the past).

The churchyard is closed within a boundary wall except the extended part of western end of the church. There is an earthen bank of 1 m height, which delimits the earlier boundary of the church where there is a lychgate made of stone. The churchyard has plantation of many trees of yews, sycamores and ashes; some are dated to 1732.

=== Other buildings ===
One of the buildings of Llangadfan, Abernodwydd, a timber-framed house originally built in 1678, has been removed and re-erected at the St Fagans National History Museum, near Cardiff. In 1849, the village was said to contain a mansion and 1931 acres of land.

The Cann Office Hotel dates back to at least the 17th century when it was a post office known as the "Can Office". It later became an inn, and the chief village pub and restaurant.

Some interesting ancient artefacts have been unearthed in the Llangadfan area, including a stone implement unearthed during a drain maintenance job in August 1931 and a bronze palstave which was discovered in the spring of 1833 in the second field from Parc farmhouse.

== Notable people ==
Famous residents of the village include:

- Gruffudd Llwyd (c.1380–c.1420), medieval poet.
- William Jones (1726–1795), Welsh poet, physician and radical.
- David Bynner (1838–1866), a local educator and publisher of a small arrangement of music; born and died in the village.
- John Cadvan Davies (1846–1923) Wesleyan Methodist Minister, poet and Archdruid as 'Cadvan'; born in Yr Allt Farm.
- Shani Rhys James MBE (born 1953), painter, based in the village.
- Eleri Mills (born 1955), a Welsh painter.
