= River Banwy =

River in Powys, Wales

Coordinates: 52°41′36″N 3°16′09″W

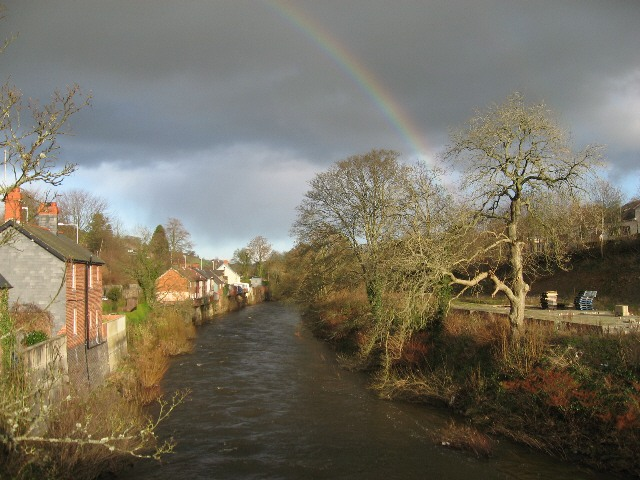
River Banwy at Llanfair Caereinion

The River Banwy is a river about 19 miles (31 km) long in Powys, Wales. It is a tributary of the River Vyrnwy.

The Banwy rises in the hills near the pass which takes the A458 road between Mallwyd and Welshpool. The river is called Nant Cerrig-y-groes at its source near Moel y Llyn. Then flowing east, it joins a number of lesser streams before reaching Pont Twrch near the village of Y Foel, at its confluence with the river Twrch. Two miles further on, it is joined by the river Gam, which flows down from the Nant yr Eira, between Y Foel and Llangadfan.

After flowing past the small village of Llanerfyl the river meanders between hills of moderate altitude to reach a bridge at Llanfair Caereinion. For the last 5 miles (8.0 km) of its course it turns northwards through a narrow valley. 'Yr Hafesb' is its local name here. It passes Mathrafal, the seat and court of the kings of Powys. Its confluence with the Vyrnwy is near Newbridge.
