= Cyfronydd railway station =

Railway station in Cyfronydd, Powys, Wales

Cyfronydd
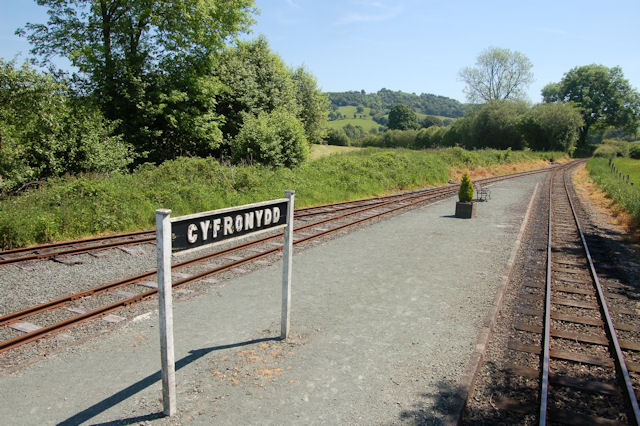
- View of the single island platform in 2009.

General information
- Location: Cyfronydd, Powys; Wales
- Coordinates: 52.6605°N 3.2754°W
- Grid reference: SJ138077
- System: Station on heritage railway
- Owner: Welshpool and Llanfair Light Railway
- Manager: Welshpool and Llanfair Light Railway
- Platforms: 2

Key dates
- 6 April 1903: opened
- 9 February 1931: closed for passengers
- 3 November 1956: closed completely
- 6 April 1963: reopened
Location

Cyfronydd railway station lies 9.2 km (5.7 mi) from Welshpool's Raven Square station on the narrow gauge Welshpool and Llanfair Light Railway in Mid Wales. This is where trains pass each other when a two train service is operating. Passengers are able to alight and join trains here. The station serves the hamlet of Cyfronydd on the main Dolgellau to Welshpool road as well as Cyfronydd Hall.

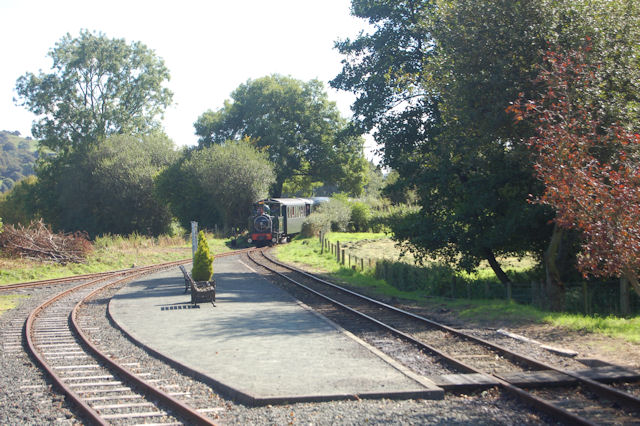
Countess arrives with train at Cyfronydd

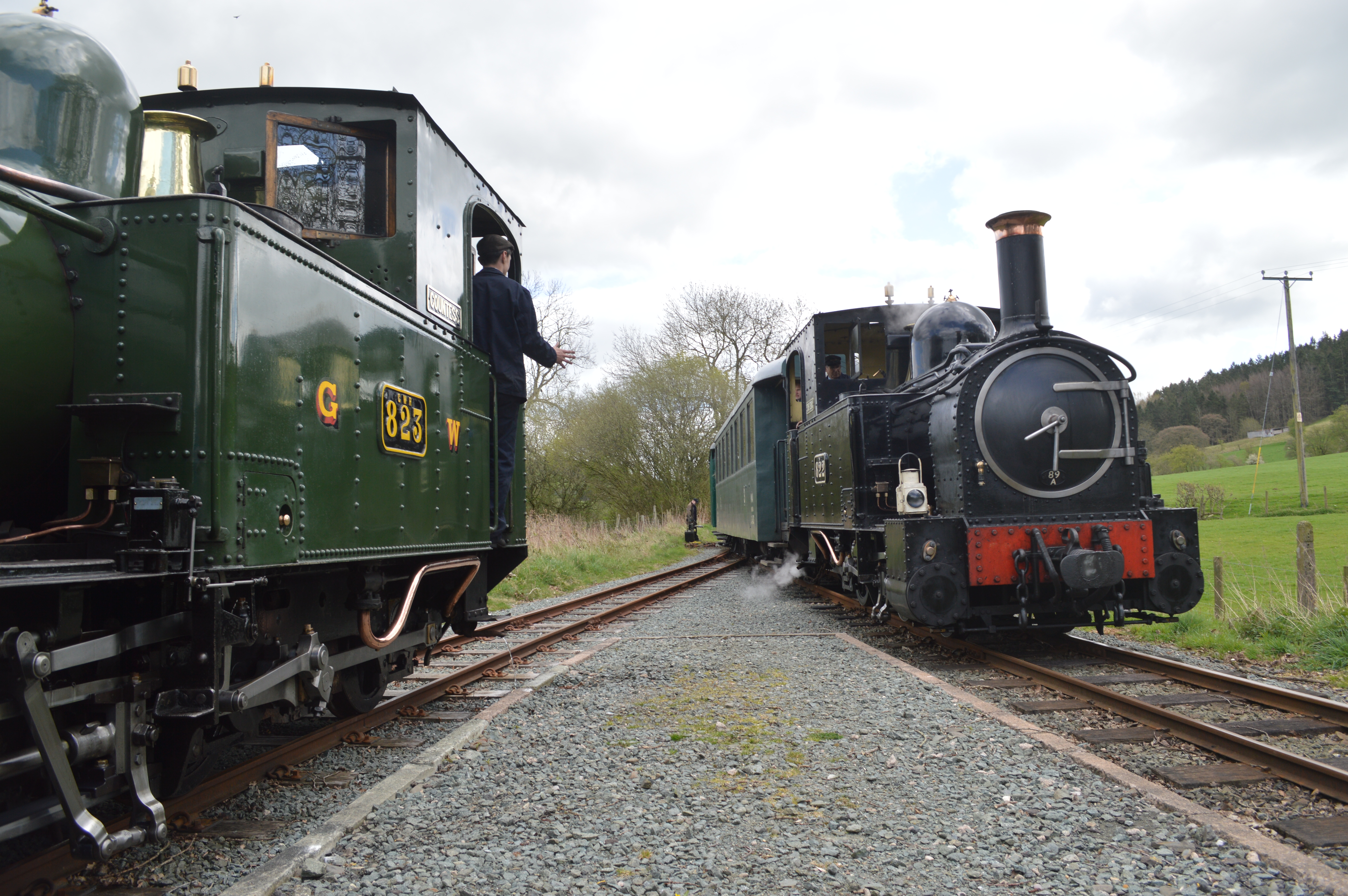
Trains hauled by Countess and The Earl passing at Cyfronydd

Cyfronydd Hall, where former foreign secretary William Hague lives, is nearby.

Opened on 6 April 1903, the station closed to passengers on 9 February 1931. It was the Great Western Railway that withdrew passenger services in 1931; the line closed completely on 3 November 1956.

== Notes ==
Preceding station	Heritage railways	Following station
Heniarth towards Llanfair Caereinion	Welshpool & Llanfair Light Railway	Castle Caereinion towards Welshpool Raven Square
