= Llanerfyl =

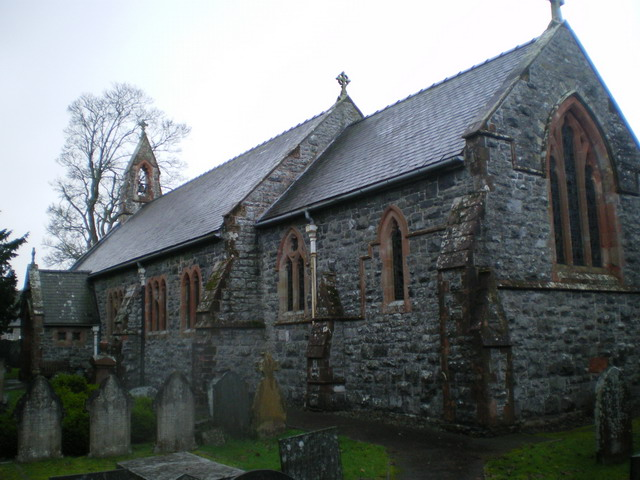
- St Erfyl's church, Llanerfyl

- Location within Powys
- Population: 406 (2011)
- OS grid reference: SJ041130
- Community: Llanerfyl
- Principal area: Powys
- Preserved county: Powys
- Country: Wales
- Sovereign state: United Kingdom
- Post town: WELSHPOOL
- Postcode district: SY21
- Dialling code: 01938
- Police: Dyfed-Powys
- Fire: Mid and West Wales
- Ambulance: Welsh
- UK Parliament: Montgomeryshire and Glyndŵr
- Senedd Cymru – Welsh Parliament: Montgomeryshire
- List of places UK Wales Powys 52.6752415°N 3.419930°W Community map: Map of the community

Llanerfyl is a village and community in Montgomeryshire, Powys, Wales. Located near the River Banwy, the community includes the village of Llanerfyl, several farms and wide tracts of marchland. The southern part of the community includes Cwm Nant yr Eira, which suffered severe depopulation in the 20th century. The 2001 census gives the population of the community as 402, increasing slightly to 406 at the 2011 Census.

The village contains St Erfyl's church, named after Erfyl, rebuilt in 1870. It contains the remnants of a 15th-century shrine. The circular churchyard has in it a gravestone from either the 5th or 6th century commemorating the death of a young girl, identified locally with Erfyl:

HIC [IN] / TUM(V)LO IAC/IT R[O]STE/ECE FILIA PA/TERNINI / AN(N)IS XIII IN / PA(CE)
('In the grave here lies *Rhostege daughter of Padarn, 13 years, in peace').

== Notable residents ==
- Sir Charles Robert Harington, FRS, (1897–1972), a chemist, synthesised thyroxine.
- Nick Griffin (born 1959), British National Party MEP 2009–2014.
- Siân James (born 1961), a Welsh traditional folk singer and harpist
