= Llanfair Caereinion railway station =

Railway station in Llanfair Caereinion, Powys, Wales

Llanfair Caereinion
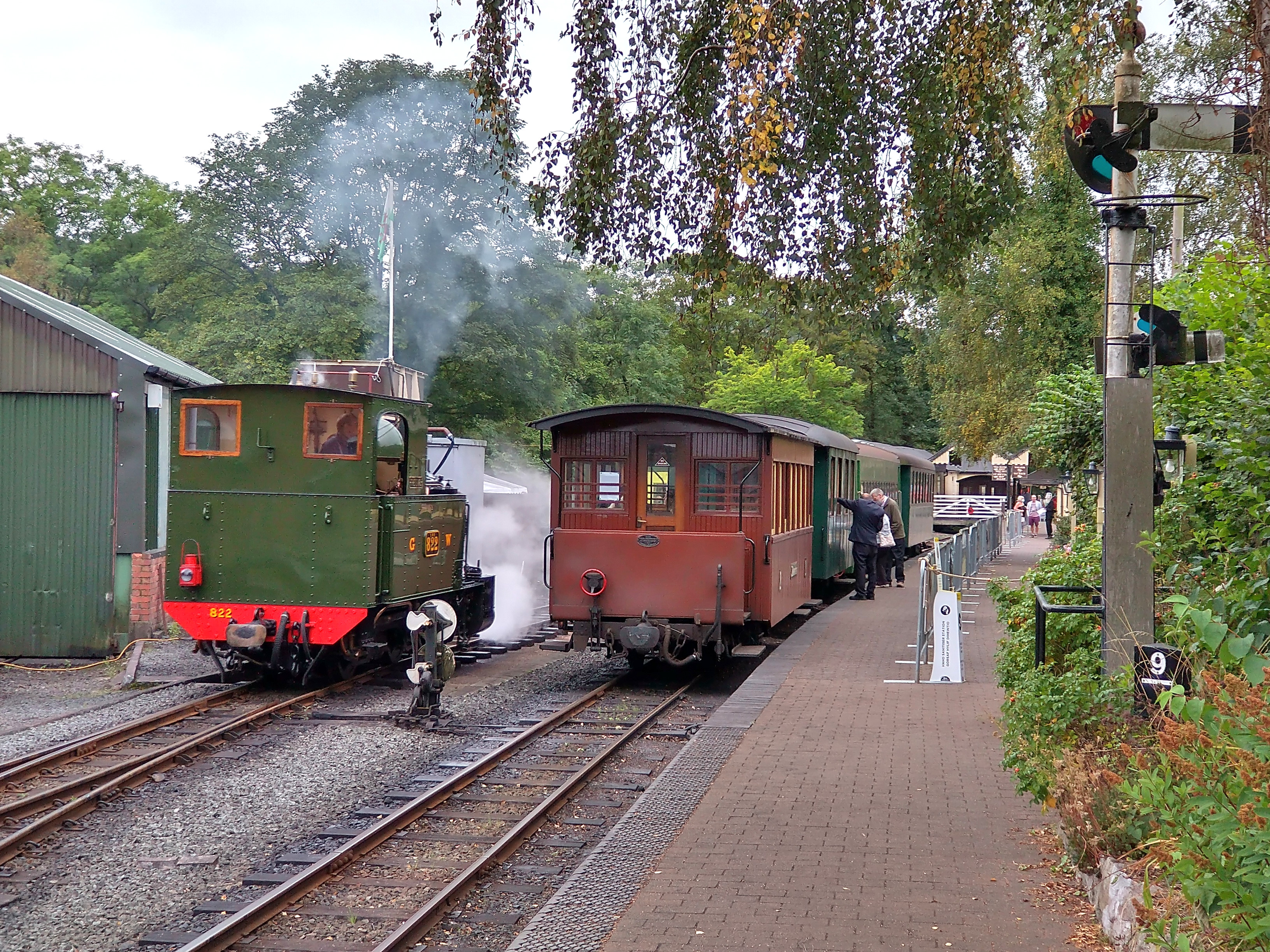
- Station in 2021

General information
- Location: Llanfair Caereinion, Powys; Wales
- Coordinates: 52.651673°N 3.322654°W
- Grid reference: SJ106068
- System: Station on heritage railway
- Owner: Welshpool and Llanfair Light Railway
- Manager: Welshpool and Llanfair Light Railway
- Platforms: 1

Key dates
- 6 April 1903: opened
- 9 February 1931: closed for passengers
- 3 November 1956: closed completely
- 6 April 1963: reopened
Location

Llanfair Caereinion railway station located in Llanfair Caereinion is the Western terminus of the 2 ft 6 in (762 mm) narrow gauge Welshpool and Llanfair Light Railway. The locomotive running shed and workshops are located here, along with a tea room and gift shop. The original corrugated iron booking office and waiting room survive and have been restored for use as the registered office of the company.

Llanfair Caereinion station lies 8 miles (13 km) from Welshpool's Raven Square terminus. The station was opened on 6 April 1903. The station stands at 400 feet (120 m) above sea level.

The Great Western Railway withdrew passenger services on 9 February 1931. and the line closed completely on 3 November 1956. By 6 April 1963 the line had a passenger service restored by the Welshpool and Llanfair Railway.

== Notes ==
Preceding station	Heritage railways	Following station
Terminus	Welshpool & Llanfair Light Railway	Heniarth towards Welshpool Raven Square
