= Llanfair Caereinion =

Market town in Powys, Wales

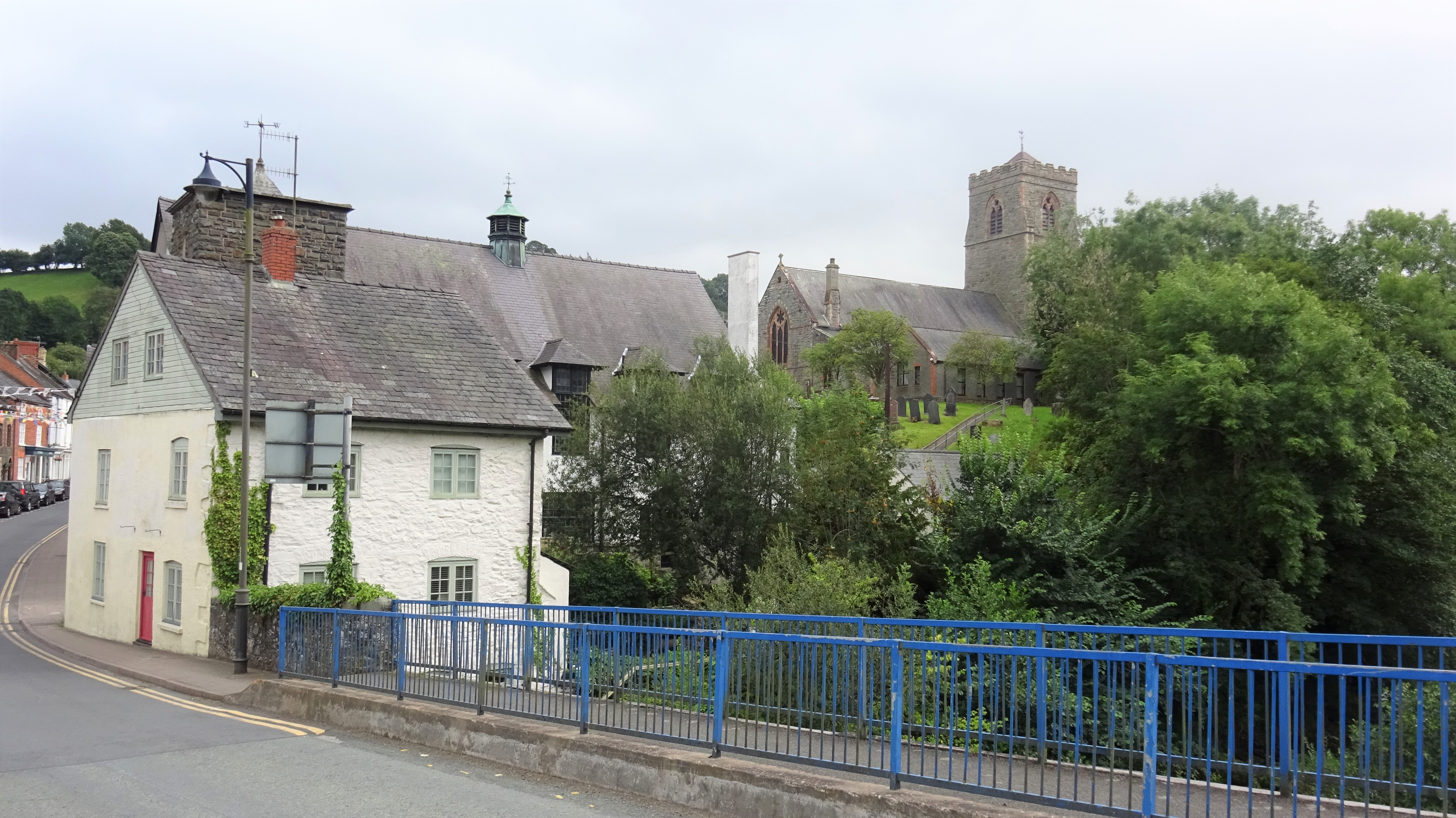
- River Banwy Bridge with St Mary's Church in the distance.

- Location within Powys
- Population: 1,810 (2011)
- OS grid reference: SJ105065
- Principal area: Powys
- Preserved county: Powys
- Country: Wales
- Sovereign state: United Kingdom
- Post town: WELSHPOOL
- Postcode district: SY21
- Dialling code: 01938
- Police: Dyfed-Powys
- Fire: Mid and West Wales
- Ambulance: Welsh
- UK Parliament: Montgomeryshire and Glyndŵr
- Senedd Cymru – Welsh Parliament: Montgomeryshire
- List of places UK Wales Powys 52.64882°N 3.32434°W Community map: Map of the community

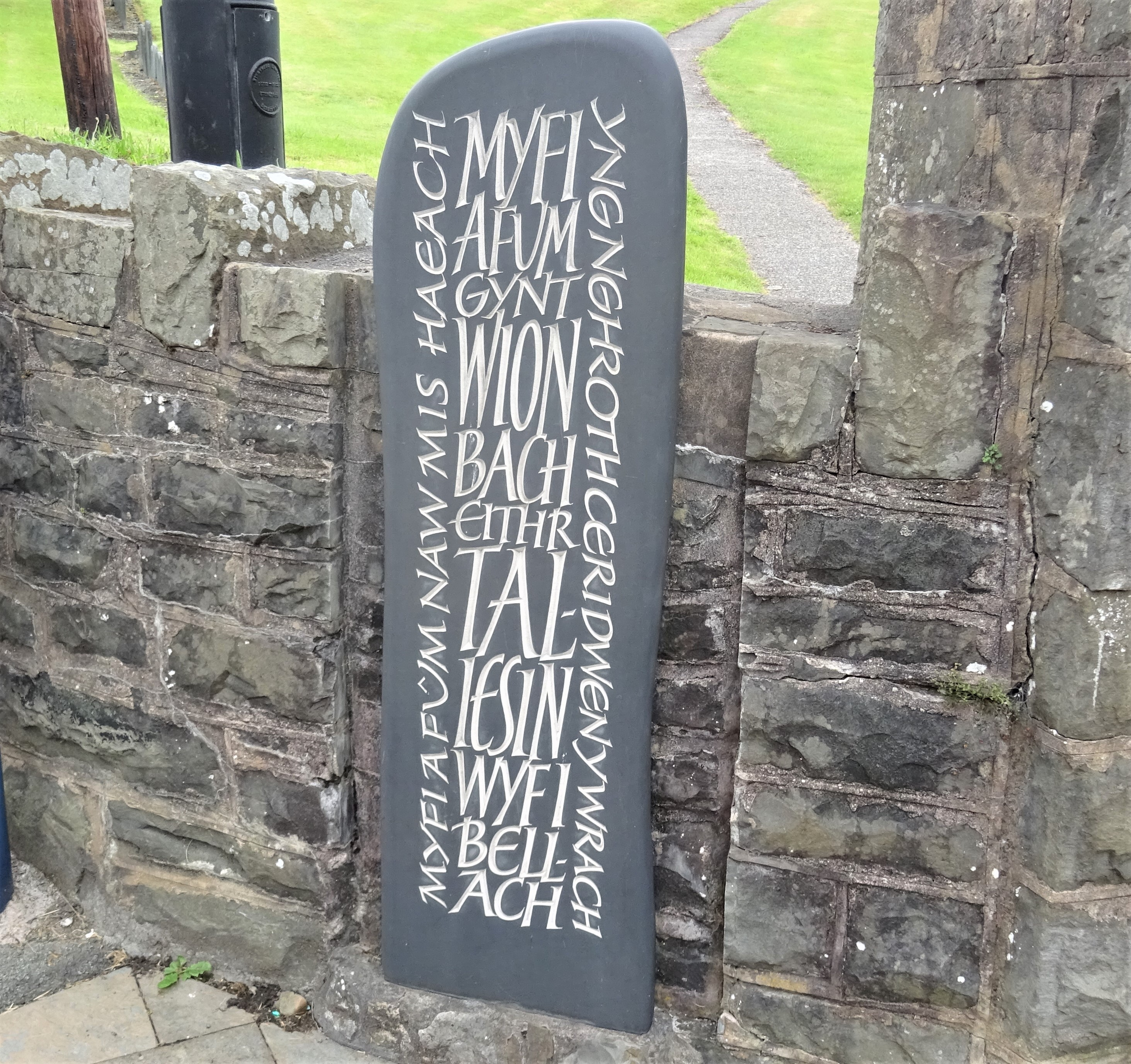
Taliesin Stone, Llanfair Caereinion.

Llanfair Caereinion (Welsh pronunciation) is a market town and community in Montgomeryshire, Powys, Wales upon the River Banwy (also known as the River Einion), around 8 miles west of Welshpool. In 2011 the ward had a population of 1,810; the town itself had a population of 1,055 according to Nomis.

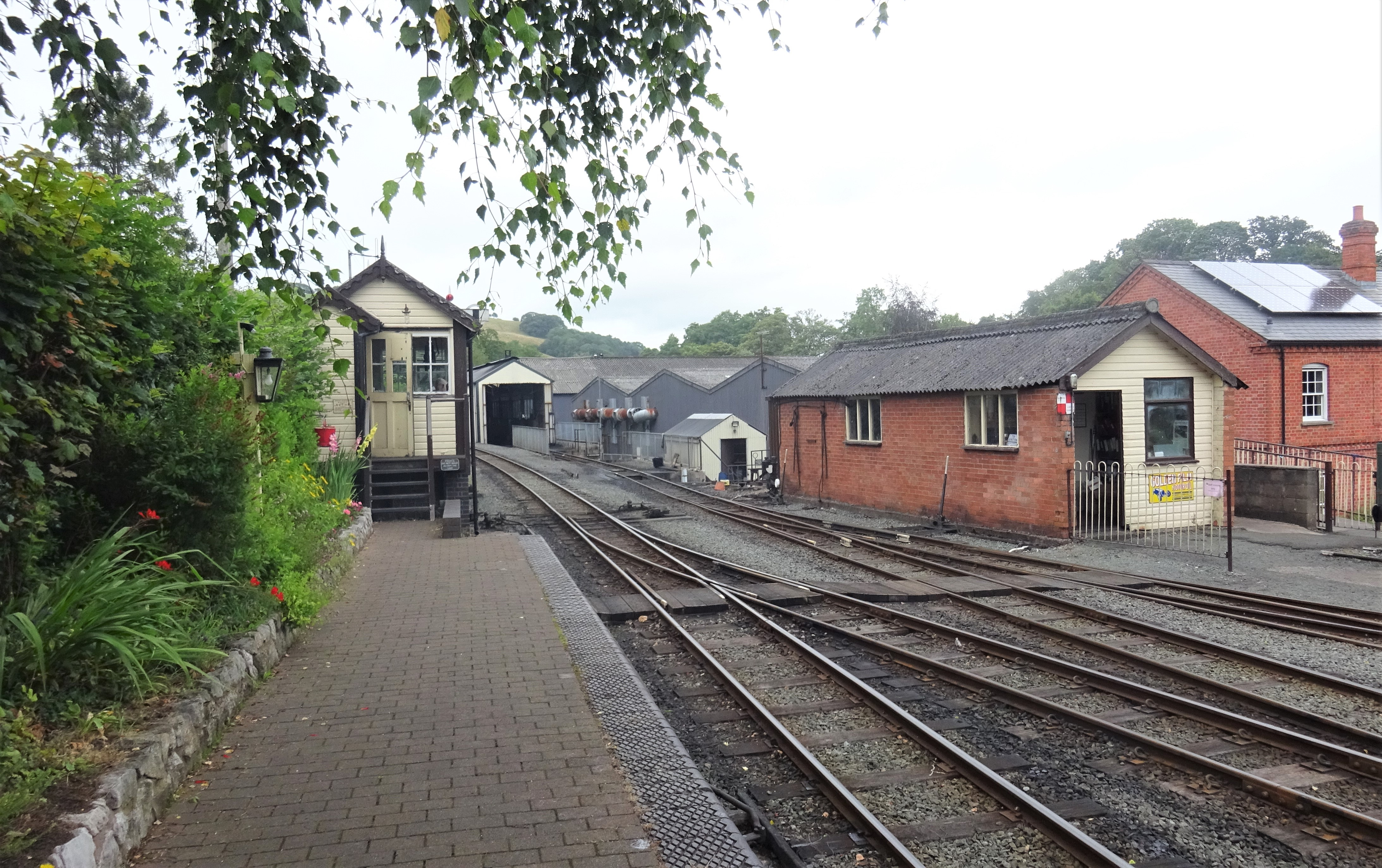
Llanfair Caereinion station on the Welshpool and Llanfair Light Railway.

== History ==
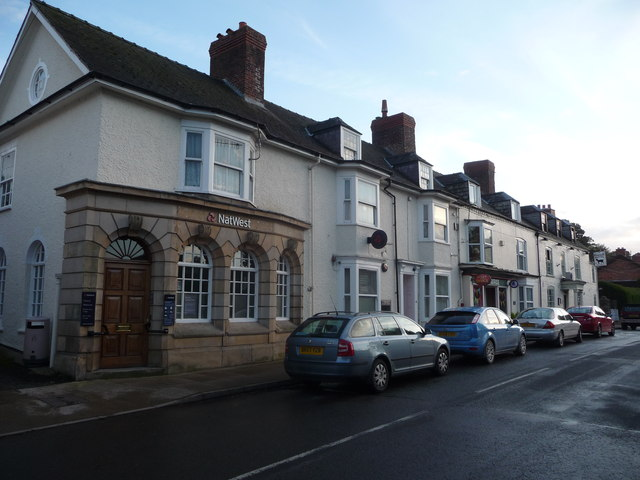
Llanfair Caereinion Town Centre

Its name is a combination of Welsh llan "church" + Mair "Mary" and caer "fort" + Einion, a personal name, meaning "the church of Mary [at] the fort of Einion". The town is built upon the site of an old Roman fort. The site of the Battle of Maes Moydog (1295) is nearby. In 1758 the town was almost completely wiped out by a major fire.

== Geography ==
The town is close to Welshpool. It acts as a centre for many scattered hamlets and villages in the area. The electorate of the community places it fourteenth in size, out of the county's eighteen towns. Llanfair Caereinion is classified as an area centre in the Powys Unitary Development Plan, for the market town has the largest range of community services and facilities and the greatest capacity to accommodate additional development in its locality. There are also rural settlements within the community at Heniarth and Melin-y-ddol. The remainder of the population lives in scattered farms and dwellings.

== Transport ==
The town is served by the following bus routes: 73 (Llanfair-Welshpool-Oswestry) which operates only two services each way on Wednesdays and Fridays between 8:58 and 14:57. 84 (Llanfair-Newtown) which operates only two services each way Mondays-Fridays but is more a school service. 87 (Llanfair-Welshpool-Foel) which operates Mondays to Saturdays with six services a day and three each way to Foel, Llanfair and Welshpool. 89 (Llanfair-Welshpool) offer additional service on Mondays only to Welshpool and back to Llanfair.

The nearest mainline railway station is Welshpool and further away is Machynlleth. The town is also the terminus of the Welshpool and Llanfair Light Railway. This offers an additional method of travel to Welshpool from the town between Wednesdays, Saturdays and Sundays although it is primarily a heritage railway.

== Governance ==
Since the May 2022 local elections, Llanfair Caereinion, with neighbouring Llanerfyl, has been part of the Llanfair Caereinion and Llanerfyl electoral ward, represented by one county councillor on Powys County Council.

== Notable residents ==
- John Griffiths (1837–1918), an artist who worked in India, noted for his Orientalist works, was born here.
- Thomas John Jehu (1871–1943), geologist and physician, was born here.
- Lu Corfield (born ca.1980), a Welsh actress, raised at nearby Four Crosses
- Alis Huws (born 1995), a Welsh harpist, born at Foel.

== Gallery ==
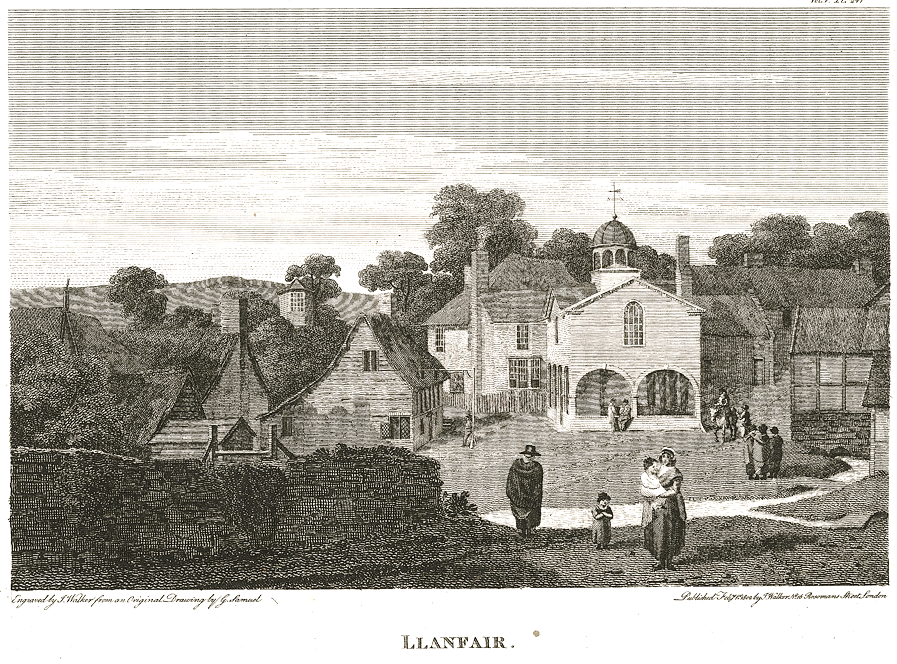
Llanfair Caereinion Town Hall in 1802

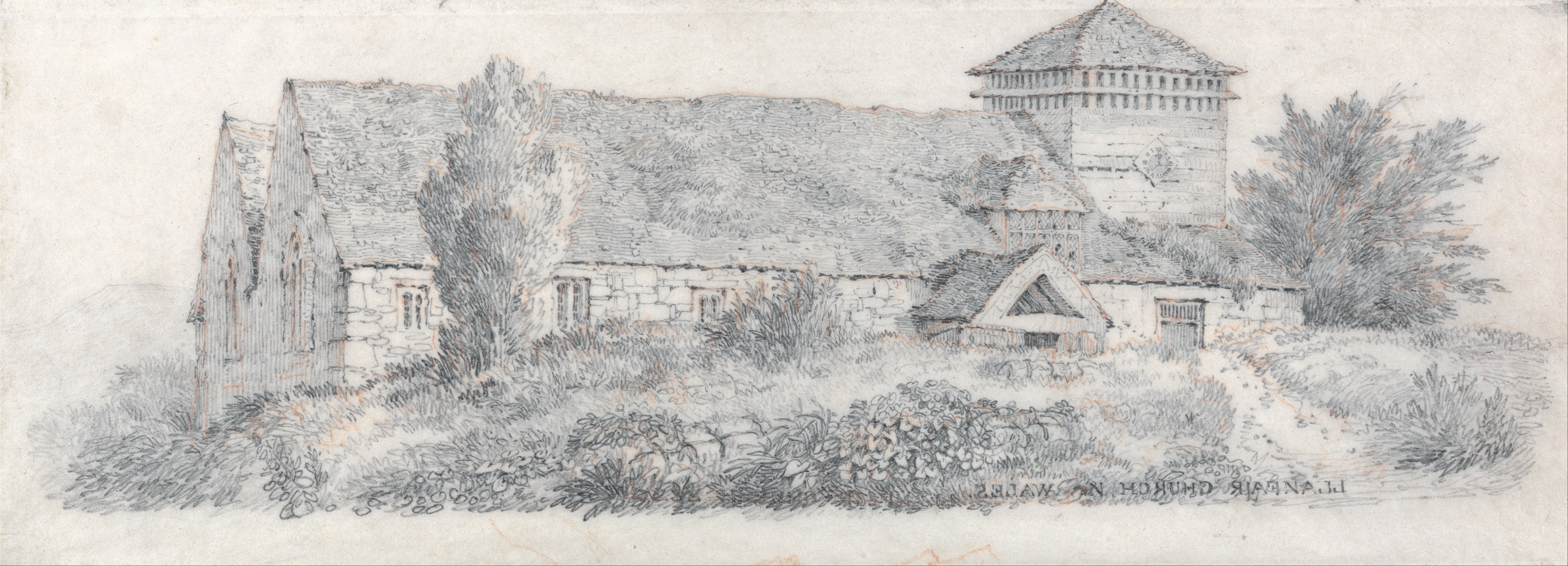
Llanfair Church by David Cox, c.1813
