= Welshpool Raven Square railway station =

Railway station in Powys, Wales

Welshpool Raven Square Welsh: Y Trallwng Sgwar Gigfran
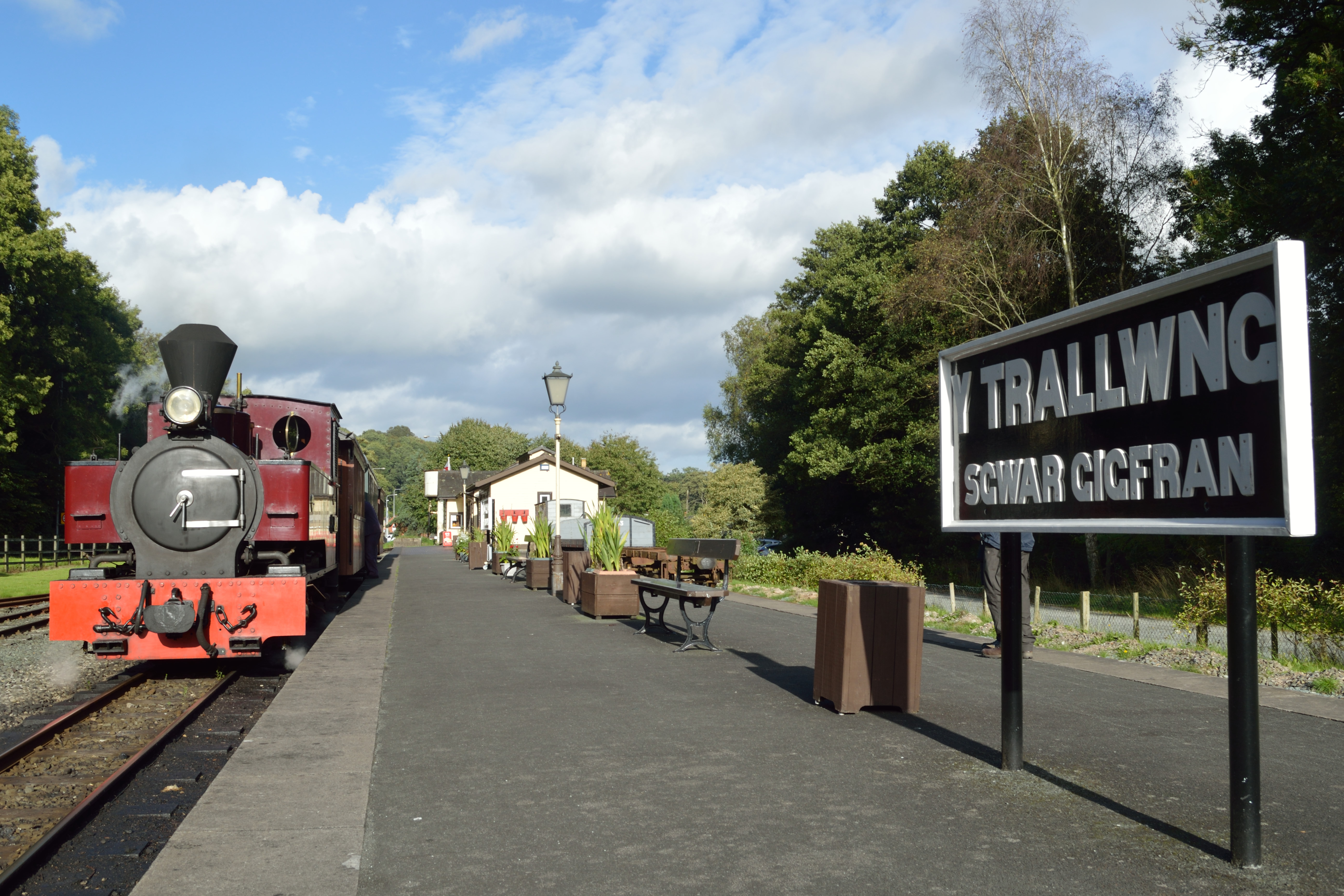

General information
- Location: Welshpool, Powys; Wales
- Coordinates: 52.6599°N 3.1598°W
- Grid reference: SJ216075
- System: Station on heritage railway
- Owner: Welshpool and Llanfair Light Railway
- Manager: Welshpool and Llanfair Light Railway
- Platforms: 2

Key dates
- 1903: original halt opened
- 1931: original halt closed
- 18 July 1981: present station opened
Location

Welshpool Raven Square railway station, located in Welshpool, in Wales, is the eastern terminus of the narrow gauge Welshpool and Llanfair Light Railway (W&LLR).

== History ==
The W&LLR was one of the few narrow gauge branch lines to be built under the provisions of the Light Railways Act 1896 (59 & 60 Vict. c. 48), and opened for operations on 6 April 1903 to aid economic development in a remote area. Originally operated by the Cambrian Railways, it started from a simple set of sidings located alongside the standard gauge line at Welshpool railway station, and traversed the town by means of a twisting section of track which required continual use of the train's bell and whistle.

After the merger of the Cambrian Railways into the Great Western Railway as a result of the 1923 grouping, on 9 February 1931 the line lost its passenger service, and became a freight-only line. It was temporarily re-opened to passengers between 6 and 11 August 1945 for the Eisteddfod. Freight traffic lingered on until 1956, at which time British Railways decided to close the line.

The original Raven Square station was a simple halt with a single low platform which opened with the line in 1903 and closed in 1931.

== Preservation era ==
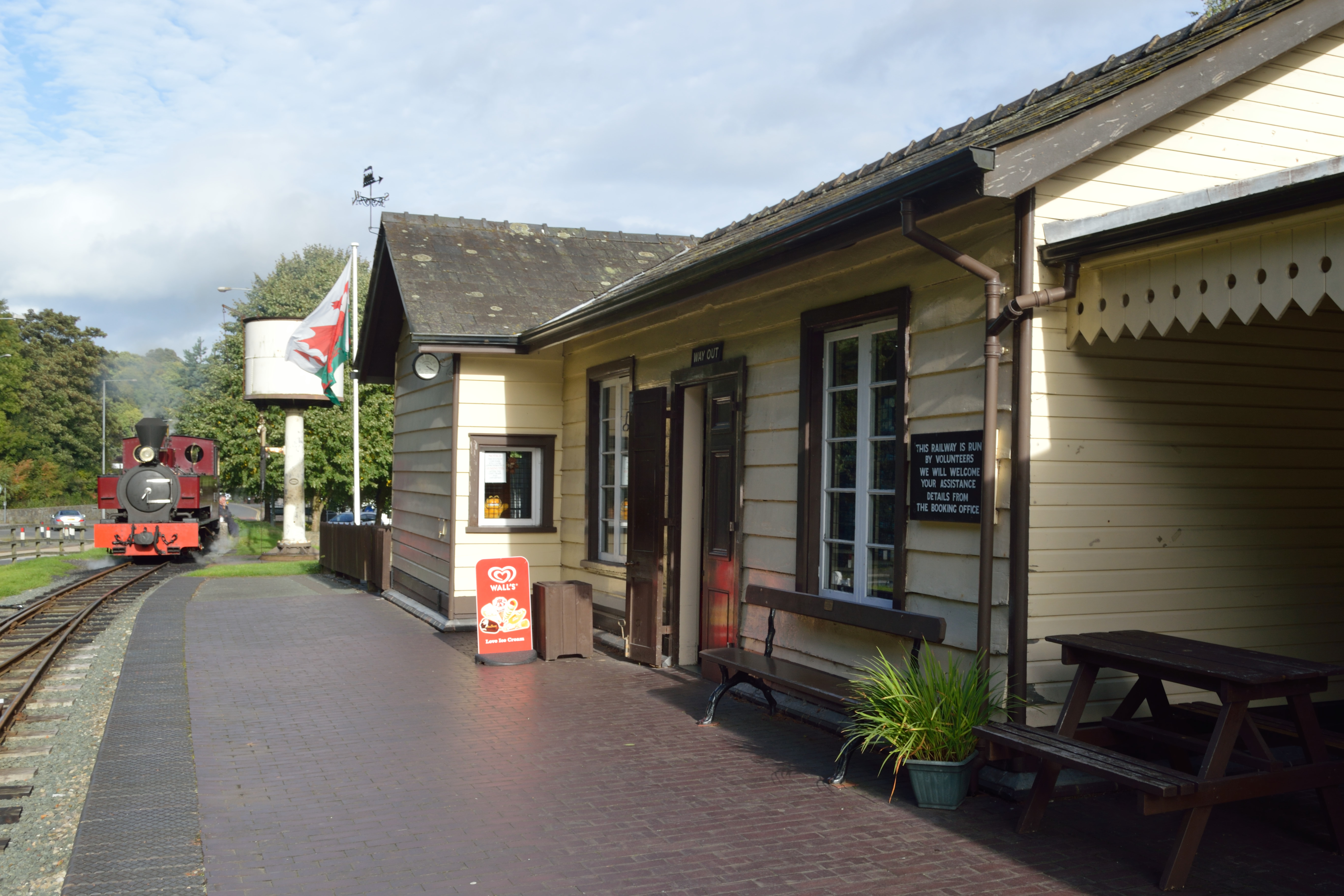
Main station building, with Kerr Stuart Joan in background

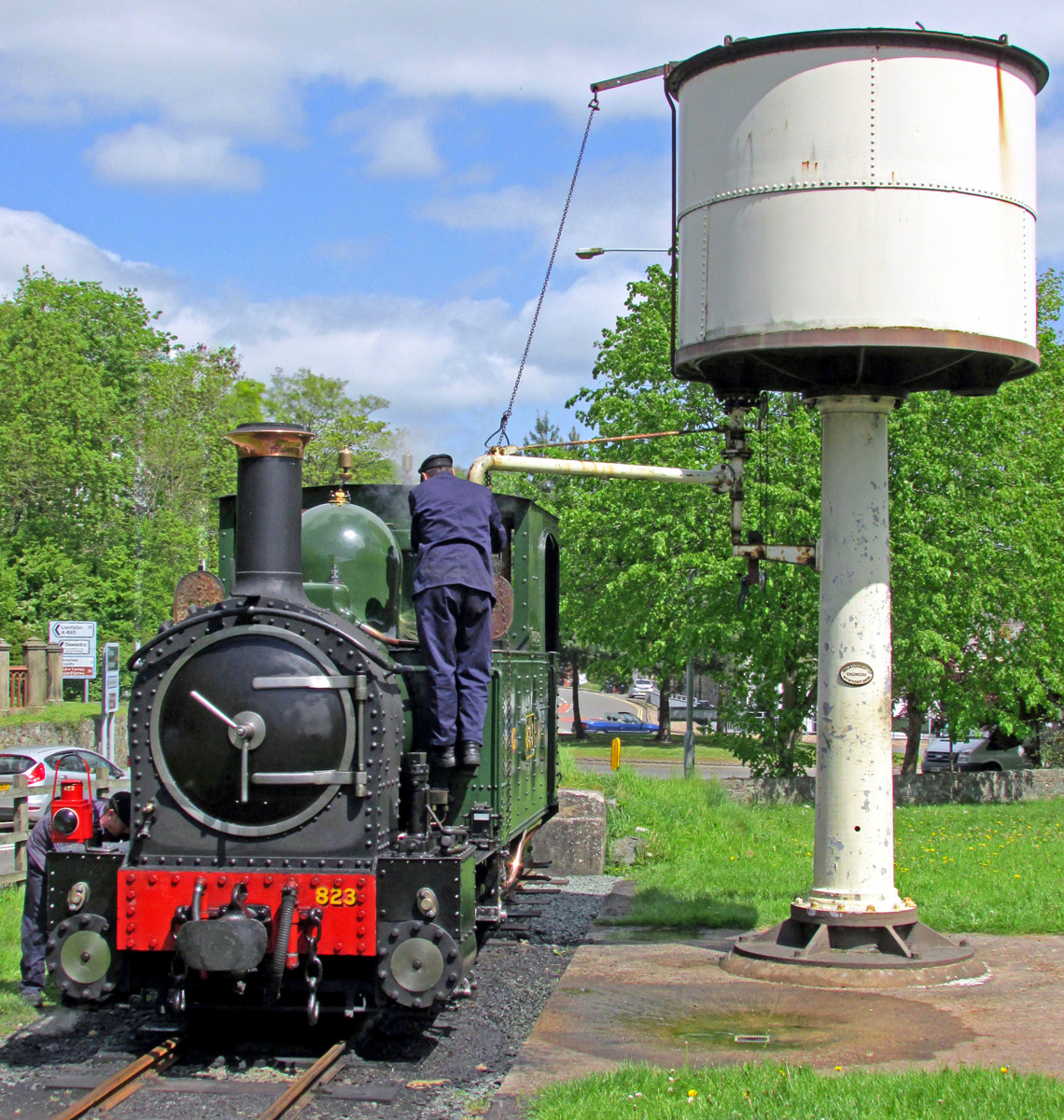
The water tower at Raven Square with No. 823 Countess of 1902 taking water before departing on a passenger train.

A group of volunteers and enthusiasts took the line over and started raising money to preserve and restore it. On 6 April 1963 the first section of the line was re-opened as a tourist railway. The line through the streets of Welshpool however could not be reopened, and so the Cambrian station at Raven Square was redeveloped on the western edge of the town, opening on 18 July 1981. The new station building was obtained from Eardisley in Herefordshire and is a historic example of a type once prepared from a wooden kit, similar to many built on rural lines. Also, a water tower built over 100 years ago was obtained from Pwllheli station. Also at Raven Square is a display shed which houses steam locomotive Monarch, a static exhibit, plus several other items of rolling stock. At Raven Square passengers can disembark, watch the locomotive take on more water and run round the carriages.

== Location ==
The Raven Square station is situated by the roundabout that is the junction of the A458, A490 and B4381 roads. There is a large car park for visitors to the line and pedestrians have a signposted twenty minute walk to the town's main street and the Montgomery Canal lock. It is on the western edge of Welshpool, one mile (1.6 km) from the Cambrian Line station, which is located in the eastern side of the town. Powis Castle and its substantial grounds, lie not far to the south of the station, though not directly accessible from this point. Raven Square also hosts the Raven inn, a family traditional pub which also takes its name from Raven Square

Preceding station	Heritage railways	Following station
Sylfaen towards Llanfair Caereinion	Welshpool & Llanfair Light Railway	Terminus
National Rail
Walking connection with Welshpool on the Cambrian Line
