= Welshpool and Llanfair Light Railway =

From Welshpool to Llanfair Caereinion, Wales

Welshpool & Llanfair Light Railway

Rheilffordd y Trallwng a Llanfair Caereinion
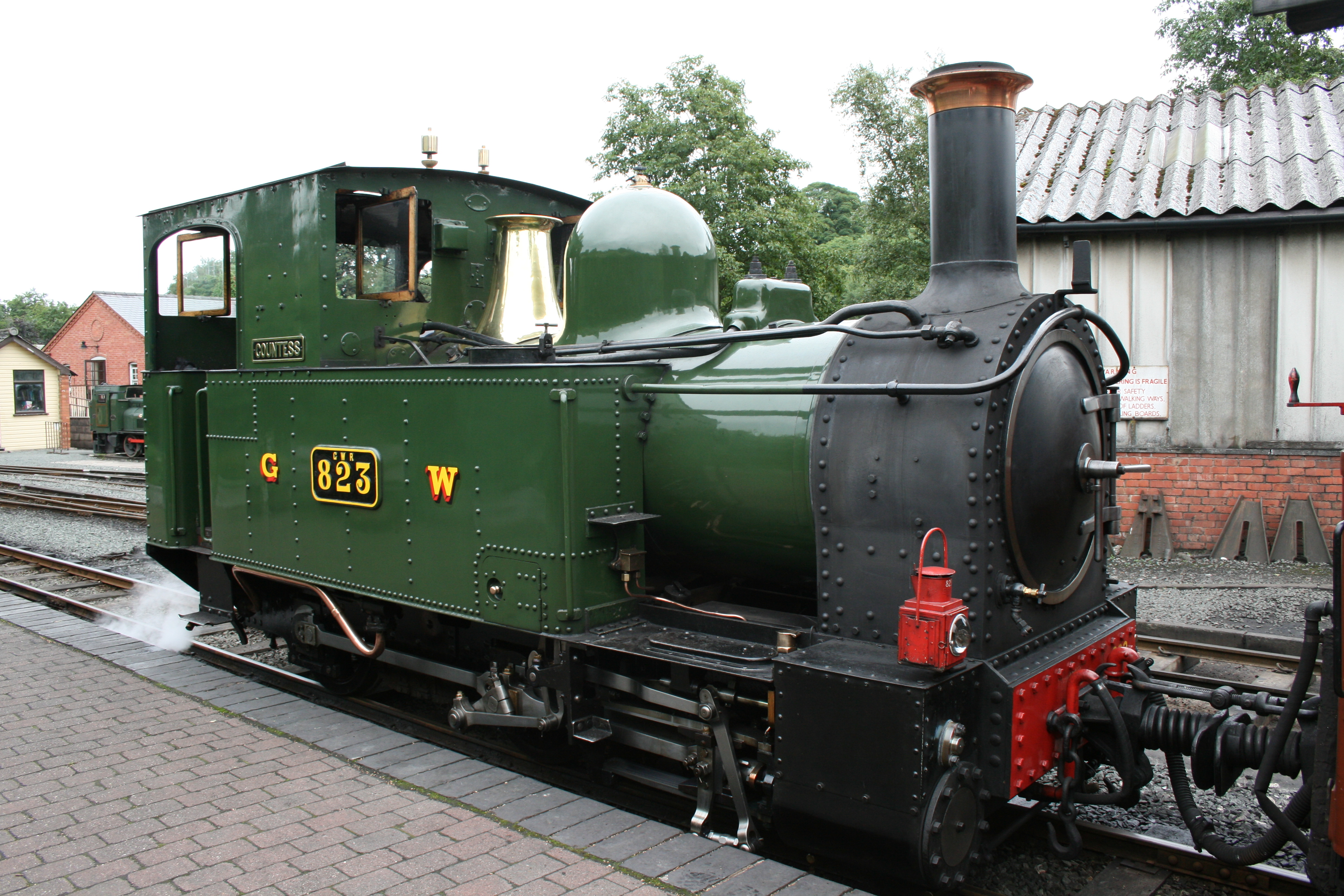
- 823 Countess – one of the two original W&LLR engines
- Locale: Mid-Wales
- Terminus: Welshpool

Commercial operations
- Name: Welshpool & Llanfair Light Railway
- Original gauge: 2 ft 6 in (762 mm)

Preserved operations
- Length: 8.5 miles (13.7 km)
- Preserved gauge: 2 ft 6 in (762 mm)

Commercial history
- Opened: 1903
- Closed to passengers: 1931
- Closed: 1956

Preservation history
- 1963: Re-opened as a heritage railway
- 1972: Services extended to Sylfaen
- 1981: Opening of extension to Raven Square

The Welshpool and Llanfair Light Railway (W&LLR) (Welsh: Rheilffordd y Trallwng a Llanfair Caereinion) is a 2 ft 6 in (762 mm) narrow-gauge heritage railway in Powys, Wales. The line is around 8.5 miles (13.7 km) long and runs westwards from the town of Welshpool (Welsh: Y Trallwng) via Castle Caereinion (Welsh: Castell Caereinion) to the village of Llanfair Caereinion.

== History ==
=== Early proposals ===
Welshpool and Llanfair Railway Act 1877 (Note: Section 1.)
- Act of Parliament
- Parliament of the United Kingdom
- Long title: An Act to authorise the construction of a railway in the county of Montgomery from Welshpool to Llanfair; and for other purposes connected with the said railway.
- Citation: 40 & 41 Vict. c. ccxxv
- Territorial extent: United Kingdom

Dates
- Royal assent: 10 August 1877
- Commencement: 10 August 1877 (Note: The Acts of Parliament (Commencement) Act 1793.)

Status: Current legislation

Text of statute as originally enacted

Welshpool and Llanfair Railway (Abandonment) Act 1882
- Act of Parliament
- Parliament of the United Kingdom
- Long title: An Act for the abandonment of the Welshpool and Llanfair Railway the repayment of the money deposited for securing its completion and the dissolution of the Welshpool and Llanfair Railway Company.
- Citation: 45 & 46 Vict. c. xli
- Territorial extent: United Kingdom

Dates
- Royal assent: 19 June 1882
- Commencement: 19 June 1882
- Repealed: 31 January 2013

Other legislation
- Repealed by: Statute Law (Repeals) Act 2013

Status: Repealed

Text of statute as originally enacted

Welshpool and Llanfair Railway Act 1887
- Act of Parliament
- Parliament of the United Kingdom
- Long title: An Act to incorporate a company for the construction of a railway from Welshpool to Llanfair in the county of Montgomery and for other purposes.
- Citation: 50 & 51 Vict. c. clxxxv
- Territorial extent: United Kingdom

Dates
- Royal assent: 23 August 1887
- Commencement: 23 August 1887
- Repealed: 20 May 1892

Other legislation
- Repealed by: Welshpool and Llanfair Railway (Abandonment) Act 1892

Status: Repealed

Welshpool and Llanfair Railway (Abandonment) Act 1892
- Act of Parliament
- Parliament of the United Kingdom
- Long title: An Act for the abandonment of the Welshpool and Llanfair Railway.
- Citation: 55 & 56 Vict. c. ii
- Territorial extent: United Kingdom

Dates
- Royal assent: 20 May 1892
- Commencement: 20 May 1892
- Repealed: 31 January 2013

Other legislation
- Repeals/revokes: Welshpool and Llanfair Railway Act 1887
- Repealed by: Statute Law (Repeals) Act 2013

Status: Repealed

Text of statute as originally enacted

The first proposal to connect Llanfair Caerinion and Welshpool by railway was the Llanfair Railway of 1864; this would have been a narrow-gauge line, with a mixed-gauge section where it connected to the Cambrian Railways. This proposal was abandoned. The next attempt came in 1876 with the promotion of the Welshpool and Llanfair Railway Bill, which proposed a railway along a similar route to the 1864 effort. This bill passed through the Houses of Parliament, becoming the Welshpool and Llanfair Railway Act 1877 (40 & 41 Vict. c. ccxxv). This attempt failed because the promoters were unable to raise sufficient capital, and was officially abandoned by the Welshpool and Llanfair Railway (Abandonment) Act 1882 (45 & 46 Vict. c. xli). In 1886, another Welshpool and Llanfair Railway Bill appeared for a 3 ft (914 mm) gauge railway on a similar route; this became the Welshpool and Llanfair Railway Act 1887 (50 & 51 Vict. c. clxxxv) which expired unused in 1892, and was officially abandoned by the Welshpool and Llanfair Railway (Abandonment) Act 1892 (55 & 56 Vict. c. ii).

=== The Light Railways Act 1896 ===
In August 1896, the Light Railways Act 1896 (59 & 60 Vict. c. 48) was passed, and this spurred further attempts at a railway to Llanfair Caereinion. The first of these was the Llanfair and Meifod Valley Light Railway Bill of 1896, which proposed a standard-gauge line from Arddleen about 8 miles north of Welshpool, through the Meifod Valley.

In late December 1896, the mayor of Welshpool William Addie proposed a 2 ft 6 in (762 mm) gauge railway called the Welshpool and Llanfair Light Railway. By March 1897, Addie had contracted with noted narrow-gauge promoter Everard Calthrop to assist in preparing a case for the inquiry. An application for a light railway order was submitted to the Board of Trade in May 1897. Calthrop proposed the use of transporter wagons, 0-6-0 tank locomotives and a large "Barsi-type" locomotive for heavy market day traffic. At the August 1897 public inquiry Calthrop appeared, along with J. R. Dix manager of the Corris Railway. The enquiry considered both the Llanfair & Meifod Light Railway and the Welshpool and Llanfair Light Railway proposals. The commissioners took their time deciding. Meanwhile, the promoters of the W&LLR had approached the Cambrian Railways to have them pay for and construct the railway. After much time-consuming negotiations, the Cambrian agreed and on 8 September 1899, the Welshpool and Llanfair Light Railway Order 1899 was granted to begin construction of the line.

=== Original operations ===
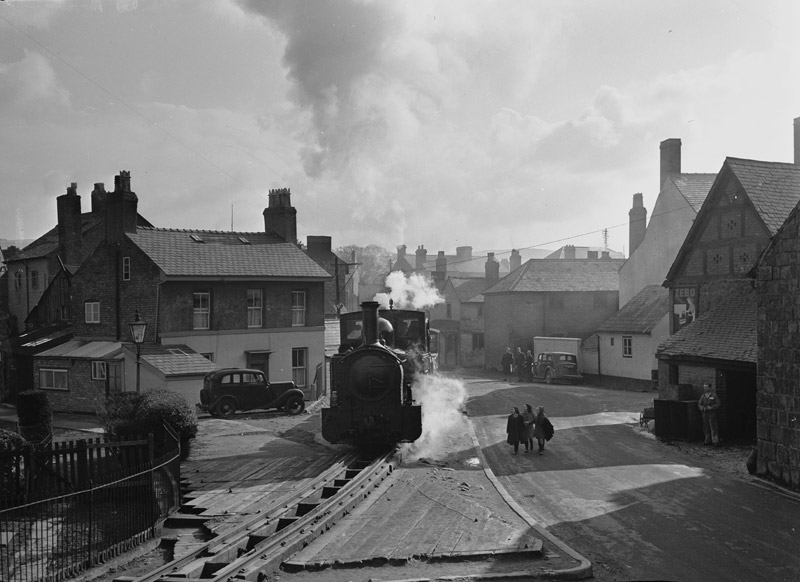
Train in the streets of Welshpool (1950)

It was opened on 6 April 1903 to aid economic development in a remote area, never making a profit. It was originally operated by the Cambrian Railways, connecting with it at the former Oswestry and Newtown Railway station in the town of Welshpool. The line is built through difficult country, having a great number of curves in order to reach the summit of 600 ft. The original terminus at Welshpool was located alongside the main line station and trains wound their way through the town, using the locomotive bell as a warning.

In the 1923 Grouping of railway companies, Cambrian Railways, including the Welshpool to Llanfair Caereinion line, was absorbed by the Great Western Railway (GWR). On 9 February 1931 the line lost its passenger service, which was replaced by a bus service, and it became a freight-only line. It was temporarily re-opened to passengers between 6 and 11 August 1945 for the Eisteddfod. The GWR itself was nationalised in 1948 and became part of British Railways.

Freight traffic lingered on until 1956, by which time British Railways decided to close the line, with services ceasing on 5 November.

=== Preservation ===
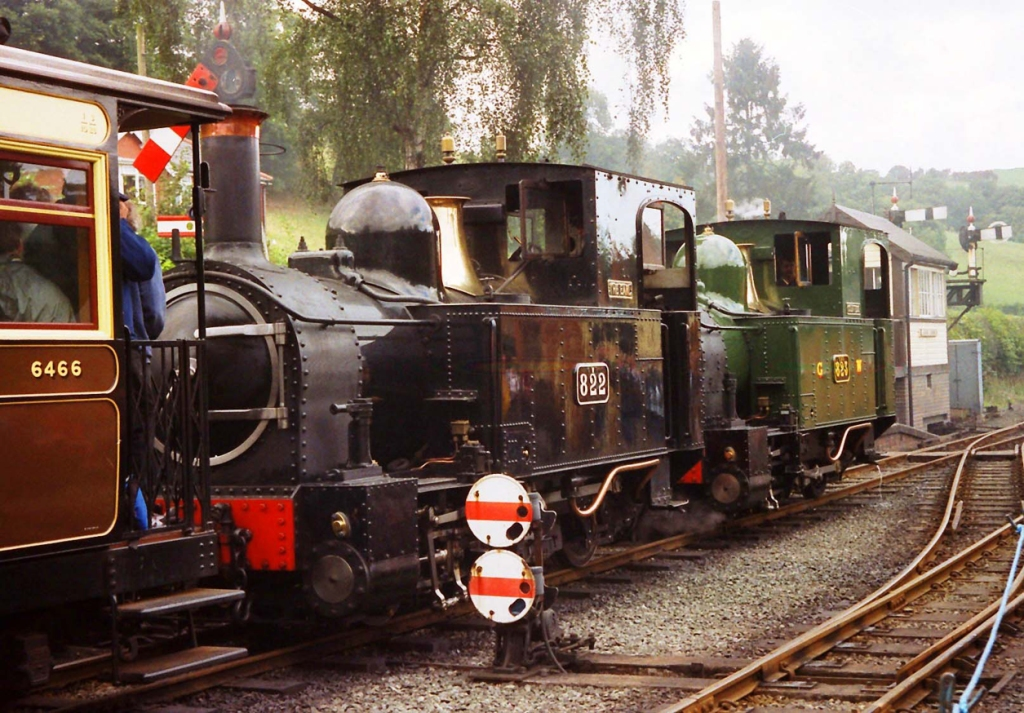
Gala Day: "The Earl" and "The Countess" at Llanfair Caerinion

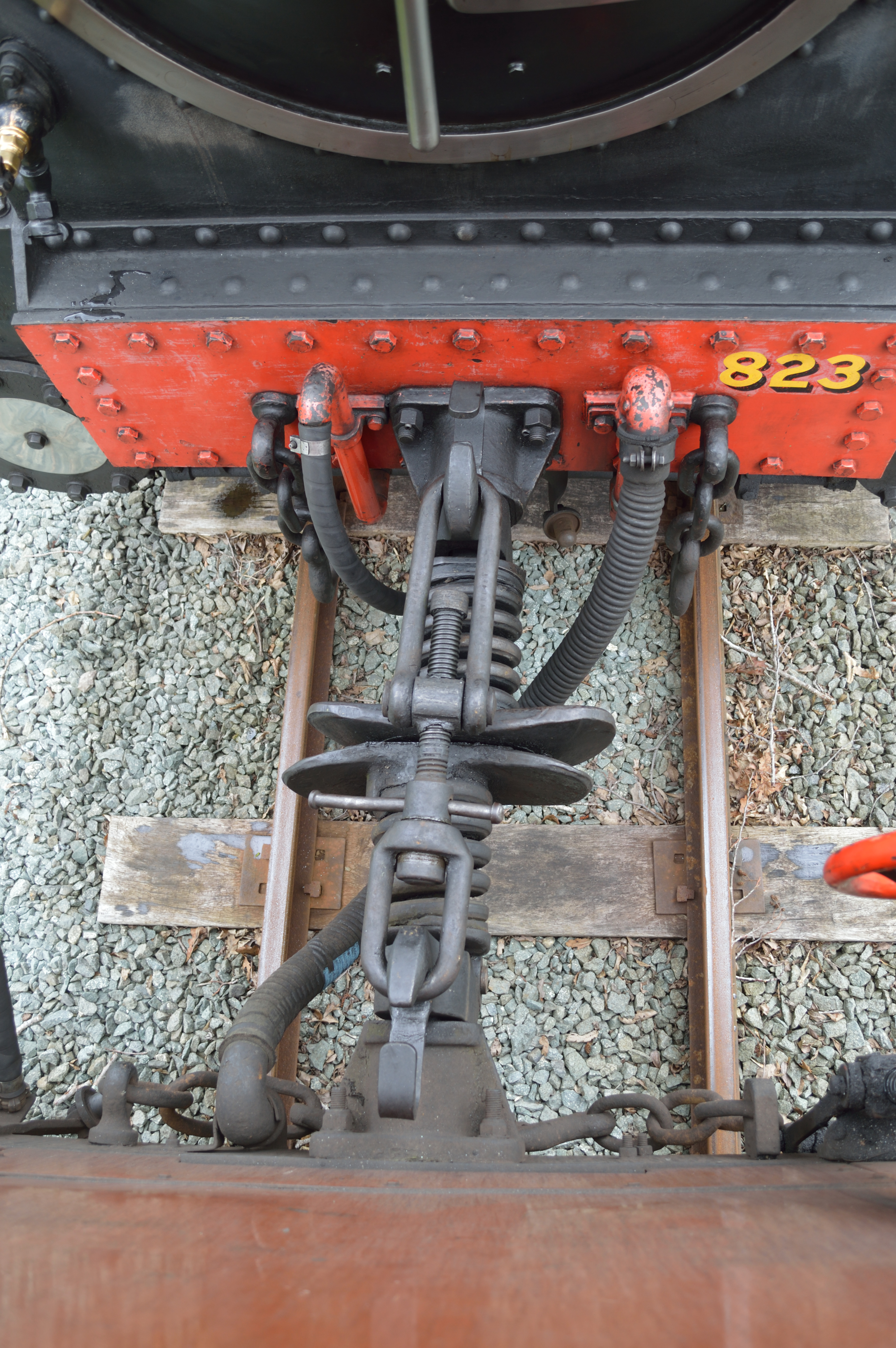
The Grondana coupling now used on the railway, with a centre buffer and screw coupling link

A group of volunteers and enthusiasts took the line over and started raising money to restore it. On 6 April 1963, the western half of the line, from Llanfair Caereinion to Castle Caereinion, was reopened as a Heritage railway.

On 13 December 1964, a pier supporting the steel girder bridge over the River Banwy was seriously damaged by flood waters dislodging the bridge. During the spring and early summer of 1965 the 16th Railway Regiment of the Royal Engineers replaced the damaged masonry pier with a fabricated steel one and restored the span to its original position. Train services between Llanfair Caereinion to Castle Caereinion resumed on 14 August 1965.

In 1972, services were extended to Sylfaen. The line through Welshpool, however, could not be reopened, so the line now has a new terminus station at Raven Square on the western outskirts of the town, opened on 18 July 1981. In 2008, there were discussions with Welshpool Town Council about reinstating the link through the town to the main line station, following a different route from that originally used.

Because of the 2 ft 6 in (762 mm) gauge, unusual for British narrow-gauge railways, locomotives and rolling stock to supplement the originals have had to be obtained from sources around the world including the Zillertalbahn in Austria. A major grant from the Heritage Lottery Fund permitted restoration of both original locomotives together with several coaches and original wagons, and provision of new workshop facilities, ready for the line's centenary.

== Golfa Bank ==
Golfa Bank is a particularly steep bank on the railway. The bank is nearly a mile at 1 in 29, which in its day, was the steepest section of the Cambrian Railways worked by passenger trains and is still a challenging climb. The line travelling up the slope is curvy, to make the climb easier. Golfa summit is 630 ft above sea level, meaning the locomotives have to travel from about 350 ft above sea level at the bottom of Golfa Bank, equal to climbing 280 ft in 1.5 miles. The locomotives had to be built specifically to manage the bank, due to its steepness.

There was a halt at the top called Golfa, 1.75 miles or 3.2 km from the Welshpool Raven Square terminus. The halt had a loop that was provided for goods traffic. The station was opened on 6 April 1903. and closed with the line in 1931. The station officially reopened on 18 July 1981, but was closed again by 2015.

== Locomotives ==
=== Preserved locomotives ===
WLLR No.	Name	Image	Builder	Works No.	Date built	Date arrived	Wheels	Type	Status
1	The Earl	The Earl	Beyer Peacock	3496	1902	1902	0-6-0T	Steam	Operational
1	The Earl	The Earl	Original W&LLR locomotive. Overhauled at the Vale of Rheidol Railway between 2019 and 2021. Currently painted in a Great Western green livery.						
2	Countess	Countess basks in the sunshine at Welshpool	Beyer Peacock	3497	1902	1902	0-6-0T	Steam	Withdrawn following expiry of boiler certificate 2021
2	Countess	Countess basks in the sunshine at Welshpool	Original W&LLR locomotive						
5	Nutty		Sentinel	7701	1929	1964	4wVBT	Steam	N/A
5	Nutty		Previously from Fletton Brickworks. Owned by and returned to care of Narrow Gauge Railway Museum in 1971, returned to the WLLR in 2023 having been at the Leighton Buzzard Railway.						
6	Monarch	Bagnall 3024 of 1953 - aka Monarch from the Bowaters railway at Sittingbourne	W. G. Bagnall	3024	1953	1966	0-4-4-0T	Steam	On display
6	Monarch	Bagnall 3024 of 1953 - aka Monarch from the Bowaters railway at Sittingbourne	From the Sittingbourne and Kemsley Light Railway. Sold to the Ffestiniog Railway but re-purchased by W&LLR.						
7	Chattenden *	Chattenden shunts the Sierra Leone coaches	Drewry Car Co.	2263	1947	1968	0-6-0DM	Diesel	Operational
7	Chattenden *	Chattenden shunts the Sierra Leone coaches	ex-Chattenden and Upnor Railway (also known as the Lodge Hill & Upnor Railway), previously from Admiralty Depots, rebuilt at Llanfair in 1980. Has recently been rebuilt at Llanfair and is now fitted with both air and vacuum braking.						
8	Dougal *	Dougal and train	Andrew Barclay	2207	1946	1968	0-4-0T	Steam	On display
8	Dougal *	Dougal and train	Originally operated at Provan Gasworks, Glasgow. Currently awaiting boiler repairs						
10	Sir Drefaldwyn *	Welshpool (Raven Square) Station - geograph.org.uk - 108487	Franco-Belge	2855	1944	1969	0-8-0T	Steam	Operational
10	Sir Drefaldwyn *	Welshpool (Raven Square) Station - geograph.org.uk - 108487	Originally operated by the German Army as a tender engine. Then in Austria at the Salzkammergut-Lokalbahn as Number 19, then sold to the Steiermärkische Landesbahn as Number "699.01", where it was converted to a tank engine. An HF 160 D-type locomotive.						
11	Ferret *	Ferret	Hunslet Engine Company	2251	1940	1971	0-4-0DM	Diesel	Operational
11	Ferret *	Ferret	Previously from Admiralty armament depot in Wiltshire. Initially named Raven after the loco it replaced. Returned to service in 2015 and is used primarily as a works shunter at Llanfair.						
12	Joan	Joan at Raven Square	Kerr Stuart	4404	1929	1971	0-6-2T	Steam	On display
12	Joan	Joan at Raven Square	Originally operated in Antigua. Returned to service in 2011 with a new boiler. Out of service from 2020 following expiry of 10 year boiler ticket.						
14		WLLR 14 at Castle Caereinion	Hunslet Engine Company	3815	1954	1975	2-6-2T	Steam	On display
14		WLLR 14 at Castle Caereinion	Originally operated by Sierra Leone Government Railway.						
16	Scooby *		Hunslet Engine Company	2400	1941	1992	0-4-0DM	Diesel	Stored
16	Scooby *		Previously from Admiralty Depots. Rebuilt by W&LLR						
17		Diema	Diema	4270	1979	2004	6wDH	Diesel	Operational
17		Diema	Originally operated by Taiwan Sugar Company						

* = Name added by WLLR

=== Locomotives on hire ===
No.	Name	Image	Builder	Works No.	Date built	Date arrived	Wheels	Type	Status
21	Zillertal	No 2 Zillertal	Lokomotivfabrik Krauss & Co.	4506	1900	2019	0-6-2T	Steam	Operational
21	Zillertal	No 2 Zillertal	U Class, one of two locomotives built for the opening of the Zillertalbahn. Arrived in August 2019 on hire from the Zillertalbahn for approximately two years.						

=== Former locomotives ===
WLLR No.	Name	Image	Builder	Works No.	Date built	Date arrived	Wheels	Type	Status
3	Raven *		Ruston & Hornsby	170374	1934	1961	4wDM	Diesel	N/A
3	Raven *		Sold in 1974. Now in private ownership.						
4	Upnor Castle *	Upnorcastleconst	F. C. Hibberd	3687	1954	1964	4wDM	Diesel	N/A
4	Upnor Castle *	Upnorcastleconst	Sold to Ffestiniog Railway in 1968.						
9	Wynnstay *	Victor and Hector at the Great Whipsnade Railway	J. Fowler	4160005	1951	1969	0-6-0DM	Diesel	N/A
9	Wynnstay *	Victor and Hector at the Great Whipsnade Railway	Built for a failed groundnuts scheme in East Africa. In 1954 sold to British Portland Cement Co.'s works at Lower Penarth, Glamorgan. Arrived at Llanfair in 1969, sold to the Great Whipsnade Railway in 1972 as Victor.						
15	Orion *		Tubize	2369	1948	1983	2-6-2T	Steam	N/A
15	Orion *		Previously from Finland. Returned to Jokioinen Museum Railway in Finland in 2006.						
18	764.423		Reșița Works		1957	2004	0-8-0T	Steam	N/A
18	764.423		Originally operated in Romania. Sold in May 2016 to an Austrian buyer as a spare parts donor for No. 19.						
19	764.425	Locomotive at Welshpool - geograph.org.uk - 1926845	Reșița Works		1957	2007	0-8-0T	Steam	N/A
19	764.425	Locomotive at Welshpool - geograph.org.uk - 1926845	Originally operated in Romania. Sold in May 2016 to an Austrian buyer.						

* = Name added by WLLR

== Passenger carriages ==
=== Carriages of the preserved railway ===
WLLR No.	Other No.	Image	Builder	Type	Date built	Date arrived	Notes
B14			Grazer Waggon	4-wheel balcony	1900	1968	Built for and donated by Zillertalbahn
B16			Grazer Waggon	4-wheel balcony	1901	1968	Built for and donated by Zillertalbahn
B17			Grazer Waggon	4-wheel balcony	1901	1968	Built for and donated by Zillertalbahn
C572	B25		Grazer Waggon	4-wheel balcony	1925	1968	Built for Satzkammergut-Lokalbahn
C569	B24		Grazer Waggon	4-wheel balcony	1925	2003	Built for Satzkammergut Lokalbahn
B27			Grazer Waggon	4-wheel balcony	1954	1975	Built for Austrian State Railways
1066	1040		GRC&W	Bogie third	1961	1975	Rebuilt in Romania, 2008
1207			GRC&W	Bogie first	1961	1975	Rebuilt in Romania, 2009
418			Hungarian State Rly	Bogie	1958	1999	Rebuilt with extended balcony 2018-19
430			Hungarian State Rly	Bogie	1958	1999	Rebuilt with extended balcony 2018-19
6466			Ffestiniog Railway	Bogie composite	2004		Replica of 1903 R.Y. Pickering original
4154			Ffestiniog Railway	Bogie third	2007		Replica of 1903 R.Y. Pickering original
B20			S.C. Calea Ferata Ingusta SRL in Brad	4-wheel balcony	2006	2007	Replica of Austrian Zillertalbahn carriage
6338			Ffestiniog Railway	Bogie composite	2010		Replica of 1903 R.Y. Pickering original

== Coordinates ==
- Welshpool station: 52.659729°N 3.160082°W
- Llanfair station: 52.651978°N 3.322146°W

== See also ==
- British narrow-gauge railways
- Great Little Trains of Wales
- Welshpool Seven Stars Halt railway station

== Bibliography ==
- Butt, R. V. J. (October 1995). The Directory of Railway Stations: details every public and private passenger station, halt, platform and stopping place, past and present (1st ed.). Sparkford: Patrick Stephens Ltd. ISBN 978-1-85260-508-7. OCLC 60251199. OL 11956311M.
- Cartwright, Ralph I. (2002). The Welshpool & Llanfair. RailRomances. ISBN 1-900622-06-8
- Edwards, Oliver (2023). Welshpool & Llanfair Light Railway Through the Years. Narrow Gauge Album No. 1. Chippenham, Wilts, UK: Mainline & Maritime. ISBN 9781900340632.
- Rushton, Gordon (2015). The Welshpool & Llanfair Railway Travellers's Guide. Llanfair Caereinion : Welshpool & Llanfair Railway.
- The Welshpool & Llanfair Light Railway (2021). The Welshpool & Llanfair Light Railway Traveller's Guide. The Welshpool & Llanfair Light Railway.
