= Fan Nedd =

Mountain (663m) in Powys, Wales

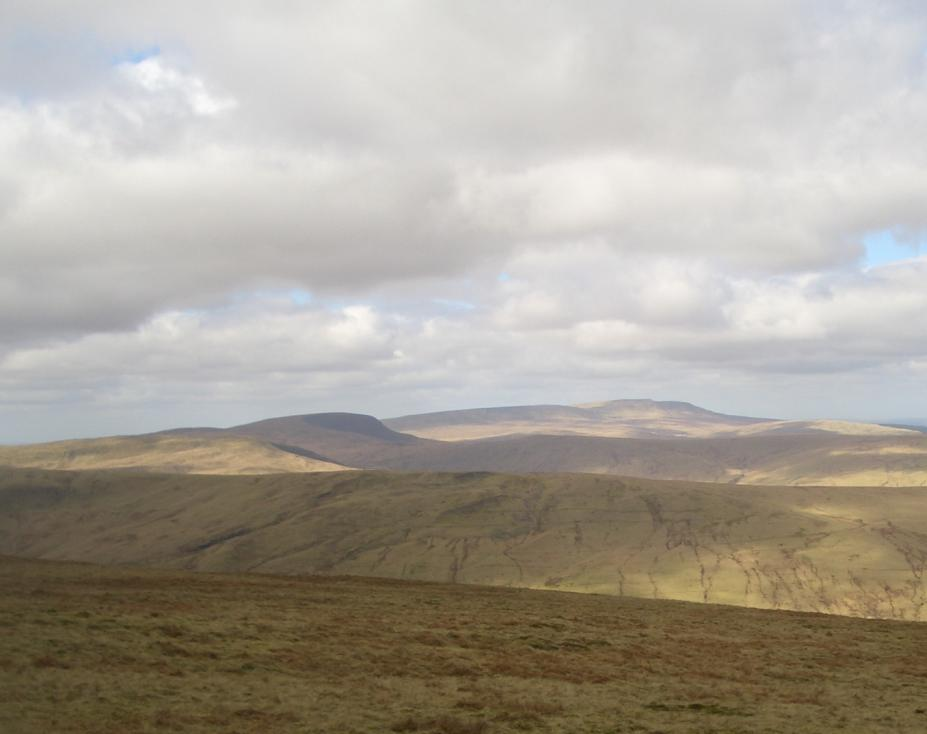
- Fan Llia, Fan Nedd, Fan Gyhirych from the summit of Fan Fawr

Highest point
- Elevation: 663 m (2,175 ft)
- Prominence: 174 m (571 ft)
- Parent peak: Fan Gyhirych
- Listing: Marilyn, Hewitt, Nuttall
- Coordinates: 51.8529°N 3.5792°W

Naming
- English translation: Neath beacon
- Language of name: Welsh

Geography
- Location: Powys, Wales
- Parent range: Brecon Beacons
- OS grid: SN913184
- Topo map: OS Landranger 160

Fan Nedd is a mountain in the Fforest Fawr area of the Brecon Beacons National Park in Wales. In common with the rest of the Fforest Fawr uplands it is within the county of Powys.

The hill is in the form of a broad flat-topped ridge whose summit lies at 663 m (2175 ft) and is crowned by a trig point. Its southern ridge is the least steep whereas its northern aspect is steep and craggy, having hosted a small glacier in the last ice age.

A prominent modern cairn marks the northern end of the plateau whilst a couple of ancient cairns are to be found on its eastern slopes. The hill is drained to the west by a number of streams running into the Nedd Fechan river whilst to the east, rainwater spills into the upper reaches of the Afon Llia. Both ultimately drain via the River Neath to the sea at Swansea Bay. Its northern face overlooks the deep glacial hollow of Blaen Senni drained by the Afon Senni, a tributary of the River Usk. The hill presumably takes its name from that of the river.

== Geology ==
The hill is formed largely from sandstones of the Brownstones Formation of the Old Red Sandstone dating from the Devonian period. Sandstones of the overlying Plateau Beds Formation extend some way up the southern slopes of the hill though bedrock is for the most part concealed beneath a blanket of glacial till and hill peat. Only on its northern face is rock exposed to any significant degree. The hill is within the Fforest Fawr Geopark designated in 2005 in recognition of the area's geological heritage.

== Access ==
The entire hill is designated as open country so walkers may wander at will though most prefer to follow a path which skirts the rim of the steep northern face between Bwlch y Duwynt to the west and the minor road between the villages of Ystradfellte and Heol Senni to the east.
