= Cefn Cul =

Hill in Powys, Wales

Coordinates: 51.8725°N 3.6548°W

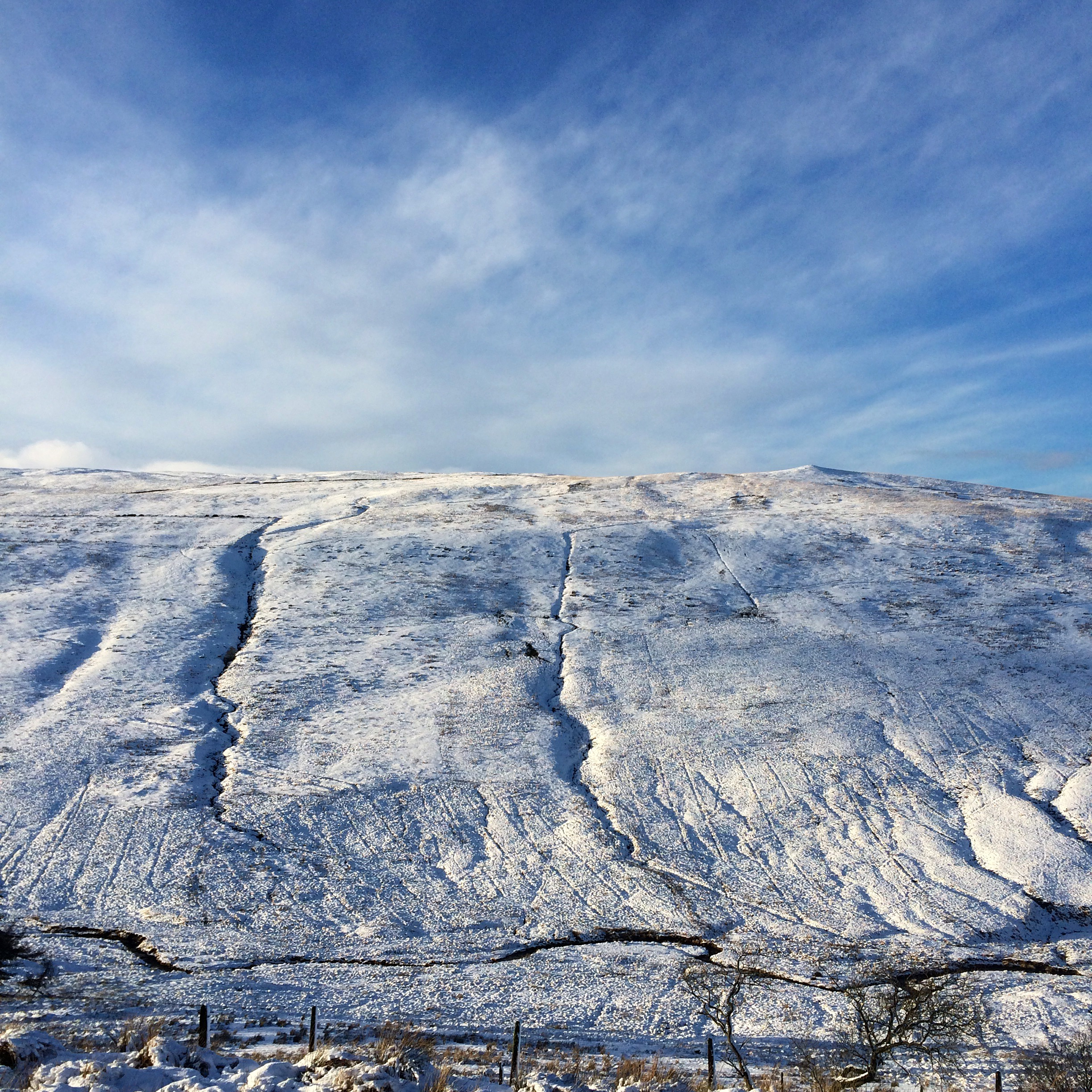
Cefn Cul

Cefn Cul is a hill in the Fforest Fawr sector of the Brecon Beacons National Park in Powys, southern Wales. It is a broad north-northeast to south-southwest aligned ridge whose summit reaches a height of 562 m above sea level. The hill is bounded to the west by the upper valley of the River Tawe though which the old Trecastle road runs whilst to the east is the pass of Bwlch Bryn-rhudd over which the A4067 road runs from the Crai valley south to that of the Tawe.

== Geology ==
Cefn Cul is formed from sandstones and mudstones of the Senni Beds and Brownstones Formations of the Old Red Sandstone laid down during the Devonian period. Whilst the regional dip of the rock beds is to the south, locally they vary and a broad anticlinal structure coincides with the hill. It is within the area designated in 2005 as Fforest Fawr Geopark.

== Archaeology ==
An ancient cairn occurs near the southern end and a standing stone can be found just above the minor road to the west of Cefn Cul. Arguably the principal feature of the hill is the scatter of pillow mounds across its southern spur and over its lower eastern slopes above Cray Reservoir. These were established in the nineteenth century for the production of rabbit fur and meat.

== Access ==
The hill is designated as open country so freely accessible to walkers though a series of fences and walls cross the hill and require negotiation without damage.
