= Fan Fraith =

Hill (668m) in Powys, Wales

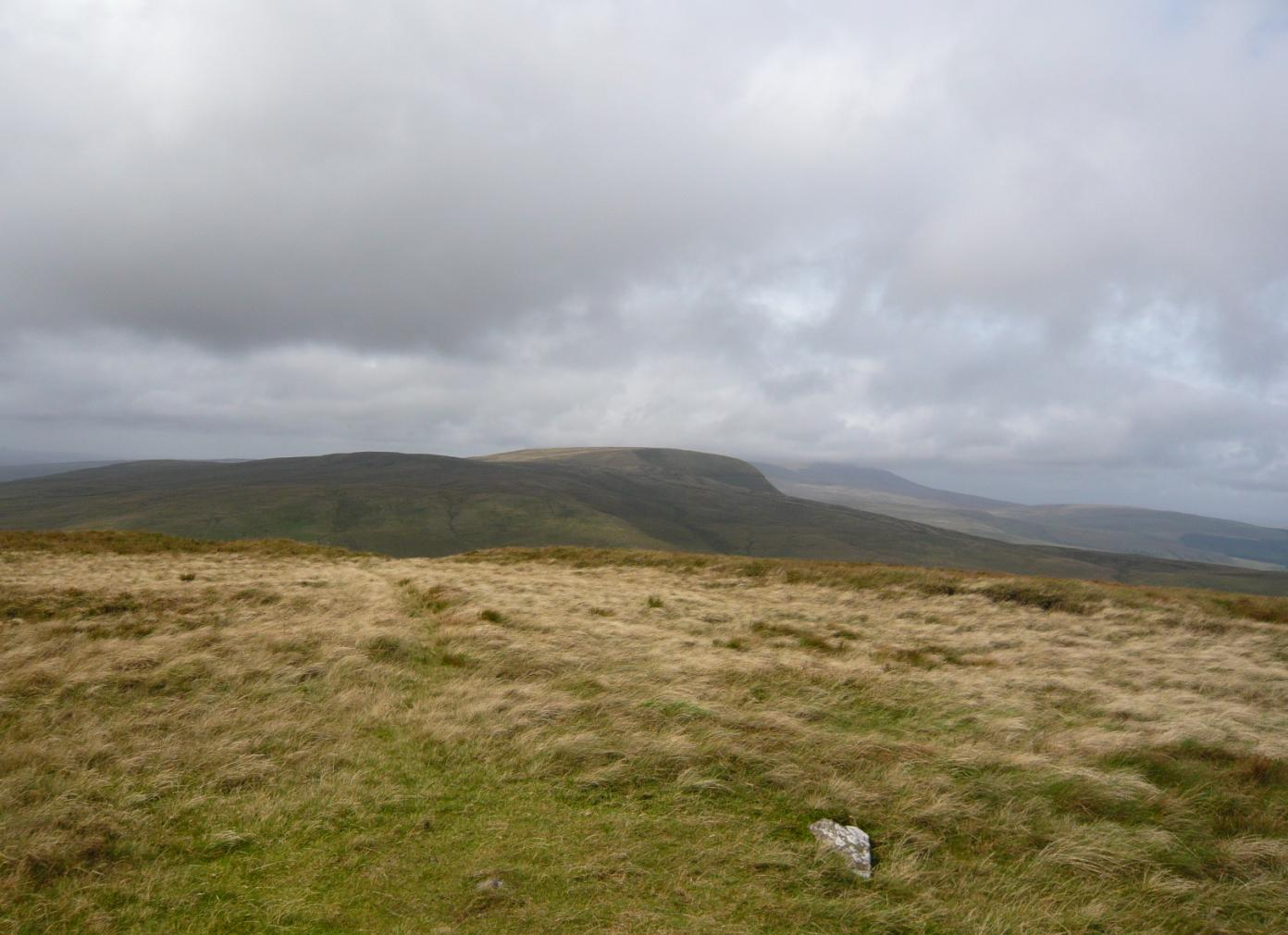
- Fan Gyhirych and Fan Fraith from Fan Nedd

Highest point
- Elevation: 668 m (2,192 ft)
- Prominence: 16 m (52 ft)
- Parent peak: Fan Gyhirych
- Listing: Nuttall
- Coordinates: 51.8526°N 3.6173°W

Naming
- Language of name: Welsh

Geography
- Location: Powys, Wales
- Parent range: Brecon Beacons
- Topo map: OS Landranger 160

Fan Fraith is a top of Fan Gyhirych in the Fforest Fawr section of the Brecon Beacons National Park in the county of Powys, south Wales. Its summit is at a height of 2192 feet or 668 m. It lies within Fforest Fawr Geopark.

== Geology ==
The bulk of the hill is formed from sandstones and mudstones of the Brownstones Formation of the Old Red Sandstone laid down during the Devonian period. Sandstones of the overlying Plateau Beds Formation occur in the summit area as do beds of the Grey Grits Formation - both are assigned to the upper Devonian. The Plateau Beds sandstones occur across the whole southern aspect of the mountain and are often present as boulder fields, a result of periglacial activity. Several geological faults affect these rocks, the most significant of which is the northeast-southwest aligned Swansea Fault, a part of the Cribarth Disturbance.

== Access ==
The hill is entirely within access land and freely available to walkers. A private vehicular track which runs over the southeastern shoulder of neighbouring Fan Gyhirych affords the easiest and most commonly used ascent of Fan Fraith.
