= Afon Senni =

River in Powys, Wales

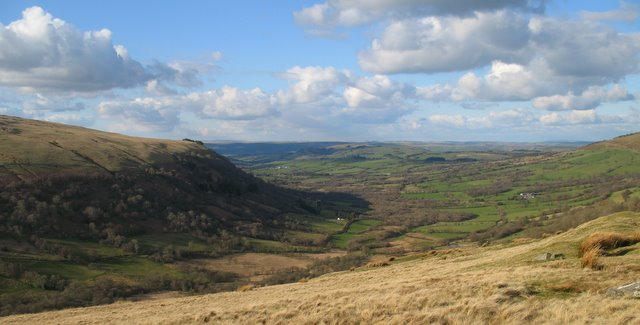
A view into the Senni Valley where the Afon Senni flows north eventually joining the Usk at Sennybridge

The Afon Senni is a river in Powys, Wales which rises in the Fforest Fawr section of the Brecon Beacons National Park and flows northwards for 11 kilometres (7 mi) to a confluence with the River Usk at Sennybridge.

The river rises as Blaen Senni to the north of the peak of Fan Nedd and east of Fan Gyhirych (51.8621°N 3.5931°W), occupying a deep glacial trough until it reaches the hamlet of Heol Senni. Before reaching Sennybridge (51.9455°N 3.5723°W), it flows past the village of Defynnog, where it is joined on its left bank by its sole significant tributary, the Nant Treweryn (or Treweren).

The river's name probably derives from a personal name 'Senni'.

The river is designated as a special area of conservation in respect of its population of three species of lamprey, twaite shad, European bullhead, Atlantic salmon and otter.
