= Crai =

Crai may refer to:

- Crai (village), Welsh village and community
  - Afon Crai, a river that runs through the Welsh community
- Crai (supermarket), Italian cooperative society
- Crai (record label), Wales
- Crai Nou, a village in Romania
