= Maen Llia =

Standing stone in the Brecon Beacons, Wales

Coordinates: 51°51′39″N 3°33′49″W

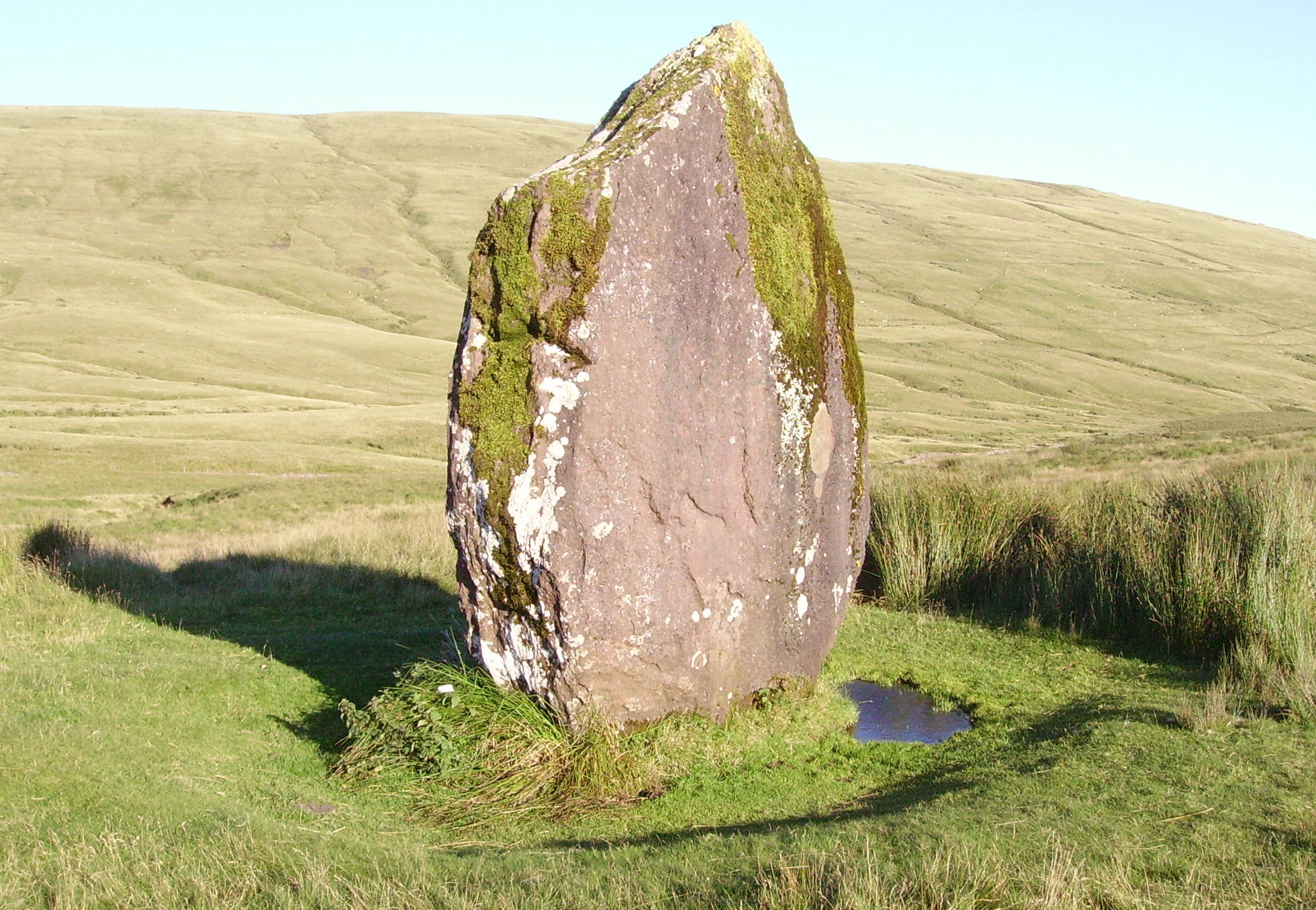
Maen Llia

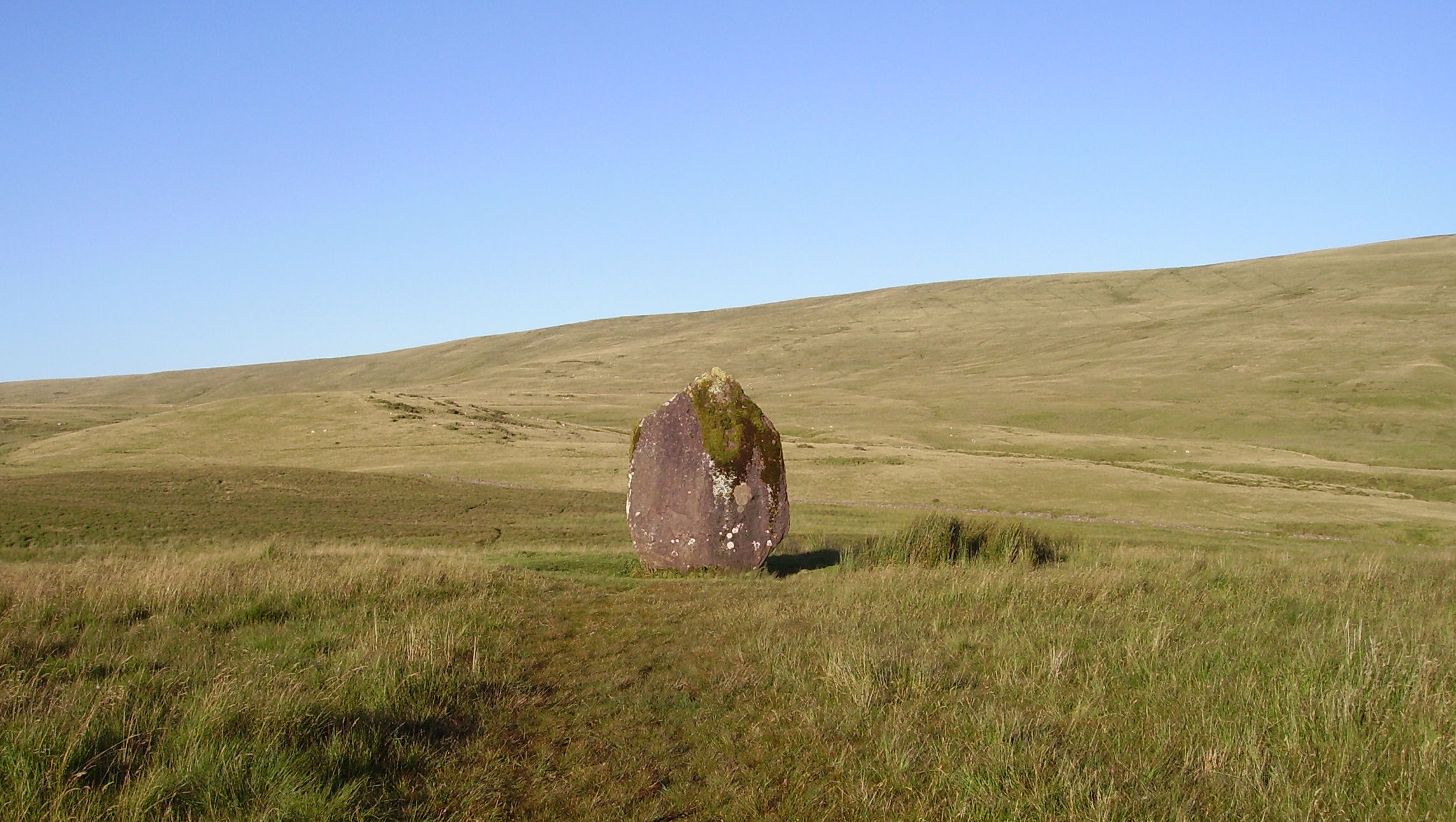
Maen Llia

Maen Llia is a standing stone which sits on moorland at grid reference SN924192 in the Brecon Beacons National Park in Powys, Wales.

The stone which is a large piece of intraformational conglomerate from the Old Red Sandstone measures 3.7 m (12 ft) high by 2.8 m (9 ft) wide by 0.9 m (3 ft). It is roughly diamond-shaped and is partly moss-covered. It sits on a purpose made stone and earth mound. It is thought to date from the Bronze Age or later Neolithic.

It is a popular tourist attraction, lying just 60 yards (55 m) off a minor road running north from the village of Ystradfellte in the Waterfall Country towards the hamlet of Heol Senni and Brecon, the county town of Brecknockshire.

There is a low heather-covered henge 240 metres (790 feet) to the southwest, a recumbent stone row 60 metres (200 feet) to the South, and a cairn 300 metres (1000 feet) to the South East, all of whom form a precise geometric pattern. This pattern contains some unique geometry not known to exist anywhere else in the world, although some aspects of it can be discerned at Stonehenge.

Another significant standing stone, Maen Madoc, lies just off the old Roman road known as Sarn Helen about 2 miles (3.5 km) to the south. Whilst this latter stone bears legible writing, there is none visible on Maen Llia though some faint lettering was reported still to be visible in the mid twentieth century.

Legend has it that the stone goes down to the river, the Afon Llia to drink on occasion. This tale seems likely to be an allusion to the fact that its shadow is cast across the moorland as far as the river when the sun is low in the evening sky. This occurs from April till September. On the day that the sunset shadow reaches the stream for the first and last time of the year (April/Sept), it's sunrise shadow touches a stone 90 feet to the East. This only happens on these two days.

There is good evidence to suggest that alignments within the geometric arrangements also match astronomical alignments, principally involving all the major and minor Lunar standstills. This has not, as of 2024, been definitively confirmed as yet. The modelled predictions would strongly favour this possibility. Further research is ongoing.

The stone is a Scheduled Ancient Monument.
