= Afon Llia =

River in Powys, Wales

Coordinates: 51°49′04″N 3°32′46″W

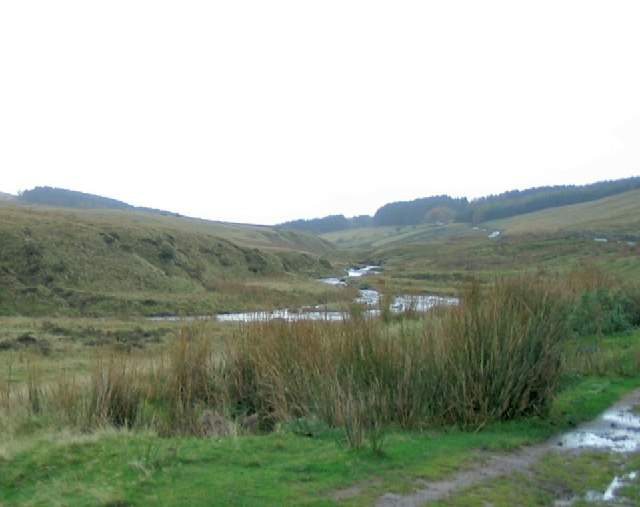
The river flowing southwards to Ystradfellte

Afon Llia is a short river in Powys, Wales, and which is wholly contained within the Brecon Beacons National Park.

Several streams draining the eastern slopes of Fan Nedd and the western slopes of Fan Dringarth in the Fforest Fawr section of the national park meet to form the river, which then flows southwards for 5 kilometres (3.1 mi) to its confluence with Afon Dringarth, the combined waters continuing south as Afon Mellte.

The name probably derives from the Welsh root lly– found in llyfu, llyo ('lick, lap') but it has probably been influenced by the local pronunciation of lleiaf ('smallest').

The river flows over ground formed from Old Red Sandstone rocks laid down during the Devonian period. The valley was inundated by ice during the last glacial period as evidenced by the low mounds of moraine present in the valley and through which the river has since cut.

== Historical route ==
The Llia valley provides one of the lower passes—summit height 446 metres (1,463 ft)—through the Old Red Sandstone escarpment which stretches from Llandeilo east to Abergavenny. The presence of a standing stone, Maen Llia, presumed to date from the Bronze Age near the valley head suggests that it has been used as an ancient trackway route for several thousand years. The Romans constructed a Roman road, Sarn Helen, between Neath and Brecon through this valley and the Swansea to Brecon turnpike was pushed through here in the 19th century. The remains of "Castell Coch" (the "red castle") sit in the fork between the Llia and the neighbouring Afon Dringarth.

There is a car park and picnic area provided by the Natural Resources Wales at Blaen Llia beside the river which provides a useful base for walkers wanting to explore the river, its valley and the adjacent peaks.
