= Fan Llia =

Mountain (631.9m) in Powys, Wales

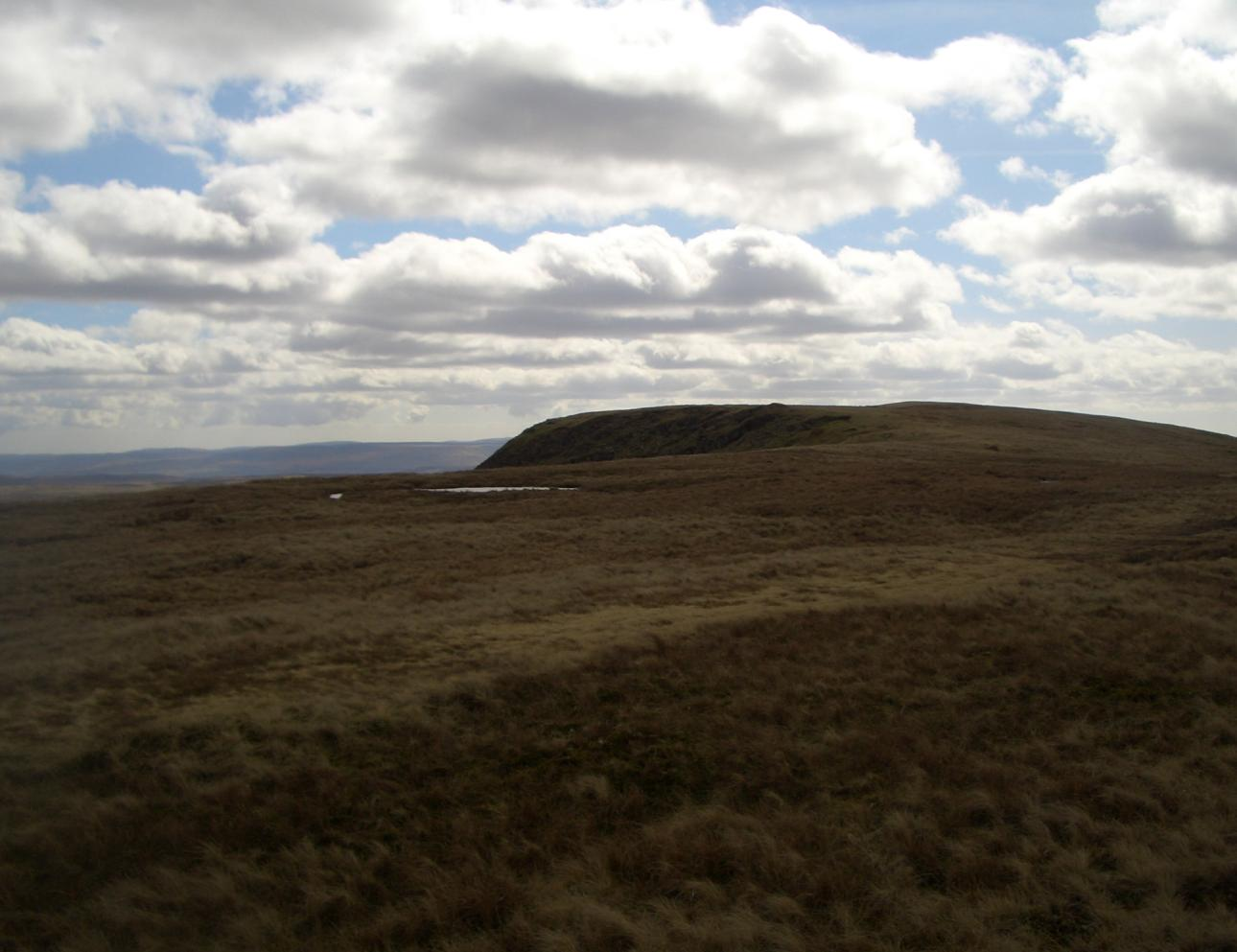
- The summit of Fan Llia

Highest point
- Elevation: 632 m (2,073 ft)
- Prominence: 100 m (330 ft)
- Parent peak: Fan Fawr
- Listing: HuMP, Hewitt, Nuttall
- Coordinates: 51.8561°N 3.5430°W

Naming
- English translation: (the) peak near (the stream called) Llia
- Language of name: Welsh

Geography
- Location: Powys, Wales
- Parent range: Brecon Beacons
- OS grid: SN937186
- Topo map: OS Landranger 160

Fan Llia is a subsidiary summit of Fan Fawr in the Fforest Fawr section of the Brecon Beacons National Park, Wales. In common with other peaks in the Fforest Fawr uplands it lies within the county of Powys.

The hill has the form of a broad ridge aligned south-south-west to north-north-east peaking at an altitude of 632 m. It has a subsidiary top to the north which is known as Fan Dringarth and which attains a height of 617 m. Its broad northern ridge is eventually truncated by the cliffs of Craig Cwm-du.

A number of features of archaeological interest are to be found on its flanks including several house platforms.

== Geology ==
The hill is formed largely from sandstones of the Brownstones Formation of the Old Red Sandstone dating from the Devonian period. Its southernmost slopes (around Cefn Perfedd) are formed in Plateau Beds Formation sandstones and an area in the north-east is underlain by sandstones and mudstones of the Senni Beds Formation. Rock exposures are infrequent − the hill being draped with glacial till and accumulations of peat. The most significant feature is a post-glacial landslip which extends from near the summit of Fan Dringarth down its eastern slopes almost to the Afon Dringarth and which may be responsible for the name of this subsidiary peak. Craig Cwm-du to the north hosted a small glacier in the ice age.

The hill is drained to the west by a number of streams flowing into the Afon Llia and to the east by streams flowing into the Afon Dringarth, part of which has been impounded directly to the east of the hill as Ystradfellte Reservoir. The hill is within the Fforest Fawr Geopark designated in 2005 in recognition of the area's geological heritage.

== Access ==
The entire hill is designated as open country so walkers may wander at will though most choose to ascend the hill from the Natural Resources Wales car park at Blaen Llia (OS grid ref SN 926165) just off the minor road between the villages of Ystradfellte and Heol Senni. This ridge route is also followed by the Beacons Way long-distance footpath.
