= Afon Dringarth =

River in Powys, Wales

Coordinates: 51°49′14″N 3°32′21″W

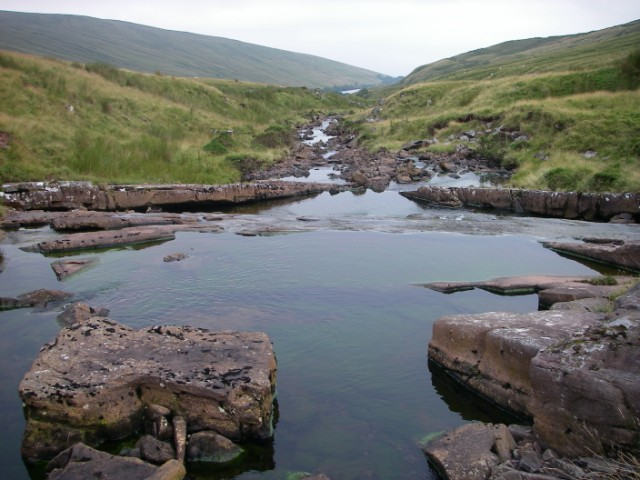
Pool on the Afon Dringarth

The Afon Dringarth (or simply Tringarth) is a river in Powys, Wales and wholly contained within the Brecon Beacons National Park. Its headwater streams drain the eastern slopes of Fan Dringarth (which is probably named after the river), the southern slopes of Craig Cerrig-gleisiad and the western slopes of Fan Fawr. The river flows south-southwest for about 6 km / 3.5 mi to its confluence with the Afon Llia one mile north of the village of Ystradfellte, continuing south as the Afon Mellte. The river may derive its name from the hill immediately to its west, Fan Dringarth.

The Afon Dringarth flows across ground formed from the Old Red Sandstone laid down during the Devonian period. The presence of areas of glacial till reveals that the area was inundated by ice during the ice ages. The waters of the river were impounded by a dam during the early 20th century to form Ystradfellte Reservoir.
