= Craig Cerrig-gleisiad and Fan Frynych National Nature Reserve =

Nature reserve in South Wales

Coordinates: 51.887°N 3.518°W

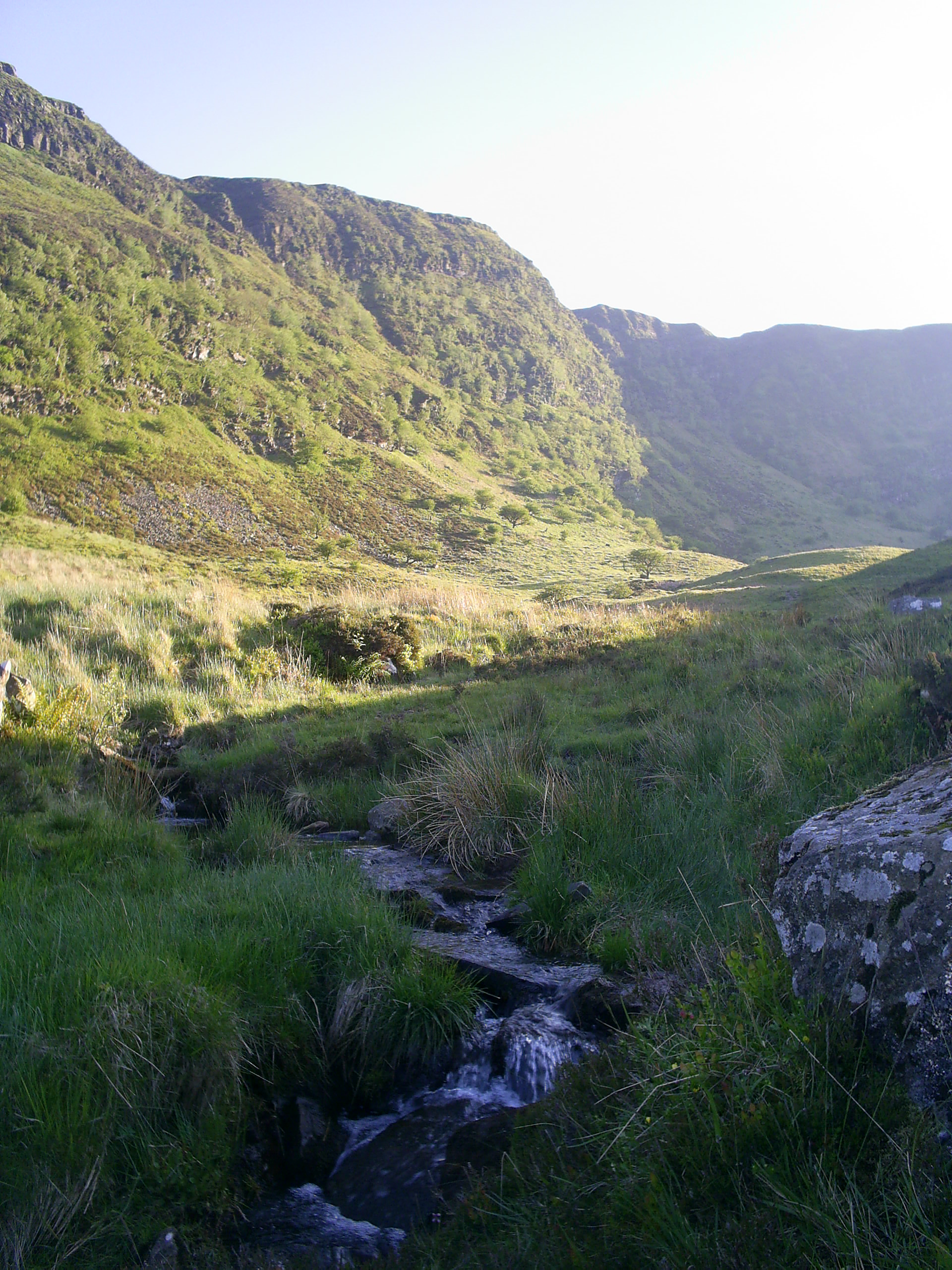
Impressive from below

Craig Cerrig-gleisiad and Fan Frynych National Nature Reserve is a 156 acre (631,000 m²) area of the Brecon Beacons National Park in South Wales.

It includes the peaks of Craig Cerrig-gleisiad (629 m: SN960217) and Fan Frynych (629 m: SN958227). Craig Cerrig-gleisiad means 'cliff of the salmon(-coloured) rocks' and is a cirque formed by a glacier which deposited moraine and created a sheltered environment where the steep crags prevent sheep from accessing the rare Arctic–alpine plants such as purple saxifrage and roseroot and mixed woodland where orchids and anemones flourish. There is scattered scrub woodland and scattered hawthorn on the lower slopes.

The national nature reserve, which is administered by Natural Resources Wales, the successor body to the Countryside Council for Wales, lies within the Fforest Fawr uplands, an area set aside in Norman times for hunting and which remained Crown property until the early nineteenth century.

In addition to the flora, there are relatively rare birds such as peregrine falcons, ring ouzels and ravens. Sixteen species of butterfly have been recorded in the area.
