= Fan Bwlch Chwyth =

Hill (603.2m) in Powys, Wales

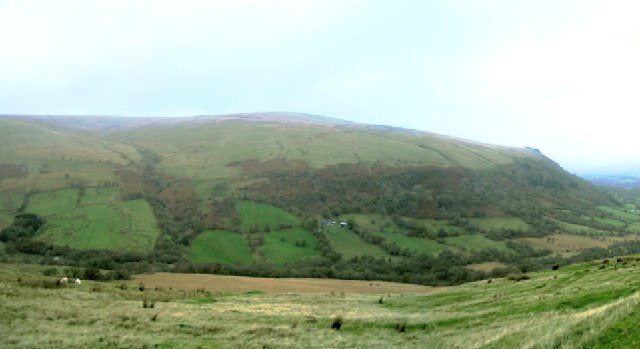
- Fan Bwlch Chwyth viewed from the south

Highest point
- Elevation: 603 m (1,978 ft)
- Prominence: 27.8 m (91 ft)
- Coordinates: 51°52′57″N 3°34′53″W

Geography
- Location: Powys, Wales
- Parent range: Brecon Beacons
- OS grid: SN912217

Fan Bwlch Chwyth is a peak in the Fforest Fawr section of the Brecon Beacons National Park and within the county of Powys.

Its summit (at 603 m) is marked by a trig point at OS grid ref SN 912217.

== Geology ==
The hill is formed from sandstones and mudstones of the Senni Beds Formation and Brownstones Formation of the Old Red Sandstone laid down during the Devonian period. A north-northwest - south-southeast trending fault runs across its north-eastern face.

This face is much the steepest and has its origins in the ice ages when a minor glacier grew at this spot. It has left a couple of arcuate moraines which are readily seen from the track. The glaciated rock face has been quarried. The quarry is designated as a site of special scientific interest for its geological interest.

== Access ==
The entire hill is open country across which the walker can wander at will. A bridleway runs south-eastward from the minor road between Heol Senni and the A4067 road. The bridleway follows, in part at least, the vehicular track (no public vehicular access) to the disused quarry.
