= Fan Fawr =

Mountain (734m) in Powys, Wales

Coordinates: 51.8635°N 3.4988°W

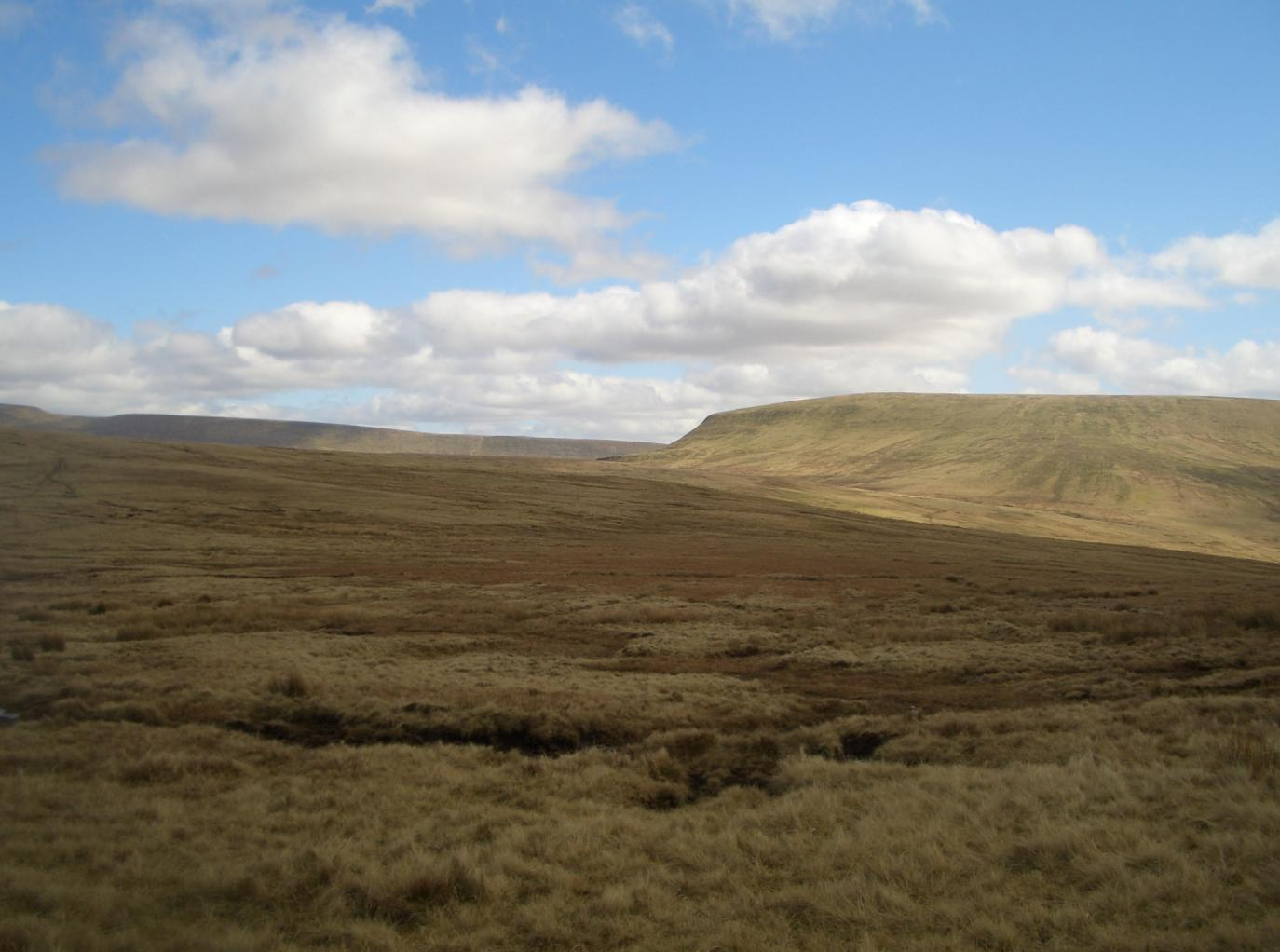
- Fan Fawr from near Fan Llia

Highest point
- Elevation: 734 m (2,408 ft)
- Prominence: 295 m (968 ft)
- Parent peak: Pen y Fan
- Listing: Marilyn, Hewitt, Nuttall

Naming
- English translation: great peak
- Language of name: Welsh
- Pronunciation: Welsh: [ˈvan ˈvau̯r]

Geography
- Location: Powys, Wales
- Parent range: Brecon Beacons
- OS grid: SN969193
- Topo map: OS Landranger 160

Listed summits of Fan Fawr
Name	Grid ref	Height	Status
Fan Llia	SN969193	632 metres (2,073 ft)	Hewitt, Nuttall
Fan Frynych	SN969193	629 metres (2,064 ft)	Hewitt, Nuttall
Craig Cerrig-gleisiad	SN969193	629 metres (2,064 ft)	Hewitt, Nuttall

Fan Fawr (Welsh for 'great peak') (Welsh: [ˈvan ˈvau̯r]) is a mountain in the Fforest Fawr section of the Brecon Beacons National Park, in Powys, Wales and over 734 m (2,408 ft) high.

The summit overlooks the steep eastern face and is marked by a cairn. Unusually, the trig point on this hill does not sit at the summit but 600 m to the south-west on a subsidiary spur. The hill is drained to the west by streams flowing into the Afon Dringarth and to the east by streams draining into the Taf Fawr. The Dringarth is dammed to the west to form Ystradfellte Reservoir as is the Taf Fawr east of the hill to form Beacons Reservoir. To the north-east water flows into the Afon Tarell, a tributary of the River Usk whilst to the south the headwaters of the Afon y Waun conduct water to the Afon Hepste and eventually to the River Neath.

== Geology ==
The hill is largely formed from sandstones of the Brownstones Formation of the Old Red Sandstone which were laid down during the Devonian period. On the southern slopes of the hill, sandstones of the overlying Plateau Beds Formation occur. In common with other hills in the Brecon Beacons National Park Fan Fawr was subject to glacial action in the ice ages. The western cwm contains a fine late-glacial moraine known as Cefn Bach. The hill is within the Fforest Fawr Geopark designated in 2005 in recognition of the area's geological heritage.

== Access ==
The entire hill is open country, enabling walkers to wander at will, although most choose to take a line up from the car parks beside the A470 at Storey Arms and Pont ar Daf.
