= Craig Cerrig-gleisiad =

Mountain (629m) in Powys, Wales

Coordinates: 51.8635°N 3.4988°W

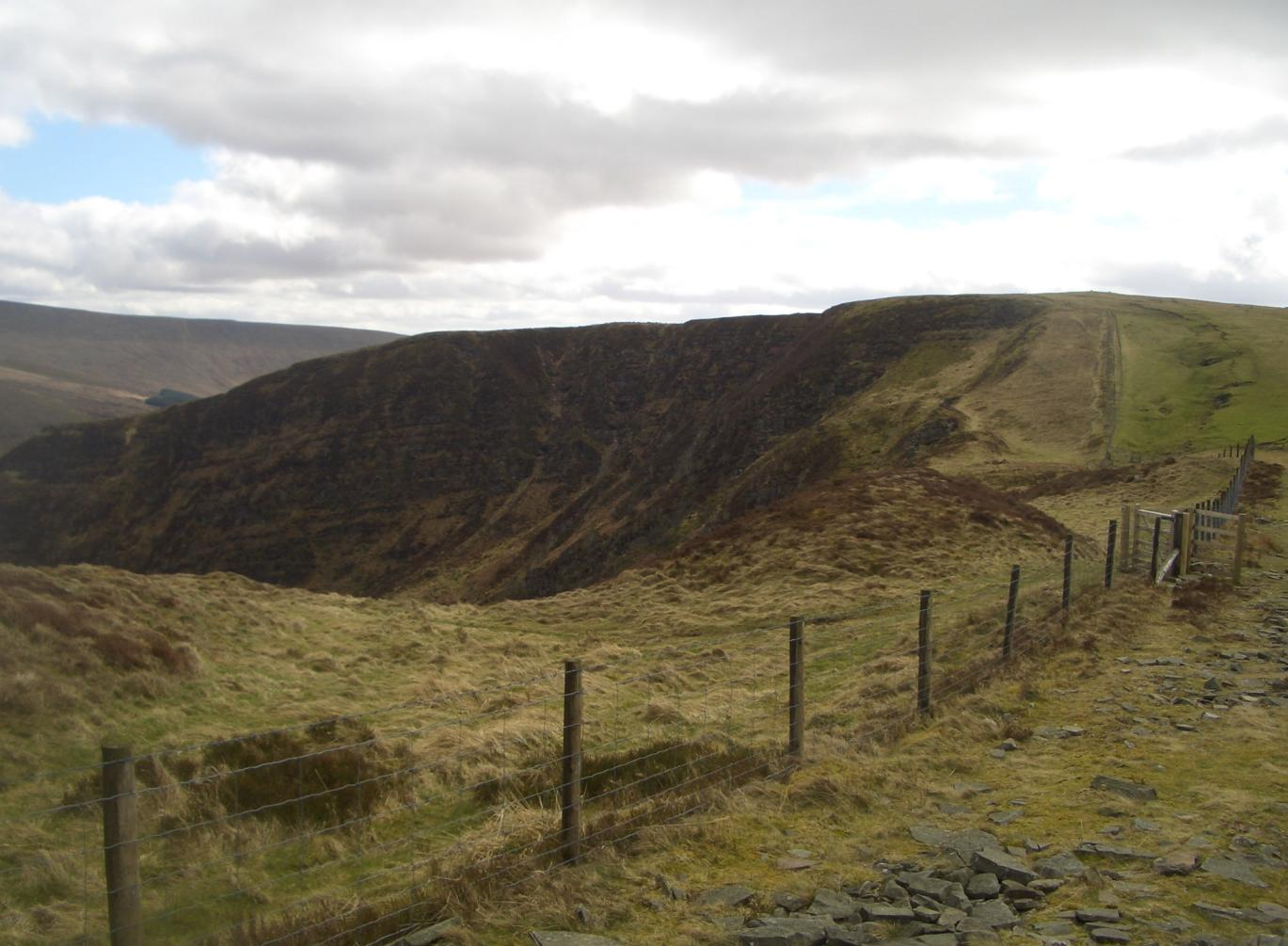
- Craig Cerrig-gleisiad from Fan Frynych

Highest point
- Elevation: 629 m (2,064 ft)
- Prominence: 46 m (151 ft)
- Parent peak: Fan Fawr
- Listing: Hewitt, Nuttall

Naming
- Language of name: Welsh

Geography
- Location: Powys, United Kingdom
- Parent range: Brecon Beacons
- OS grid: SN969193
- Topo map: OS Landranger 160

Craig Cerrig-gleisiad is a subsidiary summit of Fan Fawr in the Fforest Fawr section of the Brecon Beacons National Park, South Wales. It makes up half of the Craig Cerrig-gleisiad and Fan Frynych National Nature Reserve with its sister peak Fan Frynych.

The summit is marked by a pile of stones, and sits on the edge of steep north facing cliffs which provide one of the few habitats for Arctic–alpine plants this far south in the British Isles. To the south-west is Fan Llia.

Video of Craig Cerrig-gleisiad

== Geology ==
The outstanding feature of the mountain is the L-shaped glacial cwm which faces to the northeast. Its modern form is considered to be the result of a complex history of both glacial action and rock-slope failure, a portion of the west wall having collapsed after the main part of the last ice age. Some of the debris was re-worked during the Loch Lomond Stadial and parts stretch as far as the A470 road. The rocks exposed in the main crag are Senni Beds of Devonian Old Red Sandstone, topped with Brownstones.

The ledges of the main crag to the south have been a favoured nesting site for peregrine falcons.
