= Fan Frynych =

Mountain (628.3m) in Powys, Wales

Coordinates: 51.8635°N 3.4988°W

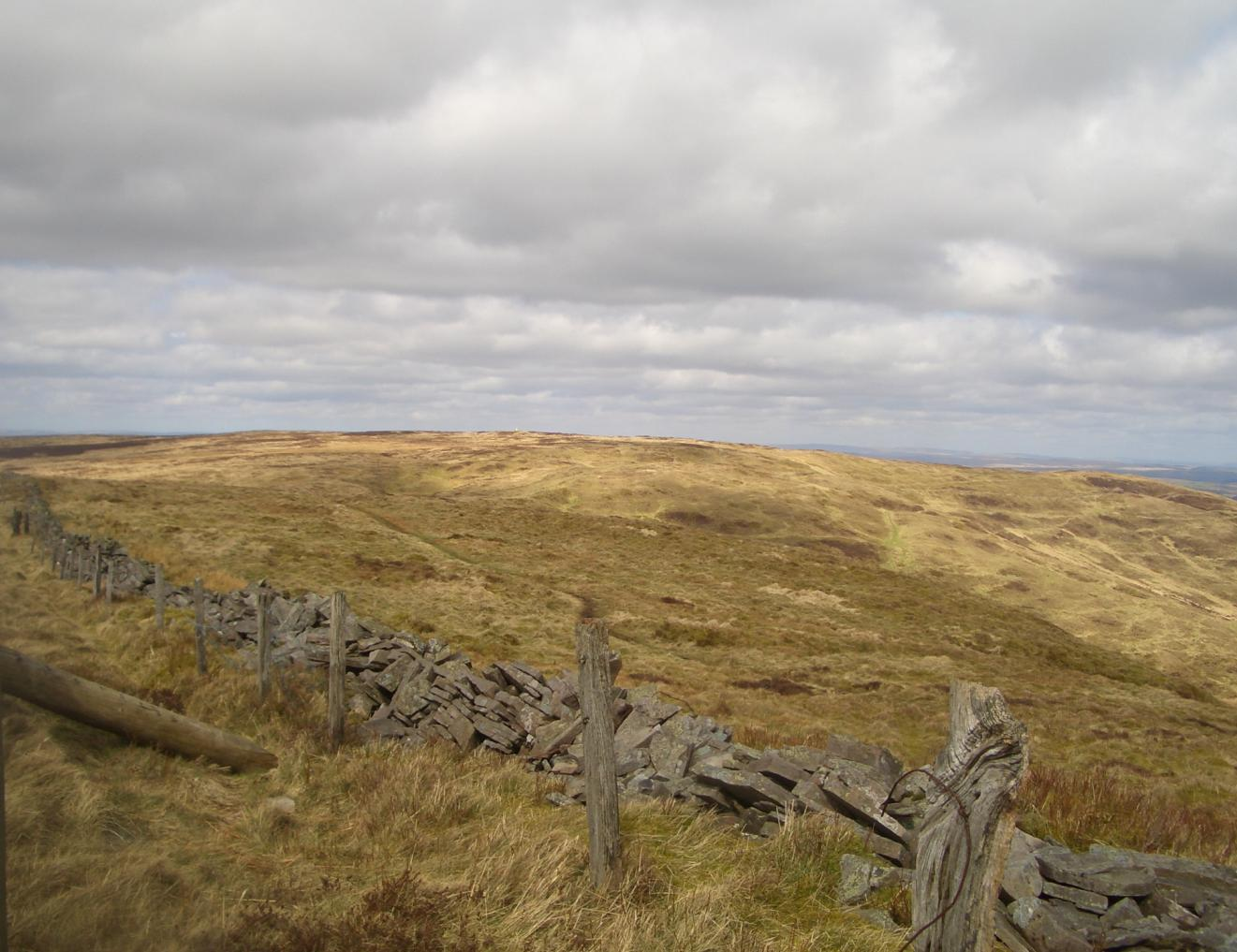
- Fan Frynych from the summit of Craig Cerrig-gleisiad

Highest point
- Elevation: 629 m (2,064 ft)
- Prominence: 74 m (243 ft)
- Parent peak: Fan Fawr
- Listing: Hewitt, Nuttall

Naming
- Language of name: Welsh

Geography
- Location: Powys, United Kingdom
- Parent range: Brecon Beacons
- OS grid: SN969193
- Topo map: OS Landranger 160

Fan Frynych is the northernmost peak of the Fforest Fawr massif in the Brecon Beacons National Park, South Wales. It is classed as a subsidiary summit of Fan Fawr and makes up half of the Craig Cerrig-gleisiad and Fan Frynych National Nature Reserve with its sister peak Craig Cerrig-gleisiad.

The summit is marked by a trig point, where the northern face of Craig Cerrig-gleisiad can be viewed.

== Geology ==
The upper parts of the mountain are formed from brown-coloured sandstones of the Senni Formation. At lower level and hence older, and forming the lower northern slopes, though largely unseen, are the mudstones of the St Maughans Formation. Both are units of the Lower Old Red Sandstone of early Devonian age. Though locally variable, the rock strata dip generally towards the southeast. The northeastern flank of the mountain is defined by a NE-SW aligned geological fault, the Cribarth Fault downthrowing to the southeast, which forms a part of the Swansea Valley Disturbance. Large parts of the mountain's eastern flanks are affected by landslips.

== Access ==
Being 'mountain' and/or 'moor', the entire mountain is mapped as open country and hence freely available to walkers under the access provisions of the CROW Act 2000. A network of paths and tracks cross its summit plateau and link with public rights of way to east, west and north. The 99 mile Beacons Way passes over Craig Cerrig-gleisiad immediately to its south, affording views over Fan Frynych's southern slopes and connecting with a path running the length of the east side of the plateau.
