= Ystradfellte Reservoir =

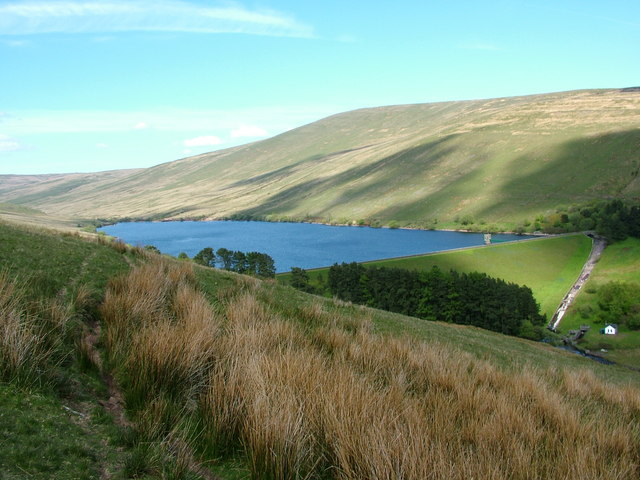
- A view of Ystradfellte Reservoir

- Location within Wales
- Location: Wales
- Coordinates: 51.849°N 3.530°W
- Type: reservoir
- Primary inflows: Afon Mellte / River Mellte
- Primary outflows: Afon Mellte / River Mellte
- Catchment area: 2.3 km^{2} (570 acres)
- Basin countries: Wales
- Max. length: 1,220 metres (4,000 ft)
- Max. width: 66 m (217 ft)
- Surface area: 200 acres (81 ha)
- Average depth: 30 ft (9.1 m)
- Max. depth: 132 ft (40 m)
- Water volume: 40,000,000 imp gal (180,000 m^{3})
- Surface elevation: 441 m (1,447 ft)

Ystradfellte Reservoir is a water storage reservoir on the Afon Dringarth in the upland area of Fforest Fawr within the Brecon Beacons National Park in South Wales. It lies just north of the village of Ystradfellte in the county of Powys at OS Grid ref SN 946178.

The embankment is 920 feet (280 m) long by 114 feet (35 m) high. When full the water surface is 1,204 feet (367 m) above sea level.

== Construction ==
The reservoir was constructed between 1907 and 1914 by Neath Rural District Council for the supply of water. A temporary railway track was constructed for 7 miles (11 km) from the village of Penderyn to transport building materials to the dam site. Limestone was obtained from Penderyn Quarry and puddle clay was excavated from the glacial till at nearby Cilhepste Coed. Sandstone may have been sourced from Gwaun Hepste just east of Ystradfellte. The railway required the construction across the Afon Hepste of a 300 feet (91 m) long, 50 feet (15 m) high wooden viaduct.
