= Crai, Powys =

Village and community in Powys, Wales

Crai
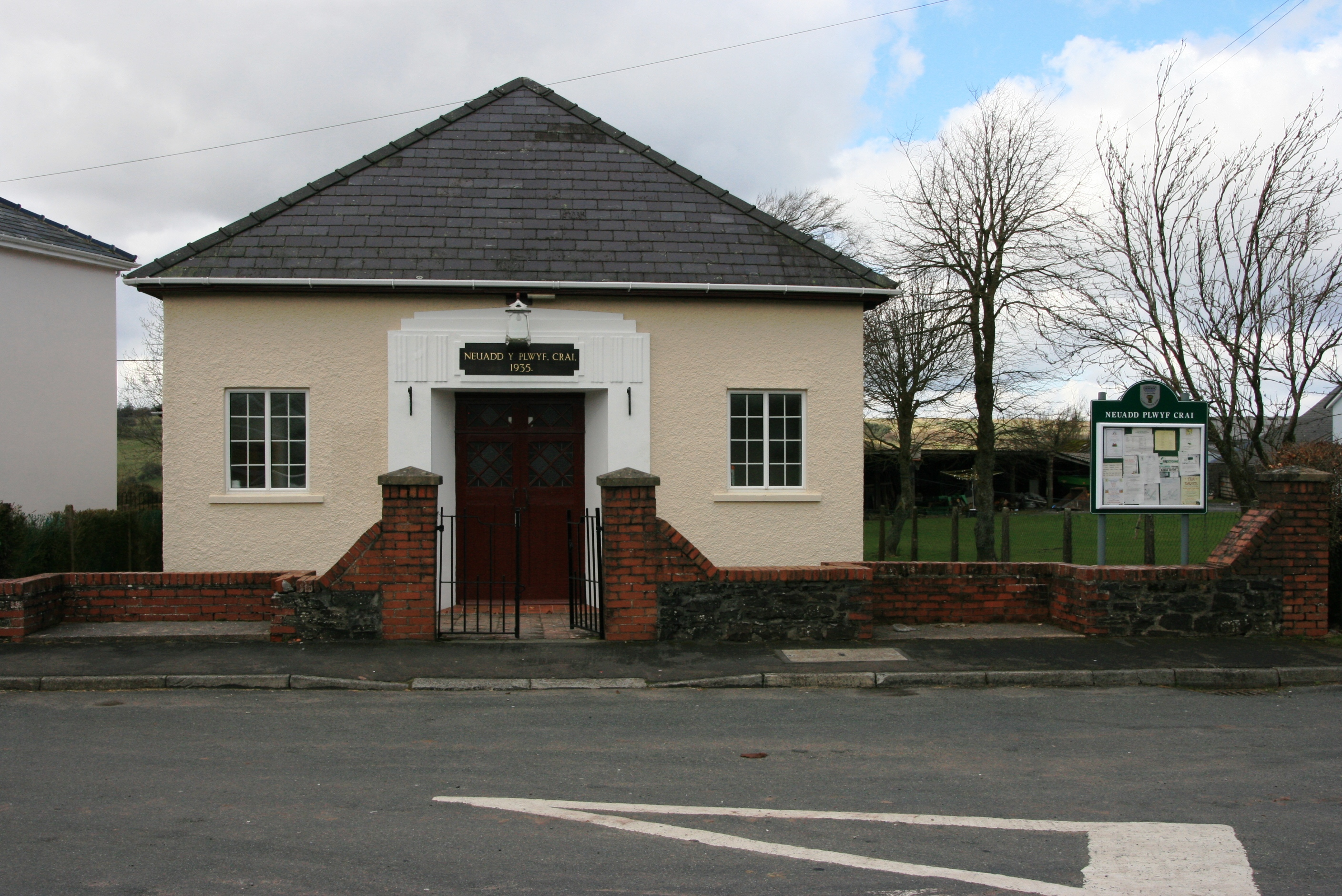
- Crai village hall

- Location within Powys
- OS grid reference: SN625515
- Principal area: Powys
- Preserved county: Powys
- Country: Wales
- Sovereign state: United Kingdom
- Post town: BRECON
- Postcode district: LD3
- Police: Dyfed-Powys
- Fire: Mid and West Wales
- Ambulance: Welsh
- UK Parliament: Brecon, Radnor and Cwm Tawe
- Senedd Cymru – Welsh Parliament: Brecon and Radnorshire
- List of places UK Wales Powys 51.907°N 3.606°W Community map: Map of the community

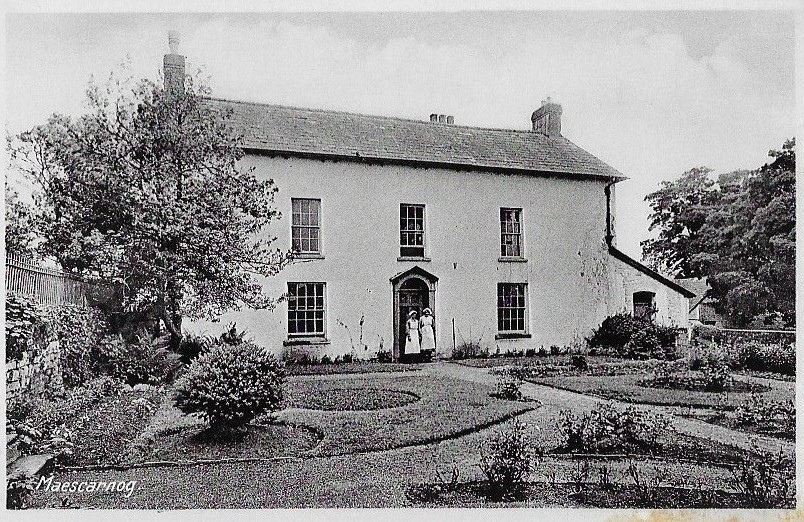
Old postcard photograph of Maescarnog, Crai, Breconshire (Dr Rhobert Lewis, Brecon)

Crai, also spelled as Cray, is a village and community in the county of Powys, Wales. It is within the Brecon Beacons National Park and historically in Brecknockshire. The population of the community at the 2011 census was 241, and includes the village of Crai, the hamlet of Felin-Crai, and many dispersed farms around the valley of the Afon Crai. The river is dammed 2 km / 1.5 mi southwest of the village to form Crai Reservoir. Crai means fresh, raw water. The famous Llywel Stone (see Llywel) was found close to the Crai/Trecastle boundary. A history of the village is contained in Lewis, D. Craionog: Hanes plwyf Defynog : yn cynnwys y rhanbarthau cynlynol; Crai, Glyntawy, Senni, Glyntarell, a Maescar. Merthyr Tydfil : H. W. Southey a'i Feibion, Cyf, Argrffwyr, 1911.
