= Fan Gyhirych =

Mountain (725m) in Powys, Wales

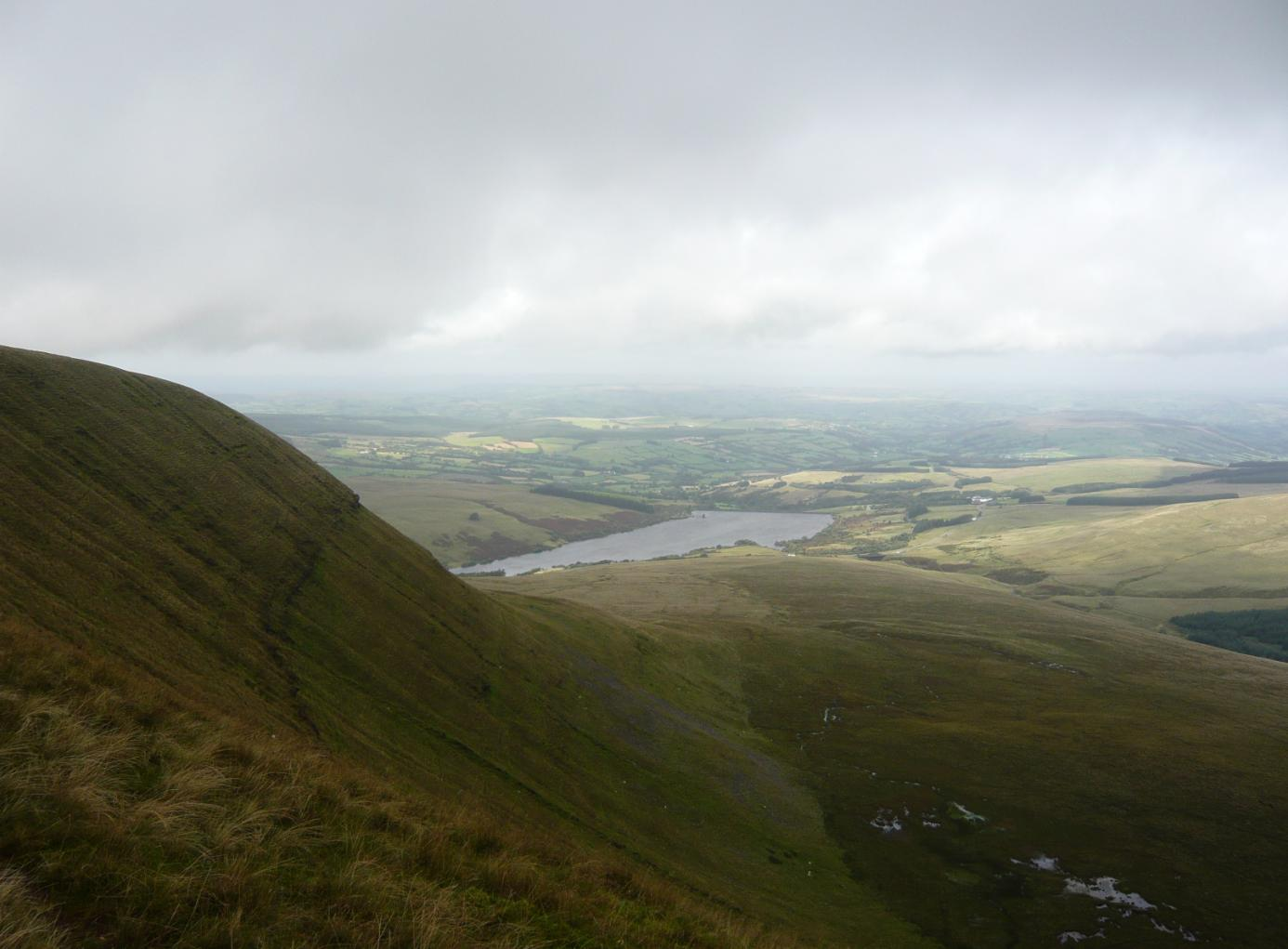
- The north face of Fan Gyhirych with Crai reservoir beyond

Highest point
- Elevation: 725 m (2,379 ft)
- Prominence: 280 m (920 ft)
- Parent peak: Pen y Fan
- Listing: Marilyn, Hewitt, Nuttall
- Coordinates: 51.8590°N 3.6270°W

Naming
- Language of name: Welsh

Geography
- Location: Powys, Wales
- Parent range: Brecon Beacons
- Topo map: OS Landranger 160

Listed summits of Fan Gyhirych
Name	Grid ref	Height	Status
Fan Fraith	SN969193	668 metres (2,192 ft)	Nuttall
Yr Allt	SN969193	604 metres (1,982 ft)	sub Hewitt

Fan Gyhirych is a mountain in the Fforest Fawr section of Brecon Beacons National Park in south Wales. It lies within the county of Breconshire, and administered as part of the unitary authority of Powys.

Its highest point at 2379 feet (or 725 m) is marked by a trig point which is located towards the western side of the summit plateau. The hill drains to the north into the catchment of the Afon Crai and to the south and west into that of the River Tawe. Fan Fraith is a nearby hill which can be considered a subsidiary top of Fan Gyhirych.

== Geology ==
The hill is formed largely from sandstones of the Brownstones Formation of the Old Red Sandstone laid down during the Devonian period. A part of the summit plateau is capped by sandstones of the overlying Plateau Beds Formation which also occur on the nearby peak of Fan Fraith. The Cribarth Disturbance, a north-east to south-west aligned zone of faulting and folding, passes through the hill. The hill's finest feature is its north-eastern cwm which held a small glacier during the ice ages. The hill is within the Fforest Fawr Geopark designated in 2005 in recognition of the area's geological heritage.

== History ==
Along the lower western flanks of the hill, entrepreneur John Christie ran the Brecon Forest Tramroad in the early part of the nineteenth century. Two lines of this can be seen to diverge from near their crossing of the Nant Gyhirych on the northern side of the hill. Subsequently, the Neath and Brecon Railway was constructed following the lower tramway route in part. This line closed in the 1960s.

== Access ==
The entire hill is open country giving walkers the freedom to wander at will though most choose to use a vehicular track which ascends its broad south ridge and skirts the summit area to head down the hill's broad eastern ridge.

== SOTA ==
The mountain has a Summits On The Air (SOTA) reference of GW/SW-006
