= Maen Madoc =

Standing stone in Ystradfellte Community, Powys, Wales

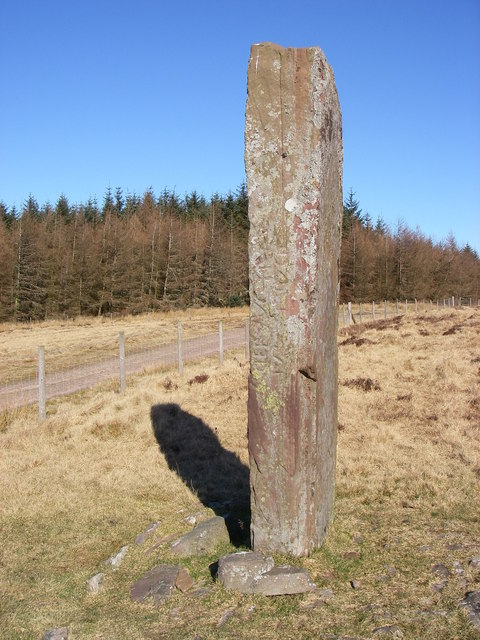
- Maen Madoc, with a modern track on the line of the Roman road Sarn Helen on the left of the image

- Location within Powys
- 51.82940°N 3.57154°W
- Type: Standing stone
- Periods: Early Medieval
- Location: Ystradfellte, Powys, Wales

The Maen Madoc or Maen Madog stone is a menhir which lies adjacent to the Roman road Sarn Helen that runs across the Brecon Beacons in what was a key area of Roman Wales, about one mile (2 km) north of Ystradfellte. It stands approximately 10 feet high.

It is thought to have marked a late Roman - post-Roman Christian burial – the stone is inscribed on one side, the Latin inscription reading DERVAC(IVS) FILIVS IVSTI (H)IC IACIT – "Of Dervacus, Son of Justus. He lies here".

Though the stone is named after a Madoc, nothing is known of the Madoc referred to. The base of stone is surrounded by deeply embedded stones. The stone was first recorded in 1805 as recumbent, re-erected in the 19th century, and was excavated and re-erected in 1940. Excavations undertaken at the time showed that the stone had previously been sited at the edge of the Roman road, with no grave associated.

Maen Madoc can be found at SN918157 on the Brecon Beacons West and Central map.

It has been recorded by the Royal Commission on Ancient and Historical Monuments in Wales (NPRN 84540), Early Christian Monuments in Wales ECM 8, and Clwyd-Powys Archaeological Trust Historic Environment Record Primary Record Number 825.

It is designated as a Scheduled Ancient Monument.
