= Fforest Fawr =

Upland area in Powys, Wales

Coordinates: 51°51′N 3°35′W

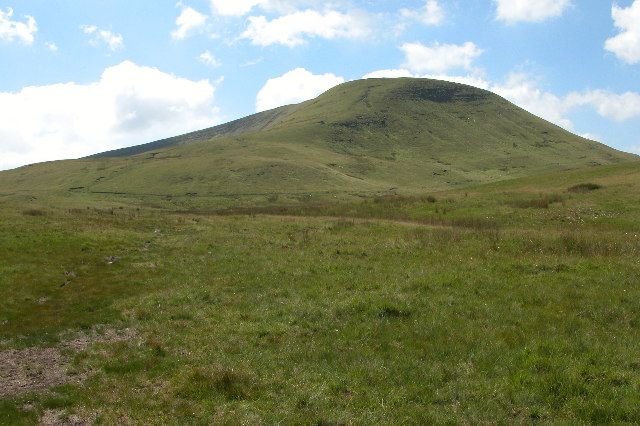
Fan Fawr is the highest summit in the Fforest Fawr area

Fforest Fawr (Welsh pronunciation: [ˌfɔrɛst ˈvau̯r], transl. "great forest") is an extensive upland area in the county of Powys, Wales. Formerly known as the Great Forest of Brecknock in English, it was a royal hunting area for several centuries but is now used primarily for sheep grazing, forestry, water catchment and recreation. It lies within the Brecon Beacons National Park.

== Extent ==
The area extends from the edge of the Black Mountain in the west eastwards to the A470 Brecon to Merthyr Tydfil road, just west of the Brecon Beacons themselves. It includes the peaks of Fan Fawr (734 m), Fan Frynych (629 m), Craig Cerrig-gleisiad (629 m), Fan Llia (632 m), Fan Nedd (663 m), Fan Gyhirych (725 m), Fan Bwlch Chwyth (603 m) and Cefn Cul (562 m). Traditionally Fforest Fawr also included the peaks of Fan Hir and Fan Brycheiniog, although the modern recreational use of the name tends to be restricted to the area east of the Black Mountain of which they form a part.

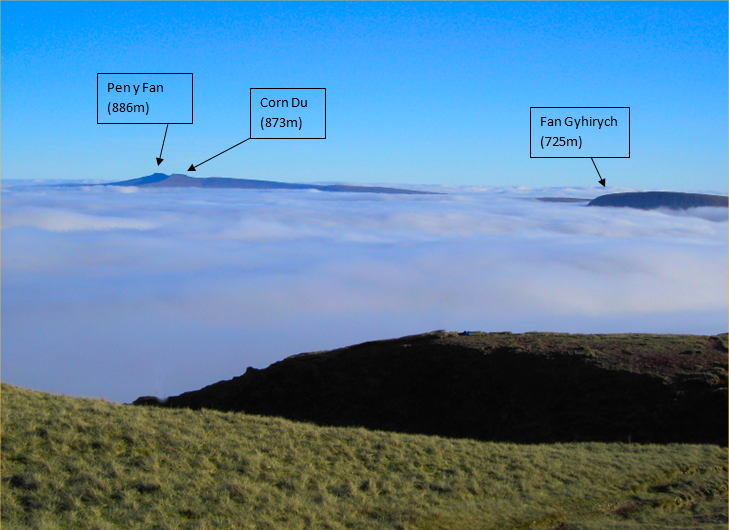
Fan Gyhirych is one of the highest summits in the Fforest Fawr area

== Geology ==
The area is largely underlain by sandstones and mudstones of the Old Red Sandstone, of which the more resistant sandstone beds, the Brownstones Formation give rise to the major peaks.

To the south of the main peaks are two more broken north-facing scarps, that of the Carboniferous Limestone and, to its south, that of the Twrch Sandstone, formerly known as (and still commonly referred to as) the Basal Grit of the Millstone Grit. These three suites of rock all dip southwards into the regionally important South Wales Coalfield basin.

The area is criss-crossed by faults which fall into two groups. Two major faults which are closely associated with tight folding of the rocks through which they pass, constitute one group. These are known as the Cribarth and Neath Disturbances. They run north-east to south-west through the area and are usually associated with the Variscan orogeny though the origins of these weaknesses in the Earth's crust can perhaps be ascribed to the earlier Caledonian Orogeny. The second set of faults form something of a swarm which run north-northwest to south-southeast and are most apparent within the limestone and Millstone Grit outcrop.

The area was glaciated during the ice ages and at least three glacial cirques are evident, of which Craig Cerrig-gleisiad is the most dramatic. At both this location and on the eastern slopes of Fan Dringarth are spectacular landslips.

== Archaeology ==
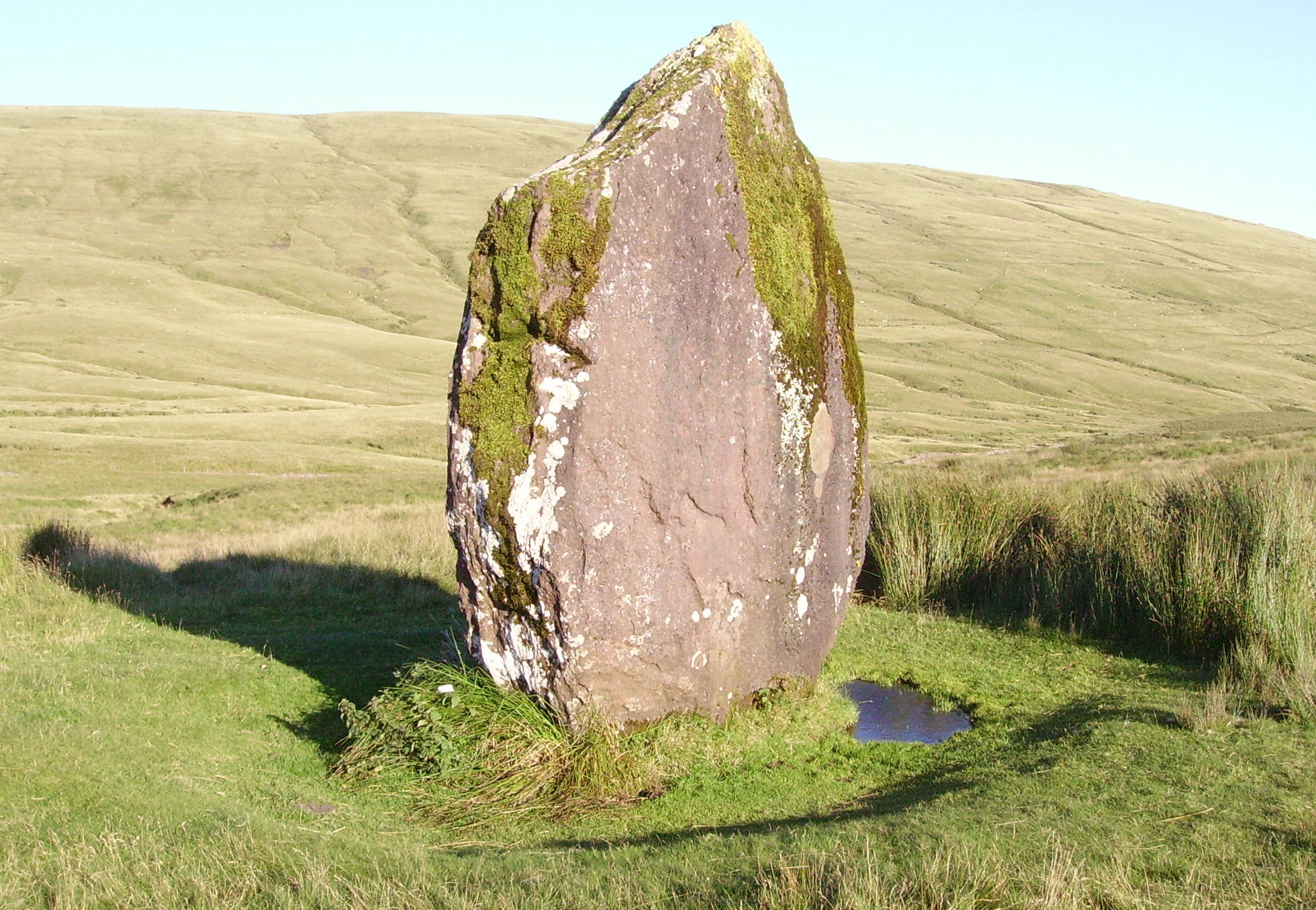
Maen Llia a prehistoric standing stone

There are many extant prehistoric monuments in the area, and especially two famous standing stones, Maen Llia and Maen Madoc, both of which stand near to the Roman road of Sarn Helen. There are also remains of hut circles, stone circles, stone rows and other traces of habitation such as hut platforms and pillow mounds. The mounds are the large remains of former attempts to farm rabbits on the moorland. There are also round barrows visible usually as cairns sometimes on the peak summits, such as that on Fan Gyhirych but also elsewhere on what is now wild moorland. They are mainly of British Bronze Age date of 2000 BC and sometimes earlier, although few have been excavated scientifically. The cairn on Fan Foel excavated in 2002-4 showed a central cist with the ashes and bones of a woman and two children of date about 2000 BC with a possible wreath of meadowsweet flowers.

== History ==
Although it is an area of open moorland today, it was much more wooded in the past; but that is not the meaning of "Fforest" in the name. In the Middle Ages, "forest" referred to land demarcated for hunting, with the right to hunt animals there restricted to the local lord (cf. Radnor Forest and New Forest). Bernard de Neufmarche, Norman lord of Brecon, established the forest around 1100. In the 13th century, another part of the highland was added, to the SW of Sennybridge; the two were distinguished by the names Fforest Fach (Little Forest) and Fforest Fawr (Great Forest).

Following the Norman Conquest the area was owned by the Lord of Brecon, Bernard de Neufmarche, eventually passing into the possession of the Crown in 1521. It was sold by the Crown in 1819 to raise funds depleted by the cost of the Napoleonic Wars. The entrepreneur John Christie purchased some of this land and subsequently constructed a tramroad across the area from Sennybridge to Ystradgynlais in an effort to improve agricultural production though the venture ran into financial difficulties.

Parts of the area, notably on the flanks of Cefn Cul above Cray Reservoir, were set aside during the 19th century for rabbit breeding for both fur and meat. 'Pillow mounds' remain as the most obvious sign of this venture. These long low earth mounds were constructed to allow the animals to burrow in what were otherwise thin soils.

Since October 2005 it has formed the core of the Fforest Fawr Geopark, the first Geopark in Wales and one of several areas in the UK designated for their outstanding geological heritage.

== Modern land use ==
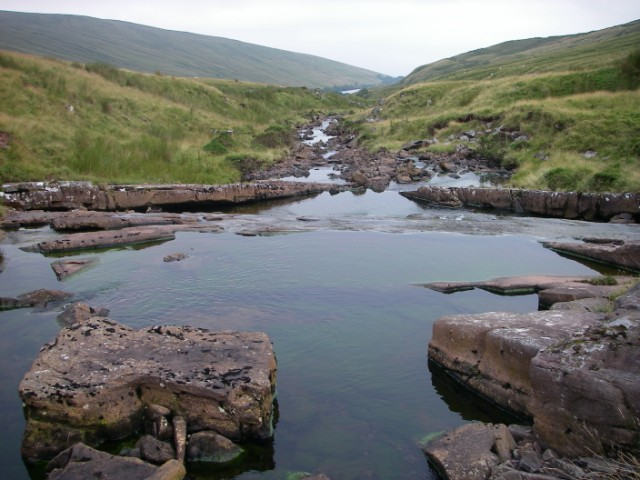
Afon Dringarth before it enters the Ystradfellte Reservoir

The waters of the southerly-flowing Afon Dringarth have been impounded between Fan Fawr and Fan Llia as Ystradfellte Reservoir. The headwaters of the northerly-flowing Afon Crai are stored in Cray Reservoir immediately west of the A4067 Ystradgynlais to Sennybridge road.

There are numerous conifer plantations on both the northern and southern slopes of Fforest Fawr.

Fan Frynych and Craig Cerrig-gleisiad are protected as a national nature reserve which is owned and managed by Natural Resources Wales for its Arctic–alpine flora.

Almost the entire area is open access for walkers. Two major long-distance paths, the Beacons Way and the Cambrian Way, run east–west through Fforest Fawr.
