= Afon Crai =

River in Wales

Coordinates: 51°56′53″N 3°36′03″W

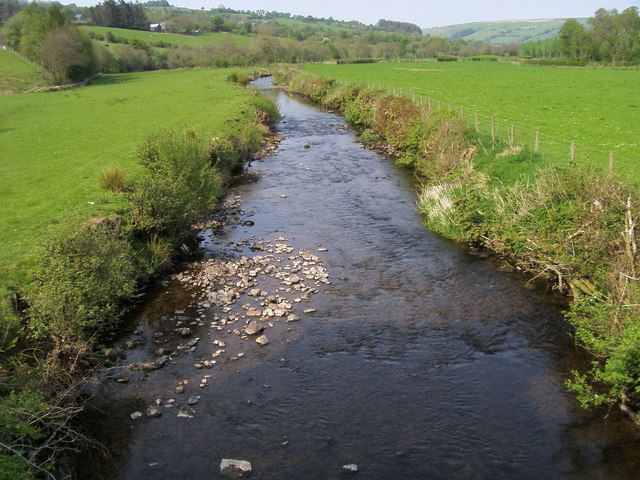
Afon Crai from the Pont Felin-crai

The Afon Crai is a river in Powys, Wales rising in the Fforest Fawr section of the Brecon Beacons National Park and flowing north into the River Usk. The headwaters known as Blaen-crai flow north from Bwlch Bryn-rhudd, a col between the Crai valley and the upper Swansea Valley for 2 km into the Cray Reservoir. The river emerges from below the dam to flow a further 8 km through the dispersed settlement of Crai (or 'Cray').

In common with other tributaries of the River Usk and the Usk itself, the Afon Crai is designated as a special area of conservation for its three species of lamprey, twaite shad, European bullhead, Atlantic salmon and otter.
