= Crai Reservoir =

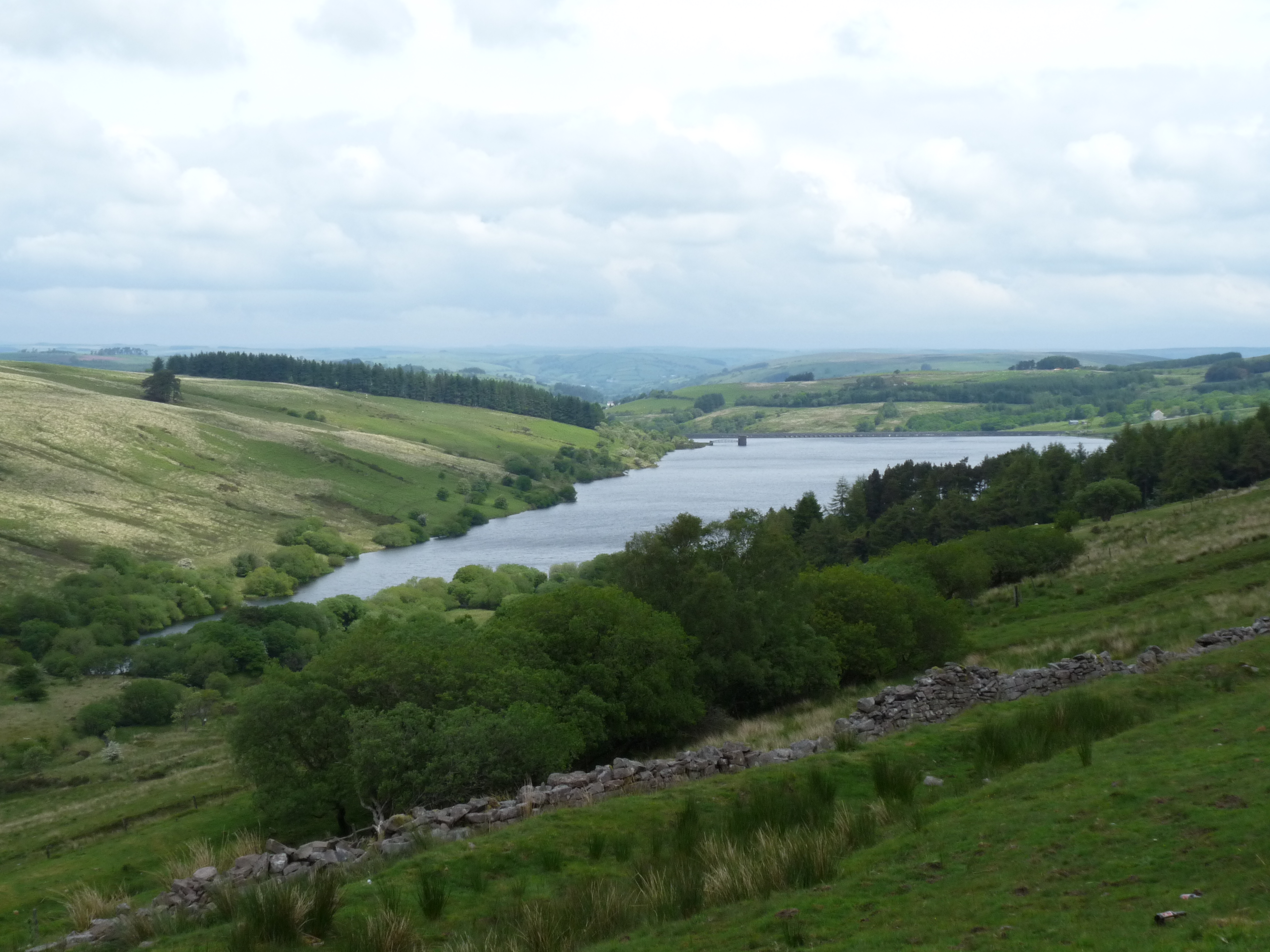
- Looking north-east from a lay-by on the A4067

- Location within Wales
- Location: Wales
- Coordinates: 51°52′50″N 3°37′30″W
- Type: Reservoir
- Basin countries: United Kingdom

Crai Reservoir (also known as Cray Reservoir) is a storage reservoir located in the Brecon Beacons National Park (named after the village of Crai) for the water supply to the city of Swansea in South Wales and was built between 1898 and 1908 by Swansea Corporation.

The reservoir now supplies water to the towns in the valley of the River Tawe and north Swansea.

The reservoir is one of several established in what is now the Brecon Beacons National Park, an area of Old Red Sandstone peaks with relatively high rainfall. The 28-metre high dam is within a wide glaciated valley and is estimated to impound some 1,007,000,000 gallons of water. The structure is believed to have been made from over 10 million bricks.

Upstream of Crai Reservoir the land is largely upland moorlands or unimproved grassland with one area now given over to coniferous forestry. The impounded water quality is good and the water requires only minimal treatment before entering the water supply system. The treatment of screening, disinfection and lime dosing is carried out south of the reservoir at Nant yr Wydd.

Despite the generally excellent quality of the water, there have been occasional episodes of impaired quality mostly concerned with forestry planting and the release of difficult to treat turbidity into the reservoir. On occasions when such raw water quality impairment has overwhelmed the treatment facilities, some bacteriological deterioration has been experienced in the downstream water supply system such as in 1981.

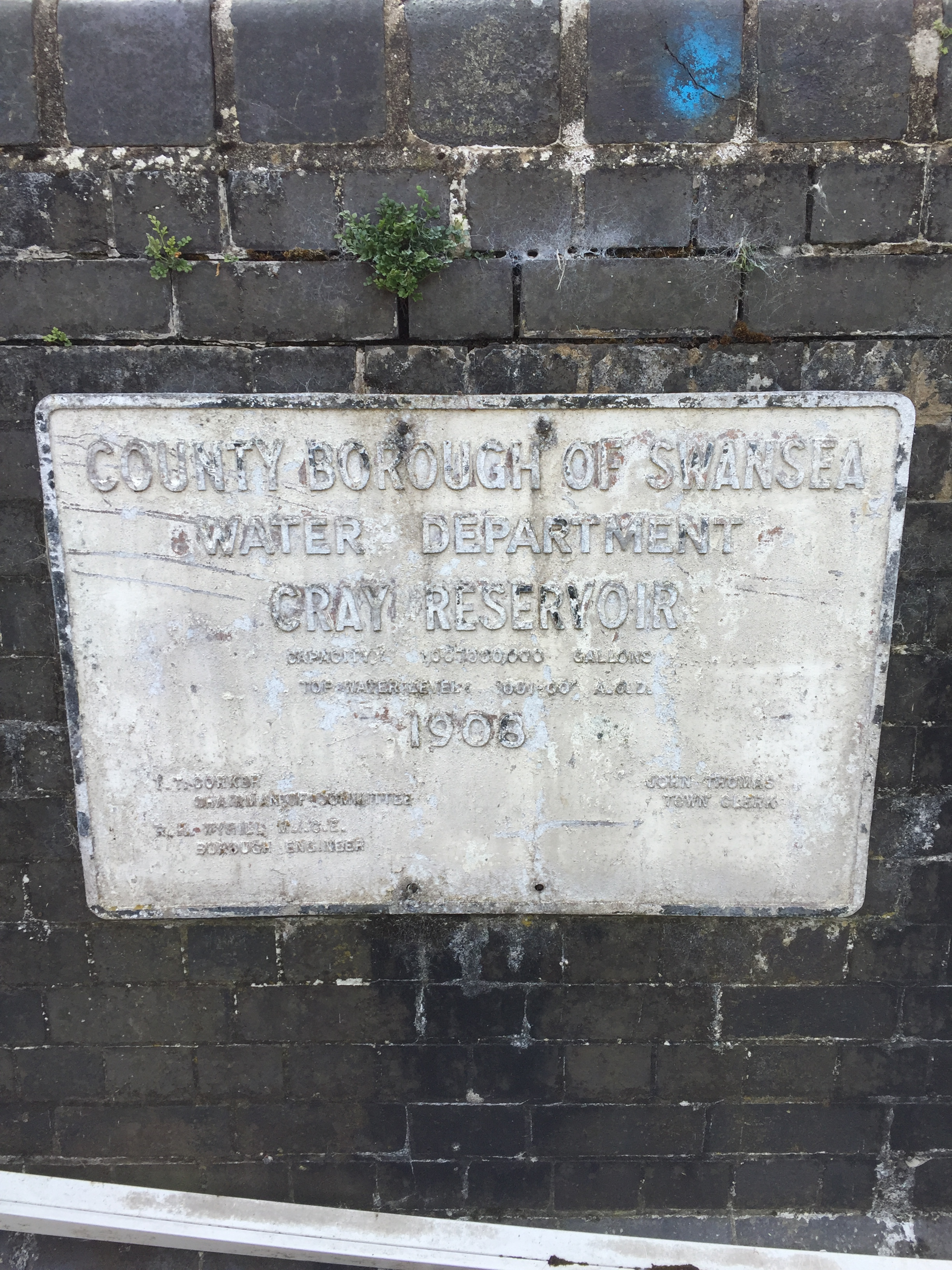
Plaque

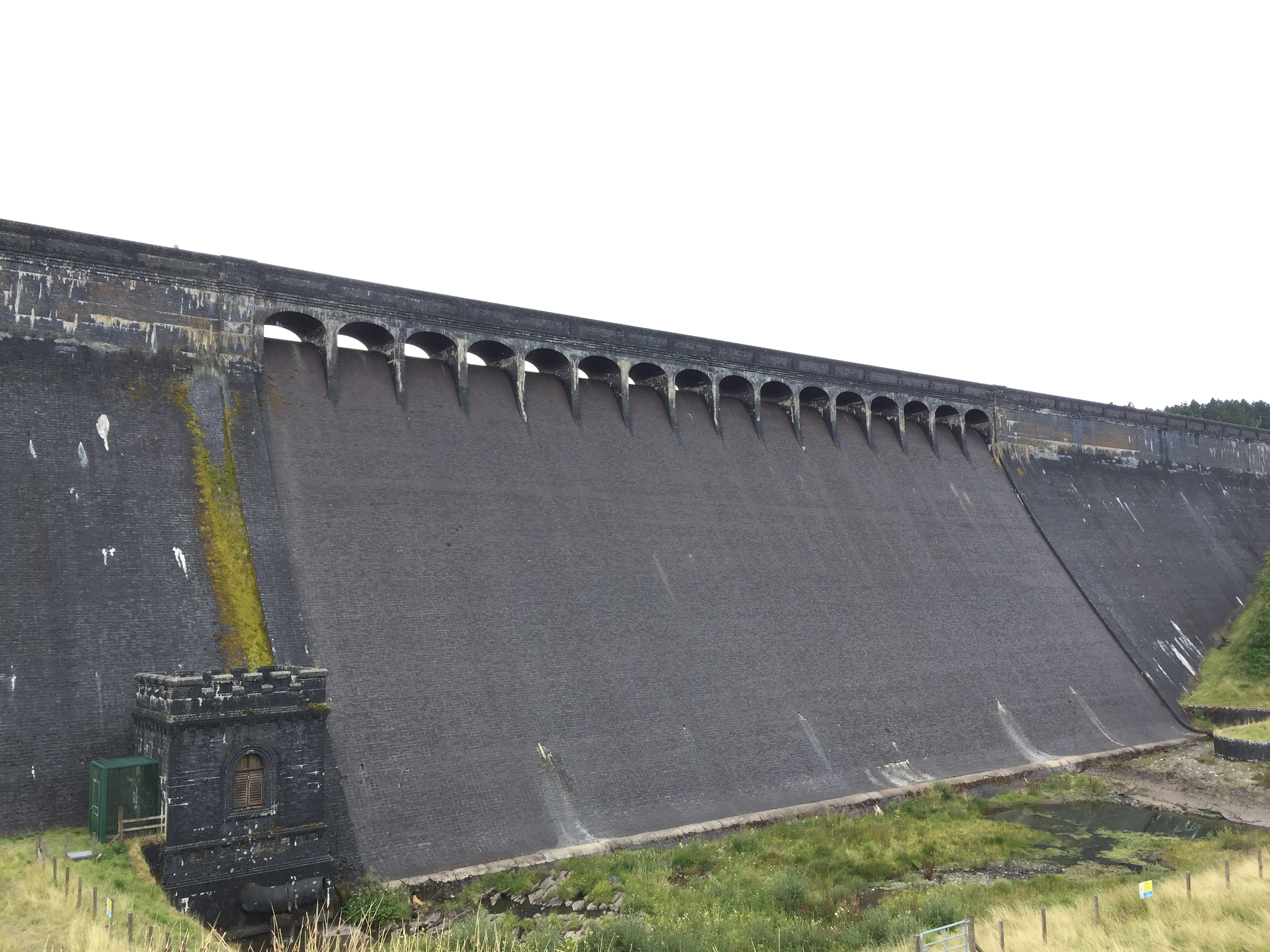
Face of the dam
