= Heol Senni =

Village in Powys, Wales

Coordinates: 51.8988°N 3.5602°W

Heol Senni is a hamlet in the valley of the Afon Senni just north of the Fforest Fawr section of the Brecon Beacons National Park. It lies within the community of Maescar in the county of Powys, Wales. The Welsh name means the 'road by (the river) Senni' and reflects its position near the crossing of the river by the minor road running from the A4067 to the A4215 road. This route was, and to some extent still is, an important link between Brecon and the upper Swansea Valley (or Tawe valley).

A proposal was made to dam the Afon Senni in the 1970s though local opposition to the scheme saw the plans dropped.
