= Ystradfellte =

Village in Powys, Wales

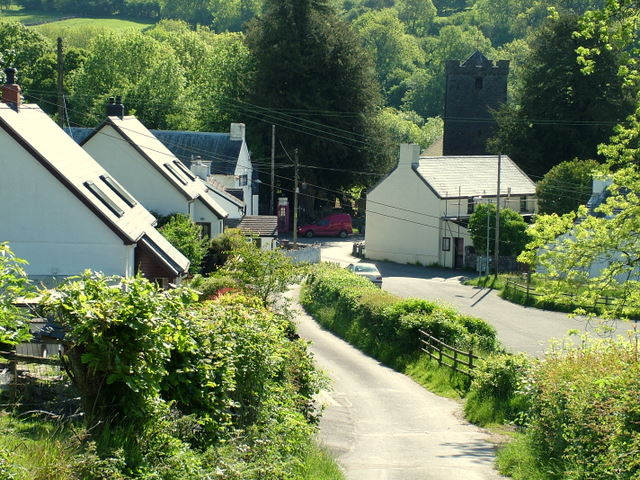
- Ystradfellte in 2005

- Location within Powys
- Population: 556 (2011)
- OS grid reference: SN929134
- Principal area: Powys
- Preserved county: Powys
- Country: Wales
- Sovereign state: United Kingdom
- Post town: ABERDARE
- Postcode district: CF44
- Post town: NEATH
- Postcode district: SA11
- Police: Dyfed-Powys
- Fire: Mid and West Wales
- Ambulance: Welsh
- UK Parliament: Brecon, Radnor and Cwm Tawe
- Senedd Cymru – Welsh Parliament: Brecon & Radnorshire
- List of places UK Wales Powys 51.80894°N 3.55487°W Community map: Map of the community

Ystradfellte (Welsh pronunciation: [ˌəstradˈvɛɬtɛ]) is a village and community in Powys, Wales, about 6 miles (10 km) north of Hirwaun, with 556 inhabitants. It belongs to the historic county of Brecknockshire (Breconshire) and the Fforest Fawr area of the Brecon Beacons National Park, beside the Afon Mellte river. The village is linked by minor roads with Heol Senni to the north and the A4059 north of Penderyn, and with Pontneddfechan, which lies in the community, at the head of the Vale of Neath to the south. It comes under Aberdare for postal purposes.

== History ==
Ystradfellte is chiefly known in history as the place where the Welsh nobleman and rebel leader Llywelyn Bren surrendered at the end of his revolt of 1316. Llywelyn gave himself up on the condition that his men be spared, but was himself put to death in 1318 at Cardiff.

The village was connected to mains electricity in 1960, as one of the last communities in the whole of England and Wales to be wired. Outlying properties in the Nedd Fechan valley had to wait until December 2005 for their connection.

== Features ==
The village is a popular tourist centre for its hillwalking, waterfalls and caves along the nearby rivers.

The surrounding area is renowned for its caves and karst scenery, making caving a popular activity. Some of the more famous caves near the village include:

- Porth yr Ogof, with the biggest cave entrance in Wales, into which the River Mellte flows.
- Little Neath River Cave.

The area is seen as part of Waterfall Country. A popular attraction near the village is the Waterfalls Walk, an easier walk along the Afon Mellte past two main falls on the river, Sgwd Clun-gwyn and Sgwd Isaf Clun-gwyn, to Sgwd yr Eira on the Afon Hepste, where the footpath passes behind the waterfall.

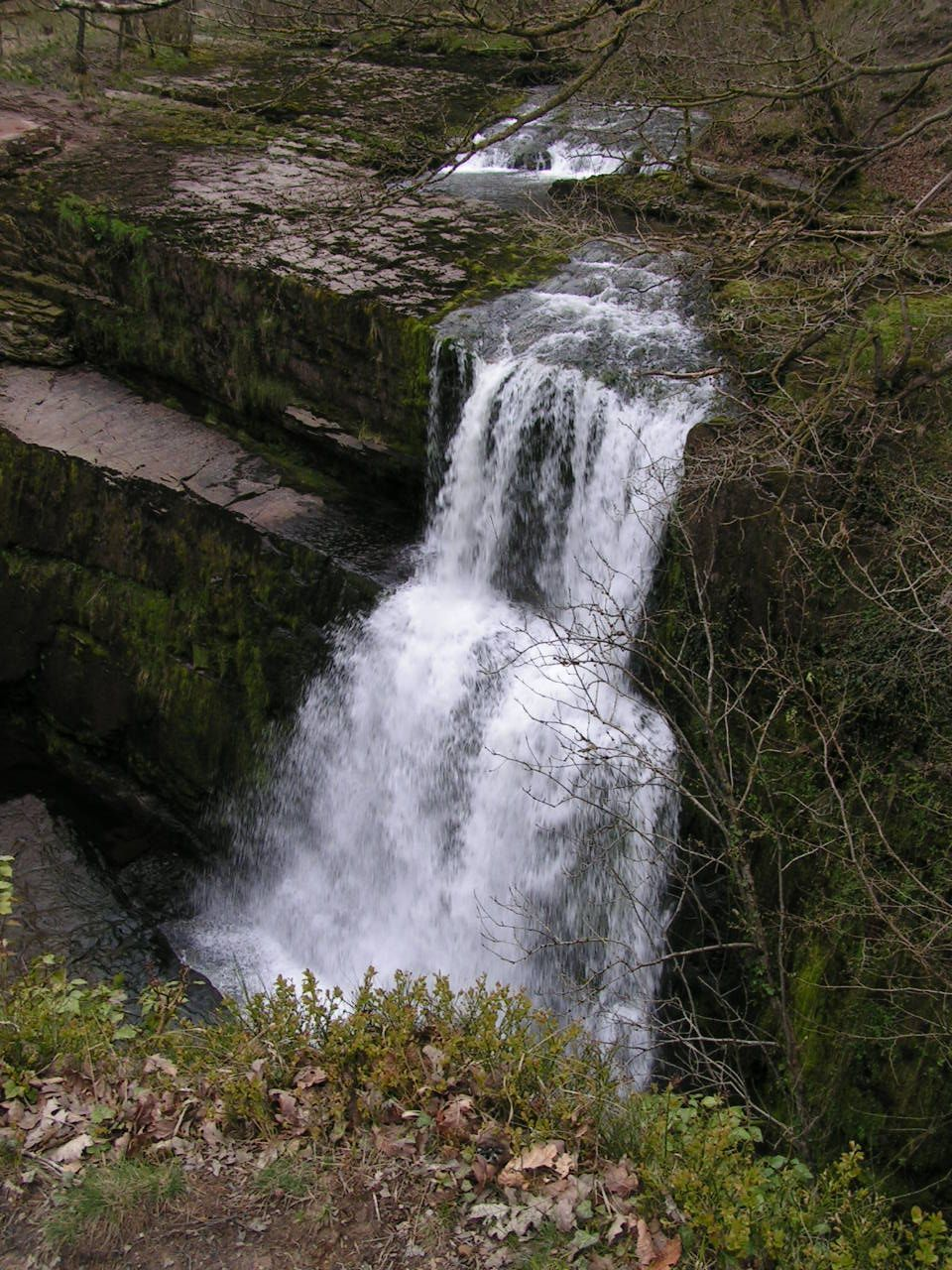
Sgwd Clun-gwyn, Afon Mellte

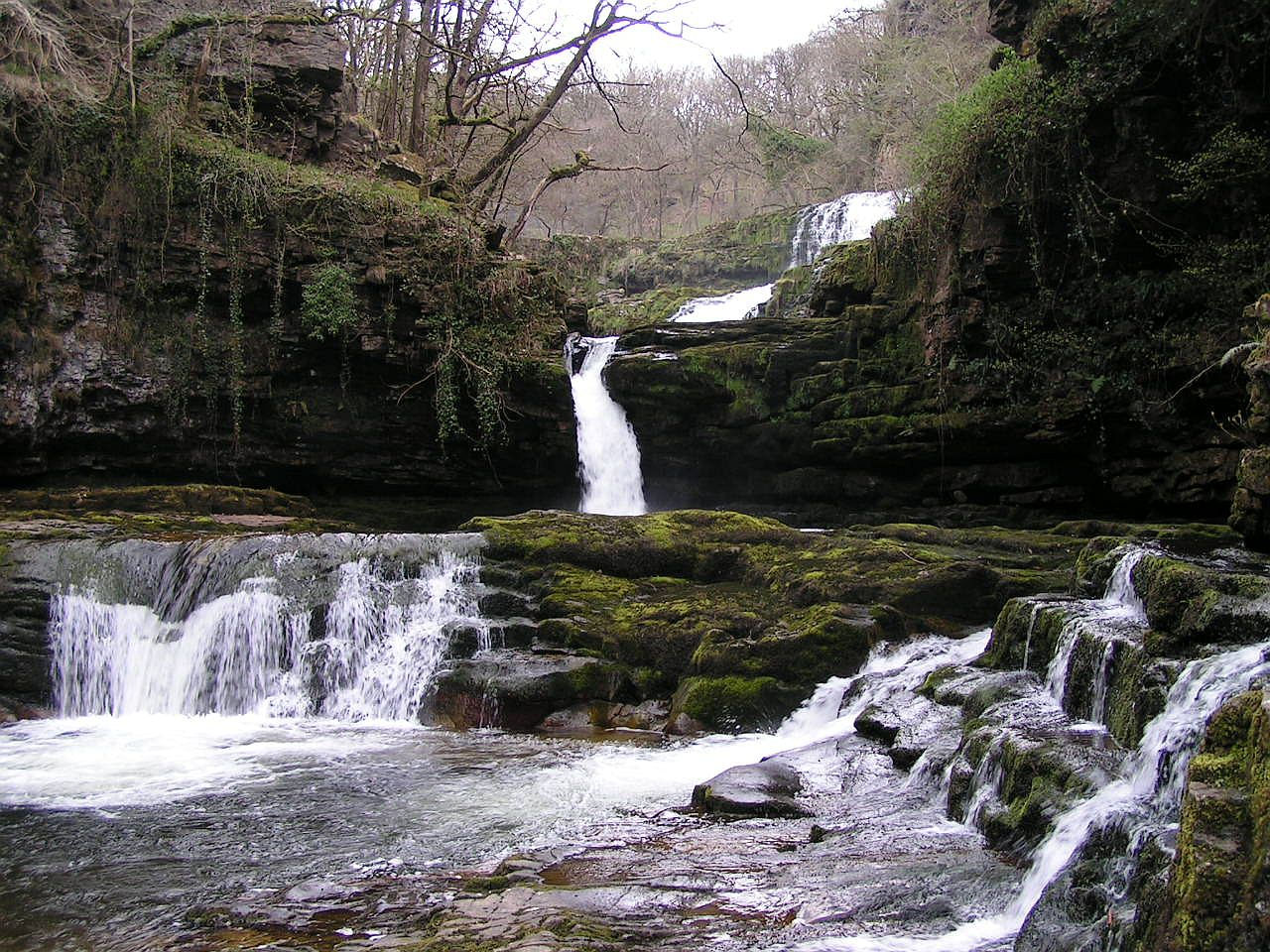
Sgwd Isaf Clun-gwyn, Afon Mellte

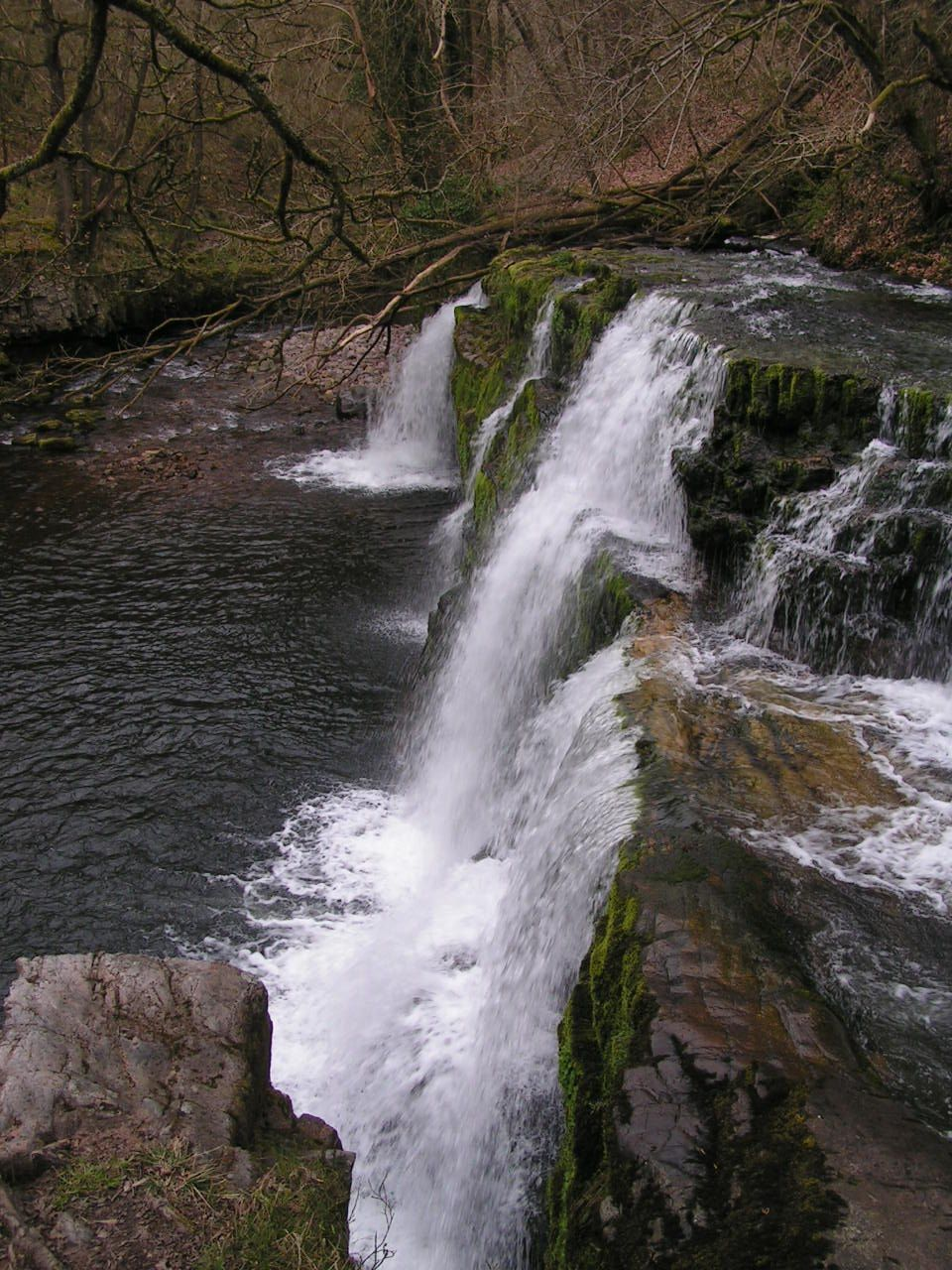
Sgwd y Pannwr, Afon Mellte

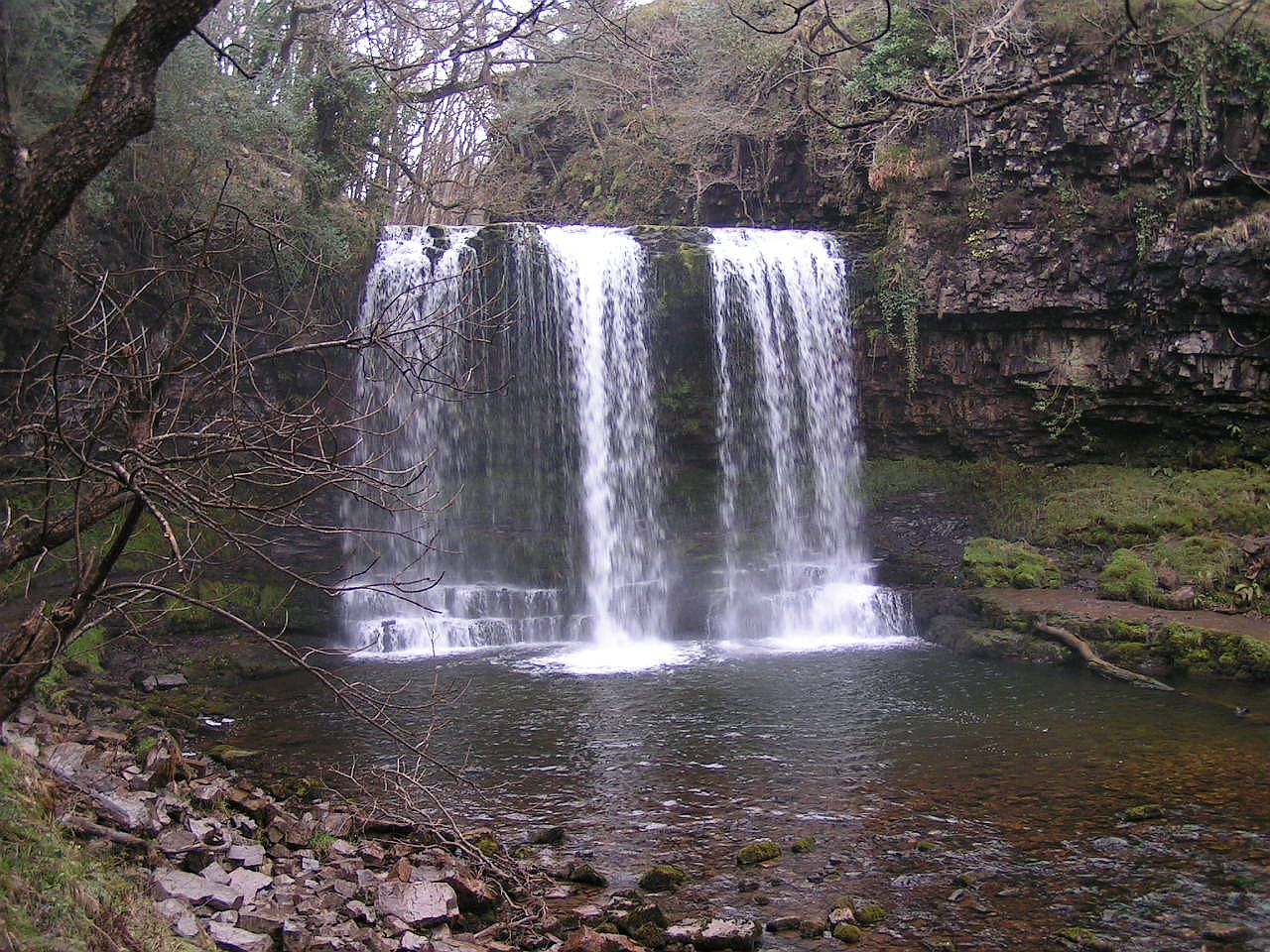
Sgwd yr Eira, Afon Hepste

The local public house, the New Inn, closed in 2024.

== Notable people ==
- David Williams (Welsh judge) (d. 1613), MP for Brecon, was born at Blaen Newydd, Ystradfellte, in about 1536.
- Evan Bevan (1803–1866), the Welsh-language poet, moved to Ystradfellte as a young adult.
- Barbara Brooke, Baroness Brooke of Ystradfellte (1908–2000), a Conservative Party politician.
