= Thomas Lewis =

Thomas Lewis may refer to:

== Sportsmen ==
- Thomas Lewis (English cricketer) (died 1882), English cricketer
- Thomas Lewis (Australian cricketer) (1829–1901), Australian cricketer
- Thomas Lewis (American football) (born 1972), American football wide receiver

== Politicians ==
- Thomas Lewis (of Harpton) (1518/9–1607), British member of parliament for Radnorshire, 1559–1567 and 1584–1587
- Thomas Lewis (Wells politician), 16th-century MP for Wells, Somerset
- Thomas Lewis (died 1594), MP for Monmouth Boroughs
- Thomas Lewis (died 1736) (c. 1679–1736), British member of parliament for Buckingham, Portsmouth, Salisbury and Winchester
- Thomas Lewis (Welsh politician) (1821–1897), Liberal member of parliament for Anglesey
- Thomas Lewis Jr. (1760–1847), U.S. congressman from Virginia
- Thomas Lewis (1690–1777), British member of parliament for Radnor, 1715–1761
- Thomas Arthur Lewis (1881–1923), Welsh school teacher, barrister and Liberal Party politician
- Thomas Lewis (Kentucky politician) (1749–1809), State Senator, prominent figure in the development of Kentucky
- Thomas Lewis (1821–1897) (1821–1897), Welsh-born Australian politician
- Thomas Lewis (Bristol politician) (1871–?), British trade unionist and politician
- Thomas Henry Lewis, member of the Ontario Provincial Parliament

== Others ==
- Thomas Lewis (activist) (1940–2007), artist and activist
- Thomas Lewis (footballer), Welsh international footballer in 1881
- Thomas Lewis (unionist) (1866–1939), president of the United Mine Workers of America
- Thomas Lewis (Virginia politician) (1718–1790), American surveyor, Virginia pioneer
- Thomas Lewis (cardiologist) (1881–1945), British surgeon and cardiologist
- Thomas Lewis (industrialist) (died 1764), co-founder of the Dowlais Ironworks in 1759
- Thomas Frankland Lewis (1780–1855), British Poor Law commissioner
- Thomas Christopher Lewis (1833–1915), British organ-builder, see St Paul's Cathedral, Melbourne
- Thomas Flo Lewis, inventor of the Bassa alphabet
- Thomas Lewis (RAF officer) (1894–1961), World War I flying ace
- Thomas Lewis (controversialist) (1689–?), English cleric
- Thomas Lewis (organist) (died 1674), English organist
- Thomas J. Lewis (1857–1920), United States Army cavalry officer
- Thomas Taylor Lewis (1801–1858), English geologist and antiquarian

== See also ==
- Tom Lewis (disambiguation)
- Tommy Lewis (disambiguation)
- Thomas Louis (1758–1807), British Royal Naval officer
- Lewis Thomas (1913–1993), American physician and author
