= East Hamlet =

Former civil parish in Shropshire, England

Coordinates: 52.373°N 2.713°W

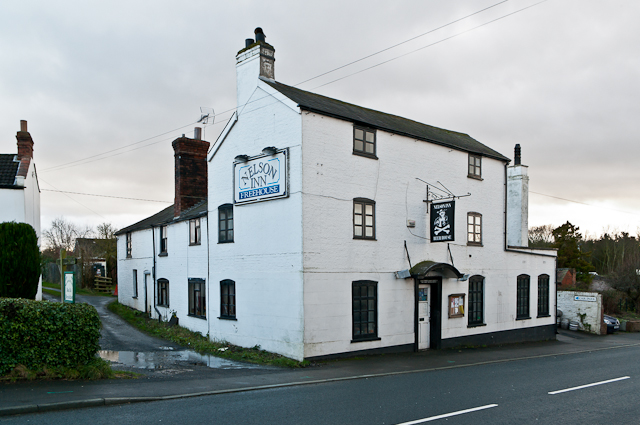
- The Nelson Inn

- Location within Shropshire
- Unitary authority: Shropshire
- Ceremonial county: Shropshire
- Region: West Midlands
- Country: England
- Sovereign state: United Kingdom
- Police: West Mercia
- Fire: Shropshire
- Ambulance: West Midlands

East Hamlet was a civil parish situated immediately to the east and northeast of the market town of Ludlow, Shropshire. The name, which dates much further back than the creation of the civil parish, refers to a small settlement in the eastern area of Ludlow. In 1971 the parish had a population of 66.

== History ==
The civil parish was formed on 25 March 1884 when the southern part of Stanton Lacy parish that bordered Ludlow was transferred to Bromfield, Bitterley and a third part to the new civil parish of East Hamlet.

Due to the eastwards growth of Ludlow's urban area, East Hamlet had parts ceded to Ludlow's civil parish in 1901 and again in 1934. On 1 April 1987 the remainder (a small rump of what was originally a small parish) was largely transferred to Ludford civil parish (the part to the east of the A49 by-pass) and small parts to both Ludlow (the part within the by-pass), Bromfield (Wigley and Fishmore) and Bitterley. This abolished East Hamlet, with Ludford named as its successor parish.

== Present-day ==
The post office on Gravel Hill in Ludlow is still formally East Hamlet Post Office. The neighbouring Ludlow Hospital is still sometimes known as the East Hamlet hospital, the former workhouse for "lunatics, idiots, imbeciles and vagrants". Otherwise, the name is rarely used or seen in the present day, and none of the current wards or electoral divisions in the area use the name (it was last used as a South Shropshire district ward circa 2000). Two residential roads — Hamlet Road and Hamlet Close — commemorate the East Hamlet name, at least in part.
