= Tommy Lewis =

Tommy Lewis may refer to:

- Tommy Lewis (trade unionist) (1873–1962), British trade unionist and politician
- Tommy Lewis (American football) (1931–2014), U. Alabama player whose notoriety comes from the 1954 Cotton Bowl Game
- Tommy Lewis (footballer), Welsh footballer
- Tom E. Lewis (1958–2018), Australian actor and musician, sometimes credited as Tommy

== See also ==
- Tom Lewis (disambiguation)
- Thomas Lewis (disambiguation)
