= Albert Wardell =

Welsh footballer

Personal information
- Date of birth: 12 January 1908
- Place of birth: Bilston, England
- Date of death: 1987 (aged 78–79)
- Position: Outside right

Youth career
- 1923–1927: Newport Amateurs

Senior career*
Years	Team	Apps	(Gls)
1927–1930	Newport County	41	(9)
1929–1930	Chelsea (loan)	0	(0)
1930	Wolverhampton Wanderers (loan)	0	(0)
1930	Darlington	5	(2)
1930	Newport County	2	(0)
1931–1933	Hereford United		
1933–1934	Shrewsbury Town		
1934–19??	Taylor Brothers F.C.		

International career
1929	Wales XI		
- * Club domestic league appearances and goals

Albert Wardell (12 January 1908 – 1987) was a Welsh professional footballer who played primarily for Newport County and represented the Wales national football team.

== Career ==
Wardell was the son of John Wardell and was either born in Newport, Monmouthshire or Bilston, South Staffordshire.

In 1929, Wardell, 21, was selected for the Football Association of Wales tour of Canada but these matches were not classed as international cap matches. His Newport County teammate Bob Pugh was also selected for the tour.

He signed with Darlington F.C. in 1930.
