= Fishmore Hall Hotel =

Historical House

Coordinates: 52°22′59.0″N 2°42′53.7″W

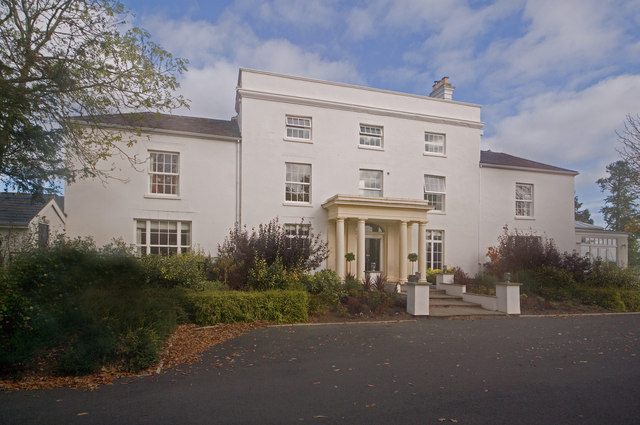
Fishmore Hall, Ludlow, Shropshire

The Fishmore Hall Hotel in Ludlow, Shropshire is a house of historical significance. A major part of it was built in about 1820 but some of the building may be older than this. It was a private residence for many years and in the late part of the 20th century it became a school. It was recently converted to a hotel.

== John Hooper Holder ==
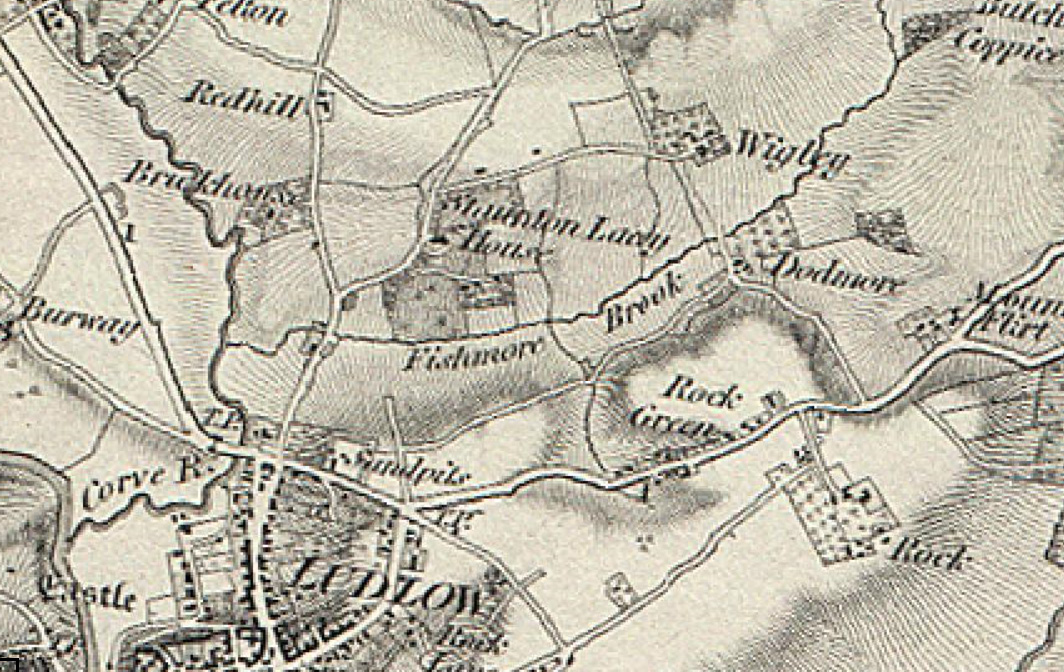
Map of Ludlow in 1832 showing that Fishmore Hall was called Staunton Lacy House at this time.

John Hooper Holder was the major builder of Fishmore Hall. In the early years it was called Stanton (or Staunton) Lacy House as the map on the right shows. He made substantial alterations and additions in about 1820.

John Hooper Holder was born in 1779 in Dorking Surrey. He was the son of William Thorpe Holder and Philippa Eliot Hooper. His father died in 1787 when he was only eight years old and the family moved to Bath where he lived with his mother and siblings. He knew Jane Austen and is mentioned in her letters. His uncle was James Holder who lived at Ashe Park near Jane Austen’s home Steventon rectory and was a close friend of her parents. When John was 21 he went to a Ball at Hurstbourne Park. Jane Austen had also been invited and when writing to her sister Cassandra, Jane mentions that he had been one of her dance partners.

In 1808 Holder married Elizabeth Hewett, who died two years later. He then married Anne Ekins in 1812 who Jane Austen mentions several times in her letters. They lived at Cerney House in Gloucestershire for some time and then in about 1820 came to live at Fishmore Hall. They lived there until about 1840 and then went to Devon. A sale notice was placed in the newspapers in 1840 which is shown below.

== Later residents ==
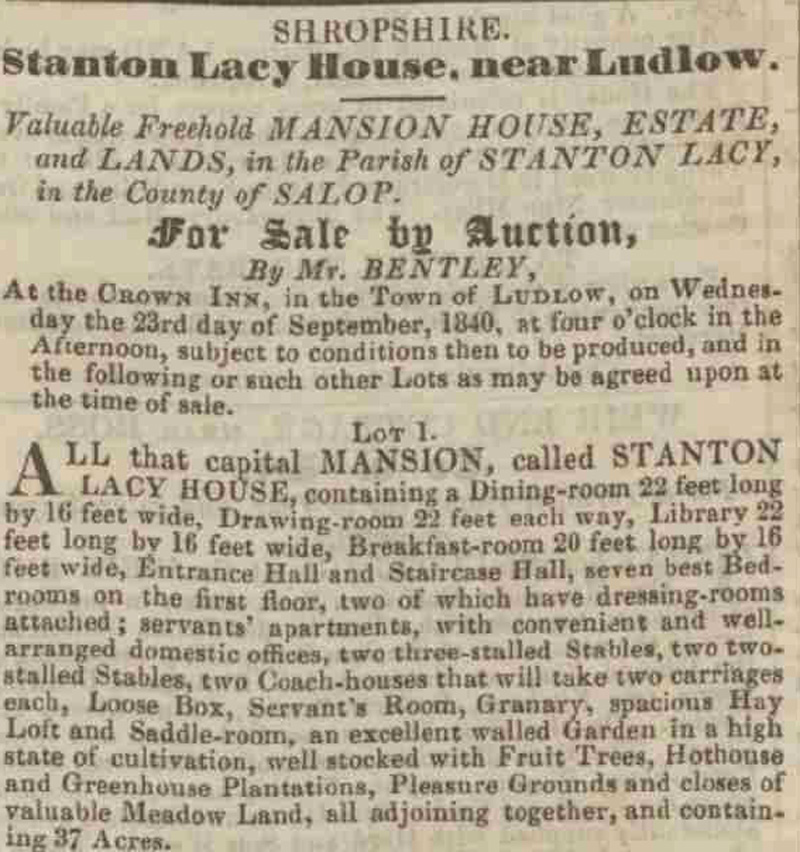
Sale advertisement for Fishmore Hall in 1840 (Fishmore Hall was called Stanton Lacy House at that time.

Robert Spence (1787–1873) and his wife Charlotte were residents of the house between about 1845 and 1855. After this Lady Alicia Trimlestown lived there with her son Evan Herbert Lloyd until her death in 1860.

The Reverend Arthur Pardoe (1821–1879) moved into Fishmore Hall in about 1863 and remained there for the next decade. Arthur Pardoe was the son of Rev George Dansey Pardoe who owned Nash Court in Shropshire. He was educated at Cambridge University and became a clergyman. In 1873 he moved to another property that he owned to retire and he sold Fishmore Hall to Sir Charles Henry Rouse Boughton.

Sir Charles Henry Rouse Boughton owned Downton Hall, Herefordshire, which is only a short distance from Fishmore Hall for many years. He bought the property for the use of his family and he also rented it out occasionally. His son William St Andrew Rouse Boughton (1853–1937) lived there for some time before he inherited Downton Hall when his father died in 1906. Henry Thomas Weyman was a tenant from 1907 until about 1925.

In about 1950 the Hall became a school and served this function until about 2000. It then became derelict for some years. In 2007 it was restored and converted into a hotel.
