= Hollie Robertson =

British dancer

- Born: Hollie Victoria Robertson; 21 March 1985 (age 40)
- Occupation: dancer
- Known for: winning Strictly Dance Fever

Hollie Victoria Robertson (born 21 March 1985) is an English dancer who won the second series of the BBC One dance talent show Strictly Dance Fever together with partner Darrien Wright. In the final they beat Darren Bailey and Lana Williams.

== Early life ==
Robertson grew up in Ludlow, Shropshire. Her background is gymnastics in which she participated from the age of six to thirteen until she slipped a disc. She achieved third place at the British Championships in the vaulting horse, later getting into hip hop dance. Robertson names Levell Smith Junior as her biggest influence.

== Education ==
Robertson took dance classes at In-Steps in Ludlow, where she still teaches hip hop and commercial jazz. From 2005, she attended the Midlands Academy of Dance and Drama in Nottingham for a two-year course in musical theatre.

== Career before Strictly Dance Fever ==
In 2004, Robertson won choreographer Wade Robson's MTV show, Shakedown, taking the title of best dancer in Europe. In 2005, she was a backing dancer in the video of the single "Only U" by Ashanti. She has also danced for Rachel Stevens and McFly.

== Strictly Dance Fever ==
Strictly Dance Fever is an amateur dance competition broadcast on the BBC, consisting of several rounds of auditions followed by weekly live shows in which one couple is voted off each week until three couples are left for the final live show. Voting is done by professional judges and the viewing public, each making up 50% of the total score. The four judges award scores out of ten, while the public phones in to vote for their favourite. During the weeks of the live shows, the couples live together in a Dance Mansion where they receive intensive training.

The show is open to non-professional dancers over the age of 18. Even though Robertson had previously won a similar competition on MTV called Shakedown and had been awarded the title of best dancer in Europe, she was not a professional dancer, and therefore, was allowed to enter.

Robertson participated in series two, which was broadcast in the spring of 2006. In that series 80,000 participants applied for the auditions. Over a million telephone votes were cast over the course of the series.

Robertson auditioned with her boyfriend Bruno. Eventually he was not selected for the live shows and she was partnered with Darrien Wright. Robertson and Wright won the final on 3 June 2006 beating Darren Bailey and Lana Williams.

Robertson and Wright received the top score of ten out of ten of all the judges on both their dances in the final. They performed The Milonga and a freestyle dance. In an earlier round they had also achieved the highest possible score for one of their dances.

The prize consisted of £50,000 for the couple and a contract to dance for one week in the production of Footloose on the West End. Robertson said after winning the final: "I want to put the prize money towards a dance studio so I can teach."

=== Dances and scores ===
Dances performed by Robertson and Wright on the second series of Strictly Dance Fever
	Dance	Judges scores				
	Dance	Stacey Haynes	Arlene Phillips	Wayne Sleep	Ben Richards	Total
Show 1	Rock and Roll	8	8	8	9	33
Show 2	Argentine tango	6	4	7	5	22
Show 3	Guapacha	8	9	8	7	32
Show 4	Jitterbug	6	7	7	7	27
Show 5	American Smooth	8	10	8	9	35
Show 6	Milonga	10	10	10	10	40
Show 6	Lindy Hop	8	7	8	8	31
Show 7	Hustle	n/a	6	9	8	23 (out of 30)
Show 7	Adagio	n/a	6	6	8	20 (out of 30)
Final	Milonga	10	10	10	10	40
Final	Freestyle	10	10	10	10	40

== Career after Strictly Dance Fever ==
As part of their prize, Robertson and Wright won a professional dance contract. This culminated early in July 2006 when, for a week, the pair took to the West End stage as background dancers in Footloose in London's Novello Theatre. David Essex and Cheryl Baker also starred in the show.

On 11 August 2006, Robertson's career suffered a minor set-back when she was injured after an attack on holiday in Portugal. Robertson was left with severe bruises and her nose had to be reset. Regarding this incident, she was quoted as saying: "I've never had anything so painful happen to me in my life before. It was horrible, absolutely horrible. [...] Stuff happens to you in life and you just have to get on with it and as long as I don't stop dancing it's ok...I'll be ok."

In 2007, Robertson appeared in the UK tour of Fame alongside dance partner Darrien Wright.
