= Tom Lewis =

Tom Lewis may refer to:

== Arts and entertainment ==
- Tom Lewis (actor) (born 1998), British actor
- Tom Lewis (author) (born 1958), Australian author and military historian
- Tom Lewis (songwriter) (born 1943), British folksinger/songwriter
- Tom E. Lewis (1958–2018), Australian actor and musician

== Politics ==
- Tom Lewis (American politician) (1924–2003), U.S. Representative from Florida, 1993–1995
- Tom Lewis (Australian politician) (1922–2016), New South Wales politician

== Sport ==
- Tom Lewis (cricketer) (born 1991), English cricketer
- Tom Lewis (golfer) (born 1991), English golfer
- Tom Lewis (rugby union) (1902–1994), Welsh rugby international

== Other people ==
- Tom Lewis (chef), Scottish chef
- Tom Lewis (physician) (1918–2004), British obstetrician

== See also ==
- Thomas Lewis (disambiguation)
- Tommy Lewis (disambiguation)
