= Shropshire Community Health NHS Trust =

- Type: Community health trust
- Chair: Nuala O'Kane
- Chief executive: David Stout
- Website: www.shropscommunityhealth.nhs.uk

Shropshire Community Health NHS Trust provides community health services (not including adult mental health) in Shropshire (including Telford and Wrekin). It was established in July 2011 from the community health provider arms of Shropshire County PCT and Telford and Wrekin PCT. It runs services at Community Hospitals in Ludlow, Bridgnorth, Bishop's Castle and Whitchurch.

Following its last CQC inspection in 2019 the trust was rated 'good'.
