= Ludlow Hospital =

- Shropshire Community Health NHS Trust
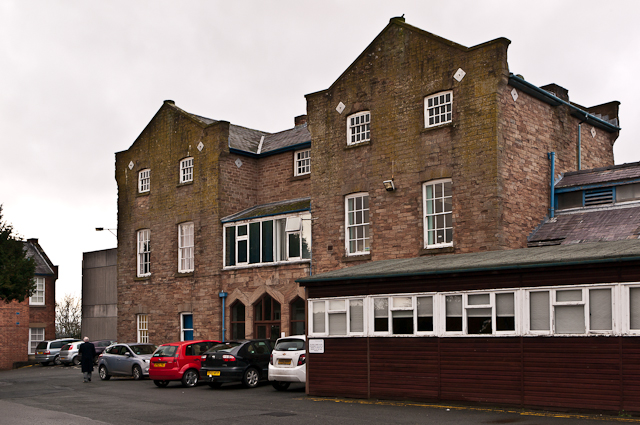
- Ludlow Hospital

- Shropshire

Geography
- Location: Ludlow, Shropshire, England, United Kingdom
- Coordinates: 52.373°N 2.714°W

Organisation
- Care system: Public NHS
- Type: Community

Services
- Emergency department: Minor injuries unit
- Beds: 24

History
- Founded: 1948

Links
- Website: www.shropscommunityhealth.nhs.uk
- Lists: Hospitals in England

Ludlow Hospital is an NHS community hospital located on Gravel Hill in Ludlow, Shropshire, England. It is managed by the Shropshire Community Health NHS Trust.

== History ==
The facility has its origins in the Ludlow Poor Law Workhouse which was established in 1833. The facility was converted into a hospital and joined the National Health Service as Ludlow Hamlet Hospital in 1948. It became Ludlow Hospital in 1982.

After plans for a new hospital for Ludlow were dropped in 2013, the existing hospital was renovated in 2014. Local campaigners have been fearful that the hospital – and particularly inpatient provision – was under threat. It was reported in 2015 that bed numbers had been reduced from 40 to 24. As of August 2025, the hospital remained open but some patients were being asked to travel to alternative hospitals for routine appointments.
