= Bob Pugh =

Welsh footballer

Personal information
- Place of birth: Wales
- Height: 5 ft 11 1/2 in (1.82 m)

Senior career*
Years	Team	Apps	(Gls)
1926–1931	Newport County		
1931–1938	Nottingham Forest		
- * Club domestic league appearances and goals

Bob Pugh was a Welsh professional footballer who played for Newport County and Nottingham Forest

In 1929 Pugh was selected for the Football Association of Wales tour of Canada but these matches were not classed as international cap matches. His Newport County teammate Albert 'Nippy' Wardell was also selected for the tour. Pugh and Tommy Lewis of New Brighton were the only two players in the squad not to attain full international caps either before or after the tour. He was transferred to Nottingham Forest in January 1931.
