= Tommy Lewis (footballer) =

Welsh footballer

Thomas Henry Lewis (born 1903; date of death unknown) was a Welsh professional footballer who played as a wing-half for New Brighton.

== Career ==
Lewis was born in Greenfield, Flintshire. He made 110 Football League appearances for New Brighton from 1927 to 1932, scoring four goals. In 1929 Lewis was selected for the Football Association of Wales tour of Canada but these matches were not classed as international cap matches. Lewis and Bob Pugh of Newport County were the only two players in the squad not to attain full international caps either before or after the tour.
