= Thomas Lewis (English cricketer) =

English cricketer

Personal information
- Full name: Thomas Courtney Lewis
- Born: Unknown; Holborn, London, England
- Died: 1 June 1882; Sandown, Isle of Wight, England
- Batting: Unknown
- Bowling: Unknown

Career statistics
Competition	First-class
Matches	2
Runs scored	4
Batting average	1.33
100s/50s	–/–
Top score	4
Balls bowled	?
Wickets	4
Bowling average	?
5 wickets in innings	–
10 wickets in match	–
Best bowling	4/?
Catches/stumpings	–/–
- Source: Cricinfo, 30 June 2013

Thomas Courtney Lewis (date of birth unknown – 1 June 1882) was an English cricketer. Lewis' batting and bowling styles are unknown. He was christened at Holborn, London on 2 March 1816.

Lewis made his first-class debut for the Gentlemen in the Gentlemen v Players fixture of 1837 at Lord's, where he batted last in the Gentlemen's first-innings and was dismissed for a duck by Sam Redgate, while in their second-innings he was absent hurt. Lewis later made a second first-class appearance nearly a decade later in 1846 for the Surrey Club against the Marylebone Cricket Club at The Oval. Opening the batting with J. Spenceley in the Surrey Club's first-innings, he was dismissed for 4 runs, stumped by William Nicholson off the bowling of William Hillyer. He followed this up in the Marylebone Cricket Club's first-innings by taking four wickets, the most by any Surrey Club bowler in that innings. Batting at number eight in their second-innings, Lewis was dismissed for a duck by Hillyer.

He died at Sandown, Isle of Wight on 1 June 1882.
