= Ludlow =

Town and civil parish in Shropshire, England

Coordinates: 52.368°N 2.718°W

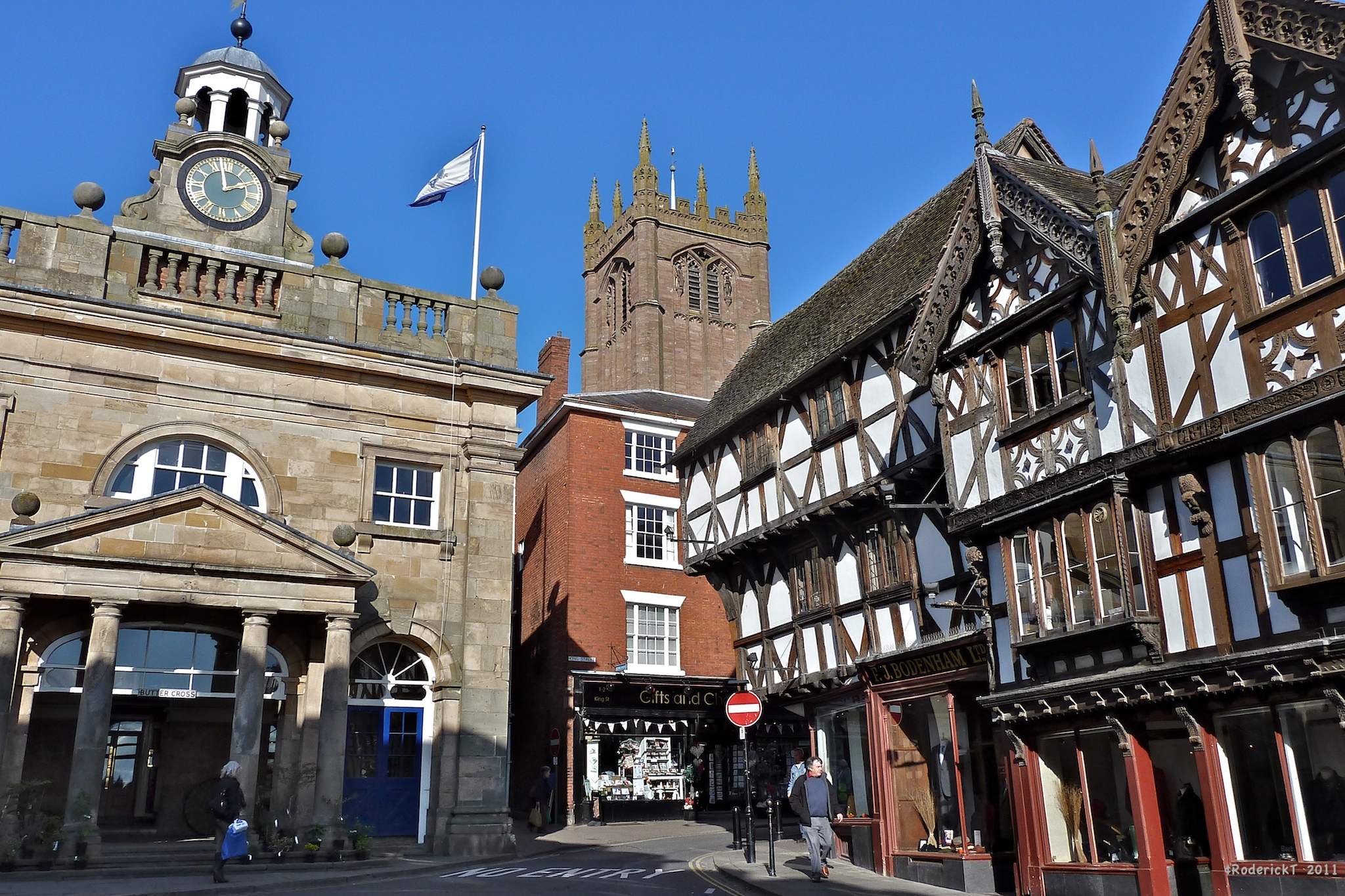
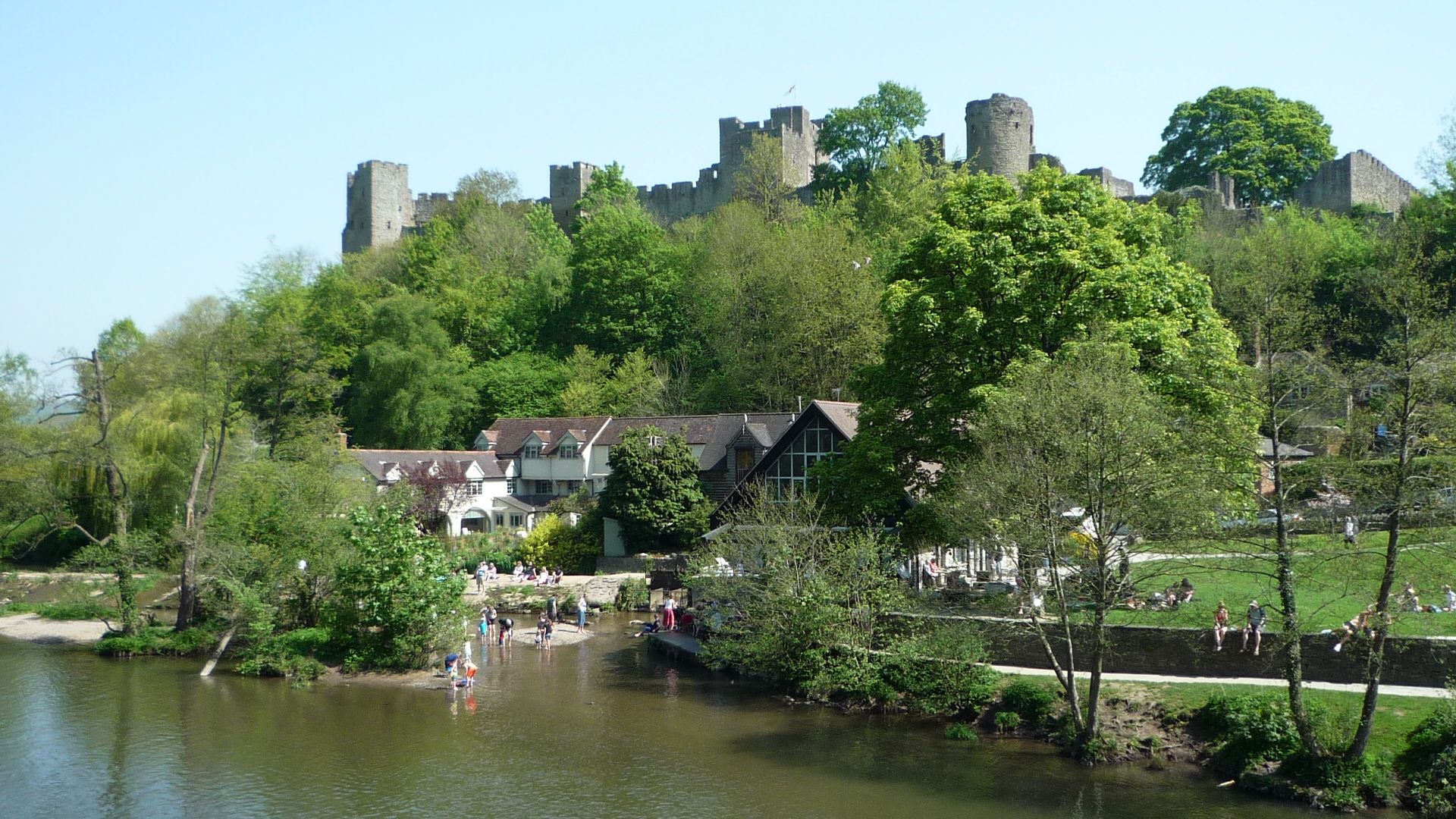
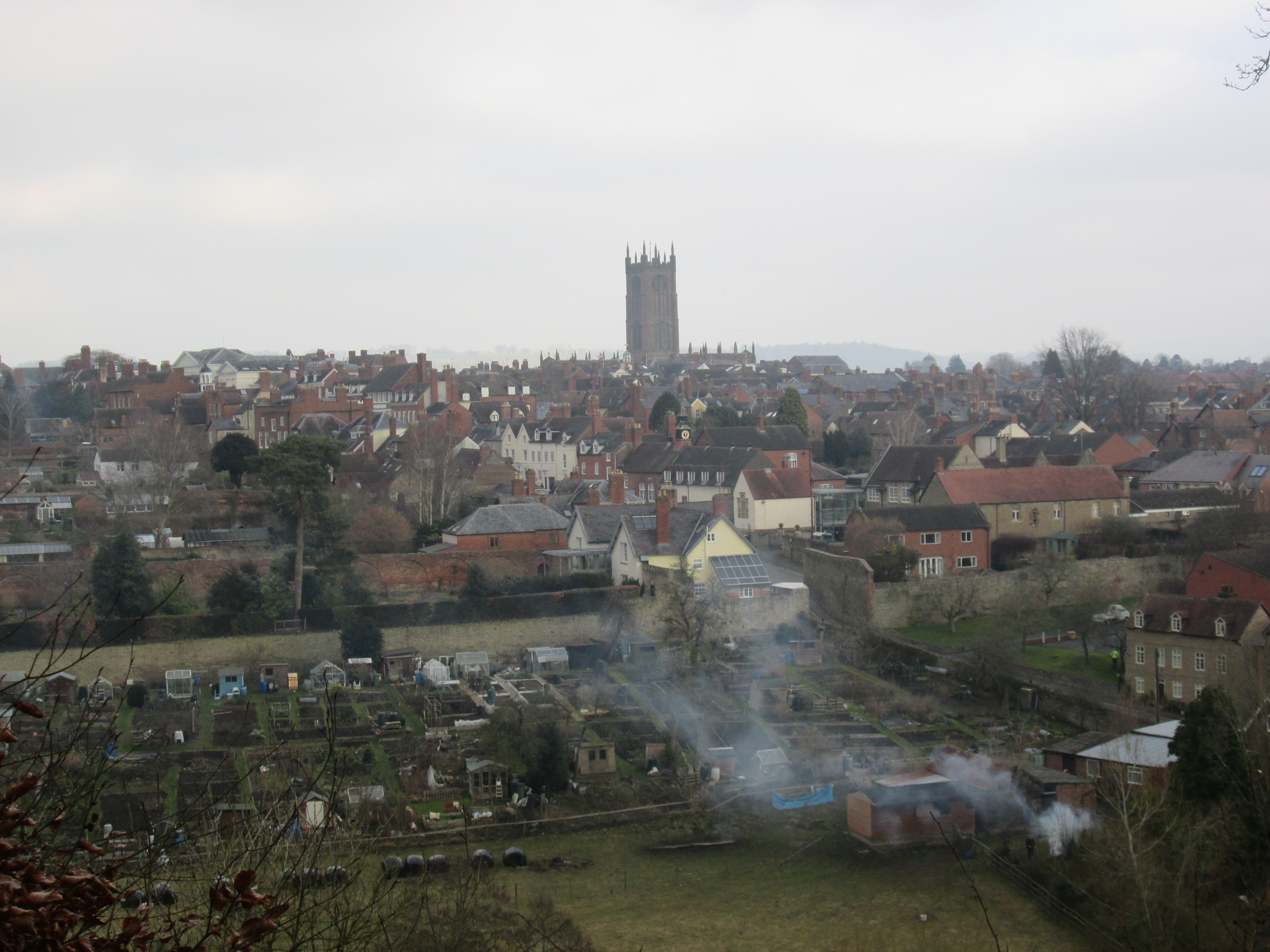
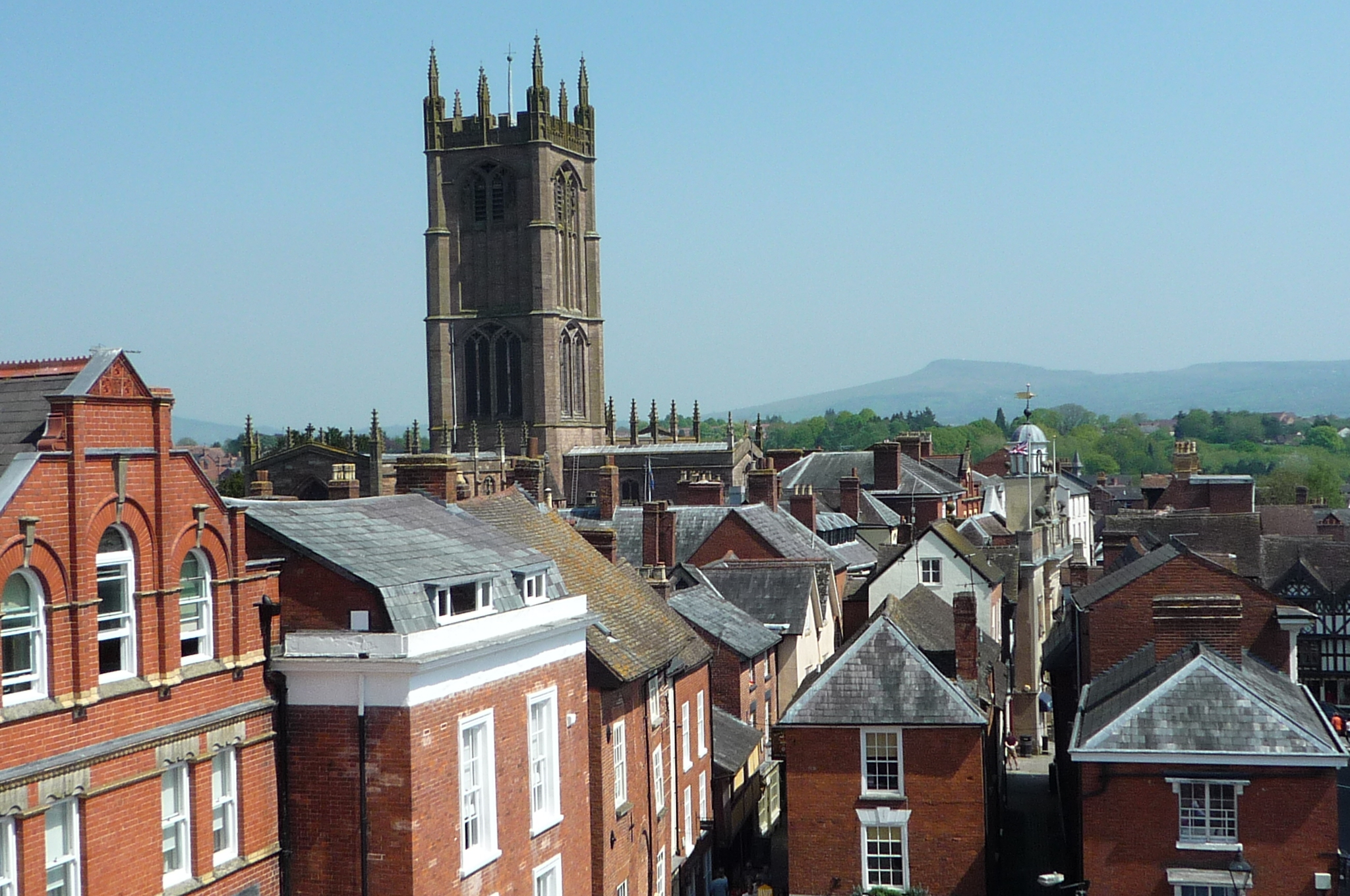
- Clockwise from top: Junction of Broad Street and King Street, with the Buttercross, Ludlow skyline, St Laurence's Church and Ludlow Castle.

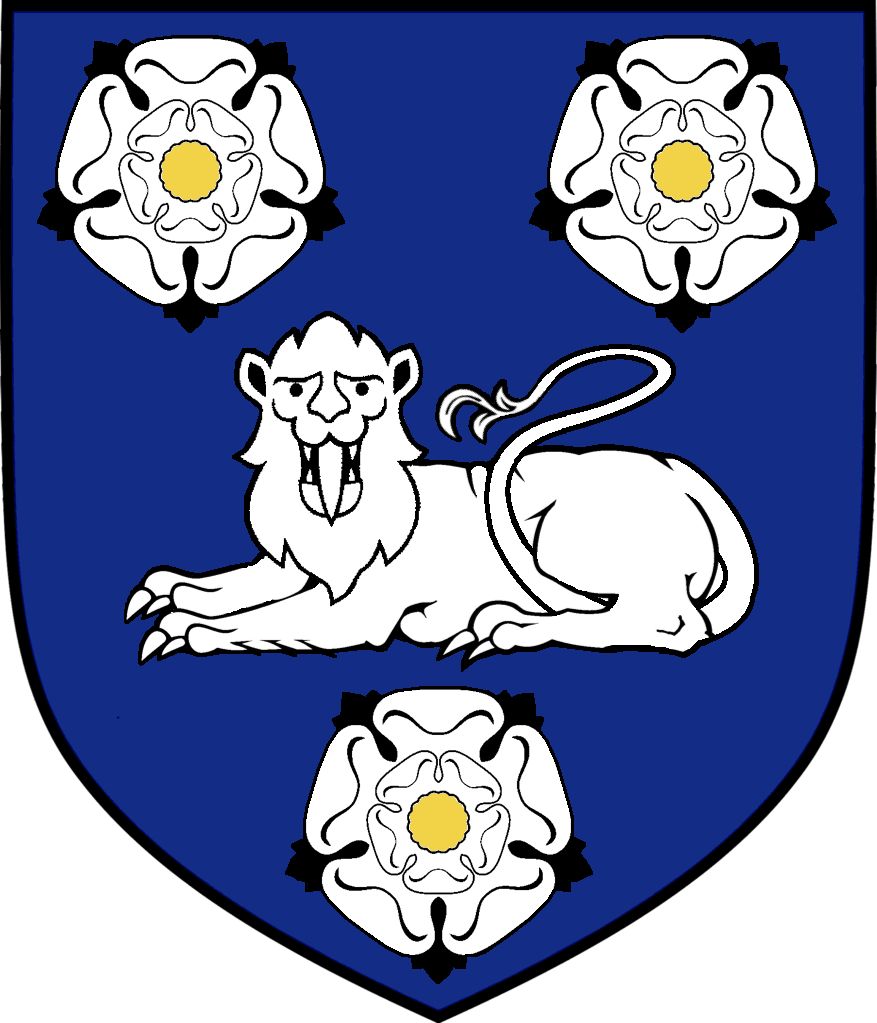
- Coat of arms of Ludlow

- Location within Shropshire
- Population: 10,039 (2021)
- OS grid reference: SO512746
  - London: 154 miles (248 km)
- Civil parish: Ludlow
- Unitary authority: Shropshire
- Ceremonial county: Shropshire
- Region: West Midlands
- Country: England
- Sovereign state: United Kingdom
- Post town: LUDLOW
- Postcode district: SY8
- Dialling code: 01584
- Police: West Mercia
- Fire: Shropshire
- Ambulance: West Midlands
- UK Parliament: South Shropshire
- Website: www.ludlow.org.uk

Ludlow (/ˈlʌdloʊ/ LUD-loh) is a market town and civil parish in south Shropshire, England. It is located 28 miles (45 km) south of Shrewsbury and 23 miles (37 km) north of Hereford, on the A49 road which bypasses the town. The town is near the confluence of the rivers Corve and Teme.

The oldest part is the medieval walled town, founded in the late 11th century after the Norman conquest of England. It is centred on a small hill which lies on the eastern bank of a bend of the River Teme. Situated on this hill are Ludlow Castle and the parish church, St Laurence's, the largest in the county. From there the streets slope downward to the rivers Corve and Teme, to the north and south respectively. The town is in a sheltered spot beneath Mortimer Forest and the Clee Hills, which are clearly visible from the town.

Ludlow has nearly 500 listed buildings, including examples of medieval and Tudor-style half-timbered buildings. The town was described by Sir John Betjeman as "probably the loveliest town in England".

== Toponymy ==
The 13th century romance Fouke le Fitz Waryn records that Ludlow had been called Dinam "for a very long time". It is also known that Ludlow Castle was originally named Dinham Castle when it was constructed in the 11th century, even today the area immediately south of the castle retains the original name. Samuel Lewis states that while Leadlowe and Ludlowe were the Saxon names for the town, the British name was Dinam, which he translates as 'the palace of princes'. Even in the 18th century, Daniel Defoe recorded that "the Welch call this town Llys Tywysog, which is in English, the Prince's Court."

Lodelowe was in use for this site before 1138 and comes from the Old English hlud-hlǣ. At the time this section of the River Teme contained rapids, and so the hlud of Ludlow came from 'the loud waters', while hlǣw meant 'hill' or tumulus. Thus the name Ludlow describes a 'place on a hill by the loud waters'. Some time around the 12th century, weirs were added along the river, taming these rapid flows. The hill is that which the town stands on, and a pre-historic burial mound (or barrow) which existed at the eastern summit of the hill (dug up during the expansion of St Laurence's church in 1199) could explain the tumulus variation of the hlǣw element. Ludford, a neighbouring and older settlement, situated on the southern bank of the Teme, shares the hlud ('loud waters') element.

== History ==
The town is situated close to Wales, and lies near the midpoint of the 257-kilometre-long (160 mi) England–Wales border; it is also very close to the county border between Shropshire and Herefordshire (neighbouring Ludford remained part of Herefordshire until 1895). This strategic location invested it with national importance in medieval times, and thereafter with the town being the seat of the Council of Wales and the Marches during its existence (1472 to 1689).

=== Medieval history ===
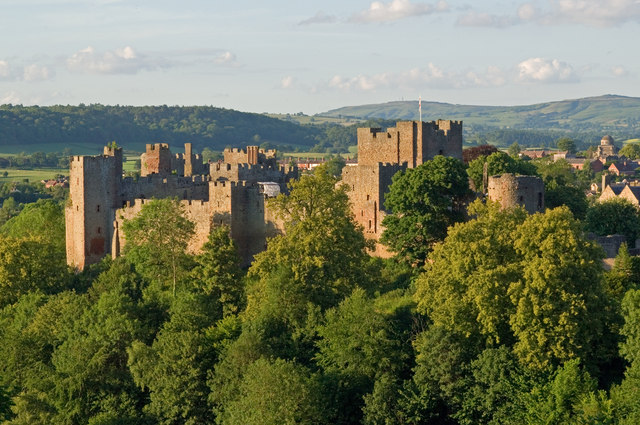
Ludlow Castle, built in the late 11th century.

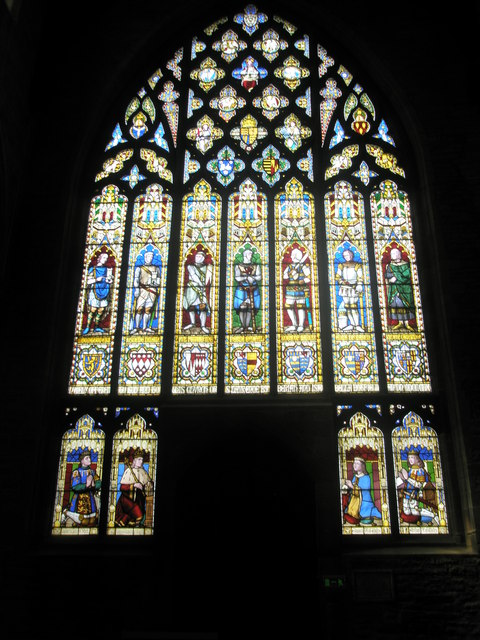
The stained glass window above the west door of St Laurence's displays the Lords of Ludlow Castle and most notably four key royals associated with Ludlow during/after the Wars of the Roses. The praying figures at the foot are (from left to right) Richard, Duke of York, his son Edward IV and his son Edward V and grandson Arthur, Prince of Wales.

At the time of the Domesday Book survey, the area was part of the large Stanton parish and manor, a possession of Walter de Lacy. Neither Ludlow nor Dinham are mentioned in the Book, compiled in 1086, although the Book recorded manors and not settlements per se. The Book does record a great number of households and taxable value for Stanton, perhaps suggesting that any early settlement by the nascent castle was being counted. Neighbouring places Ludford, the Sheet and Steventon do feature in the Book, as they were manors, proving that they were well-established places by the Norman conquest. The manor of Stanton came within the hundred of Culvestan, but during the reign of Henry I this Saxon hundred was merged into the new Munslow hundred.

Walter's son Roger de Lacy began the construction of Ludlow Castle on the western promontory of the hill about 1075, forming what is now the inner bailey. Between about 1090 and 1120, the Chapel of St. Mary Magdalene was built inside the walls, and by 1130 the Great Tower was added to form the gatehouse. About 1170 the larger outer bailey was added to the castle. (The town walls however were not built until the mid-13th century.) The settlement of Dinham grew up alongside the development of the early castle in the late 11th century, with the northern part of this early settlement disturbed by the building of the outer bailey. Dinham had its own place of worship, the Chapel of St Thomas the Martyr, dedicated to Thomas Becket sometime in 1177–1189 when the present chapel replaced an older (late 11th-century) church building.

During the 12th century, the planned town of Ludlow was formed, in stages, the town providing a useful source of income for successive Marcher Lords, based on rents, fines, and tolls. They developed the town on a regular grid pattern, although this was adapted somewhat to match the local topography, from the late 11th century through the 12th century. The first laid street was along the ridge of the hilltop, what is now Castle Square, High Street and King Street. This formed a wide marketplace (later in-filled by buildings in places) running from the castle gates east across to St Laurence's and the Bull Ring, itself located on the ancient north–south road, now called Corve Street to the north and Old Street to the south. The wide Mill and Broad Streets were added later, as part of a southern grid plan of streets and burgage plots filling the area bounded by Dinham, the new High Street market, Old Street and the Teme to the south. Originally, Old Street ran down to a ford which took the ancient route south across to Ludford. A bridge was constructed (possibly by Josce de Dinan) at the foot of Broad Street, upstream of the ford, which then replaced the ford; its 15th-century replacement is the present-day Ludford Bridge.

St Laurence's Church, whose origins are late 11th century, was rebuilt and enlarged (with a bell tower) in 1199-1200 and became a parish church, with the separation of Ludlow from the parish of Stanton Lacy by 1200. The town notably had two schools (a choir and a grammar) in existence c. 1200; Ludlow Grammar School remained in existence until 1977, when it became Ludlow College.

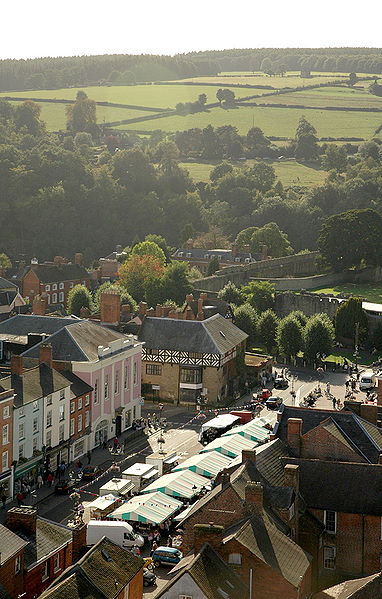
The town's outdoor market, in Castle Square, photographed from St Laurence's Church

Ludlow Castle was an important border fortification along the Welsh Marches, and one of the largest in the Norman/English ring of castles surrounding Wales. It played a significant role in local, regional and national conflicts such as the Owain Glyndŵr rebellion, the Wars of the Roses and the English Civil War. The castle and its adjoining town grew in political importance and in the 15th century the castle became the seat of the Council of Wales and the Marches. It was a temporary home to several holders of the title Prince of Wales, including King Edward V and Arthur Tudor, who died there in 1502.

The site features heavily in the folk-story of Fulk FitzWarin, outlawed Lord of Whittington, Shropshire and a possible inspiration for the Robin Hood legend. Fulk is brought up in the castle of Josce de Dinan, and fights for his master against Sir Gilbert de Lacy – these battles are the source of the story of Marion de la Bruyere, the betrayed lover whose ghost is still said to be heard screaming as she plummets from the castle's turrets.

The first recorded royal permission to maintain defensive town walls was given to the "men of Ludlow" in the Patent Rolls of 1233. The entry is however incomplete and atypical and was not renewed in the usual way. A murage grant was next made in 1260 and renewed regularly over the next two centuries. This time the grant was made by name to Geoffrey de Genevile, Lord of Ludlow. From this and other surviving documents it seems that the town walls and gates were in place by 1270. They were constructed about the central part of the community with four main gates and three postern gates. Because the walls were constructed after the development of the town's streets, the positions and names of the four main gates are based on the streets they crossed; the postern gates on the other hand are located by and named after old outlying districts. The 7 gates are (clockwise from the castle; postern gates in italics) Linney, Corve, Galdeford, Old, Broad, Mill and Dinham. An eighth unnamed 'portal' gate (smaller than a postern gate) existed in the wall just to the northwest of the castle, now in the gardens of Castle Walk House. The town walls are largely still in existence, although a section alongside the churchyard of St Lawrence's is, as of 2015, in need of repairs.

The castle complex continued to expand (a Great Hall, kitchen and living quarters were added) and it gained a reputation as a fortified palace. In 1306 it passed through marriage to the ambitious Roger Mortimer, 1st Earl of March. Queen Isabella and her son, the young Edward III, were entertained at the castle in 1329.

=== Marcher town ===
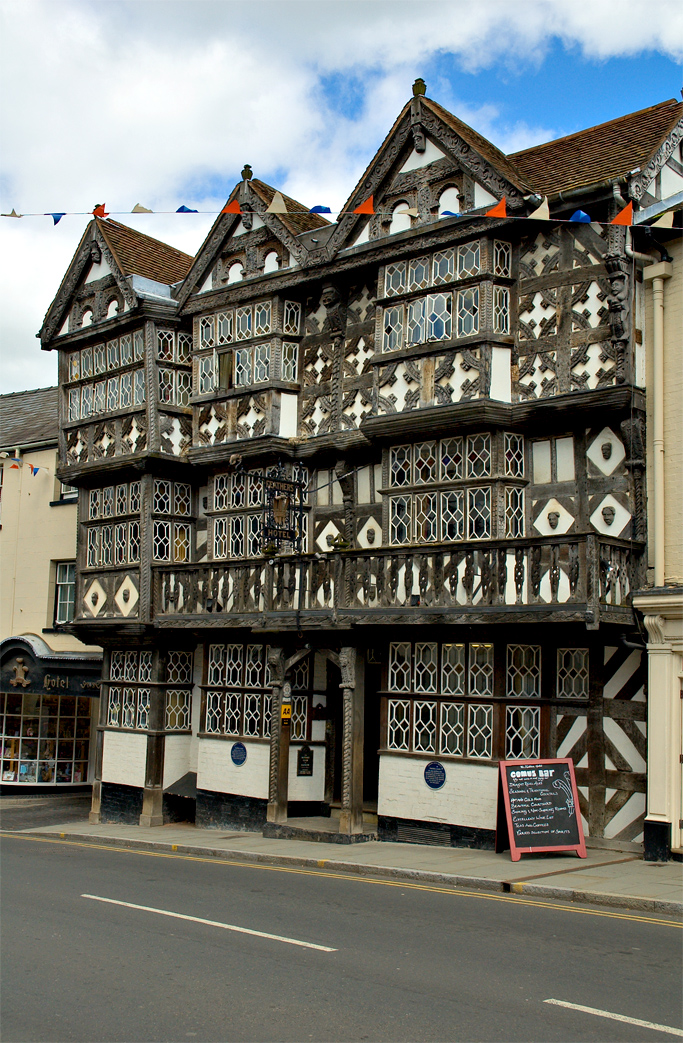
The Feathers Hotel, one of Ludlow's more famous timber-framed buildings.

The town prospered, with a population of about 1,725 by 1377, and sustained a population of about 2,000 for several centuries thereafter. It was a market town; market day was held on every Thursday throughout the 15th century. In particular, it served as a centre for the sale of wool and cloth. It was home to various trades, and in 1372 boasted 12 trade guilds including metalworkers, shoemakers, butchers, drapers, mercers, tailors, cooks, bakers and probably the most notable in the town, the religious Palmer's Guild.

In the mid sixteenth century the London merchant Sir Rowland Hill gave the money for a new bridge over the Teme, and the annual St. Catherine's fair.

There were merchants of moderate wealth in the town and especially wool merchants, such as Laurence of Ludlow, who lived at nearby Stokesay Castle. The collection and sale of wool and the manufacture of cloth continued to be the primary source of wealth until the 17th century.

This prosperity is expressed in stone masonry, wood carvings and stained-glass at St. Laurence's parish church; effectively a wool church, it is the largest in Shropshire and a member of the Greater Churches Group. Despite the presence of some Decorated work it is largely Perpendicular in style. Its size and grandeur has given it the nickname "the cathedral of the Marches", and from 1981 to 2020 there was a suffragan Bishop of Ludlow.

During the Wars of the Roses, the castle—which he held through his Mortimer inheritance—was one of Richard, Duke of York's main strongholds. The Lancastrian forces captured Ludlow in 1459, at the Rout of Ludford Bridge, but the Yorkists won control of England in 1461. The castle became property of the Crown, passing to Richard's son, Edward IV. The town rose in prominence under Edward's reign and was incorporated as a borough, and began sending representatives to Parliament. Edward set up the Council of Wales and the Marches in 1472, headquartering it at Ludlow, and sent his son Edward, Prince of Wales, to live there, as nominal (being only a young boy) head of the council. It was at Ludlow that the young prince heard the news of his father's death in 1483 and was himself proclaimed King Edward V of England. It was from Ludlow that Edward V was brought back to London with his young brother, both to be confined in the Tower of London when, after a short period of time, they were never seen again.

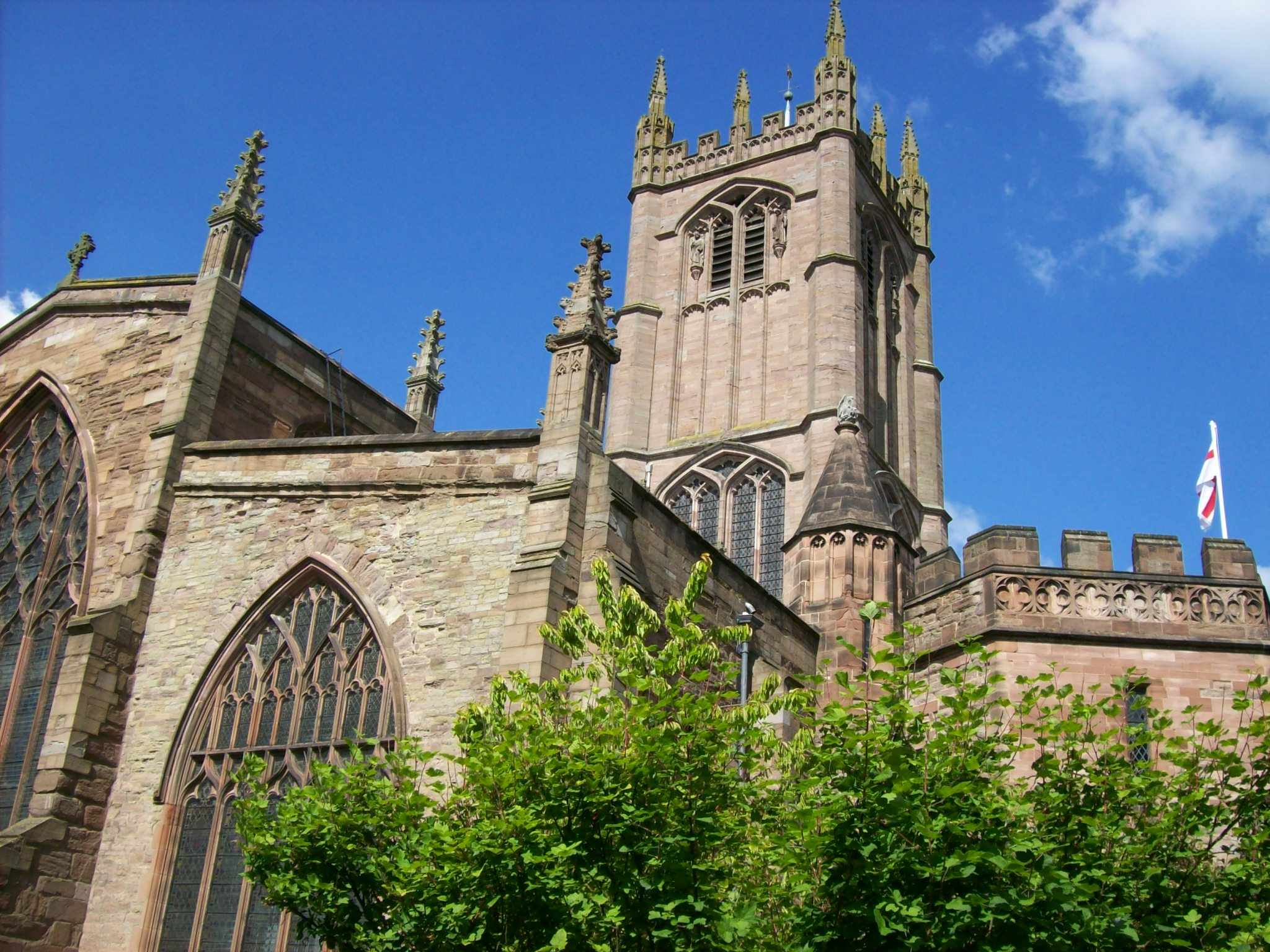
The Church of St Laurence has Norman origins and expanded throughout the Middle Ages, being a wool church, becoming the largest parish church in Shropshire.

Under Henry VII the castle continued as the headquarters of the Council of Wales and served as the administration centre for Wales and the counties along the border, known as the Welsh Marches. During this period, when the town served as the effective capital of Wales, it was home to many messengers of the king, various clerks and lawyers for settling legal disputes. The town also provided a winter home for local gentry, during which time they attended the council court sessions. Henry VII sent his heir Prince Arthur to Ludlow, where he was joined briefly by his wife Catherine of Aragon later to become wife to Henry VIII. Ludlow Castle was therefore the site of perhaps the most controversial honeymoon in English history, when Catherine's claim that the marriage was never consummated became central to the dispute concerning Henry VIII and Catherine's annulment in 1531.

Eventually, the council resumed and except for brief interludes, Ludlow continued to host the council until 1689, when it was abolished by William III and Mary II as part of the Glorious Revolution. The castle then fell into decay. The structure was poorly maintained and the stone was pillaged. In 1772 demolition was mooted, but it was instead decided to lease the buildings. Later still it was purchased by the Earl of Powis, and together, he and his wife directed the transformation of the castle grounds.

The Royal Welch Fusiliers were formed by Henry Herbert, 4th Baron Herbert of Chirbury at Ludlow in March 1689 to oppose James II and to take part in the imminent war with France. The regiment continued to have ties with the town of Ludlow, and its successor battalion in The Royal Welsh regiment was granted the freedom of the town in 2014.

=== 18th and 19th centuries ===
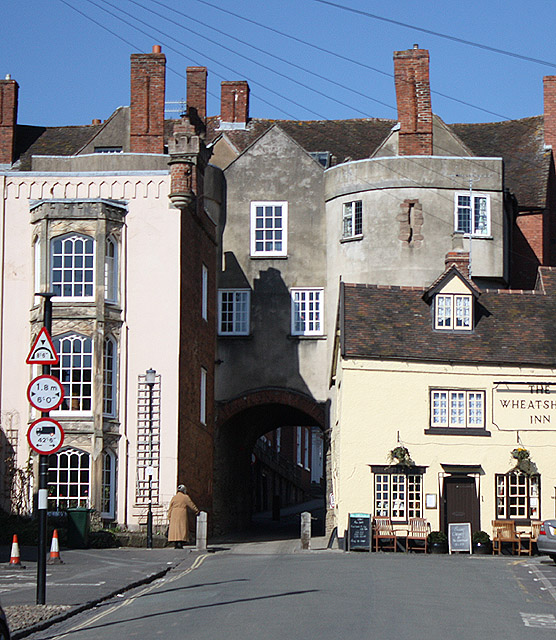
Ludlow had seven gates in its town walls; the only one remaining is the Broad Gate (viewed from the south).

The town contained several coaching inns, public houses and ale houses, leading to court records of some alcohol-induced violence and a certain reputation for excess. Several coaching inns were constructed to accommodate travellers by stagecoach and mail coach. The Angel on Broad Street was one such notable coaching inn, where several passenger and mail coaches departed and arrived on a regular basis every week, including the Aurora coach which departed for London (taking 27 hours in 1822). The Angel was the last coaching inn in Ludlow to have such coach traffic, following the arrival of the railways in 1852. The Angel ceased trading in the early 1990s, though was revived in 2018 as a wine bar occupying a front part of the original establishment. A surviving medieval coaching inn today is the 15th century Bull Hotel on the Bull Ring. Several other pubs and hotels in the town have historic pedigree, including the Rose and Crown where allegedly a pub has existed since 1102.

Glove manufacture was a major industry of the town, peaking in production in 1814.

In 1802, Horatio Nelson was awarded the freedom of the borough and stayed at The Angel coaching inn on Broad Street, together with his mistress Emma and her husband Sir William Hamilton. The honour was presented to him in a room at the inn, later to be known as the Nelson Room, and he addressed the crowds from one of the bay windows on the first floor. During the Napoleonic Wars, Lucien Bonaparte, younger brother of the French Emperor, and his family were imprisoned at Dinham House in 1811.

In 1832 Thomas Lloyd, the Ludlow doctor and amateur geologist, met Roderick Murchison at Ludford Corner to study the rocks exposed along the River Teme and on Whitcliffe, advancing Murchison's theory for a Silurian System that he was to publish in 1839. Immediately above the topmost layer of the marine rock sequence forming Murchison's Silurian System was a thin layer of dark sand containing numerous remains of early fish, especially their scales, along with plant debris, spores and microscopic mites. In contrast to the underlying sediments of the Ludlow Series which were deposited in a shallow warm sea some 400 million years ago, the Ludlow Bone Bed represents terrestrial (land) conditions and thus a fundamental change in the landscape. At the time, this was believed to be the earliest occurrence of life on land. Murchison thus took the Ludlow Bone Bed as the base of his Devonian System, although over a century later this boundary was to be moved a little higher, the overlying rocks being ascribed to the Pridoli. The science of geology has taken a number of local names from these studies and now applies them worldwide, in recognition of the importance of this area to scientific understanding, for example, Ludlow Series. The site is now an SSSI (Site of Special Scientific Interest) and still attracts international studies. The geological interval of time, the Ludlow Epoch, is named after the town as part of the Silurian Period.

=== Recent history ===
A greengrocers' shop amidst Ludlow's narrow streets.

By the late 20th century, the town had seen a growth in tourism, leading to the appearance of many antique dealers, as well as art dealers and independent bookshops (the latter now mostly gone). Bodenhams, a clothing retailer, has been trading from a 600-year-old timbered building since 1860 and is one of the oldest stores in Britain. Ludlow was described by Country Life as "the most vibrant small town in England."

A long battle of words between local activists (including many of the town's independent businesses) and Tesco was eventually solved when the mega retailer obtained planning permission to build a supermarket on Corve Street, on the northern edge of the town centre, but only after agreeing to conform to the architectural demands of the local council. The building is designed to follow the outline of the hills in the background, with a curving roof. An Aldi supermarket was subsequently constructed on a site over the road from Tesco.

A development of 91 houses by South Shropshire Housing Association at Rocks Green won a Sustainable Housing award in 2009, and a Sainsbury's supermarket at Rocks Green was opened in 2021.

In 1983 a small computer magazine started publication in Ludlow by Roger Kean, Oliver Frey and Franco Frey by Newsfield Publications Ltd called Crash. The magazine catered for the various owners of the ZX Spectrum, and its sister magazine Zzap!64 catered for Commodore's rival machine the C64. The magazine was extremely popular and became Britain's biggest-selling computer magazine in 1986 selling over 100,000 copies monthly. In 1991 Newsfield suffered financial difficulty and the magazines were sold and relaunched by Europress.

In 2004 funding was granted by Advantage West Midlands to build a new 'Eco-Park' on the outskirts of the town on the east side of the A49 bypass, at the Sheet Road roundabout, with space for traditional handcraft businesses, new environmentally friendly office buildings and a park & ride facility. More construction work began in 2006 on the west side of the roundabout on a much-debated pasture land on the town's fringe known as the Foldgate. The land has now been turned over to commercial use with a filling station, Travelodge hotel and chain pub/restaurant, opened in late 2008.

Ludlow Distillery was established in 2009, originally to produce brandy, and now also whisky and gin.

== Geography ==
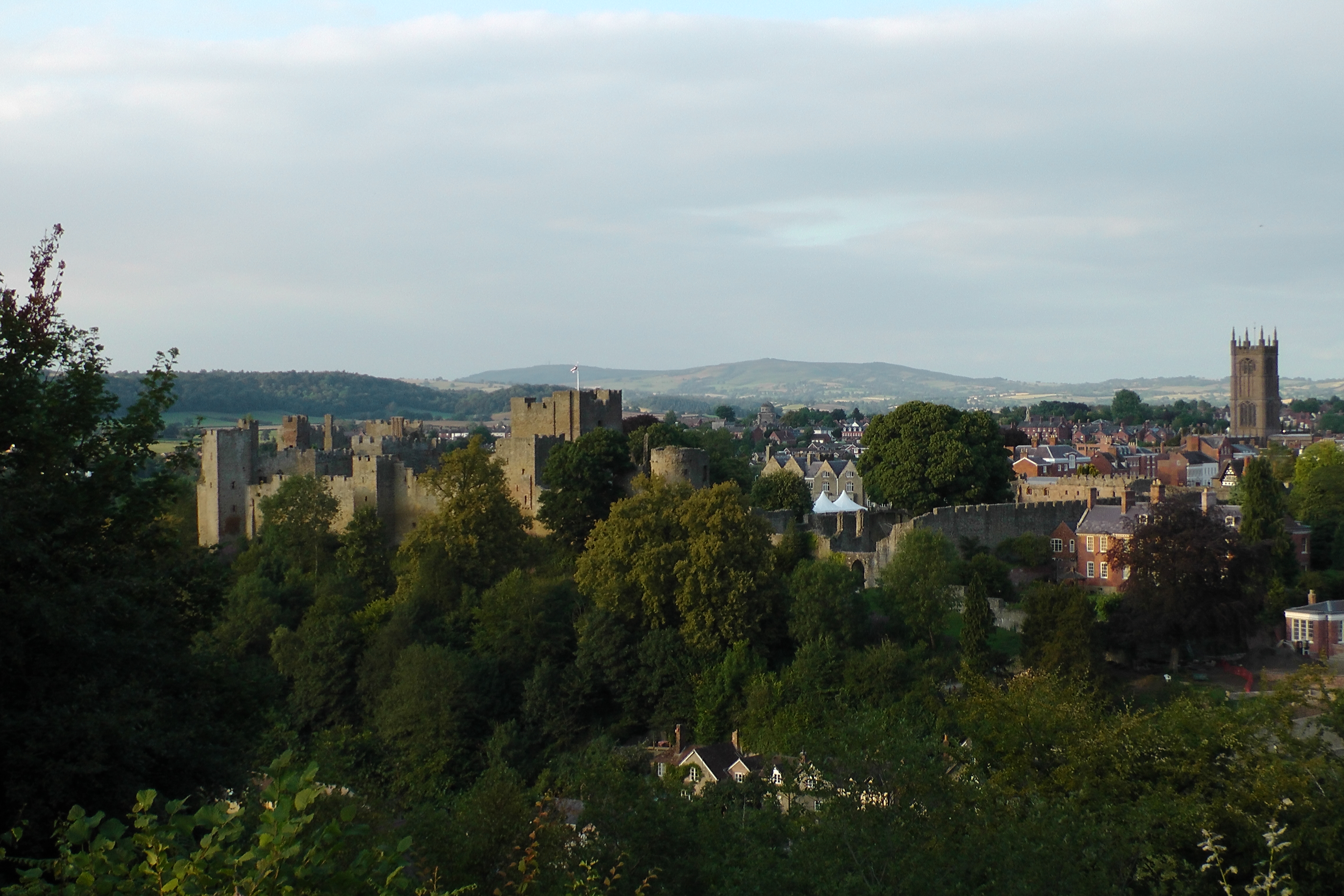
The town and castle viewed from the Whitcliffe, looking northeast; Brown Clee Hill looms in the distance.

The medieval settlement is largely on the top of a hill, with the castle, market place and parish church (St Laurence's) situated along the flat land on this hilltop, which has a maximum elevation of 111 metres (364 ft) at the castle, falling only gradually towards the east, with an elevation of 107 metres (351 ft) at the Buttercross.

The streets then run down to the Rivers Teme and Corve (their confluence being to the northwest of the centre of Ludlow) to the north and south. The surface of the Teme has an approximate elevation of 76 metres (249 ft) as it passes Ludford Bridge.

In the western part of the historic core, Dinham retains the character of a village, though dominated by the castle, with a road leading steeply down from Castle Square to the Teme and then over Dinham Bridge (an early 19th century replacement of an older bridge very slightly downstream). The old chapel in Dinham, a Grade II* listed building, though no longer used for worship, features the oldest built structure in Ludlow outside the castle. To the east a rolling landscape exists, and it is in this direction that the town has steadily grown. East Hamlet was the name of the settlement to the east of the town.

The growth of the town in this eastwards (and to the north-east) direction continues to the present day, with little or no development especially to the south or west, to an extent that the traditional town centre (the medieval town) is actually in the southwest corner of the entire settlement. It has also meant that the village of Ludford, immediately on the other side of the Teme at Ludford Bridge (itself at the foot of Lower Broad Street), remains a distinct community.

Localities in the town's suburbs include Gallows Bank and Sandpits. Immediately beyond the A49 by-pass are Rocks Green and the Sheet, and it is in these two places that much of the present development and growth of the town is taking place, including a Sainsbury's supermarket at Rocks Green. They are both approximately 1 mile (1.6 km) from the town centre.

=== Accolades ===
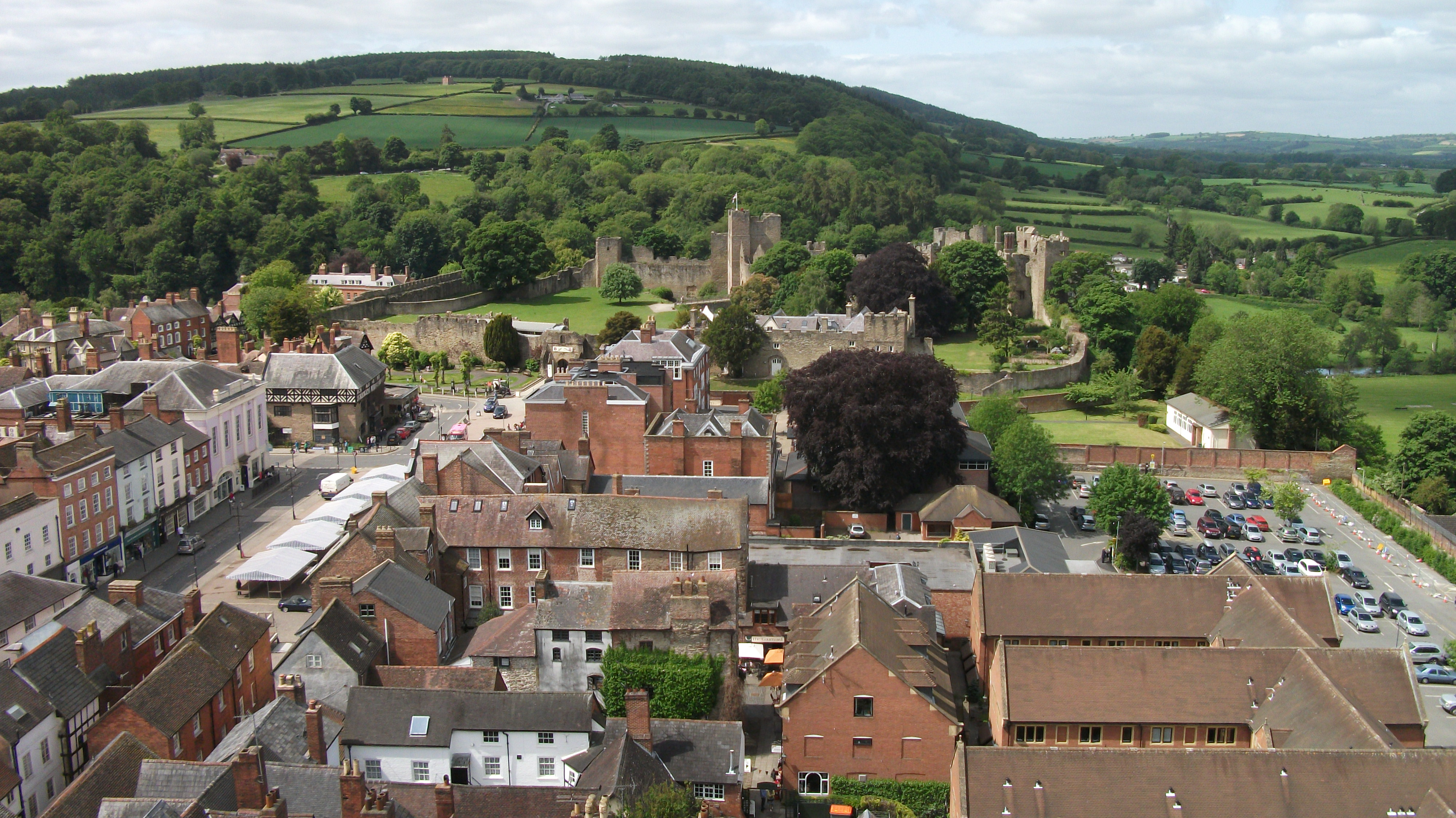
View from St Laurence's to the castle, looking west across the highest part of the medieval town.

The town has regularly been held in high esteem by academics and commentators in the areas of urbanism and architecture. Ludlow was winner of The Great Town Award (UK & Ireland) from The Academy of Urbanism in 2007. The first episode of the BBC television series Town, in which geographer Nicholas Crane examines the great towns of the United Kingdom, focused solely on Ludlow for the hour-long documentary. Ludlow also was one of the Six English Towns, a 1977 television programme by architectural historian Alec Clifton-Taylor.

The historic centre of Ludlow has largely escaped development that would otherwise alter its medieval, Tudor and Georgian character. Furthermore, the lack of development to the south and west allows for the town's historic setting (and particularly that of the castle) by the Teme and the neighbouring countryside to be readily appreciated in the modern day. M.R.G. Conzen remarked of Ludlow "Its composite medieval town plan and a history of eight and a half centuries with several periods of considerable importance have endowed its Old Town with an historically well-stratified and richly textured landscape." Michael Raven, who created a detailed gazetteer of all the settlements of Herefordshire and Shropshire in the late 20th century, stated that "There can be little doubt that Ludlow is the finest town in Shropshire."

The medieval street plan remains, though the town walls and gates have disappeared in many places. Mill Street and Broad Street, leading down from the very centre to the Teme in the south, are particularly famous for their rich architectural heritage and vistas, with many fine Georgian buildings. Sir Nikolaus Pevsner described Broad Street as "one of the most memorable streets in England".

== Population ==
The 2011 UK census recorded 10,266 people living in Ludlow's civil parish. A further 673 live in the neighbouring Ludford parish to the south, meaning the population for the town and adjoining settlements is approximately 11,000. The 2021 Census showed a population of 10,039 in Ludlow parish and still 673 in Ludford parish, giving a total of 10,712, plus about a further 1,000 in neighbouring parishes within the three county wards of Ludlow East, North and South.

=== Historical ===
In 1377, poll tax was levied against 1,172 of the parish's residents. By this measure, Ludlow was the 35th most populous town in England.

Population growth in Ludlow since 1801
Year	1801	1811	1821	1831	1841	1851	1881	1891	1901	1911	1921	1931	1951	1961	1971	1987	2001	2011	2021
Population	3,897	4,150	4,820	5,253	5,064	4,691	5,035	4,460	4,552	5,926	5,674	5,642	6,456	6,796	7,470	7,450	9,548	10,266	10,039
Source: A Vision of Britain through Time and the Office for National Statistics

== Transport ==
=== Railways ===
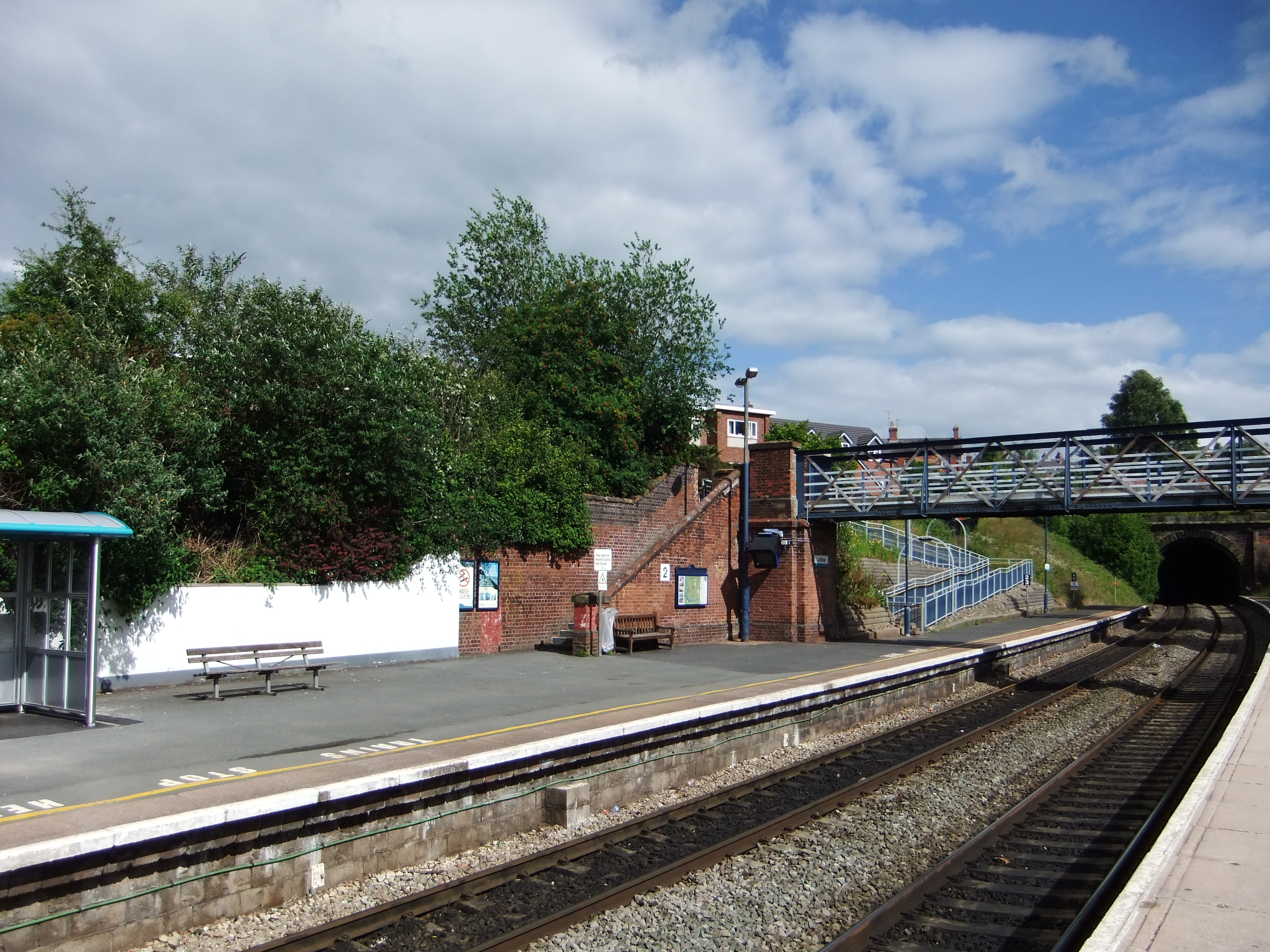
The southbound platform at Ludlow station

Ludlow railway station began serving the town in 1852 and is about five minutes' walk from the town centre. It is on the Welsh Marches Line and is served by trains between Manchester Piccadilly, Crewe, Shrewsbury, Hereford, Abergavenny, Cardiff Central and Swansea; these are operated by Transport for Wales.

There is a short tunnel to the south of the station, which runs under Gravel Hill. Clee Hill Junction existed just to the north of the station, with a goods line leading off the main line up to the quarries on Titterstone Clee Hill.

=== Buses ===
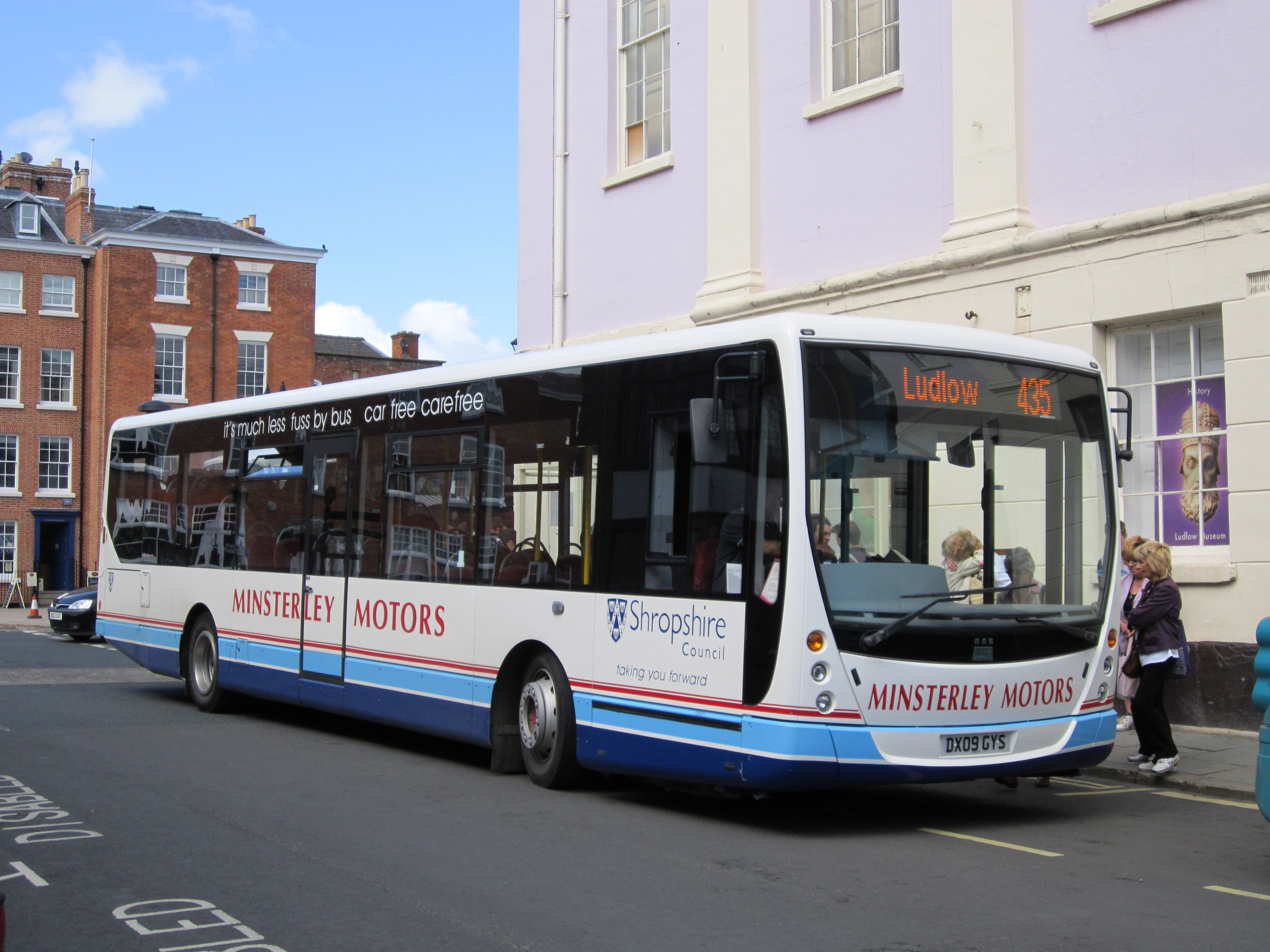
A Minsterley Motors Plaxton Centro

Bus services in the area are operated by Diamond Bus, Lugg Valley Travel and Minsterley Motors. Routes link the town with Church Stretton, Kidderminster and Shrewsbury; there is also a park and ride service, on a circular route.

=== Roads ===
On 4 February 1980, the £4.7 million single-carriageway by-pass road was officially opened by Kenneth Clarke. The by-pass had been built to the east of Ludlow in the late 1970s, opening to traffic in the summer of 1979, and diverts the A49 trunk road around the town. The former route of the A49 through the town was reclassified as the B4361.

The town centre retains its medieval streets and has had long-running problems with motor traffic and car parking, which is now restricted seven days a week. There is a town centre residents' parking permit scheme in operation. Council-owned car parks exist in a number of locations in Ludlow to cater for much of the long-stay car parking. The Eco-Park is situated on the eastern outskirts of the town, at the Sheet and adjacent to the A49.

The A4117 begins at the Rocks Green roundabout on the Ludlow by-pass and runs across the Clee Hills to Cleobury Mortimer; it then continues via the A456 onwards to Bewdley and Kidderminster.

Two historic bridges cross the River Teme at Ludlow: Ludford Bridge (a Scheduled Ancient Monument) and Dinham Bridge (early 19th century, Grade II listed); both of which still take vehicular traffic as no modern bridges have been built over the Teme in the area. To the north of the town centre, the historic Corve Bridge crosses the River Corve and this bridge was relieved by Burway Bridge in the mid-20th century. However, on 26 June 2007, dramatic flooding on the Corve caused the Burway Bridge to collapse, severing a gas main and causing 20 homes in nearby Corve Street to be evacuated. The old stone bridge has now been replaced with a modern steel and pre-fabricated concrete construction.

=== Cycling ===
National Cycle Network route 44 runs over Dinham and Ludford Bridges (via Camp and Silkmill Lanes in-between) en route from Bromfield to Pipe Aston. It is known as the Six Castles Cycleway, with Ludlow Castle as one of the six.

=== Walking ===
The Mortimer Trail, a long-distance footpath, runs from Ludlow to Kington, Herefordshire.

== Culture ==
=== Festivals and fairs ===
The now-defunct Ludlow Festival was held annually from 1960, during June and July each year. An open area within the castle served as the stage and backdrop for various Shakespearean plays, while a number of supporting events at various venues included classical and pop/rock concerts, varied musicians, lecture talks from public figures, and entertainers. The 54-year-old Festival which had been "loss-making" collapsed in 2014 due to "financial troubles". Organisers said it was "simply not commercially viable".

The Medieval Christmas Fayre continued to take place until 2019, the Covid 19 pandemic meant that the 2020 and 2021 Fayres could not go ahead. It was set up for 2022 but a storm caused damage the night before and meant it was cancelled at last minute. The financial impact meant that the festival organisers folded.

The Medieval Christmas Fayre was replaced by the Ludlow Winter festival in 2023 and was due to take place again in November 2024

=== Gastronomy ===
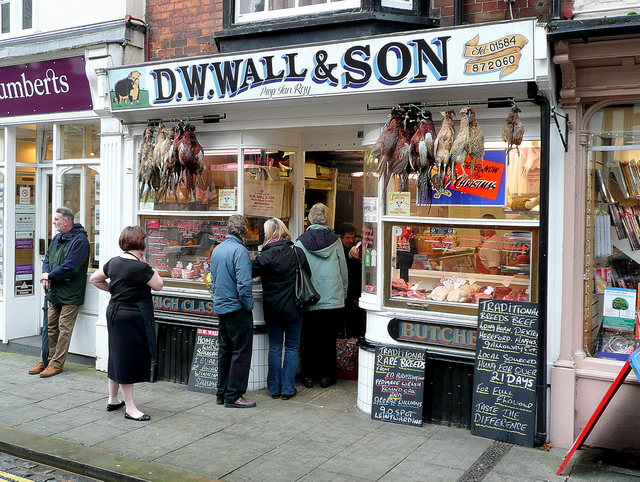
One of the two remaining traditional butcher shops in the centre of the town

Ludlow was for a time a gastronomic centre, at one point the only town in England with three Michelin-starred restaurants. The town had boasted eight AA Rosette starred restaurants, and three Michelin-starred establishments. In 2016, Ludlow lost its last Michelin-starred establishment — Mr Underhills — which had featured in the Sunday Times Top 100 Restaurants. Another previously starred establishment in Ludlow was La Bécasse which went into liquidation for the second time in 2014.

The town hosts the annual Ludlow food festival. Ludlow was the first UK member of Cittaslow or "slow food" movement, but after ongoing controversy over public funding, the town is no longer a member. As of 2021, the town has three butchers (one located in the suburbs), four bakers, a regular farmers market and a range of specialist food shops. The town has a brewery which has been producing real ale (using local hops) since 2006; it is in a renovated goods shed near the railway station.

The annual Ludlow Marches Festival of Food & Drink is a trade fair that takes place in and around Ludlow in September. Centred on Ludlow Castle, where over 150 local, small food producers showcase and sell their wares, the three-day event involves the town centre in food and drink trails including a "Sausage Trail".

=== Arts ===
The town is home to an arts and cinema centre, The Ludlow Assembly Rooms, that hosts live and streamed music, theatre, stand-up comedy and talks. It acts as an arts community centre, has a visual arts gallery, and on most evenings, shows a film, from a wide variety of genres (including classic, arthouse, and blockbuster). Ludlow is now also home to the Rooftop Theatre Company. Originally from the South East, they have been delivering contemporary-styled Shakespeare since 2003. Their first Ludlow production was The Comedy of Errors in 2014.

Ludlow has featured in movies and TV programmes including Tom Sharpe's Blott on the Landscape and 1990s TV adaptations of The History of Tom Jones, a Foundling and Moll Flanders. In Shakespeare's Richard III, Ludlow is mentioned, as the place where the young Edward V is to be fetched as Richard III plots to seize the crown. The town is described as the capital of Wales following a zombie apocalypse in the novel World War Z.

Ludlow has connections with a number of figures in the arts – including Alfred Edward Housman, poet and author of "A Shropshire Lad" (his ashes were buried in the graveyard of St Laurence's Church and were marked by a cherry tree). Stanley J. Weyman, the novelist known as the "Prince of Romance", was born in Ludlow, as was sculptor Adrian Jones, whose ashes are buried in the same churchyard. The naval historian and novelist Captain Geoffrey Bennett (Sea Lion) lived in Ludlow after his retirement in 1974 up to his death in 1983 and his ashes, too, were interred in the parish churchyard.

=== Sport ===
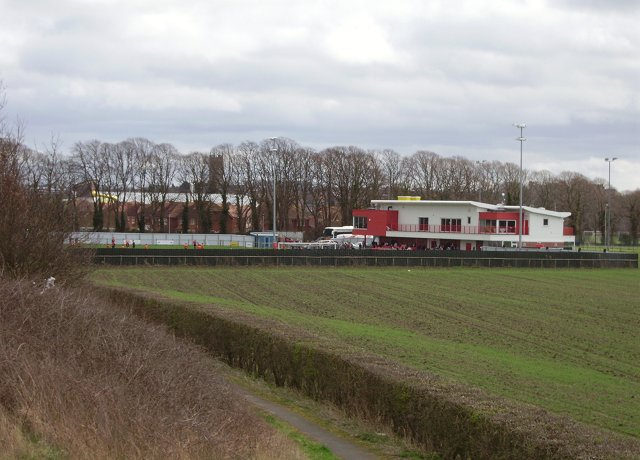
Ludlow's football stadium, located at Burway on the northern edge of the town (actually in Bromfield civil parish), was home to AFC Ludlow and several other sports teams.

The town had a football team (AFC Ludlow), which competed in the West Midlands (Regional) League Division One. The club could no longer field a full team, and folded in June 2016. Ludlow's rugby union club have their ground situated just off Linney near the castle, competing in the Midland league. There is a cricket club sporting its 1st and 2nd XI teams in the Shropshire Premier Cricket League and its 3rd and 4th XI in the Shropshire Cricket League Division 5 and Division 6 respectively. The cricket ground is near the junction of Burway Lane and Bromfield Road in the north of the town and has a picturesque setting with the castle, St Laurence's church and surrounding hills and countryside clearly visible.

Ludlow Racecourse and Ludlow Golf Club are situated together just off the A49 road 2 miles (3.2 km) northwest of the town centre, at a place called Old Field near Bromfield. A smaller (9-hole) golf course exists at Elm Lodge, just off Fishmore Road on the northern edge of the town.

A privately run leisure and fitness centre, which includes a swimming pool, is on Bromfield Road on the northern edge of the town (near the secondary school). Lawn bowls is played in the area, with several teams from Ludlow's two bowling clubs (Burway and Ludlow Castle) playing against each other and teams from further afield, in the Ludlow & District Bowls League, as well as in the higher Shropshire leagues. There is an amateur boxing club, situated on Wheeler Road, with its new clubhouse opening in 2014.

=== Media ===
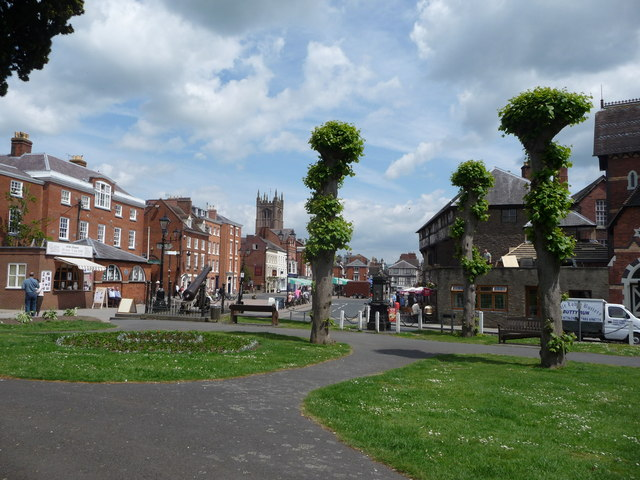
Castle Square looking east towards St Laurence's Church. Ludlow College is to the left; Castle Lodge to the right.

==== Newspapers ====
The Ludlow Advertiser was founded in 1855 by John Crosse, with its original offices at 18 King Street. New premises for the Advertiser were constructed in 1914 on Upper Galdeford, still called the Advertiser Buildings, but now a fast-food outlet. It has published an edition weekly ever since, though is now the Ludlow and Tenbury Wells Advertiser and published from the Hereford Times offices in Hereford. The current free paper is the Teme Valley Times, founded in 2006. In 2010 the Ludlow Journal, a free weekly newspaper, ceased publication and was absorbed into its paid-for sister, the South Shropshire Journal. The Shropshire Star – with its related publication the South Shropshire Journal – is published in Ketley and had an office in Ludlow, at The Angel on Broad Street, but this closed in 2017. The magazine publisher Newsfield was based in Ludlow.

==== Television ====
Regional TV news is provided by BBC West Midlands and ITV Central. Television signals are received from the Ridge Hill and the local relay transmitters.

==== Radio stations ====
Sunshine Radio, once a pirate radio station, is now a legitimate commercial broadcaster in the south Shropshire and north Herefordshire/Worcestershire. Other radio stations include its sister station in Hereford, and BBC Radio Shropshire.

BBC Hereford and Worcester's 1584 AM and Sunshine Radio's 105.9 FM broadcasts are made from the Woofferton transmitting station, just south of Ludlow, which is notable for its Cold War history and now being the UK's only remaining shortwave broadcasting site.

== Governance ==
=== Civic ===
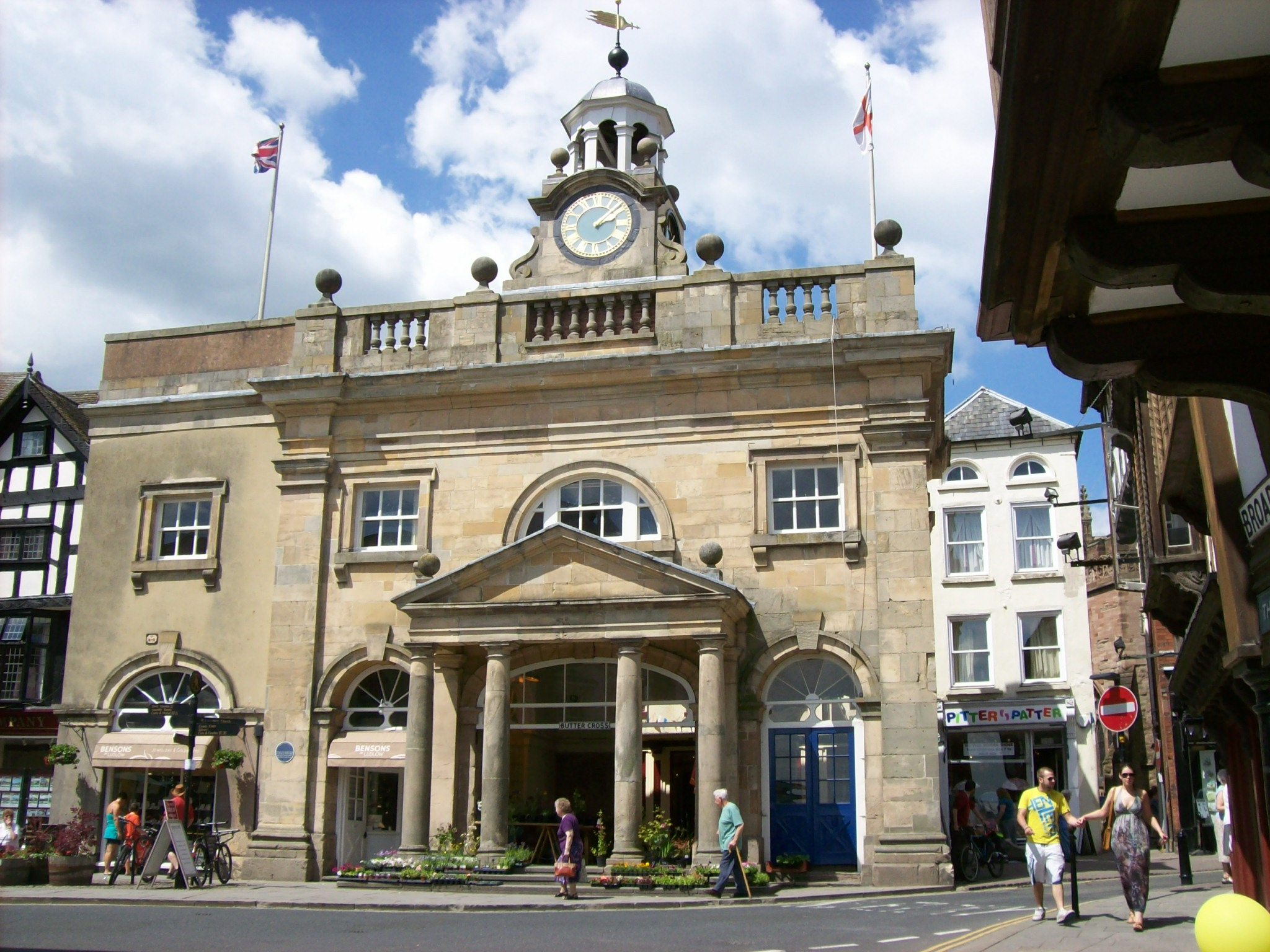
The Buttercross, built in 1743–1746, at the top of Broad Street and the highest point of the medieval town (the site of the High Cross); historically this spot was used as a benchmark for road distances to Ludlow.

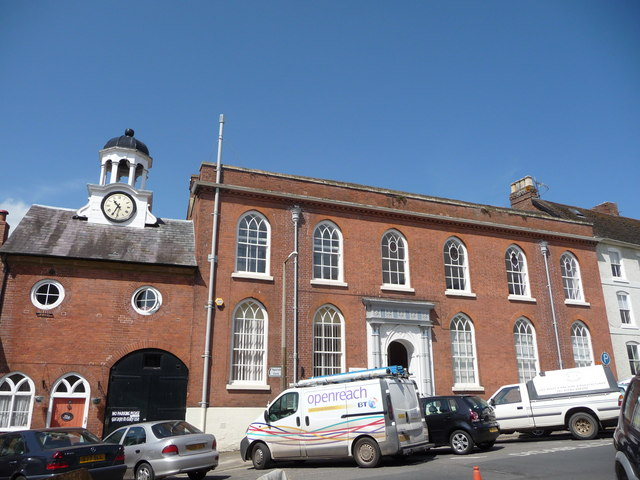
Ludlow Guildhall

Ludlow is a civil parish with a town council and a mayor. Ludlow was a borough from 1461 to 1974 (becoming a municipal borough in 1835 and a rural borough in 1967); the borough encompassed the same area as Ludlow's parish until the mid-late 19th century. Its borough status meant Ludlow was largely autonomous from the hundred of Munslow which it lay in.

Wider local government was provided by Ludlow Rural District from 1894 (this rural district absorbed the borough of Ludlow in 1967, causing the change in status to a rural borough) until 1974 when South Shropshire District Council (with Ludlow as its seat) took over along with Shropshire County Council in a two-tier arrangement. Rural boroughs were abolished in 1974 and Ludlow's borough status at that point ended. The district councils of Shropshire were abolished in 2009 and the county now has a unitary authority called Shropshire Council, based in Shrewsbury. The South Shropshire District Council's offices at Stone House on Corve Street were gradually emptied of local government staff until their sale in 2014.

The town council is based at Ludlow Guildhall on Mill Street, a grade I listed building, which was the home of the town's county and magistrates' courts until their closure in 2011. There was a Town Hall, situated in the Square, which was built in 1887–1888 and demolished in March 1986; it featured prominently just prior to its demolition in the 1985 television drama Blott on the Landscape. The other notable civic building in the centre of town is the Buttercross (named as it was the butter market at the site of the medieval High Cross); it was the home of the town council after the demolition of the Town Hall and prior to the closure of the courts. It is now an 'interpretation centre' for the town's architectural heritage.

=== Electoral arrangements ===
The boundaries of Ludlow's wards and electoral divisions were most recently reviewed in 2008.

Fifteen councillors sit on the town council, representing seven wards, and elections (when contested) are held every four years (at the same time as elections to Shropshire Council). The seven wards changed slightly in 2008, retaining their previous names and number of councillors they each return – they are (with the number of town councillors returned given): Rockspring (2), Hayton (2), Bringewood (2), Corve (2), Whitcliffe (2), Gallows Bank (3), and Clee View (2).

Ludlow together with nearby parishes comprise three electoral divisions, each returning one councillor to Shropshire Council in elections held every four years, the most recent being in 2021. The electoral divisions comprise:

- Ludlow North (the wards of Corve, Whitcliffe and Bringewood together with the parish of Bromfield)
- Ludlow East (the wards of Hayton, Clee View and Rockspring)
- Ludlow South (Gallows Bank and the parishes of Ludford, Richard's Castle, Ashford Bowdler and Ashford Carbonel).

=== Civil parishes ===
Ludford is a separate civil parish, with its own parish council, and covers the adjoining places of Ludford, Foldgate, Steventon, the Sheet and Rocks Green. Until 1901 an area of land at the foot of Old Street, called Holdgate Fee, was a detached part of Ludford parish in the town itself. Ludlow Castle was a parish of its own, contained within the castle's walls and the immediate hillside; it was abolished in 1901 and ceded to Ludlow's civil parish. Other than Ludford, the only other civil parish in the present-day that neighbours Ludlow is Bromfield.

The civil parish of East Hamlet, created in 1884 covered a limited area to the east of the town; this parish was largely absorbed by Ludlow's parish as the town expanded into it (in 1901, 1934 and finally in 1987 when it was abolished). Ludlow's parish in 1901 expanded into Ludford to the east (taking in Holdgate Fee and the Steventon New Road area); another two expansions into Ludford in 1934 involved taking in the Whitcliffe (which had been acquired by the burgesses of Ludlow already in the 13th century) and a further part to the east (the Gallows Bank area). 1934 also saw a significant expansion of the Ludlow parish west into Bromfield's parish, on both sides of the Teme; this coupled with the inclusion of Whitcliffe constitutes the western, essentially rural part to Ludlow's civil parish in the present day.

=== Parliament ===
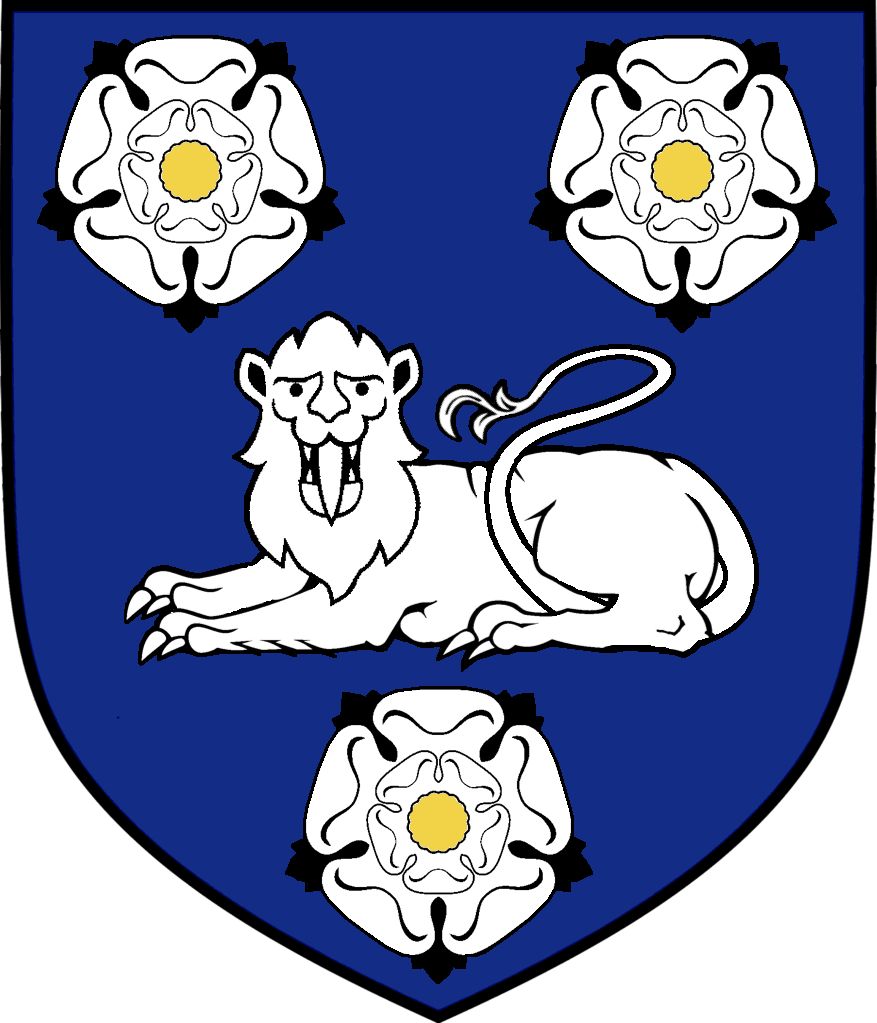
The coat of arms of Ludlow date to the creation of the parliamentary borough and pay homage to Richard, Duke of York. It displays the white lion of the Earl of March surrounded by three white roses of the House of York

For representation to the House of Commons, Ludlow falls within the South Shropshire constituency, which has its origins in the Ludlow parliamentary borough constituency created in 1473, and which until 1868 returned two burgesses to Parliament.

In modern times, the Ludlow constituency came to cover a large area of southern Shropshire including Bridgnorth and after constituency boundary changes was redesignated South Shropshire ahead of the 2024 general election when the current member, Stuart Anderson of the Conservative Party, was elected.

== Economy ==
McConnel Limited, a manufacturer of hedge cutting and verge mowing machinery, is based in Ludlow, occupying a seven-acre industrial site in the Temeside/Weeping Cross area of the town known as the Temeside Works. The company claims to be the innovator of the first tractor-mounted hedge cutting machine (produced in 1945) and a leading producer of reach flail mower hedge and verge mowing power-arm technology.

=== Market ===
The town has regular outdoor markets held on Castle Square, an area that was enlarged in 1986 with the demolition of the Town Hall (which was also known as Market Hall). General markets are held on Mondays, Wednesdays, Fridays and Saturdays. Specialist markets (examples being crafts, antiques, local produce) are held on occasional Thursdays and Sundays. They are run by the town council.

== Education ==
Ludlow has two primary schools for children aged 5–11 and a secondary school – the Ludlow Church of England School — for pupils aged 11–16.

Ludlow College is a sixth form college in the town centre, formed by the merger of the town's boys grammar school and girls high school. Prior to its merger with Herefordshire College in 2012 it was one of the oldest educational institutions in the country, dating back some 800 years.

== Health ==
Ludlow Hospital is an NHS community hospital at the junction of Gravel Hill and New Road. It had until recently several inpatient and outpatient departments and wards, as well as a minor injuries unit.

There are two doctors' surgeries in the town, both just off Upper Galdeford.

== Emergency services ==
The Shropshire Fire and Rescue Service have a fire station on Weeping Cross Lane, staffed by retained firefighters.

West Mercia Police have a police station on Lower Galdeford. Its front counter closed in 2015.

Voluntary aid society, the British Red Cross, has a hall in the Smithfield car park, just off Lower Galdeford, and adjacent to the fire station.

== Religion ==
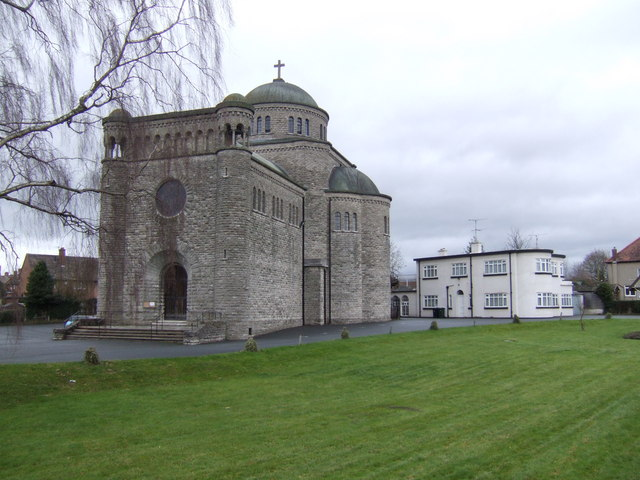
St Peter's church, built in the late 1930s in the neo-Byzantine and plain Romanesque styles, is the town's Roman Catholic church

There are two Church of England parishes in Ludlow and two Church of England churches – the large and historic St Laurence's Church in the centre of the town – and the 19th century St John's Church on Gravel Hill. Within St Laurence's Church are the St John's, Lady and St Catherine's chapels. Ludford has its own Church of England parish and church, dedicated to St Giles.

Ludlow falls within the Church of England's Diocese of Hereford and between 1981 and 2020 was a suffragan see with its own suffragan bishop, the Bishop of Ludlow, the only such bishop in the diocese. There has long been an Archdeacon of Ludlow, historically known as the Archdeacon of Shropshire, overseeing the other parishes in the southern part of the county (the part of the Hereford diocese that is within Shropshire).

The Roman Catholic church of St Peter is on Henley Road. Construction to a design by the Welsh-based Italian architect Giuseppe Rinvolucri began in 1935, using stone from nearby Farlow and building in a neo-Byzantine and plain Romanesque style. The construction also involved novel reinforced concrete technology. The Byzantine design continues inside, with a blue dome with twelve gold-leaf stars representing St Peter and the other Apostles. An Art Deco presbytery was built next to the church. St Mary Magdalene's chapel, within the castle, is now a ruin although it was restored and roofed in 2018 and is open as a wedding venue.

Ludlow has a Methodist church on Broad Street, a Quaker Meeting House on St Mary's Lane, a Baptist church at the Rockspring Community Centre, and an Elim Pentecostal church off the Smithfield car park.

Two monastic institutions once existed in Ludlow – one Augustinian ("Austin") Friars on the corner of Lower Galdeford and Weeping Cross Lane, and the other Carmelite ("White") Friars between Linney and Corve Street. Both were dissolved in 1538. The White Friars site became the town's cemetery in 1824, with a new church constructed, dedicated to St Leonard (a St Leonard's chapel existed on the corner of Corve Street and Linney in medieval times). The St Leonard's graveyard and church still exist but are no longer used for burials or worship (instead the church building is now a commercial premises). The Austin Friars site became the town's livestock market (the Smithfield) and is now a public car park.

== Landmarks ==
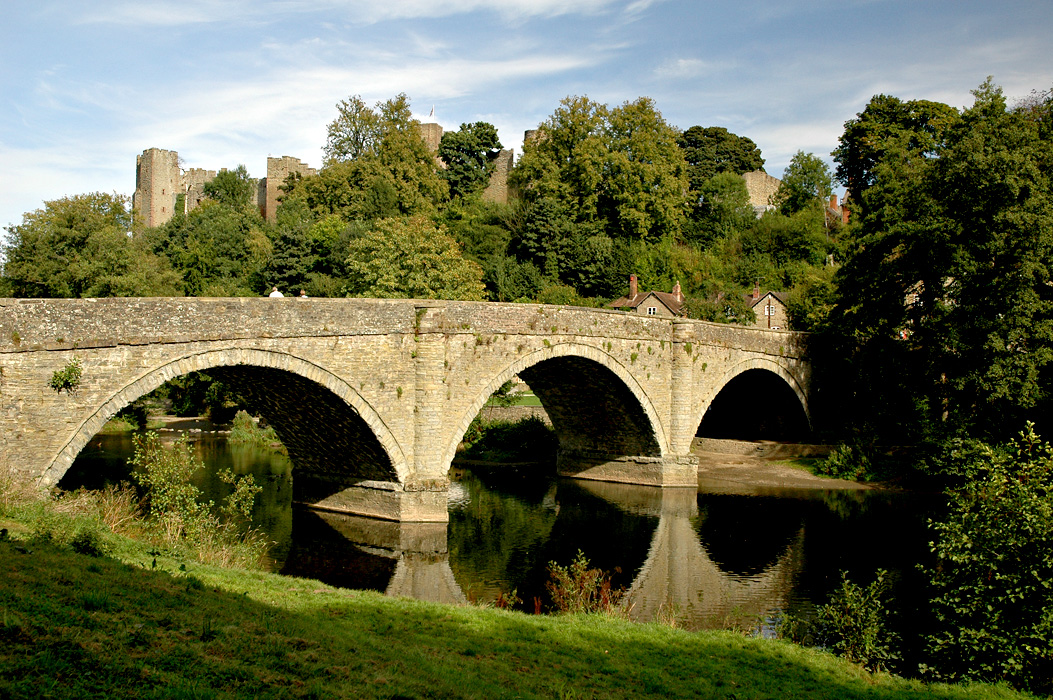
Dinham Bridge crossing the River Teme; Ludlow Castle is situated above on the hill

The following are the principal landmark buildings and structures in the town, the majority of which are grade I or II* listed buildings.

- Ludlow Castle
- St Laurence's Church
- Feathers Hotel
- The Buttercross
- Ludford Bridge
- Horseshoe Weir (immediately downstream of Ludford Bridge)
- Dinham Bridge
- Castle Lodge
- Reader's House, rear of St Laurence's
- The Broad Gate
- 1 Broad Street (Bodenhams)
- St Thomas Chapel, Dinham
- Dinham House & Dinham Lodge
- Hosyers Almshouses, College Street
- Palmers Hall, Ludlow College, Mill Street
- The Guildhall, Mill Street
- Old Stone House & Tudor House, Corve Street
- Fishmore Hall Hotel

== Twinning ==
Ludlow has three twinning arrangements.

- La Ferté-Macé, Orne, France (since 1986)
- San Pietro in Cariano, Province of Verona, Veneto, Italy (since 1989)
- Narberth, Pembrokeshire, Wales (since 2003)

== Notable people ==
=== Aristocracy, public servants and politicians ===
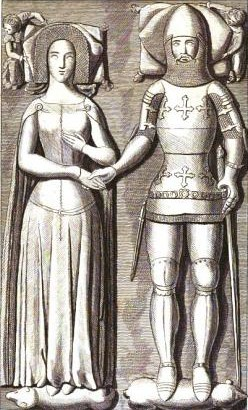
Katherine Mortimer and Thomas de Beauchamp

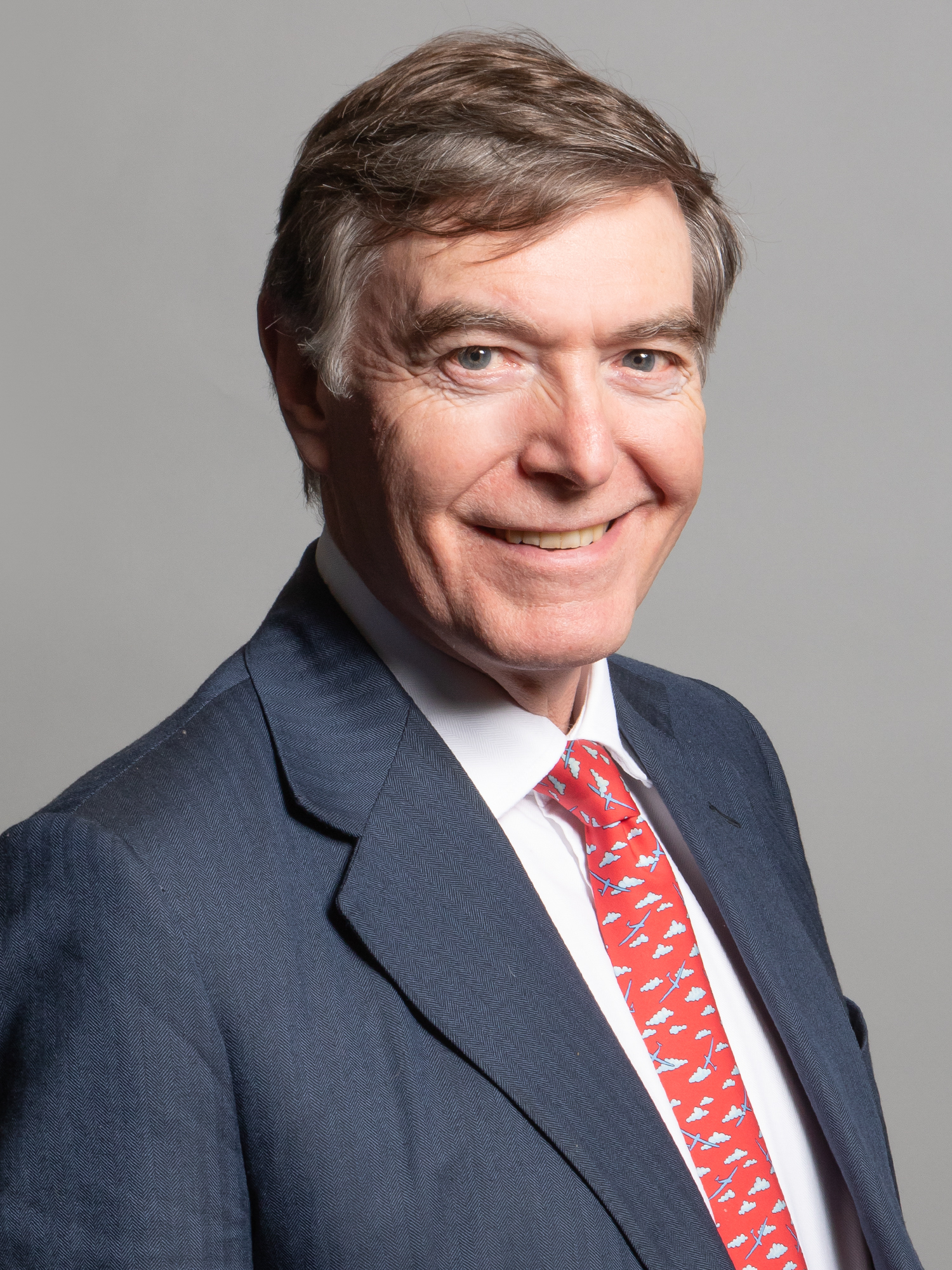
Philip Dunne, 2020

- Katherine Mortimer, Countess of Warwick (ca. 1314 in Ludlow Castle – 1369), aristocrat, wife of Thomas Beauchamp, 11th Earl of Warwick
- Lady Philippa Mortimer (1375-1400) and Sir Edmund Mortimer (1376 - 1409)., two of the children of Edmund Mortimer, 3rd Earl of March, and Philippa Plantagenet (the only child of Lionel, 1st Duke of Clarence, and Elizabeth de Burgh, Countess of Ulster) were born in Ludlow Castle
- Robert Mascall (died 1416), medieval Carmelite friar, Bishop of Hereford, 1404 / 1416, was born at Ludlow.
- Sir John Bridgeman (1568/69 – 1638), a Chief Justice of The Marches in the 17th century is buried in St Laurence's church, within a tomb monument attributed to Francesco Fanelli.
- Sir Timothy Littleton (ca.1608 – 1679) judge and politician, MP for Ludlow, 1660 / 1670.
- Admiral James Vashon (1742–1827) lived in Ludlow, on Broad Street, following his distinguished service in the Royal Navy. He died in the town and is buried at St Laurence's. A civic society blue plaque commemorates him at 54 Broad Street; there is a Vashon Close in Ludlow's eastern suburbs.
- Thomas Johnes (1748 in Ludlow – 1816) an MP, landscape architect, farmer, writer and social benefactor.
- Sir William Jukes-Steward (1841–1912), later Speaker of the New Zealand House of Representatives, had a boyhood home marked by plaque in Ludlow, where he attended the Grammar School,
- Uvedale Corbett (1909–2005) a British Lieutenant-Colonel, politician, businessman and Conservative MP for Ludlow 1945 / 1951.
- Philip Dunne (born 1958 in Ludlow), was MP for Ludlow 2005 / 2024.

=== The Arts ===
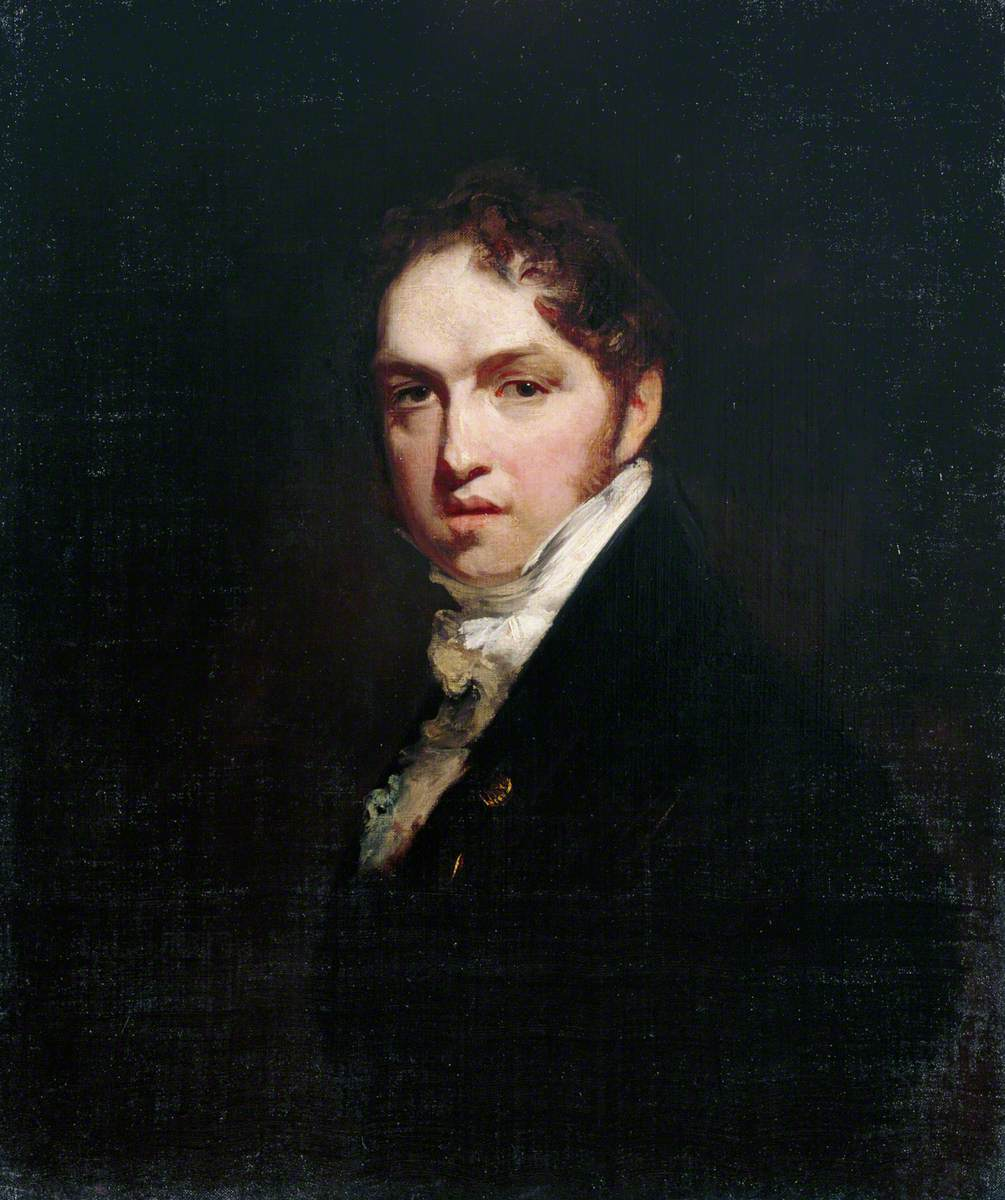
William Owen, self-portrait, ca.1800

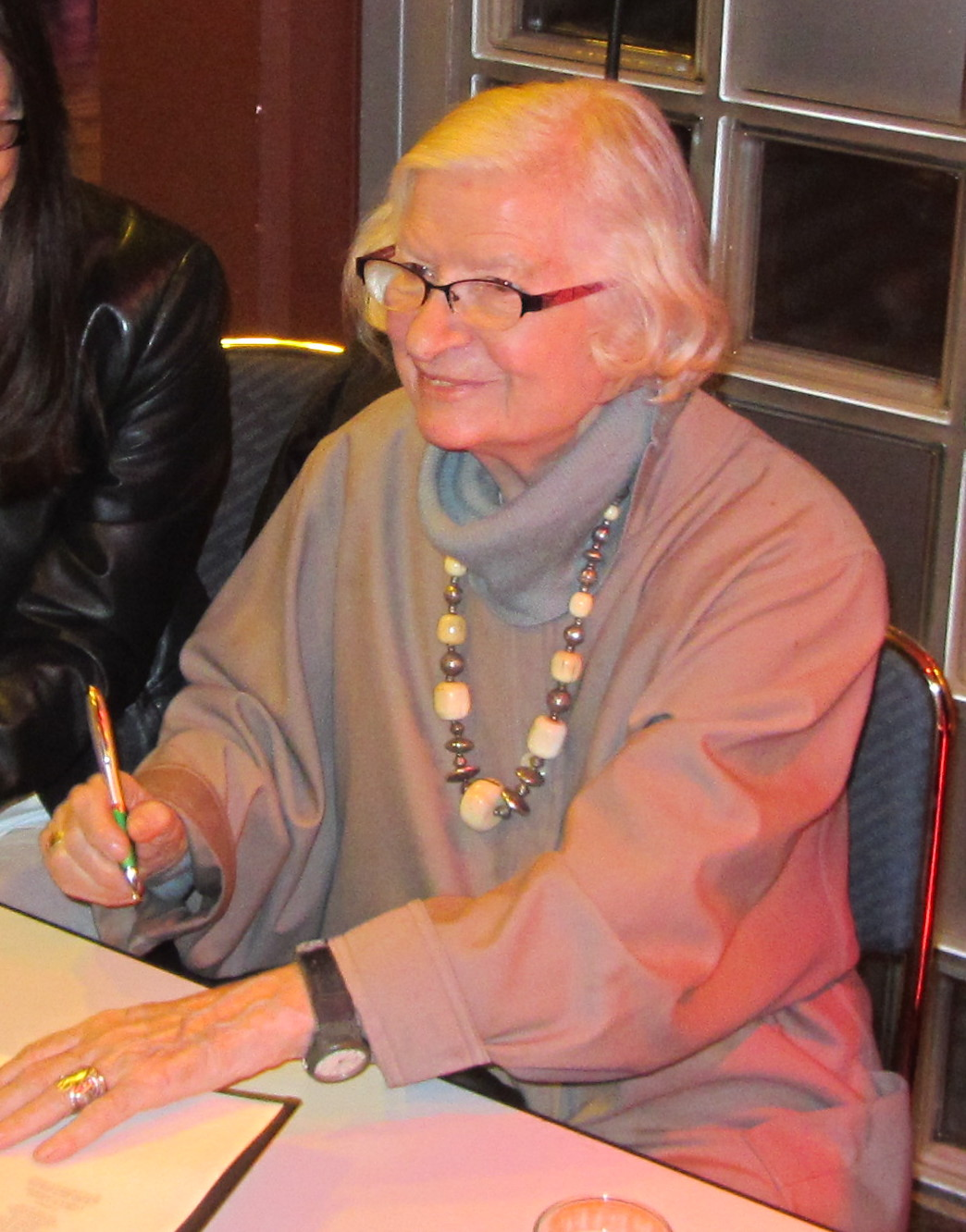
P.D. James, 2013

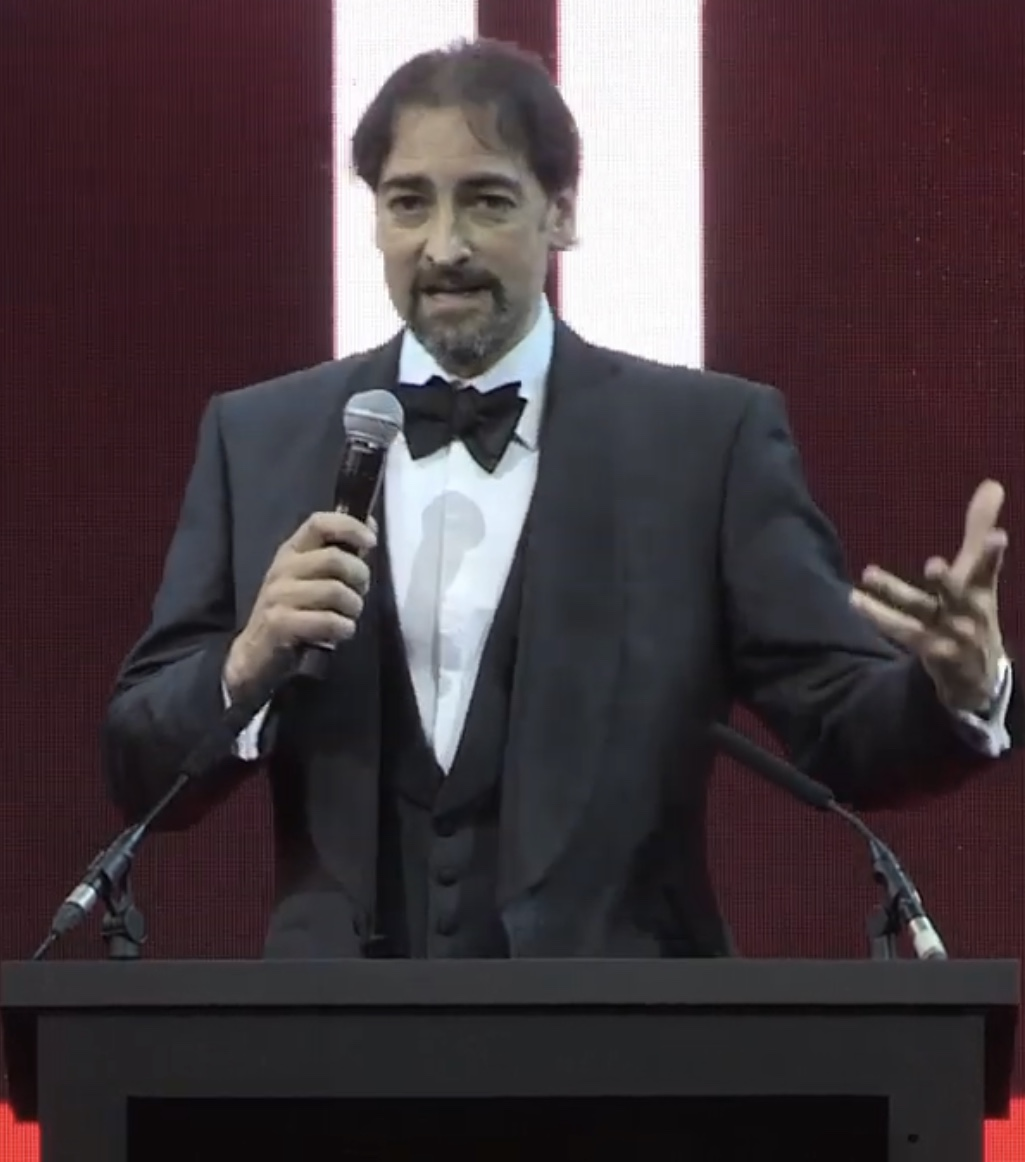
Alistair McGowan, 2016

- Thomas Holland (1549 in Ludlow – 1612) Calvinist scholar, theologian and translator of the King James Version of the Bible.
- Samuel Butler (1613–1680), poet, lived at Ludlow while working as steward to the Lord President of the Marches in 1661–62, during which time he completed the first part of his well-known satire Hudibras.
- Thomas Johnes FRS (1748 in Ludlow–1816), MP, landscape architect, farmer, printer, writer and social benefactor.
- Samuel Scott (1702–1772), painter, moved to Ludlow in 1765,
- William Owen (1769 in Ludlow–1825), portrait painter.
- Thomas Wright (1810–1877), an English antiquarian and writer.
- Charles Badham (1813 in Ludlow–1884), classical philologist, textual critic, headmaster, and university professor.
- Henry Peach Robinson (1830 in Ludlow–1901), pictorialist photographer.
- Adrian Jones (1845 in Ludlow–1938), sculptor, his works included the Peace Quadriga on the London Wellington Arch
- Stanley J. Weyman (1855 in Ludlow – 1928) an English writer of historical romance.
- A. E. Housman, classicist and poet, author of A Shropshire Lad, whose ashes are buried outside St Laurence's Church
- Captain Geoffrey Bennett (1909–1983), naval officer and author, writing novels such as Sea Lion and naval histories, he retired to a cottage in central Ludlow in 1976, where he died.
- Fred Griffiths (1912 in Ludlow–1994), an English film and television actor.
- P. D. James, Baroness James of Holland Park (1920–2014) spent part of her youth in Ludlow and attended the British School there.
- Fr. John Fitzgerald (1927–2007) a Carmelite friar, priest, poet and philosopher was from Ludlow.
- Anthony Howard (1934–2010), senior political journalist, obituary writer and social commentator; had a home there.
- Dick Heckstall-Smith (1934–2004) from Ludlow was an English jazz and blues saxophonist.
- Sheena Porter (1935-2010) a British author of children's novels, lived in Ludlow.
- John Challis (1942–2021), actor, he played Boycie in Only Fools & Horses lived near Ludlow.
- Kate Charles (born 1950) an American crime writer, lives in Ludlow.
- Lucy Jones (born 1955) a British painter and printmaker, lives in Ludlow.
- Alistair McGowan (born 1964), impressionist, lives in Ludlow, where he is patron of the Ludlow Fringe Festival where he has performed live.
- Holly Davidson (born 1980), actress (from Casualty and The Bill) grew up locally.
- Hollie Robertson (born 1985), winner of the BBC's Strictly Dance Fever in 2006 is from Ludlow.

=== Academia, science and business ===
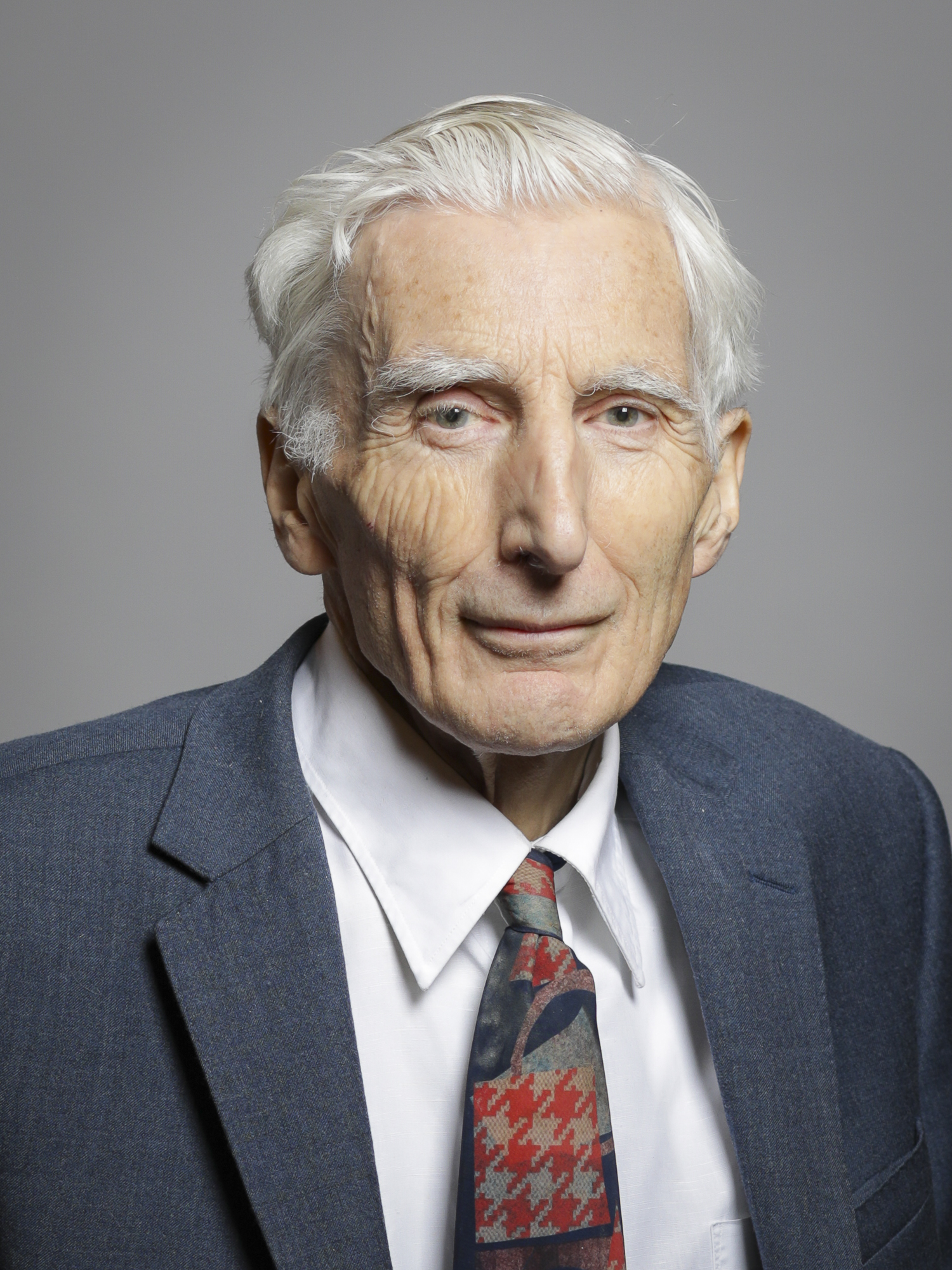
Lord Rees of Ludlow, 2019

- John Senex (1678–1740) cartographer, engraver and explorer.
- Molly Morgan (1762 in Ludlow as Mary Jones -1835) lived in the area until transported in 1788 as a convict to Australia, where she eventually became a landowner and benefactor in New South Wales.
- Sir Charles Hastings (1794 in Ludlow – 1866), was a pioneering Victorian doctor and founder of the British Medical Association.
- Henry Hill Hickman (1800–1830), a very early pioneer of anaesthetics, at Lady Halton, near Bromfield.
- Thomas Taylor Lewis (1801 in Ludlow–1858), geologist and antiquarian.
- Cardale Babington (1808 in Ludlow–1895), botanist, entomologist, and archaeologist.
- Charles Badham (1813 in Ludlow–1884), a Victorian scholar and professor at Sydney University
- Charles Lethbridge Kingsford (1862 in Ludlow–1926), historian, his father was headmaster at Ludlow Grammar School.
- John Marston (1836–1918), the founder of the Sunbeam racing car and motorcycle company.
- Martin Rees, Baron Rees of Ludlow (born 1942), the fifteenth Astronomer Royal, is associated with the town where he grew up,

=== Sport ===
- Cyril Lello (1920 in Ludlow–1997), a footballer, notably for Shrewsbury Town and Everton.
- Jamie Tolley (born 1983), a footballer who has played over 330 games, incl. 180 for Shrewsbury Town
- Harry Burgoyne (born 1996 in Ludlow), a footballer who played for Shrewsbury Town until 2024.
- Lark Atkin-Davies (born 1995), a rugby union player, she has played 62 games for England women.

== See also ==
- Listed buildings in Ludlow (northern area)
- Listed buildings in Ludlow (southern area)
