= Thomas Taylor Lewis =

English geologist and antiquarian

- Born: 1801; Ludlow, Shropshire
- Died: 28 October 1858 (aged 56–57); Bridstow
- Occupations: Geologist and antiquarian

Thomas Taylor Lewis (1801 – 28 October 1858) was an English geologist and antiquarian.

== Biography ==
Lewis was born at Ludlow in Shropshire in 1801. He was educated at Cheam school, Surrey, under the Rev. James Welchin, was admitted to St. John's College, Cambridge, 5 October 1819, graduated B.A. in 1825, and proceeded M.A. in 1828. In 1826, he became curate of Aymestrey, Herefordshire; he was subsequently vicar of Bridstow, near Ross, and on 17 March 1832 he was appointed in addition perpetual curate of Leinthall Earls, all in the same county. He died at Bridstow on 28 October 1858. Lewis was a diligent local antiquary, and formed large collections of fossils in the neighbourhood of Aymestrey, and especially investigated what was afterwards termed the Silurian system. He communicated the results of his researches to Sir Roderick Murchison [q. v.], and his memory has been preserved in the names of local fossils, such as the ‘Lingula Lewisii,’ ‘Spirorbis Lewisii,’ and ‘Cephalapis Lewisii.’ Lewis also edited for the Camden Society in 1853 the ‘Letters of Lady Brilliana Harley.’
