= Palmer =

Palmer may refer to:

== People and fictional characters ==
- Palmer (pilgrim), a medieval European pilgrim to the Holy Land
- Palmer (given name), including a list of people and fictional characters
- Palmer (surname), including a list of people and fictional characters

== Arts and entertainment ==
- Palmer (film), a 2021 American drama film
- Palmer Museum of Art, the art museum of Pennsylvania State University

== Places ==
- Palmer River (disambiguation)
- Mount Palmer (disambiguation)

=== Antarctica ===
- Palmer Inlet, Palmer Land
- Palmer Land, a portion of the Antarctic Peninsula
- Palmer Archipelago, an island group in the Antarctic Region

=== Australia ===
- Palmer, Queensland, a locality
- Palmer, South Australia, a town
- Palmer, Western Australia, a locality in the Shire of Collie
- Palmer River (Northern Territory), a tributary of the Finke River
- Palmer River, Queensland

=== Canada ===
- Palmer, Ontario, Canada, a community in Burlington
- Palmer, Saskatchewan, an unorganized hamlet
- Palmer Township, Algoma District, Ontario
- Palmer, British Columbia, site of former Fort Victoria (British Columbia)

=== United Kingdom ===
- Palmer Park, Reading, England, a public park

=== United States ===
- Palmer, Alaska, a city
- Palmer, Illinois, a village
- Palmer, Indiana, an unincorporated community
- Palmer, Iowa, a city
- Palmer, Kansas, a city
- Palmer, Massachusetts, a city
  - Palmer (CDP), Massachusetts, a former census-designated place in the town
- Palmer, Michigan, an unincorporated community
- Palmer, Missouri, a ghost town
- Palmer, Nebraska, a village
- Palmer, Tennessee, a town
- Palmer, Texas, a town in Ellis County
- Palmer, Cameron County, Texas, a census-designated place
- Palmer, Washington, an unincorporated community
- Palmer, West Virginia, a ghost town
- Palmer, Wisconsin, an unincorporated community
- Palmer Creek (Turnagain Arm), Alaska
- Palmer Creek (Yamhill River), Oregon
- Palmer Divide, Colorado, a ridge
- Palmer Glacier, Oregon
- Palmer Park (Chicago), Illinois, a public park
- Palmer Park (Detroit), Michigan, a public park
- Palmer Park, Colorado Springs, Colorado, a public park
- Palmer River (Massachusetts – Rhode Island)
- Palmer Township (disambiguation)

== Businesses ==
- C. F. Palmer, Ltd, a British scientific instrument maker
- Château Palmer, a Bordeaux wine producer
- Palmer Bus Service, a bus company in Minnesota and Wisconsin
- Palmer Candy Company, a candy manufacturer in Sioux City, Iowa
- Palmer National Bank of Washington, D.C., from 1983 to 1995
- William Eastman Palmer & Sons, a British partnership of photographers based in Devon

== Schools ==
- Palmer High School (disambiguation)
- Palmer Memorial Institute, Sedalia, North Carolina, a former school for upper class African-Americans
- Palmer College of Chiropractic, Davenport, Iowa
- Palmer's College, Thurrock, Essex, England
- Palmer School, founded 1972, merged with Trinity Episcopal School to form Palmer Trinity School, Palmetto Bay, Florida
- Palmer Theological Seminary, Wynnewood, Pennsylvania
- The Palmer Catholic Academy, a Roman Catholic secondary school in Ilford in London, England

== Sports ==
- Palmer Field, a sports stadium in Middletown, Connecticut
- Palmer Stadium, a former sports stadium of Princeton University, Princeton, New Jersey

== Other uses ==
- USS Palmer, two US Navy vessels
- Palmer (mango), a commercial mango variety originating in south Florida
- Palmer Building, a historic building in Hollywood, California
- Palmer railway station, Victoria, British Columbia, Canada
- Palmer Road (disambiguation)
- Palmer Station, an American research station in Antarctica
- Mejiro Palmer, a Japanese Thoroughbred racehorse

== See also ==
- Palmar (disambiguation)
- Palmer Method, a handwriting system
- Palmer notation, used by dentists
- Palmers (disambiguation)
- Palmier (disambiguation)
