= HBIO =

HBIO may refer to:

- Harvard Bioscience (NASDAQ: HBIO), is an American life science tools company that was founded in 1901 and went public in 2000.
- H-Bio, an oil refinery process
