= Cottonwood, Minnesota bus crash =

Fatal bus collision

Coordinates: 44.586678°N 95.691841°W

Cottonwood bus crash
- Crash site (Minnesota) Crash site (the United States)

Details
- Date: February 19, 2008; 3:25pm (CST)
- Location: Cottonwood, Minnesota
- Country: United States
- Line: School bus
- Operator: Palmer Bus Service
- Owner: Palmer Bus Service
- Incident type: Bus crash
- Cause: A minivan ran a stop sign colliding with a school bus, causing the school bus to roll onto another vehicle.

Statistics
- Bus: 1, 1999 International School Bus
- Vehicles: 1, 1998 Plymouth Voyager minivan; 1, 2007 Chevrolet Silverado pickup truck
- Passengers: 28 passengers, 3 drivers
- Deaths: 4
- Injured: 17

The location of the accident

The Cottonwood bus crash occurred on the afternoon of February 19, 2008 that involved a school bus carrying 28 students from Lakeview Public Schools near Cottonwood in southwestern Minnesota, United States. The bus was struck on its passenger side by a minivan that drove through a stop sign, which caused the bus to fall over onto a pickup truck, killing four students and injuring 17.

The crash gained significant national coverage at the time and further fueled the immigration debate in the United States, due to the minivan driver's illegal immigration status. The driver, Olga Franco del Cid, was later found to have entered the country illegally and using a false name. She was convicted on August 24, 2008 on all 24 counts related to the crash and sentenced to 12 years in prison. After serving eight years of her sentence, she was released and deported from the United States in 2016. In 2019, Franco del Cid was arrested for re-entering the country illegally and sentenced to another two years in prison. She will be deported when her sentence is completed.

This was the deadliest school-bus related crash to occur in the state since 1997, when four students were killed in a crash in Monticello.

== Background ==
Minnesota State Highway 23 is a two-lane state highway that travels through Cottonwood and is considered a main artery throughout southwest Minnesota. The Minnesota Department of Transportation (MnDOT) classifies MN 23 as a high-volume road and about 4,000 vehicles travel between the 15-mile stretch from Cottonwood to Marshall every day.

Lyon County Road 24 is a rural two-lane county highway that travels just outside of Cottonwood and intersects with MN 23 at an at-grade crossing. According to records from MnDOT, there had been no major crashes at that intersection in the decade preceding the crash, only some minor incidents were reported which indicated that the intersection was not a high-risk, high-accident rate intersection.

The Lakeview Public School district includes students living in the communities of Cottonwood and nearby Wood Lake in two separate counties of southwestern Minnesota. The district at the time had approximately 585 students in grades K–12.

== Incident ==
At approximately 3:25 pm local time, a school bus was traveling southbound on Highway 23 carrying 28 students home from school. A Plymouth Voyager minivan, driven by Olga Franco del Cid, was traveling eastbound on County Road 24 at around 50 mph when she drove through a stop sign at the intersection and struck the school bus on its passenger's side. The impact of the crash caused the bus to turn clockwise so it was sitting across Highway 23 when it was struck by a Chevrolet Silverado pickup truck. The pickup truck was driving northbound on Highway 23 and hit the bus on its driver's side which caused the bus to turn counter-clockwise and fall onto the pickup.

According to the Minnesota State Patrol report, the roadway near the accident site is generally flat and the view from the approaches to the intersection on County Road 24 and Highway 23 were clear and unobstructed. The traffic control at this intersection consisted of stop signs on County Road 24 with Highway 23 having the right of way. At the time of the accident, the weather was clear, cold, and partly cloudy with no snow or ice conditions.

As a result of the crash, 17 people were injured, and four were killed. The driver of the pickup only received minor injuries. Several were critically injured and many had to be airlifted to nearby hospitals in Sioux Falls, South Dakota. Two of the students that were killed were brothers, a third student was the daughter of a teacher at Lakeview School, and a fourth was the son of a former teacher.

== Emergency response ==
Emergency services and medical personnel arrived on the scene within minutes of the crash. The first 9-1-1 call came in at 3:33 pm and the Lyon County Sheriff's Office immediately dispatched the Cottonwood Fire and Ambulance services to the crash. At 3:50 pm the first North Memorial Air Care helicopter arrived on scene, and at 3:55 pm North Memorial asked for three additional helicopters to the scene and were en route. Soon after, the Cottonwood EMS was en route to the Avera Marshall Regional Medical Center. One of the first people to arrive on the scene was the off-duty fire chief of nearby Marshall who happened to be traveling in the area.

On that day, 27 different emergency agencies or organizations were part of the rescue efforts including ambulance, state patrol, fire, police, and air care personnel from local and neighboring communities, as well as Minnesota Department of Public Safety and highway patrol staff.

== Legal proceedings ==
On February 22, 2008, the driver of the minivan, Olga Franco del Cid 23-year old from Minneota, was charged under the name 'Alianiss Nunez Morales' with four counts of criminal vehicular homicide; one count of a stop sign violation and one count of not having a Minnesota driver’s license. Agents from Immigration and Customs Enforcement had believed that Franco del Cid was in the country illegally and that the name she gave authorities was not her true identity. Immigration officials went to Puerto Rico to talk to the grandmother of the real Alianiss Morales and showed them pictures of the defendant. The grandmother did not recognize the woman in the pictures.

On February 29, 2008, Franco del Cid was charged with identity theft and false representation of a Social Security number. Investigators had located the true Nunez Morales in Connecticut, who said her purse and identification documents were stolen while she was living in Puerto Rico. It was revealed from state records that a state ID card was issued to a person with the name Alianiss Nunez Morales in February 2006. Three months after it was issued, a woman named with the same name was charged in Chippewa County for driving without a valid driver’s license. She pleaded guilty and was ordered to pay $182 in fines and court fees.

The trial began in late July 2008, after being moved from Marshall to the Kandiyohi County courthouse in Willmar. During the trial, the defense argued that Franco del Cid’s then-boyfriend, Francisco Sangabriel Mendoza, was driving the minivan that hit the school bus, and that the crash threw her toward the driver’s seat. Emergency responders said they found Franco del Cid at the scene behind the steering wheel, her right foot wedged under a crumpled dashboard near the accelerator, which directly contradicted the defense that her boyfriend was driving.

On August 24, 2008, Franco del Cid was convicted of four counts of criminal vehicular homicide, 17 counts of criminal vehicular operation, providing a false name and birth date to a police office, failing to stop at a stop sign, and driving without a valid driver's license. On October 8, 2008, she was sentenced to 12 and a half years in prison. Franco del Cid's attorney appealed her conviction but it was upheld by the Minnesota Court of Appeals on July 20, 2010. After serving eight years of her prison sentence, she was released from the Minnesota Correctional Facility in Shakopee on April 26, 2016 and was deported from the United States the following month, according to an ICE spokesperson.

Three years after her deportation, she was arrested again at her home in Inver Grove Heights on November 29, 2019 after ICE officials acted on an anonymous tip that she re-entered the country illegally. Franco del Cid was then charged on December 13, 2019 with illegal reentry after removal, identification document fraud and false representation of Social Security number. She pleaded guilty to the charges and was sentenced to another two years in prison on June 11, 2020.

== Aftermath ==
Classes were cancelled at Lakeview Public Schools the day after the crash and resumed later in the week with extra support staff and grief counselors available for students and staff. Several funerals and memorials were held in the community including a memorial service at the Lakeview High School gymnasium where over a thousand people gathered to remember the four students killed. The families of the victims were instrumental in getting a memorial garden started on the school grounds in the years after the crash. Most noticeable in the garden is a large red heart with the names of the four children who died on one side and the names of the 24 students who survived along with the bus driver on the other side. Members of the Cottonwood Fire Department also raised money for the installation of stop signs with flashing lights at rural intersections near Cottonwood.
