= Palmers =

Palmers may refer to:

- Palmers, Minnesota, United States, an unincorporated community
- Palmers College, a sixth form college located on the outskirts of Grays, Thurrock
- Palmers Shipbuilding and Iron Company, a British shipbuilding company established in 1852
- Palmers Garden Centre, New Zealand garden retail chain
- Palmers Textil AG, Austria's largest textile producer
- Palmers' Guild, a major religious guild based in Ludlow

== See also ==
- Palmer's College, Thurrock, Essex, England
- Palmer (disambiguation)
