= Ludlow Guildhall =

Municipal building in Ludlow, Shropshire, England

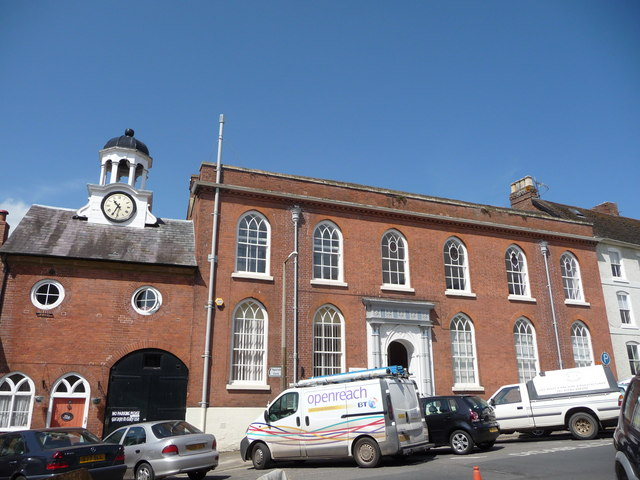
- The building in 2009

- Shown in Shropshire
- 52.3665°N 2.7210°W
- Location: Mill Street, Ludlow

History
- Built: 1411

Site notes
- Architect: Thomas Farnolls Pritchard (Remodelling of 1768)
- Architectural style: Gothic Revival style

Listed Building – Grade I
- Official name: The Guildhall and adjoining coach house
- Designated: 15 April 1954
- Reference no.: 1211188

Ludlow Guildhall is a historic building in Mill Street in Ludlow, a town in Shropshire, in England. The building, which accommodates the offices and meeting place of Ludlow Town Council, is a Grade I listed building.

== History ==
The building was commissioned by the Palmers' Guild as their meeting hall and was completed in around 1411. Following the Dissolution of the Guilds in 1547, the building was converted for use as a courthouse. In 1768, the building was extensively altered to a design by Thomas Farnolls Pritchard, with the structure being encased in brick, and a second storey added. A panelled courtroom survives from this period. The guildhall also served as the meeting place for the bailiffs and other feudal leaders of the borough.

Following the implementation of the Municipal Corporations Act 1835, which introduced elected councils, the guildhall became the meeting place of the newly-elected borough council. However, in the 1880s, they decided to commission a more substantial building. The site they selected for the new town hall was in the Castle Square. It was designed by Henry Cheers in the Edwardian Baroque style, built in red brick with stone dressings and completed in 1888. However, in 1967, the town hall ceased to be the local seat of government, when the area was subsumed within Ludlow Rural District, the headquarters of which was at Stone House in Corve Street. The town hall subsequently became dilapidated and it was demolished in March 1986. Ludlow Town Council, which was formed as a result of local government reorganisation in 1974, was initially based at the town hall but, following the demolition of that building, it relocated to the Buttercross in the High Street.

Meanwhile, the guildhall continued to serve as Ludlow Magistrates' Court until the courts service moved out in September 2011. Ludlow Town Council then relocated from the Buttercross to the vacant guildhall in August 2012, allowing the Buttercross to become an "interpretation centre" for the town's architectural heritage. An extensive programme of refurbishment works, including repairs to the windows and plaster work, was completed at the guildhall at a cost of £107,000 in 2018.

== Architecture ==
The building is constructed of brick on a stone plinth, with a timber frame, and a slate roof. The design involves an asymmetrical main frontage of six bays facing onto Mill Street. The entrance is on the centre left, and is formed by a pair of Doric order columns supporting an entablature with triglyphs: it is described by the architectural historian, Nikolaus Pevsner, as "exceedingly pretty". The other bays on the ground floor and all the bays on the first floor are fenestrated by windows with Gothic pointed heads. Inside, the original queen post roof survives. To the left of the building is a two-storey coach house, with an ornate wooden cupola, originally associated with Dinham Hall, and later with the guildhall, but now a private house. The guildhall was grade I listed in 1954.

== See also ==
- Grade I listed buildings in Shropshire
- Listed buildings in Ludlow (southern area)
