= Thomas Farnolls Pritchard =

English architect (1723-1777)

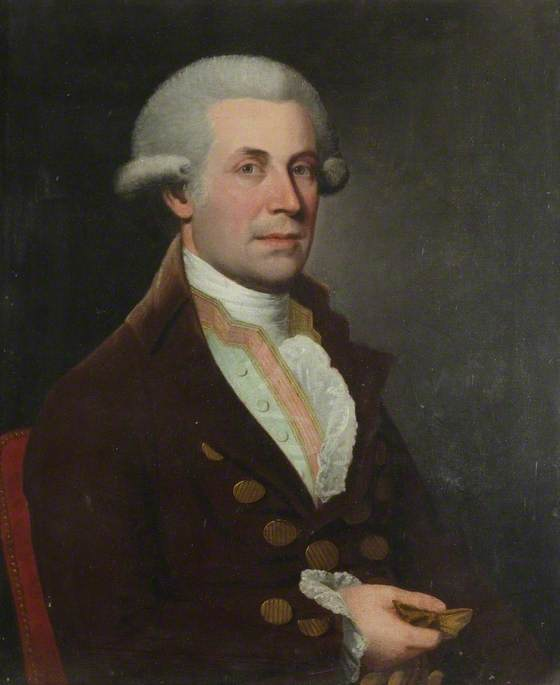
- Born: Thomas Farnolls Pritchard; May 1723; Shrewsbury, Shropshire, England
- Died: 23 December 1777 (aged 54)
- Known for: designing the Iron Bridge
- Spouse: Elinor Russell
- Children: 3

Thomas Farnolls Pritchard (also known as Farnolls Pritchard; baptised 11 May 1723 – 23 December 1777) was an English architect and interior decorator who is best remembered for his design of the first cast-iron bridge in the world.

== Biography ==
Pritchard was born in Shrewsbury, Shropshire, and baptised in St Julian's Church, Shrewsbury on 11 May 1723. His father was a joiner. Thomas also trained as a joiner, but then developed a professional practice as an architect and interior designer. He specialised in the design of chimney-pieces and other items of interior decoration, and in funerary monuments.

Pritchard worked closely with other local architects and craftsmen. William Baker of Audlem, an architect and contractor, used his plans to construct St John's Church, Wolverhampton. Joseph Bromfield, who worked for Pritchard initially as a plasterer, but became a very competent draughtsman and architect, appears to have taken over a large portion of Pritchard's architectural practice after Pritchard's death. Pritchard's houses and churches have been described as "no more than pleasant provincial work". Such work includes the rebuilding of St Julian's Church, Shrewsbury, and Hatton Grange, Shropshire.

Examples of Pritchard's interior decoration include Croft Castle, Gaines in Whitbourne, Herefordshire, Shipton Hall, Shropshire, the ballroom at Powis Castle, and chimney-pieces at Broseley Hall, The Lawns, Broseley, and Benthall Hall. He also designed the rococo drawing room at Tatton Hall, Cheshire.

In the design of funerary monuments he employed coloured marbles, characterised by Rupert Gunnis as "school of Henry Cheere". These were usually in rococo or Gothic style, and later in neoclassical style. They include monuments to Ann Wilkinson, 1756, at Wrexham, Denbighshire; the Rev. John Lloyd, 1758, and Mary Morhall, 1765, both at St. Mary's Shrewsbury; and Richard Corbet, at Moreton Corbet, Shropshire. Pritchard's monuments can be found in churches across Shropshire, including also churches at Acton Round, Ludford and Barrow.

Pritchard designed the Shrewsbury foundling hospital (an offshoot of that in London), built in 1760, later a workhouse and in 1882 adapted as the present campus premises for Shrewsbury School. Pritchard carried out work in Ludlow, including rebuilding its jail and the Hosier's Almshouses, and making alterations to the Guildhall.

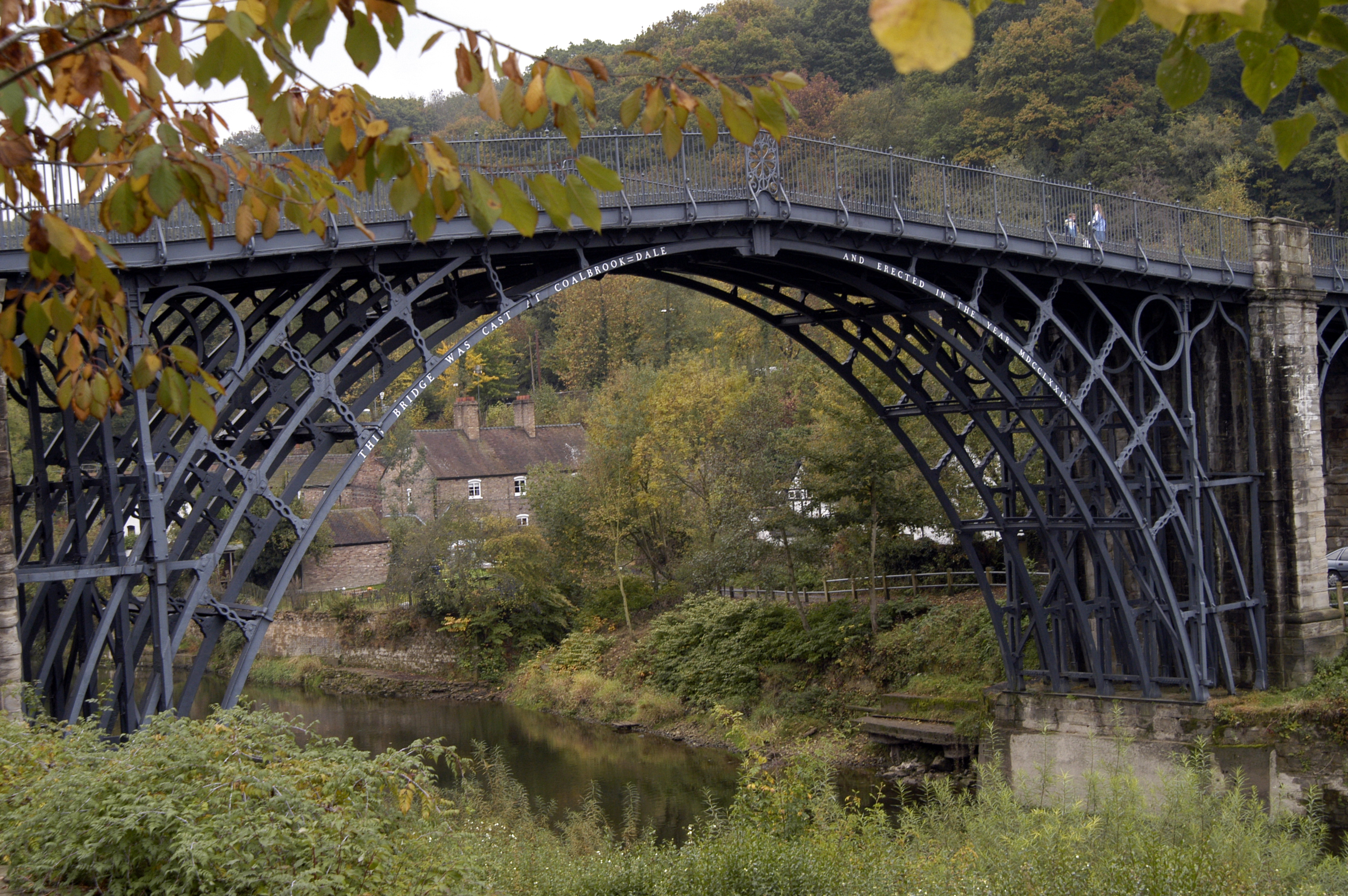
The Iron Bridge designed by Pritchard and made by Abraham Darby's Coalbrookdale works

In 1769, he left Shrewsbury and moved to Eyton on Severn where he took up farming as well as continuing with his architectural work. He made various designs for bridges, none of which came to fruition, until he made plans for a bridge in cast iron to cross the River Severn in Coalbrookdale, Shropshire, adapting the principles of timber bridge-building. A modified version of his design was cast at the ironworks in Coalbrookdale in 1777–79.

== Death ==
Pritchard died, aged 54, before the bridge was completed, but his design of The Iron Bridge led to the building of the first cast-iron arch bridge in the world.

He was buried in St Julian's, Shrewsbury, where his memorial also commemorates his wife, Elinor Russell, of Shrewsbury (married 1751, died 1768) and three children who died young.
