= Harvard Apparatus =

American laboratory equipment manufacturer

- Founded: Cambridge, Massachusetts (January 1, 1901)
- Headquarters: Holliston, Massachusetts
- Area served: Worldwide
- Number of employees: 69 (2023)
- Parent: Harvard Bioscience
- Website: www.harvardapparatus.com

Harvard Apparatus is a major US manufacturer of specialized physiological research laboratory equipment with current headquarters in Holliston, Massachusetts.

== History ==
Harvard Apparatus was founded in 1901 by William Townsend Porter, a physiologist at Harvard Medical School. Frustrated by the lack of high quality and cost-effective equipment then available, Porter began manufacturing physiology teaching equipment in a machine shop that he created on the medical school campus. This shop supplied equipment to Harvard Medical School and provided surplus equipment to other schools. Charles W. Eliot, the president of Harvard University, although supportive of Porter's work and mission, was concerned that Porter's enterprise would be viewed as a commercial venture operating on nontaxed property. So, in 1901 Eliot secured capital for Porter to found the Harvard Apparatus Company, which was moved off the Harvard campus to a converted barn in Dover, Massachusetts.

== Invention ==
The company invented the mechanical syringe pump in the 1950s, and introduced the first microprocessor controlled syringe pumps in the 1980s. Harvard Apparatus also developed first volume controlled- and then pressure controlled ventilators, pulsatile blood pumps, transducers, amplifiers, recorders, glassware and many other specialized bioscience research products.

== Operation ==
Harvard Apparatus is now part of the Harvard Bioscience Inc. family of companies. Harvard Bioscience (Nasdaq: HBIO) is a global developer, manufacturer and marketer of scientific instruments. Its products are sold to thousands of researchers in over 100 countries; the company has offices in the United States, the United Kingdom, Germany, Spain, Sweden, and China.

== See also ==
- C. F. Palmer, Ltd
- Paolo Macchiarini
