= William Townsend Porter =

Physician, physiologist, and medical educator

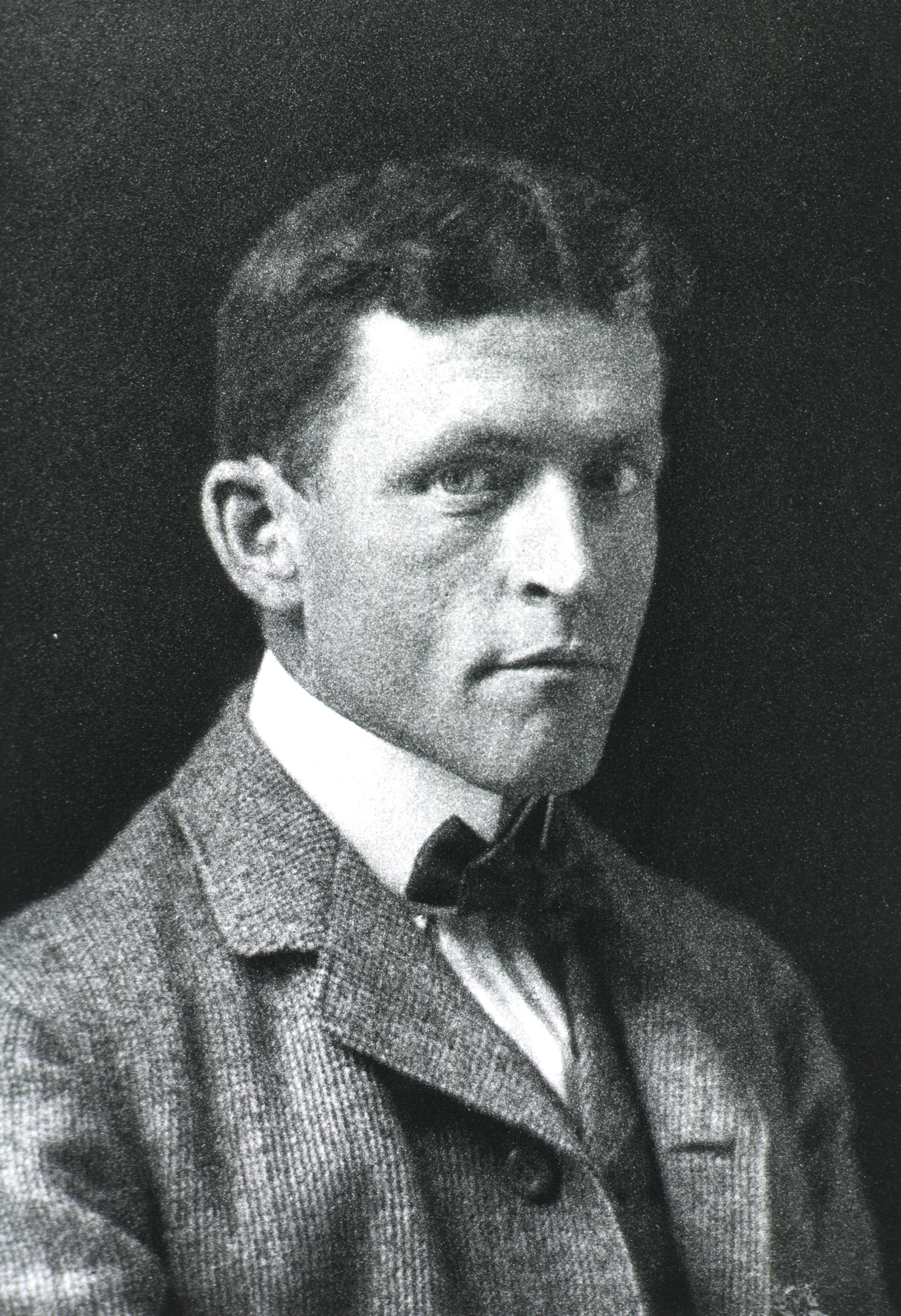
- Born: September 24, 1862; Plymouth, Ohio, US
- Died: February 12, 1949 (aged 86); Framingham, Massachusetts, US
- Resting place: Dover, Massachusetts
- Spouse: Alma Canfield Sterling
- Children: 1
- Scientific career
- Fields: Physiology
- Institutions: Harvard Medical School

William Townsend Porter (September 24, 1862 – February 12, 1949) was an American physician, physiologist, and medical educator who spent most of his career at Harvard Medical School. He founded the Harvard Apparatus company, which produced laboratory equipment for teaching and research in physiology, and was the founding editor of the American Journal of Physiology.

== Early life and education ==
Porter was born on September 24, 1862, in Plymouth, Ohio. His father was also a physician. He attended the St. Louis Medical College (now the Washington University School of Medicine) and received his M.D. in 1885. He then studied physiological chemistry briefly in Philadelphia before traveling to Germany for further study with Walther Flemming, Martin Heidenhain, and Karl Hürthle. This exposure to the German style of practical, experimental work in the then-emerging field of physiology would shape his future career as an educator.

== Medical and academic career ==
On returning to the United States, Porter became a resident physician at the St. Louis Medical College. In 1887 he became a professor at the school and began teaching physiology, and is believed to have established the first physiology laboratory west of the Mississippi River. He published several papers on physiology while at St. Louis and was elected to the American Physiological Society at the society's fourth meeting in 1891.

Henry Pickering Bowditch, one of the founders of APS and a professor at Harvard Medical School, recruited Porter to Harvard in 1893 to develop the school's educational program in physiology, then based heavily on demonstration. Porter's experiences in Germany led him to promote practical experimental work for students. To manufacture the necessary laboratory equipment, he set up a machine shop at Harvard. In 1901, then-president Charles W. Eliot financed Porter's founding of the Harvard Apparatus Company to sell the improved equipment. The company was converted to a non-profit organization in 1934 and its financial surplus was used to found a fellowship at Harvard in Porter's name.

Porter hired former student Walter Bradford Cannon to assist in teaching physiology; eventually Porter's high standards and high failure rates for students in his courses led to a dispute that ended in Cannon being given Bowditch's former chair and Porter being moved to a professorship of comparative physiology, with which he was disappointed. The result was a years-long "breach" between the two; however, Cannon supported numerous honors for Porter from the APS, including the honorary presidency at the society's 50th-anniversary celebration in 1937.

Porter retired from Harvard, assuming professor emeritus status, in 1928 but remained active in APS activities and with the Harvard Apparatus company. He was given the distinction of an honorary membership in the APS in 1948, the only American to receive one. His research is recognized as foundational to modern understanding of coronary artery disease.

== American Journal of Physiology ==
The American Journal of Physiology was first proposed among prominent American physiologists in 1894, and the proposal was renewed in 1897, with the membership of the APS supporting the idea. Porter became the founding editor of the new journal, which released its first issue in 1898; he would continue in this role until 1914. The journal was primarily financed by Porter personally, with support from the APS; when Porter formally transferred it to the APS in 1914, the APS became one of the first American scientific societies to publish its own journal.

== Personal life ==
Porter married his wife Alma Canfield Sterling in 1893 and the couple had one child. In addition to his teaching duties, Porter occasionally wrote for the general public, as in his series of dispatches on combat trauma among soldiers in World War I, published in the Atlantic Monthly and later compiled as Shock at the Front.

Porter died of bronchopneumonia on February 16, 1949. After Porter's death, Harvard colleague A. Clifford Barger remembered him with the description: "Physiology was Porter's religion; he had no other." Porter's papers are held by the Harvard Medical Library.
