= Palmer River (disambiguation) =

Palmer River may refer to:

- Palmer River (Massachusetts – Rhode Island), in the United States
- Palmer River (Northern Territory), Australia, a tributary of the Finke River
- Palmer River (Queensland), in Australia
- Palmer River (Bécancour River tributary), a tributary of Bécancour River, in Chaudières-Appalaches, Quebec, Canada
- Palmer River (Labrador), a river flowing through the Torngat Mountains into Nachvak fjord

== See also ==
- Palmer (disambiguation)
