= Listed buildings in Ludlow (southern area) =

Ludlow is a civil parish in Shropshire, England. It contains over 420 listed buildings that are recorded in the National Heritage List for England. Of these, nine are listed at Grade I, the highest of the three grades, 25 are at Grade II*, the middle grade, and the others are at Grade II, the lowest grade. Most of the listed buildings are grouped around the centre of the town, from a line stretching from Castle Square, along High Street and King Street to Tower Street, and southwards to the River Teme, and to the north along Bull Ring and Corve Street.

The listed buildings reflect the history of the town from the medieval period to the present. The oldest significant buildings are the remains of Ludlow Castle, Broad Gate, a former gateway to the town, St Laurence's Church, and surviving sections of the Town Walls. Most of the listed buildings are houses, cottages, shops, public buildings, hotels and public houses, the earlier ones timber framed, or basically timber framed and later refronted or encased in brick. During the 18th century larger and grander houses were built, most of them in brick. Other listed buildings include weirs, bridges, workshops, almshouses, two gazebos, a well head, two former toll houses, a former paper mill, a hospital, banks, a drinking fountain, and two telephone kiosks.

This list contains the listed buildings in the southern area of the town, south of a line stretching from Castle Square at the west, along Market Street, Street, King Street and Tower Street at the east. The listed buildings in the northern area can be found at Listed buildings in Ludlow (northern area).

== Key ==
Grade	Criteria
I	Buildings of exceptional interest, sometimes considered to be internationally important
II*	Particularly important buildings of more than special interest
II	Buildings of national importance and special interest

== Buildings ==
Name and location	Photograph	Date	Notes	Grade
69 Old Street; 52.36690°N 2.71566°W	—	12th century	The tower of the former town wall converted into a house, and extended. It is in stone, and has a pyramidal tile roof. There are three storeys, one bay, and later extensions on each side. The windows are casements.	II*
Chapel House; 52.36588°N 2.72277°W		1177–89	Originally the Chapel of St Thomas the Martyr, it was incorporated into a house in the 18th century. It has a tile roof and two storeys, and is in two parts. The right part is in stone and contains blind arches. In the right return is an archway with an arched window above, all with hood moulds. The left part has a ground floor in stone, and the upper storey is in brick with modillion eaves. It contains a doorway with a fanlight and a flat hood, and casement windows. On the roof is a lantern with a wrought iron weathervane.	II*
Broad Gate, Broad Gate House and railings 52.3653°N 2.7179°W		13th century	Originally the gatehouse in the town walls, between the 16th and 18th centuries it was extended and converted for domestic occupation. The gateway is a sandstone arch, with a portcullis slot, blocked arrow slits, and twin drum towers. The north front is in roughcast stone, and has an embattled parapet and a tile roof. There are two storeys above the archway and five sash windows in each floor, with a gable containing a lead panel above the middle three windows. Steps lead up to the entrance in the left return, which has a doorway that has pilasters with clustered shafts, a moulded surround, and a decorative hood. To the left is a recessed two-storey two-bay wing containing sash windows with stuccoed keyblocks. Between the entrance and the roadway are iron railings.	I
Town Walls from Dinham Gate northwards 52.36625°N 2.72370°W		13th century	The walls are in stone on bedrock, and have been much restored. They are between about 4 metres (13 ft) and 8 metres (26 ft) high.	II
Town Walls from Dinham Gate southeastwards 52.36508°N 2.72228°W	—	13th century	The walls are in stone and stretch for about 200 metres (660 ft). They are between about 2 metres (6 ft 7 in) and 4 metres (13 ft) high.	II
Town Walls from the Galdeford Gate southwards 52.36802°N 2.71642°W	—	13th century	The walls are in stone with some brickwork, and stretch to the south for about 50 metres (160 ft).	II
Town Walls from Mill Street Gate eastwards 52.36496°N 2.71943°W	—	13th century	The walls are in stone on bedrock, and have some brick in the superstructure and some brick repairs. They are between about 3 metres (9.8 ft) and 6 metres (20 ft) high.	II
Town Walls from Mill Street Gate westwards 52.36479°N 2.72087°W		13th century	The walls are in stone on bedrock, and extend for about 100 metres (330 ft). They are between about 3 metres (9.8 ft) and 5 metres (16 ft) high, and at the western end is a D-shaped bastion.	II
Town Walls from Old Gate House westwards 52.36574°N 2.71683°W		13th century	The walls are in stone on bedrock, and have some brick in the superstructure and pilasters. They are between about 5 metres (16 ft) and 8 metres (26 ft) high. They contain three brick-vaulted openings, and incorporate a summer house.	II
Town Walls from Walters Clothing Factory southwards 52.36768°N 2.71620°W	—	13th century	The walls are in stone and brickwork, and extend southwards to the rear of No. 75 Old Street.	II
Ludford Mill Weir; 52.36389°N 2.71597°W		Medieval	The weir is in the River Teme and serves Ludford Mill. It is in stone and has a parabolic shape.	II
Weir near Lower Mill Street; 52.36370°N 2.72114°W		Medieval (probable)	The weir is in the River Teme, and stretches from the bottom of Lower Mill Street in a south-western direction. It is in stone, with some repairs in concrete, and is about 80 metres (260 ft) long.	II
Ludlow College Complex; 52.36544°N 2.72018°W		Late 14th century	The original part was built as a house, and later became a grammar school. It is roughcast with a tile roof, and has one storey and an attic. It contains a doorway with a moulded four-centred arch and jambs, three two-light mullioned windows with trefoil heads and lattice glazing, and five tile-hung gabled dormers. To the left and dating from the late 18th to the early 19th century is a brick extension, originally Palmer's Hall, with a tile roof on which is an ornate timber clock and bell tower with a weathervane. This part has two storeys, and contains a doorway with fluted pilasters, a moulded surround and a fanlight, and a moulded flat hood. To its left are two sash windows under segmental arches, and to its right are two mullioned and transomed windows under segmental arches.	II*
The Guildhall and coach house 52.36646°N 2.72088°W		c. 1414	A timber framed building that was remodelled and encased in brick in 1768–76. It has a stone plinth, a moulded and modillioned cornice, a coped parapet, and a tile roof. There are two storeys and six bays. Steps lead up to a round-headed doorway that has banded, clustered-shaft pilasters, an enriched frieze, and a moulded flat hood. The windows are sashes with pointed heads and Gothick glazing. The coach house to the left has two storeys and two bays, and a Welsh slate roof. In the ground floor is a window and a doorway, both with pointed heads and Gothick glazing, and a carriage entrance. In the upper floor are two circular windows, and on the roof is a wooden cupola.	I
10 Broad Street and Angel Hotel Annex; 52.36724°N 2.71846°W		1431–39	The oldest part is the rear range, the block facing the street dating from the 17th century and refronted in the 18th century. The building is basically timber framed, the front being partly in stucco and plaster, and partly rendered. It is in two parts, the left part has two storeys and an attic, and the right part has three storeys. Both have 20th-century shop fronts under a deep overhang on cast iron pillars. The upper floor of the left part contains a canted bay window, and above are two gabled dormers. The right part contains mullioned and transomed windows with casements.	II
32 Broad Street; 52.36562°N 2.71796°W	—	15th century	The main part of the house dates from the late 18th century and it has an earlier core. It is in brick with a Welsh slate roof. There are three storeys and a cellar, three bays, and a rear wing. The doorway to the right has banded pilasters, and an entablature. The windows are sashes with grooved stuccoed lintels. In the rear wing is a sliding sash window.	II
40 Broad Street; 52.36598°N 2.71849°W		15th century	The oldest part is the rear range. The front block dates from the 18th century, and is in brick with storey bands, a stone coped parapet, and a tile roof. There are three storeys and a cellar, a front of four bays, and a rear range. Steps with wrought iron handrails lead up to the round-headed doorway that has an ornamental fanlight, and a moulded flat hood on fluted consoles, and the windows are sashes.	II
53 Broad Street; 52.36598°N 2.71849°W		15th century	The oldest part is the rear range, the front block dating from the 17th century. The house is timber framed with plaster infill on a brick plinth, and has a Welsh slate roof. There are three storeys, three bays, and a rear range. Each floor is jettied and has a moulded bressumer on decorative consoles. In the centre is a plank door, and the windows are mullioned and transomed and contain casements.	II
Ludford Bridge; 52.36376°N 2.71723°W		15th century	The bridge, which was restored in 1886. carries the B4361 road over the River Teme. It is in stone, and consists of three arches with cutwaters that rise to form refuges. The bridge has a stone band on the east side and ashlar coping. The bridge is also a Scheduled Monument.	I
Lane's House and Oldgate House; 52.36634°N 2.71590°W		Early 16th century	The older is Oldgate House, with Lane's House dating from the 17th century on a 16th-century core. Lane's House faces the street, the lower parts are in stone and brick, the upper parts are timber framed with plaster infill, and the roof is tiled. There are three storeys and a cellar and two bays. In the ground floor is a round-headed doorway on the left, a small window and a mullioned and transomed window to the right. In the middle floor are two mullioned and transomed windows on decorative consoles, the left with a pediment. In the top floor are two gables, each with a casement window. Oldgate House is at right angles on the left, with a timber-framed gable facing the street. It is in stone with two storeys and four bays, casement windows, and three hipped dormers.	II*
5 Old Street; 52.36790°N 2.71710°W	—	16th century	A house, later a shop, with a timber framed core that was refronted in the 18th century. It has a slate roof, three storeys and a cellar, and three bays. In the ground floor is a 19th-century shop front, with a doorway to right, to the left are quoins, and over all is a fascia hood on scrolled and fluted consoles. In the upper floors are sash windows in moulded surrounds under segmental arches.	II
House on corner of Bell Lane and Lower Raven Lane; 52.36607°N 2.71954°W	—	16th century	The house is timber framed with a tile roof, and has two storeys and a single bay. The windows are sashes, and there is a bressumer on consoles.	II
St John's House; 52.36414°N 2.71712°W		16th century	A house incorporating parts of the chapel of St John's Hospital, including a 13th-century arch, and built in stone. The left part is gabled with three storeys, a roof in Welsh slate, the chapel arch infilled with brick, and casement windows. To the right are two lower ranges with one storey and attics, and a tile roof. They include windows of varying types, including cross-windows, a mullioned and transomed window, sash windows, casement windows, and two timber framed gabled dormers.	II*
47, 48 and 49 Mill Street; 52.36627°N 2.72085°W		Late 16th century	A pair of timber framed cottages with weatherboarding, and a Welsh slate roof with some tiles. There are two storeys, the upper floor jettied. In the ground floor are four doorways, a shop front, and a canted bay window, and in the upper floor are casement windows.	II
9, 10 and 11 Raven Lane; 52.36635°N 2.71961°W		16th to 17th century	A timber framed house with a roof partly of Welsh slate and partly of tiles. There are three storeys and a cellar, and two gabled bays. Each upper floor is jettied with figurehead consoles. Some windows are sashes, and others are casements.	II
Wall south of Dinham Lodge; 52.36583°N 2.72352°W	—	16th to 17th century (probable)	The wall to the south of the house is in stone with pilasters and has some brick superstructure with stone coping. It is over 6 feet (1.8 m) high, and links to the Town Walls.	II
Town Preacher's House (14 Old Street); 52.36743°N 2.71700°W		1611	The house is timber framed with plaster infill and a tile roof. There are three storeys and a cellar, and four bays. The second and fourth bays are gabled and contain full-height canted bay windows. The upper storeys are jettied with moulded bressumers on decorative consoles. In the first bay is a plank door to a passage, and in the third bay is a doorway with a beaded surround, a fanlight, and a moulded hood on consoles.	II
2 and 2A Broad Street; 52.36764°N 2.71884°W		Early 17th century	A shop with living accommodation, it was restored in the 19th and 20th centuries. It is timber framed with plaster and rendered infill, and a tile roof with twin gables at the front. There are three storeys and two bays. Both upper floors are jettied with carved bressumers on figurehead consoles. In the ground floor is a 20th-century shop front, the middle floor contains oriel windows with decorative consoles and underhangs, in the top floor are mullioned windows, and the gables have ornate pierced bargeboards.	II
3 and 4 Broad Street; 52.36756°N 2.71883°W		Early 17th century	A shop with living accommodation, it is timber framed with rendered infill and a tile roof. There are three storeys, two bays, and a wing at the rear right. In the ground floor is a recessed shop front with a paired entrance under a boarded bressumer on cast iron pillars. The middle floor contains mullioned and transomed oriel windows. The top floor is jettied, and contains two-light mullioned windows.	II
5 and 6 Broad Street; 52.36749°N 2.71878°W		Early 17th century	A shop with living accommodation, later a café, it is timber framed with plaster infill and has a tile roof. There are three storeys and three bays. To the left is a passageway, and the ground floor contains 19th-century shop fronts, all under a deep overhang on cast iron columns. In the middle and right bays of the middle floor are canted bay windows, and the other windows are sashes. At the rear are two- and three-storey ranges and a cross-wing.	II
7 Broad Street; 52.36741°N 2.71870°W		Early 17th century	A shop with living accommodation, it is timber framed with plaster infill, and has a hipped slate roof. There are three storeys and a cellar, and two bays. In the ground floor is a shop front under a deep overhang on cast iron columns. In the middle storey is a canted oriel window with a coved underhang, and in the top floor are two sash windows.	II
13 Dinham; 52.36636°N 2.72225°W		Early 17th century	The house is in brick in the ground floor and timber framed with plaster infill above, and has a tile roof with a gable facing the street. There are two storeys and an attic, and one bay. The doorway has moulded pilasters and a moulded flat hood. The upper storeys and gable are jettied, the gable having a bressumer in decorative consoles. The windows are casements in moulded surrounds, and the gable has ornamental bargeboards.	II
14 Dinham; 52.36633°N 2.72234°W		Early 17th century	The house is in brick in the ground floor and timber framed with plaster infill above, with moulded eaves, and a tile roof that has two gables with pierced bargeboards. There are three storeys, the top storey jettied, and two bays. The doorway has moulded pilasters and a moulded flat hood, it is flanked by millioned and transomed windows, and the other windows are casements.	II
14 and 15 Raven Lane; 52.36657°N 2.71968°W	—	Early 17th century	A pair of timber framed houses with plaster infill, and a tile roof with twin gables facing the street. There are three storeys and cellars, each house has one bay, and there is a two-storey rear wing. The doors are paired in the centre; the left door has a moulded architrave, and the right door has pilasters, a fanlight, and a plain hood on moulded consoles. To the left is a canted bay window, and to the right is a sash window in a moulded architrave. Both upper floors are jettied, above the ground floor is a bressumer, and the consoles have carved decoration.	II
Angel Hotel; 52.36728°N 2.71866°W		Early 17th century	The hotel is timber framed with plaster infill, modillioned eaves, a slate roof, three storeys, and rear wings. The ground floor contains a doorway, three sash windows, and a passageway on the right. The middle floor overhangs and is supported by four cast iron posts. In the middle floor are two bowed oriel windows, and in the top floor are two mullioned and transomed windows with moulded surrounds containing casements. The rear wing has a jettied top floor and contains sash windows, and a further wing of two storeys and an attic has casement windows.	II
13 Broad Street; 52.36711°N 2.7186°W		Early to mid-17th century	A shop with living accommodation, it is timber framed with plaster infill and has a tile roof. There are three storeys and an attic, and one bay. In the ground floor is a late 19th-century shop front, recessed under an overhang on cast iron columns, and to the left is a passage leading to a doorway with a chamfered stuccoed architrave. The middle and top floors are jettied with moulded bressumers on decorative consoles. They contain mullioned and transomed windows with casements. The attic is gabled with decorative bargeboards and a pendant, and it contains a blocked window.	II
7 Brand Lane; 52.36639°N 2.71778°W	—	17th century	The house is rendered on stone and brick, and has a storey band and a gabled Welsh slate roof. There are two storeys and one bay. The doorway has a beaded surround, and the windows are casements.	II
8 Brand Lane; 52.36638°N 2.71787°W	—	17th century	The house is in rendered brick and has a tile roof with the gable facing the street. There are two storeys and two bays. In the centre is a doorway with a blocked opening above, and the windows are casements. All the openings have cambered heads.	II
12 Brand Lane; 52.36650°N 2.71767°W		17th century	The house, which was restored in the 20th century, has a timber framed core, the ground floor is stuccoed, the upper floors are jettied and roughcast, and it has a slate roof. There are three storeys and a cellar, and two bays. The doorway has a beaded surround, and the windows are sashes.	II
13 Brand Lane; 52.36652°N 2.71756°W		17th century	The house, which was restored in the 20th century, is in rendered timber framing and has a slate roof. There are three storeys and a cellar, three bays, and a two-storey rear wing with a tile roof. In the left bay is a doorway with a chamfered architrave, to the right is a mullioned and transomed window and a garage door, all under a jettied first floor on reeded brackets and pilasters. In the upper floors are sash windows in moulded surrounds.	II
33 Broad Street; 52.36550°N 2.71789°W		17th century	The house was refronted in the late 19th century. It is in roughcast brick on timber framing and has a tile roof. There are two storeys and a cellar, and a front of five bays. Above the left two bays is a jettied gable, to the right is a narrow recessed bay, and to the right of this are two gabled bays. The doorway in the recessed bay has moulded pilasters, and a moulded hood on fluted consoles. To its right is a canted bay window, and further to the right is a plate glass window. The other windows are sashes in moulded architraves with corbelled sills. Inside there is exposed timber framing.	II
68 and 69 Broad Street; 52.36743°N 2.71903°W		17th century	Houses, later a shop, it is basically timber framed and was refronted in the 18th century. The older part is the right return, which has a tile roof, three storeys and an attic. The ground floor is stuccoed, and the upper parts have exposed timber framing. The upper floors are jettied and the windows are casements. The front has a slate roof, a moulded cornice, and a deep modillioned cornice. There are three storeys and five bays, a shop front in the ground floor, and sash windows above.	II
20 and 21 Dinham; 52.36594°N 2.72256°W	—	Mid-17th century	A house, extended in the 18th and 20th centuries, and divided into two houses. The original part is timber framed with plaster infill and a Welsh slate roof. It has one storey and an attic, and has a box dormer. The extension to the left is in brick with three storeys and two bays, and contains casement windows in moulded architraves. At the rear is exposed timber framing and a mullioned window.	II
Lower Broad Street; 52.36475°N 2.71743°W	—	17th century	A house, at one time an inn, it was altered in the 18th and 19th centuries. It is in brick, with stone at the rear, and has a Welsh slate roof. There are three storeys and a cellar, and a front of three bays. The central doorway has a flat head on consoles, above it is a blocked window, it is flanked by bay windows with arched-headed lights, and in the upper floors are casement windows. At the rear are wings of two and three storeys, part of the roof is tiled, and they are partly pebbledashed.	II
18, 19 and 20 Lower Broad Street; 52.36472°N 2.71740°W	—	17th century (probable)	The cottages were refronted and altered in the 19th century. They are in brick with a tile roof, and have two storeys and a front of two bays. There is a central doorway, and the windows are casements.	II
23 Lower Broad Street and cottage 52.36457°N 2.71733°W	—	17th century	A house with a cottage at the rear, at one time an inn, the oldest part is the cottage, with the house added in the 18th century, and altered in the 20th century. The house is in brick with stone at the rear and has a tile roof. There are two storeys and an attic, an L-shaped plan with a front of three bays, and a rear wing. In the centre is a doorway flanked by canted bay windows, all under a pentice roof, and there is a passageway door to the right. Above are casement windows and two gabled dormers. At the rear, the cottage is partly timber framed, and has 20th-century doors and windows, and one earlier mullioned window.	II
35 and 36 Lower Broad Street; 52.36430°N 2.71756°W	—	17th century	A pair of stone houses with a tile roof, two storeys and two gabled rear wings. The doorways, towards the centre, have flat hoods on consoles, and the windows are casements.	II
40–43 Lower Broad Street; 52.36443°N 2.7176°W	—	17th century (probable)	A stone house with a rendered upper floor and a tile roof. It has two storeys and an attic, two bays, and twin gabled rear wings. The central doorway has a hood with an oak frame, and to the right is a canted bay window. The other windows are casements, and there are two gabled dormers.	II
70 and 71 Lower Broad Street; 52.36490°N 2.71794°W		17th century (probable)	Two timber framed houses with tile roofs, with No. 71 at the front and No. 70 behind. No. 71 has a stuccoed front, two storeys and an attic, and two bays. In the ground floor is a doorway with a canted bay window to the right. The upper floor is jettied with a bressumer and a moulded cornice, and above are sash windows and a gabled dormer. In the passage to the right is exposed timber framing in the upper storey, and stone below.	II
12 Mill Street; 52.36595°N 2.72034°W		17th century	The house was extended to the right in the 18th century. The original part is timber framed with plaster infill and some rendering, the later part is in stone, and it has a Welsh slate roof. There is a tripartite window in the ground floor of both parts, the left part has a gabled dormer and the right part has a casement window in the upper floor. To the right is a protruding two-storey rendered porch with a curved corner containing a door and a casement window above.	II
28 Old Street; 52.36710°N 2.71679°W		17th century	A timber framed house that was refronted in about 1800, it has a brick front and a tile roof. There are three storeys and a cellar, two bays, and a rear wing. The doorway has reeded pilasters, a frieze, and a moulded flat hood, and to the left is a round-headed passageway door. The windows are sashes, those in the lower two floors with stuccoed grooved lintels. At the rear and in the rear wing is timber framing.	II
30 Old Street; 52.36703°N 2.71669°W		17th century (probable)	The house was refronted in the 19th century. It is in brick with a tile roof, two storeys, an attic and a cellar, two bays, and a rear outshut with a Welsh slate roof. The doorway and sash windows have cambered heads, and there are two gabled dormers.	II
Cottages to rear of 2–7 Raven Lane; 52.36715°N 2.71965°W	—	17th century	The oldest cottage is timber framed with brick infill, a tile roof, two storeys, and three bays. It has two plank doors, and most of the windows are fixed, with one casement window. The adjacent cottage dates from the earlier 19th century, it is in brick with dentilled eaves, a tile roof, two storeys, and one bay. Most of the windows are sashes. There is a further range of 19th-century brick houses with slate roofs.	II
16, 17, 18, 18A, 19 and 19A Raven Lane; 52.36665°N 2.71972°W	—	17th century	The houses are in brick in the ground floor, they have vertical weatherboarding on timber framing above, and a Welsh slate roof. There are three storeys and cellars, a front of three bays, and rear ranges. In the centre is a carriageway with fluted pilasters and a moulded flat hood, and to the left is a doorway with reeded pilasters, a fanlight, and a moulded flat hood. The middle floor is jettied, and in the upper floors are sash windows with moulded surrounds. In the rear ranges are further doorways and windows, some of which are sashes, and others are casements.	II
Christcroft (29 Dinham); 52.36538°N 2.72249°W		17th century	A stone house with a tile roof, two storeys, two bays, and two rear brick wings. Above the right part is a brick coped gable pediment. Over the doorway is a sheet metal hood, and the windows are casements.	II
St John's Cottage; 52.36545°N 2.71644°W		17th century	A timber framed house with brick infill and a tile roof. There is one storey and an attic, one bay, and outshuts. Some windows are casements, and others are fixed.	II
The Gatehouse Antiques; 52.36518°N 2.71803°W		17th century	The house, adjacent to the Broadgate, was altered in the 18th century. It is stuccoed, and has a machicolated parapet, and a small turret on the corner. There are three storeys and two bays. On the front of the right bay is a three-storey canted bay window containing windows with four-centred heads. The left narrow bay contains two lancet windows, and protruding from it is a porch with an embattled parapet, containing a doorway with a four-centred head and a lancet window to the left.	II
Walcote House (17 Broad Street); 52.36678°N 2.71836°W	—	17th century	The house was refronted in the early 19th century, and is in brick with a Welsh slate roof. There are three storeys and three bays, with pilasters outside and between the bays, forming an arch at the top of the middle bay. The central round-headed doorway has fluted pilasters, a fanlight, and a flat hood. The windows are sashes with beaded surrounds, and those in the middle floor have wrought iron guards. To the left is a doorway with a semicircular segmental arch and a moulded flat hood. At the rear is a jettied wing.	II
2 Dinham; 52.36686°N 2.72152°W		1654	A timber framed house with plaster infill and a tile roof. There are three storeys and a cellar, and two bays. The windows are mullioned with casements. Each of the upper floors is jettied, with decorative consoles, and over the ground floor is a decorative bressumer. There are two gables with carved bargeboards and finials, and the doorway at the right has a moulded surround.	II
55 Lower Broad Street; 52.36472°N 2.71782°W	—	Late 17th century	A stuccoed house with a roof of Welsh slate at the front and tiles at the rear. It has two storeys, one bay, and a roughcast rear wing. Above the doorway to the right is a pentice hood, to the left is a canted bay window, and in the upper floor is a casement window.	II
Dinham House; 52.36629°N 2.72318°W		c. 1717	The house was extended in 1747–49, and later used for other purposes. It is in brick with a moulded modillioned cornice, a coped parapet, and a hipped slate roof with some tiles. There are two storeys, an attic and a basement, and nine bays, the outer two bays on each side projecting slightly. Steps with wrought iron railings lead up to the central doorway that has a moulded architrave, and a moulded pediment on decorative consoles. The windows are sashes, and on the south side is a full-height bow window.	II*
5 and 6 Bell Lane; 52.36615°N 2.71905°W		Early 18th century	A house on an earlier core, later divided into two. They on in brick on timber framing, with a storey band, a Welsh slate roof, two storeys and cellars, and a front of three bays. The doorway to No. 5 on the left has a chamfered surround and a timber lintel, and the doorway to No. 6 has a flat hood on consoles. The windows are sashes in moulded surrounds.	II
37 Broad Street; 52.36559°N 2.71830°W		Early 18th century	A brick house with rusticated pilasters and a Welsh slate roof. There are three storeys and a cellar, a double-depth plan, and a symmetrical front of five bays. The central doorway has fluted pilasters, an ornamental fanlight, and an entablature. The windows in the lower two floors are sashes, and in the top floor they are casements. To the right is a round-headed passageway door.	II*
41 and 42 Broad Street; 52.36606°N 2.71853°W		Early 18th century	A pair of brick houses with a tile roof, two storeys and cellars, and four bays. The doorways are in the centre; the right doorway has a fanlight and a flat hood on consoles. The left doorway has pilasters and an entablature hood, and to its left is a mullioned and transomed shop window. The other windows are sashes.	II
42A Broad Street; 52.36612°N 2.71854°W		Early 18th century	A brick house with an earlier core, it has a tile roof, two storeys and an attic, and one bay. To the left is a doorway with a plain surround, the windows are sashes, and there is a gabled dormer containing a casement window.	II
51 Broad Street; 52.36660°N 2.71870°W		Early 18th century	A brick house with rusticated pilasters, a storey band, a parapet with moulded stone coping and urns, and a tile roof. The round-headed doorway has fluted pilasters, an ornamental fanlight, and an entablature. The windows are sashes with moulded surrounds and stuccoed keyblocks.	II
10 and 11 Lower Mill Street; 52.36445°N 2.72009°W	—	Early 18th century	A pair of stone houses with a storey band and a tile roof. There are two storeys and attics, five bays, and a rear wing behind No. 11. Above the doors are fanlights, the windows are cross-windows with casements, and there are three gabled dormers.	II
6 Mill Street; 52.36649°N 2.72049°W	—	Early 18th century	A brick house with moulded eaves and a Welsh slate roof. There are two storeys and an attic, and one bay. The doorway has a fanlight and a moulded pedimented hood on brackets. The windows are sashes with stuccoed keyblocks, and there is a gabled dormer with moulded bargeboards.	II
8 Raven Lane; 52.36647°N 2.71948°W	—	Early 18th century	A house in roughcast brick with a tile roof, two storeys and an attic, and one bay. Above the doorway is a flat hood, the windows are sashes, and there is a gabled dormer.	II
21 Raven Lane; 52.36680°N 2.71976°W	—	Early 18th century	A brick house with a storey band, and a tile roof. There are two storeys, an attic and a cellar, and one bay. The doorway on the right has a moulded hood on consoles, with a three-light sash window under an oak lintel to the left. Above is a casement window under a brick arch, and a gabled dormer.	II
Russell House (5 Mill Street); 52.36657°N 2.72052°W		Early 18th century	A brick house with a moulded stone cornice and eaves, and a Welsh slate roof. There are three storeys and an attic, five bays, and a two-storey rear wing. In the right bay is a round-headed doorway that has moulded pilasters, and a moulded open pediment hood on fluted consoles. The windows are sashes with cambered heads under brick segmental arches with keyblocks and moulded sill bands.	II*
Wheatsheaf Inn and Chandlers Cottage; 52.36523°N 2.71783°W		Early 18th century	A public house with a cottage attached to the right, it is in roughcast brick with tile roofs. The public house has two storeys, attics and cellars, and is in two parts, and there is a single-storey wing linking with the gate tower. The left part has a doorway with an ornamental architrave and a simple hood, to the left is a three-light mullioned window, and to the right is a three-light window, the middle light with a Gothick ogee-head. The right part has a doorway in a recessed porch and a simple hood. Most of the other windows are sashes and there are three gabled dormers. The cottage has a single storey and an attic, one bay, a sash window and a gabled dormer.	II
7 Mill Street; 52.36642°N 2.72043°W		1727	A brick house with storey bands, a moulded and modillioned eaves-cornice, and a tile roof. There are two storeys, attics and cellars, and a symmetrical front of seven bays. The central doorway has moulded pilasters, and an ornamental entablature. The windows are sashes under segmental arches, and there are four gabled dormers with ornamental bargeboards and finials.	II
18 Broad Street; 52.36668°N 2.71831°W		1737	A brick house on a stone plinth, with stone dressings, a moulded band, a moulded cornice, moulded eaves, brick pilasters, and a hipped slate roof. It has three storeys and a cellar, and five bays. There are two doorways, one in the central bay, the other, which is smaller, to the left. Both have Doric pilasters, a frieze and a moulded flat hood; the central doorway also has a round head and a fanlight. The windows are sashes with triple keyblocks and stone sills with moulded cornices.	II
19 Broad Street; 52.36661°N 2.71829°W		Late 1730s	A brick house with storey bands, a coped stone parapet, and a hipped slate roof. There are three storeys and a cellar, and three bays. The round-headed doorway in the left bay has fluted pilasters, a fanlight, and a moulded flat hood. The windows are sashes in beaded surrounds, and there is a segmental arch over the cellar opening.	II
24, 25 and 26 Mill Street; 52.36545°N 2.72058°W		c. 1740	Brick houses with a tile roof, two storeys, an attic and cellar, and three bays. The central doorway has a chamfered and moulded surround, the windows are casements under segmental heads, and there are three gabled dormers. At the rear is an outshut that is timber framed with brick infill.	II
54 Mill Street; 52.36682°N 2.72104°W		c. 1740	A stuccoed house with a storey band, a moulded cornice, a moulded parapet, and a tile roof. It has three storeys and a cellar, and two bays. The doorway on the right has fluted pilasters, a traceried fanlight, and a moulded flat hood. To its left is a tripartite window containing sashes, and above that is a canted bay window. The other windows are sashes with segmental heads.	II
55 Mill Street; 52.36694°N 2.72108°W		c. 1740	A house, later offices, it is in brick with a storey band, a parapet with stone coping, and a tile roof. There are three storeys and a cellar, and four bays. The doorway has a chamfered surround, fluted pilasters, a fanlight, a frieze, and a moulded flat hood. The windows are sashes under segmental arches.	II
56 Mill Street; 52.36700°N 2.72109°W		1740	A house, later a shop, it is stuccoed with a storey band, a parapet with moulded stone coping, and a tile roof. There are three storeys and a cellar, and four bays. The doorway in the right bay has reeded pilasters, a traceried fanlight, and a moulded flat hood. To the left is a 20th-century shop front with fluted pilasters and a traceried clerestory. In the upper floors are sash windows with cambered heads.	II
41 Mill Street; 52.36592°N 2.72071°W		1741	A brick house with a modillioned storey band, a coped and ornamental parapet, and a hipped Welsh slate roof. There are three storeys and a cellar, a symmetrical front of five bays, and a rear wing. The central round-headed doorway has fluted pilasters, a fanlight, and a moulded flat hood, and the windows are sashes. To the left is a doorway with a segmental arch leading to the rear wing, which has a hipped tile roof.	II
31 Broad Street; 52.36571°N 2.71800°W		c. 1750	A brick house with storey bands, a coped parapet, and a Welsh slate roof. There are three storeys a cellar and an attic, and five bays. Steps with handrails lead up to the central doorway that has fluted pilasters, a fanlight, a decorated frieze, and a flat hood. The windows are sashes, and there is a gabled dormer.	II
35 Broad Street; 52.36544°N 2.71824°W		c. 1750	A brick house with a pilaster on the left, moulded eaves, and a tile roof. There are two storeys and an attic, and four bays. The round-headed doorway has an architrave, an ornamental fanlight, and a moulded pediment on decorative consoles. The windows are sashes, and there are two gabled dormers with pediments.	II
36 Broad Street; 52.36548°N 2.71823°W		c. 1750	A brick house with a pilaster on the left, moulded eaves, and a tile roof. There are two storeys, a cellar and an attic, and four bays. The round-headed doorway in the left bay has an architrave, an ornamental fanlight, and a moulded pediment hood on decorative consoles. The windows are sashes, and there are two gabled dormers with pediments.	II
1 Bell Lane; 52.36622°N 2.71878°W	—	18th century	The house, on an earlier core, is roughcast with a tile roof, two storeys, an attic and a cellar, and two bays. The windows are sashes, and there is a 20th-century gabled dormer with applied timber framing.	II
2 and 3 Bell Lane; 52.36621°N 2.71884°W		18th century	A pair of roughcast houses with a tile roof, three storeys, and two bays. Each doorway has a flat hood on consoles, and the windows are casements.	II
9 Bell Lane; 52.36613°N 2.71916°W	—	18th century	The house has an earlier core, and is in brick with a band, moulded eaves, and a tile roof. There are two storeys and an attic, and two bays. The doorway to the right has a frieze and a flat hood. To its left is a canted bay windows, the other windows are sashes, and there are two gabled dormers.	II
11 Bell Lane; 52.36610°N 2.71938°W	—	18th century	The house, which has an earlier core, is in brick on timber framing, with moulded eaves, and a tile roof. There are two storeys and three bays. In the left bay is a door and a shop window, and elsewhere are casement and fixed windows, those in the ground floor under segmental arches.	II
15 Bell Lane; 52.36601°N 2.72003°W	—	18th century	The house has an earlier timber framed core with a brick front and a tile roof. There are two storeys and one bay. The doorway to the right has a simple hood on brackets, and the windows are sashes.	II
4 Brand Lane; 52.36642°N 2.71723°W		18th century	A stone house with moulded eaves and a tile roof. There are two storeys, an attic and a cellar, a front of five bays, and a rear wing. The central doorway has pilasters and a moulded pediment hood. The windows are sashes with beaded surrounds, and there are two gabled dormers.	II
8 Broad Street; 52.36735°N 2.71870°W	—	18th century	A shop with living accommodation on an earlier core, it is roughcast on timber framing with modillion eaves and a tile roof. There are two storeys and an attic, and two bays. In the ground floor is an early 20th-century shop front recessed under a deep overhang on cast iron columns. In the upper floor are sash windows in moulded architraves, and three isolated decorative consoles. Above are two gabled dormers.	II
27 Broad Street; 52.36605°N 2.71811°W		Mid-18th century	A stone house with moulded modillioned eaves and a hipped Welsh slate roof. There are two storeys, an attic and a cellar, and five bays. The central bay protrudes forward and contains steps with railings leading up to a Venetian-style doorway with pilasters, a round-headed fanlight, and an open pediment hood. Above the doorway is a tall round-headed window with a moulded architrave and a sill on consoles, and over it is a moulded pediment. The windows are sashes with moulded surrounds, and there are two dormers.	II*
29 Broad Street; 52.36587°N 2.71802°W	—	18th century	The house has an earlier core, it is roughcast on timber framing, and has a parapet with moulded coping, and a slate roof. There are three storeys, two bays, and a taller rear wing. The doorway has a grooved stuccoed surround with a keystone, and a modillioned pediment, and the windows are sashes with beaded surrounds.	II
38 Broad Street; 52.36571°N 2.71836°W		Mid-18th century	A brick house with a modillioned and moulded eaves cornice and a tile roof. There are three storeys and a symmetrical front of five bays. Steps with railings lead up to the central round-headed doorway that has fluted Doric pilasters, a fanlight, and an open pediment hood, and the windows are sashes.	II*
39 Broad Street; 52.36583°N 2.71841°W		Mid-18th century	A brick house on an earlier core, it has pilasters, and a parapet with moulded stone coping. There are three storeys and three bays. Steps lead up to a central doorway with a Gothick fanlight, and a moulded flat hood. All the windows are Venetian windows with stuccoed keyblocks.	II*
46, 47 and 48 Broad Street; 52.36619°N 2.71858°W		18th century	A row of three houses on an earlier core, they are roughcast with a tile roof. There are two storeys and attics, and each house has two bays. Each house has a central doorway, and No. 46 also has a passage door to the right. The windows are sashes, and each house has a dormer in a gable with applied timber framing.	II
56, 56A and 57 Broad Street and Stage Coach Cottage; 52.36712°N 2.71889°W		18th century	A house, later a shop with living accommodation, the front is stuccoed, with moulded eaves and a Welsh slate roof. There are three storeys, three bays, a rear wing and, beyond that a timber framed cottage with a hipped roof. In the ground floor of the front is a 20th-century shop front, and above are sash windows with moulded surrounds.	II
59 Broad Street; 52.36727°N 2.71898°W		18th century	A house, later a shop, it is stuccoed, and has moulded and modillioned eaves, and a Welsh slate roof. There are three storeys and two bays. The windows have moulded surrounds; one is a casement window, and the others are sashes. On the ground floor is a 20th-century shop front.	II
11 Dinham; 52.36637°N 2.72196°W	—	18th century	A brick house with moulded modillion eaves and a tile roof. There are three storeys, an attic and a basement, a front of three bays, and a rear wing with a further wing beyond. The doorway in the left bay has a moulded and rusticated architrave with triple keyblocks, a fanlight, and a moulded pediment hood. The windows are sashes in moulded architraves with triple keyblocks. In the rear wing is a semicircular projection with bowed sashes, and in the further wing is an oriel window.	II
12 Dinham; 52.36637°N 2.72210°W		18th century	A brick house with moulded modillion eaves and a tile roof. There are three storeys and a basement, three bays, and twin gabled rear wings. The round-headed doorway in the left bay has Ionic pilasters, a fanlight, and an open moulded pediment hood. The windows are sashes with moulded surrounds. The rear wings are rendered, and in the lower two floors the windows are mullioned and transomed.	II
9, 11 and 13 Lower Broad Street; 52.36495°N 2.7175°W	—	18th century	Brick houses with tile roofs, two storeys, an attic and a cellar, and a front of three bays. There is a central doorway, casement windows under brick segmental arches, and two gabled dormers. At the rear are wings and ranges, in brick and stone, with some timber framing and brick infill.	II
37 Lower Broad Street; 52.36435°N 2.71759°W	—	18th century	The house is rendered and has dentilled eaves and a Welsh slate roof. There are three storeys, three bays, and twin gabled rear wings. The central doorway has a moulded surround, pilasters and a moulded flat hood. There is one sash window, and the other windows are casements. The left rear wing is in stone, and the right wing is rendered.	II
52 Lower Broad Street; 52.36459°N 2.71775°W	—	18th century	The house has an earlier core. The front is stuccoed and has a tile roof, two storeys and an attic, and two bays, and there is a rear wing. On the left is a passage entrance, the windows in the ground floor are sashes, above are casements, and there are two gabled dormers. The rear wing has two storeys, and is timber framed with brick infill.	II
53 and 54 Lower Broad Street; 52.36466°N 2.71775°W	—	18th century	A pair of roughcast houses with a storey band, modillion eaves, and a roof with Welsh slate at the front and tiles at the rear. There are two storeys, and each house has two bays and a central doorway. To the left of the doorway of No. 53 is a canted bay window, and the other windows are casements.	II
68 Lower Broad Street; 52.36485°N 2.71792°W	—	18th century	A stuccoed house with a tile roof, two storeys and an attic, and one bay. To the left is a square-headed entrance to a passageway, the windows are casements, and there is a gabled dormer.	II
65 and 66 Lower Galdeford; 52.36793°N 2.71380°W	—	18th century	A pair of brick cottages with a tile roof, one storey and attics, and two bays each. There are central doorways, the right doorway is blocked, casement windows under segmental arches, and three gabled dormers.	II
4 and 6 Lower Raven Lane; 52.36599°N 2.71950°W	—	18th century	A pair of brick houses with string courses, the upper storey of No. 6 roughcast, and a tile roof. There are two storeys and attics, and each house has three bays. Above the door of No. 4 is a flat hood, and the door of No. 6 is recessed. The windows are casements under segmental arches, and there are three gabled dormers.	II
5 and 7 Lower Raven Lane; 52.36600°N 2.71933°W	—	18th century	A pair of stone houses with a tile roof, two storeys, attics and cellars, and five bays. The windows are casements, there are two plank doors, three dormers, and a semicircular brick arch to the cellar.	II
9 Mill Street; 52.36619°N 2.72040°W	—	18th century	A brick house with a storey band, moulded and modillioned eaves, and a tile roof. There are two storeys, an attic and a cellar, a symmetrical front of five bays, and a twin gabled rear range. Steps lead up to the central doorway that has pilasters with capitals, and a moulded flat hood. The windows are sashes in moulded surrounds under brick segmental arches and there are three gabled dormers with moulded pediments.	II
12A Mill Street; 52.36588°N 2.72034°W	—	18th century	A brick house with a Welsh slate roof, two storeys and an attic, and two bays. The doorway has fluted pilasters, a moulded head, and a flat hood. The windows are sashes, and there is a gabled dormer. In the left gable end is exposed timber framing.	II
16 Mill Street; 52.36568°N 2.72025°W		18th century	A brick house with a storey band and a tile roof. There are two storeys, an attic and a cellar, and one bay. The doorway has a moulded surround, pilasters, a fanlight, and a moulded flat hood on consoles. The windows are sashes with segmental heads, and there is a gabled half-dormer.	II
17 Mill Street; 52.36562°N 2.72024°W	—	18th century	A brick house with a storey band, modillion eaves, and a Welsh slate roof. There are two storeys, an attic, and two bays. The doorway has a moulded surround, pilasters, a fanlight, and a moulded flat hood. The windows are sashes with segmental heads, and there are two rendered gabled dormers.	II
42 Mill Street; 52.36601°N 2.72074°W		18th century	A brick house with modillioned and moulded eaves and a Welsh slate roof. There are three storeys and three bays. The round-headed doorway to the right has a moulded surround, Tuscan pilasters, a fanlight, and a flat hood, and the windows are sashes.	II
50 Mill Street; 52.36660°N 2.72094°W		18th century	A roughcast brick house with a tile roof, three storeys and a cellar, and a symmetrical front of three bays. Steps with railings lead up to the central doorway that has a moulded architrave and a moulded flat hood on consoles. The windows are sashes with cambered heads.	II
51 Mill Street; 52.36665°N 2.72100°W		18th century	A brick house with a storey band, a tile roof, three storeys and a cellar, and four bays. Steps lead up to the doorway that has a moulded architrave, and a moulded flat hood on consoles. The windows are sashes under segmental arches, and in the right bay is a segmental-arched passageway.	II
37, 41 and 45 Old Street; 52.36743°N 2.71671°W		18th century	A shop with living accommodation, it is in roughcast brick with storey bands and a tile roof. There are three storeys and a cellar, and six bays. In the ground floor, from the left, are a square-headed passageway flanked by fluted pilasters; a doorway with a moulded surround, plain pilasters, and a moulded flat hood on consoles; a late 19th-century shop window; and another doorway - all these are under a fascia on consoles. The windows are sashes with segmental heads.	II
56–67 Old Street; 52.36677°N 2.71604°W		18th century	A row of houses on a 17th-century core, stuccoed probably in the 19th century. They have moulded eaves, a Welsh slate roof, three storeys and cellars, six bays, and rear extensions. There are paired doorways near the centre, a doorway to the right, and another doorway in the left corner; some of the doorways lead to passageways. The windows are sashes.	II
71 Old Street; 52.36669°N 2.71597°W		18th century	A roughcast brick house with a storey band and a Welsh slate roof. There are three storeys and a cellar, two bays, and a rear stone wing. The doorway is on the right and has a moulded flat hood, and the windows are sashes. recessed under shallow arches.	II
133 and 135 Old Street; 52.36496°N 2.71435°W	—	18th century	A pair of houses that were refronted in the 19th century, they are rendered and have a tiled roof. There is a single storey and attics, and each house has two bays. The doorways are in the outer bays, the windows are sashes, and there are four gabled dormers with plain bargeboards.	II
7 Raven Lane; 52.36653°N 2.71950°W	—	18th century	A brick house with dentilled eaves and a tile roof, there are two storeys and an attic, two bays, and a rear wing. The doorway on the left has a fanlight and a simple hood on wrought iron scrollwork, and the windows are sashes with stuccoed keyblocks.	II
Wall south of Silk Mill Lane; 52.36502°N 2.71943°W		18th century (probable)	The wall is in stone and partly in brick, and has stone and brick coping. It runs westwards from Broadgate Cottage along the south side of Silk Mill Lane, then southwards to join the Town Wall. It is between about 6 metres (20 ft) and 3 metres (9.8 ft) high, and contains two gateways.	II
Blue Boar Inn; 52.36675°N 2.72099°W		18th century	A house, later a public house, it is stuccoed with a slate roof. There are three storeys and a cellar, three bays, and twin gabled ranges at the rear. The central doorway has a moulded architrave and a moulded pediment hood. The windows on the front are sashes in moulded architraves, and in the rear ranges they are casements.	II
Broadgate Cottage; 52.36505°N 2.71911°W		18th century	A stone house with a tile roof. The left part has two storeys and contains casement windows. The right part has one storey and an attic, and contains a doorway and sash windows. There are also two gabled dormers.	II
Broadgate Mews (74, 75 and 76 Lower Broad Street); 52.36504°N 2.71808°W		18th century	A row of three houses that were refronted in the early 19th century, with No. 76 facing the street. They are in brick with a tile roof, hipped at the front. There are three storeys and a cellar, and a front of four bays. The doorway has a flat hood on consoles, and the windows on the front are sashes. The wall on the right return is in stone and brick, the front facing the courtyard is roughcast, and the windows are windows.	II
Coach house, Brand Lane; 52.36664°N 2.71672°W		18th century	The coach house is in brick, and has a hipped tile roof with two gables at the rear, and two storeys. On the front are two double doors, a single door, and sash windows, all under segmental arches. At the rear is a loft door in the left gable, and a shutter in the right gable.	II
Cobbled area in front of 29–33 Broad Street; 52.36560°N 2.71802°W	—	18th century	The area of cobbles runs along the front of the houses, between them and the paved area, and is about 1 metre (3 ft 3 in) wide.	II
Corve Bridge; 52.37420°N 2.72051°W	—	18th century	The bridge carries Bromfield Road over the River Corve. It is in stone and consists of three semicircular arches with architraves. The bridge has small rounded cutwaters, a cornice, a coped parapet, a balustrade, and splayed wing walls.	II
Garth House and The Lodge; 52.36657°N 2.71703°W		18th century	A house, later divided into two, it is in brick with a storey band, moulded eaves, and a tile roof. There are two storeys, an attic and a cellar, five bays, and rear wings. The central doorway on the front has a fanlight and a pedimented hood on consoles. The windows are sashes with moulded surrounds and segmental heads, and there are three gabled dormers. The rear wing has two storeys and contains a three-tier canted bay window with applied timber framing.	II
Gazebo, 5 Brand Lane; 52.36603°N 2.71737°W	—	18th century	The gazebo is in the garden of the house, and is stuccoed with moulded eaves, a hipped tile roof with an embattled parapet, and a weathervane. There is a single storey and a basement, and a rectangular plan. Steps with wrought iron railings lead up to double doors flanked by bowed sash windows. On the right side is a decorated arch, windows with ogee heads, and two roundels.	II*
Maryvale, Mill Cottage and wall 52.36492°N 2.72050°W		18th century	A house, later divided into two, it is roughcast on a sandstone plinth, with a slate roof. There are two storeys and a cellar, and a front of one bay. In the front is a doorway that has a panelled surround with pilasters, and a moulded flat hood, and a sash window. In the right return are pierced bargeboards, and in the left return is a two-storey canted bay window with moulded cornices. Attached is a brick wall containing a doorway.	II
Manna Oak (14 Mill Street); 52.36579°N 2.72029°W	—	18th century	A stuccoed house with a tile roof, three storeys and a cellar, and three bays. On the front are two gables with moulded bargeboards. The doorway has a moulded surround, with pilasters, a fanlight and a hood, and the windows are sashes.	II
Oriel House, gate and railings (49 Broad Street); 52.36642°N 2.71864°W		18th century	A house with an earlier core, it is roughcast and has moulded eaves and a tile roof. There are two storeys and a cellar, a symmetrical front of five bays, a recessed bay to the left, and a rear wing. The middle bay protrudes and contains a round-headed porch that has pilasters with Ionic capitals, a frieze, and a flat hood, and the doorway has a moulded architrave. The windows are sashes, and on the left return is an ornate oriel window with modillion eaves and scrolled fluted censoles. In the angle between the main block and the left bay are a wrought iron gate and railings.	II
Pilgrim's Cottage; 52.36664°N 2.71953°W	—	18th century	A stone house, partly rendered, with a tile roof. There are three storeys and two bays. The windows are casements in moulded surrounds. The right return is slate-hung, and the left return is roughcast.	II
Railings in front of 35, 36 and part of 37 Broad Street; 52.36553°N 2.71818°W	—	18th century	The railings are on the edge of a raised pavement in front of the houses. They are in wrought iron, and are set in stone flags.	II
Spring Cottage (21 St John's Road); 52.36538°N 2.71711°W	—	18th century	The house, which was extended in the 19th century, is in brick and stone with a tile roof. There are two storeys, an L-shaped plan, and a front of two bays. The doorway has a simple hood, and the windows are casements.	II
Stanford House (15 Broad Street); 52.36702°N 2.71845°W		18th century	A stuccoed house with moulded eaves and a Welsh slate roof. There are three storeys and a cellar, and four bays. The main doorway has Tuscan pilasters, a fanlight, and an open pediment hood. To the left is another doorway, with fluted pilasters, a fanlight, and a flat hood. The windows are sashes with scalloped boards below the lintels.	II
The Coachhouse and Posthorn Cottage; 52.36717°N 2.71802°W	—	18th century	A house, formerly part of the Angel Hotel, it is in brick with a storey band, a rear wall of rendered stone, and a tile roof. It has two storeys and a cellar, and five bays. It contains a passageway with segmental arches, and the windows are sashes.	II
50 Broad Street (formerly The Jester Inn); 52.36653°N 2.71868°W		18th century	A house, later a public house, now a restaurant, it is stuccoed, and has a moulded cornice, a low parapet, and a tile roof. There are two storeys and three bays. The doorway to the left has a fanlight and a moulded flat hood on reeded and moulded consoles, and the windows are sashes.	II
23 Raven Lane; 52.36694°N 2.71985°W	—	Mid-to late 18th century	A brick house with moulded eaves and a tile roof. There are three bays. The left two bays have two storeys, an attic and a cellar, and the right bay has three storeys and a cellar. The doorway has fluted pilasters and a flat hood. The windows are sashes, in the right bay they have segmental heads, and above the left two bays is a gabled dormer.	II
Former Currier's Workshop; 52.36606°N 2.72112°W	—	Mid-to late 18th century	The outbuilding, formerly a currier's workshop, is behind No. 42 Mill Street. It is timber framed with red brick infill and some stone, and has a tile roof. There are two storeys and an attic, and two bays. There are various openings, and inside some items of the currier's trade remain.	II
54 Broad Street; 52.36693°N 2.71885°W		c. 1770	A house, later offices, it is in brick on a plinth, with a coped parapet and a tile roof. There are three storeys and a cellar, four bays and a rear wing. Steps with railings lead up to the round-headed doorway that has fluted pilasters, a fanlight, and a moulded flat hood on consoles. The windows are sashes, those in the middle floor with wrought iron guards.	II
28 and 29 Lower Broad Street; 52.36434°N 2.71723°W		c. 1770	A pair of houses that were altered in about 1900. They are in rendered brick with applied timber framing, modillion eaves, and a tile roof with coped gables and kneelers. They have three storeys and three bays each. In the centre of each house is a doorway with pilasters, and a moulded pedimented hood on consoles, and the windows are casements.	II
3 Brand Lane; 52.36644°N 2.7171°W	—	Late 18th century	A brick house with moulded eaves and a Welsh slate roof. There are three storeys and a cellar, and three bays. The round-headed doorway to the right has Doric pilasters, a fanlight, and an open pediment hood. The windows are sashes in moulded surrounds with keyblocks.	II
14 Broad Street; 52.36708°N 2.71852°W		Late 18th century	A brick house, later offices, with a sill band, a moulded coped stone parapet, and a hipped tile roof. There are three storeys and a cellar, and two bays. The doorway on the right has fluted pilasters, a fanlight, and a moulded flat hood. The windows are sashes with moulded surrounds and keyblocks.	II
20 and 21 Broad Street; 52.36654°N 2.71827°W	—	Late 18th century	A pair of roughcast houses with moulded eaves and a Welsh slate roof. There are four storeys and four bays. In the centre are paired doorways with pilasters, fanlights, and flat hoods. To the right is a canted bay window, and the other windows are sashes.	II
23 Broad Street; 52.36631°N 2.71818°W		Late 18th century	A stuccoed house with end pilasters, a moulded cornice, and a stone coped parapet. There are three storeys and four bays. The doorway has pilasters, a moulded surround, a fanlight, and a moulded flat hood on consoles. The windows are sashes with beaded surrounds.	II
24 and 25 Broad Street; 52.36623°N 2.71814°W	—	Late 18th century	A pair of stuccoed brick houses on a stone plinth, with moulded eaves, and a Welsh slate roof. There are three storeys and cellars, and each house has two bays. Each round-headed doorway is on the right of the house, and has moulded pilasters, a fanlight, a decorated frieze, and a flat hood. The windows are sashes with beaded surrounds.	II
26 Broad Street; 52.36615°N 2.71815°W	—	Late 18th century	A stuccoed brick house on a stone plinth, with bands, a cornice, and a parapet with a moulded and corbelled cornice. There are three storeys and a cellar, and three bays. The central doorway has pilasters, a fanlight, and a moulded flat hood. The windows are sashes with beaded surrounds.	II
28 Broad Street; 52.36592°N 2.71808°W	—	Late 18th century	A brick house, probably on an earlier core, it has a stuccoed storey band, moulded and modillioned eaves, a parapet, and a roof of Westmorland slate at the front and tile at the rear. There are three storeys and a cellar, three bays, and a two-storey 19th-century rear wing. The doorway has pilasters, a frieze and a moulded flat head. The windows are sashes in moulded stuccoed architraves, and the window to the left of the doorway has pilasters and a stone hood on corbels.	II
55 Broad Street; 52.36706°N 2.71887°W		Late 18th century	A shop with living accommodation with a timber framed core. It is stuccoed, with moulded eaves and a Welsh slate roof. There are three storeys and three bays. Steps lead up to a doorway in the left bay that has fluted pilasters, a fanlight, and a moulded flat hood on scrolled consoles. To the right is a 20th-century shop window, and in the upper floors are sash windows.	II
15 Dinham; 52.36630°N 2.72245°W	—	Late 18th century	A brick house with a Welsh slate roof, three storeys and a cellar, and a front of one bay. The doorway has a moulded surround and a flat hood on consoles, and the windows are sashes.	II
17 and 18 Dinham; 52.36608°N 2.72258°W	—	Late 18th century	A brick house with a coped gable parapet and a Welsh slate roof. There are two storeys and a cellar, and an L-shaped plan, with a three-bay front and a rear wig. The round-headed doorway has pilasters, a moulded architrave and a fanlight. The windows are sashes under segmental arches, and in the right bay are blind openings.	II
19 Dinham; 52.36598°N 2.72258°W	—	Late 18th century	A brick house with modillion eaves and a tile roof. There are two storeys, an attic and a cellar, and two bays. The doorway has a semicircular fanlight and a moulded flat hood on consoles. The windows are sashes under segmental arches, and there is a gabled dormer.	II
15 Lower Broad Street; 52.36486°N 2.71749°W	—	Late 18th century	A brick house with moulded modillion eaves and a Welsh slate roof. There are three storeys and a symmetrical front of three bays. The central doorway has a moulded flat hood on consoles, and the windows are casements, those on the lower two floors with segmental heads.	II
63 Lower Broad Street; 52.36480°N 2.71788°W	—	Late 18th century	A stuccoed house with a moulded and modillioned cornice on decorative consoles, and a roof of Welsh slate at the front and tiles at the rear. There are three storeys and a cellar, and two bays. In the left bay is a passageway and in it is a doorway with a moulded architrave. The windows are casements with moulded mullions and ornamental glazing bars.	II
18 Mill Street; 52.36554°N 2.72021°W	—	Late 18th century	A brick house with moulded eaves and a Welsh slate roof. There are three storeys and a cellar, and one bay. The doorway has moulded pilasters, a fanlight, and a moulded flat hood. The windows are sashes in beaded surrounds.	II
28 and 29 Mill Street; 52.36554°N 2.72059°W		Late 18th century	A pair of houses, roughcast in the ground floor and stuccoed above, with a tile roof. There are three storeys and cellars, and two bays. The door to the left has a beaded surround, and the right doorway has a moulded surround, reeded pilasters, and a moulded flat hood. The windows are three-light casements with moulded surrounds.	II
40 Mill Street; 52.36579°N 2.72065°W		Late 18th century	The house has a roughcast ground floor, it is stuccoed above, and has a storey band, moulded eaves, and a hipped Welsh slate roof. There are three storeys and a cellar, and three bays. The central doorway has moulded pilasters, an ornamental fanlight and an open pediment hood, and the windows are sashes.	II
44 Mill Street; 52.36616°N 2.72079°W		Late 18th century	A brick house that has a moulded parapet with stone coping, and a tile roof. There are three storeys and a cellar, and a symmetrical front of three bays. The central doorway has pilasters, a fanlight and a moulded pediment hood. The windows are sashes with stuccoed keyblocks.	II
2 Old Street; 52.36791°N 2.71743°W		Late 18th century	A house, later a restaurant with living accommodation, it is roughcast with a tile roof and the gable facing Old Street. There are three storeys, and one bay facing the street. It contains a three-storey canted bay window, and a doorway with a moulded surround, moulded pilasters, and a moulded modillioned flat hood. In the right return are another doorway, a late 19th-century shop front, and sash windows.	II
4 Old Street; 52.36785°N 2.71738°W		Late 18th century	A house, later shops, in roughcast brick with a Welsh slate roof. There are two storeys and a cellar, two bays, and a rear wing. In the centre is a doorway that has moulded pilasters and a moulded flat hood. The windows are sashes in moulded surrounds. The rear wing has modillion eaves, a tile roof, two bays, and casement windows.	II
6 and 8 Old Street; 52.36775°N 2.71730°W		Late 18th century	A shop with living accommodation, it is in brick, the right gabled end rendered, and with a tile roof. There are three storeys and a cellar, and two bays. In the ground floor is a 20th-century shop front, and to the left is a doorway with fluted pilasters. The windows are sashes, those in the middle floor with stuccoed keyed lintels.	II
7 Old Street; 52.36782°N 2.71707°W	—	Late 18th century	A house, later a café with living accommodation, it is in rendered brick with a string course and a slate roof. There are three storeys and a cellar, two bays, and a rear range. In the ground floor is a 20th-century shop front and above are sash windows. The rear range is in brick and stone, it has two storeys and an attic, a tile roof, and a roughcast gable with a casement window.	II
12 Old Street; 52.36750°N 2.71708°W		Late 18th century	A shop with living accommodation, it is stuccoed with a tile roof, and has three storeys and a cellar, and three bays. In the ground floor is a late 20th-century double-fronted shop front, a window, and a cellar opening, all under a moulded storey band. The windows are sashes, those in the middle floor with stuccoed grooved lintels.	II
42 and 44 Old Street and 20 and 21 Brand Lane; 52.36669°N 2.71631°W		Late 18th century	A group of four cottages on a corner site. They are in brick with tile roofs, and have two storeys and attics. The windows vary; some are casements, some are sashes, some of which are horizontally sliding, and there is a gabled dormer. On the Brand Street front is an area of weatherboarding.	II
103 Old Street; 52.36597°N 2.71509°W		Late 18th century	A house, at one time the Hen and Chickens Inn, it is in stuccoed brick, with a Welsh slate roof, three storeys and two bays. There is a central doorway, and the windows are sashes in moulded surrounds. On the front is a wrought iron sign hanger.	II
13 Raven Lane; 52.36651°N 2.71967°W	—	Late 18th century	A brick house, partly roughcast, with a slate roof. There are three storeys and one bay. The door on the right has reeded pilasters and a flat hood, and the windows are sashes with moulded surrounds under segmental arches.	II
Brand House (2 Brand Lane); 52.36646°N 2.71687°W	—	Late 18th century	The house was extended in the 19th century. It is in brick with a tile roof, two storeys, attics and a cellar, seven bays, a two-storey single-bay wing to the left, and a further gabled wing. The central round-headed doorway has moulded pilasters, a fanlight, a moulded hood with a fluted frieze, and an open pediment. The windows are sashes with beaded surrounds, and there are three gabled dormers.	II
Churchwarden Cottage and Cromwell Cottage; 52.36600°N 2.72014°W		Late 18th century	A pair of cottages in roughcast brick on an earlier timber framed core. They have a storey band and a tile roof. There is one storey and attics, and four bays. The doorways have plain surrounds, the windows are mullioned and transomed with casements, and there are three gabled slate-hung dormers.	II
Laurence House (4 and 4A Mill Street); 52.36666°N 2.72055°W	—	Late 18th century	Two roughcast houses with a roof of Welsh slate at the front and tile at the rear. There are three storeys and cellars, and six bays. In the second bay is a doorway with reeded pilasters and a moulded pediment hood. The fourth bay contains a doorway with pilasters, a fanlight, and a flat hood, and in the right bay is a passageway. In the lower two floors are sash windows, and the windows in the top floor are casements.	II
Swan House (10 Bell Lane); 52.36612°N 2.71926°W	—	Late 18th century	The house has an earlier core, and is in brick on timber framing with a tile roof. There are two storeys and an attic, and two bays. The central doorway has pilasters and a moulded flat hood. The windows are sashes under segmental arches, and there are two gabled dormers with weatherboarding.	II
Victory House (8 Mill Street); 52.36630°N 2.72041°W		Late 18th century	A house, later a club, it is in roughcast brick with a tile roof. There are three storey, five bays, and two large parallel rear wings. In the fourth bay is a doorway with pilasters and a moulded entablature. The windows are sashes in beaded surrounds with sill bands. The right rear wing has a hipped roof, sash windows, and five hipped gabled dormers, and in the other wing is a staircase window and casement windows.	II
Dinham Lodge; 52.36597°N 2.72320°W		Late 1780s	A brick house with a stone band, a moulded cornice and parapet, and a tile roof. It has three storeys and a cellar, a symmetrical front of five bays, and a small rear wing. The central doorway has a moulded architrave with moulded pilasters, fluted capitals, a fluted frieze, and a moulded flat hood. The windows are sashes.	II*
Dinham Hall Hotel, wall and gates 52.36643°N 2.72159°W		1792	A house, later a hotel (closed 2021 and converted for residential use), it is faced in Grinshill sandstone, and has moulded eaves and a hipped slate roof. There are three storeys and a basement, and three bays. The round-headed doorway in the left bay has pilasters, a fanlight and a moulded flat head. In the lower two floors are sash windows, and in the top floor are casement windows. In the south front is a three-tier bow window. In front of the hotel is a stone wall with coped piers and 20th-century gates.	II
114 Corve Street; 52.37132°N 2.71911°W	—	c. 1800	A brick house with a bracketed eaves cornice and a tile roof. There are three storeys, and a T-shaped plan, with a main block of three bays, and a central rear wing. The central doorway has an ornamental Gothick fanlight and a hood on brackets. The windows are sashes.	II
4 Bell Lane; 52.36616°N 2.71893°W	—	Late 18th to early 19th century	A brick house with a slate roof, two storeys and a cellar, and two bays. The central round-arched doorway has a semicircular fanlight, and the windows are ashes with segmental heads.	II
21 Bell Lane; 52.36623°N 2.71938°W	—	Late 18th to early 19th century	A stuccoed brick house on a corner site, with a roof of Welsh slate at the front and tile at the rear. There are three storeys and an L-shaped plan, with fronts of three bays on Bell Lane and two on Raven Lane. The central doorway has pilasters, a panelled surround, and a moulded flat hood on consoles. The windows are on the front are sashes, and on the side they are casements.	II
7 Dinham; 52.36679°N 2.72155°W		Late 18th to early 19th century	The house has an earlier core, and the rear wing dates from the 15th century. It is roughcast with a string course and a Welsh slate roof. There are two storeys and a front of two bays in Regency style. In the left bay is a doorway with an architrave and a fanlight. The upper floor of the right bay contains a canted oriel window with a moulded cornice and underhang, and the other windows are sashes. The right return is stuccoed, and contains a French window with a fluted architrave, and a canopy on scrolled wrought iron brackets.	II
3 and 4 Friars Walk; 52.36657°N 2.71435°W	—	Late 18th to early 19th century	A pair of brick houses with a tile roof, three storeys and four bays. The doorway to No. 4 has a moulded flat hood on consoles. The windows are mixed; some are casements, and others are sashes, some of which are horizontally-sliding.	II
44–50 Lower Broad Street; 52.36454°N 2.71770°W	—	Late 18th to early 19th century	A row of brick houses with roofs in Welsh slate and tiles. Nos. 49 and 50 face the street, and have two storeys and four bays. The doorway has a lead hood with a cast iron trellis, it is flanked by canted bay windows, to the left is a passage entrance with an open pedimented hood, and in the upper floor are sash windows. The other houses stretch to the rear, and have a variety of features.	II
22 Mill Street; 52.36515°N 2.72051°W		Late 18th to early 19th century	A brick house with a hipped Welsh slate roof, two storeys, two bays, and rear wings. Steps with railings lead up to the central doorway that has a moulded surround, pilasters, a fanlight, and a moulded flat hood on fluted consoles. The windows are sashes with moulded surrounds, and at the rear the wings are gabled with ornate bargeboards and finials.	II
51–57 Old Street; 52.36694°N 2.71620°W		Late 18th to early 19th century	A row of brick houses with a stuccoed left gable end, dentil eaves, and a Welsh slate roof. There are three storeys with cellars, five bays, and rear extensions. In the centre are paired doorways with fluted pilasters and moulded flat hoods. Further out are larger doorways with pilasters, fanlight, and moulded flat hoods. The windows are sashes with grooved stuccoed lintels.	II
2 and 3 Raven Lane; 52.36722°N 2.71980°W	—	Late 18th to early 19th century	A pair of brick houses with a tile roof, two storeys and a cellar, and three bays. The doorways have pilasters, No. 2 has a simple flat hood, and No. 3 has a moulded flat hood. The windows are sashes, and No. 3 has a late 19th-century shop front.	II
24 Raven Lane; 52.36696°N 2.71986°W	—	Late 18th to early 19th century	A brick house with a tile roof, three storeys and one bay. The doorway on the left leads to a passageway, and has panelled pilasters, a moulded surround, and a moulded hood on scrolled consoles. The windows are sashes under segmental arches.	II
18 Temeside; 52.36406°N 2.71436°W		Late 18th to early 19th century	A brick house with modillion eaves, and a tile roof. There are two storeys and an attic, a symmetrical front of three bays, and a rear wing. Above the middle bay is a pediment containing a semicircular window. The central doorway has a fanlight and a simple hood, and the windows are casements with moulded surrounds under segmental arches.	II
Dinham Bridge; 52.36591°N 2.72549°W		1823	A road bridge carrying Dinham over the River Teme, it is in stone, and consists of four semicircular arches. The bridge has ashlar coping, an ashlar band, and cutwaters with semicircular pilasters.	II
27 Bell Lane; 52.36631°N 2.71885°W	—	Early 19th century	A brick house with a tile roof, two storeys and two bays. There is a central doorway with a fanlight, to the right is a 19th-century shop window with a panelled stallboard, and above them is a moulded hood and fascia board on moulded consoles. The windows are sashes.	II
9 Brand Lane; 52.36640°N 2.71779°W	—	Early 19th century	A brick house with a slate roof, two storeys and two bays. The central doorway has a segmental arch. This is flanked by cross-windows with casements, and in the upper floor are sash windows with segmental heads.	II
10 Brand Lane; 52.36638°N 2.71796°W	—	Early 19th century	A brick house with a slate roof, three storeys and three bays. The doorway in the left bay has pilasters, a panelled surround, and a 20th-century hood, and the windows are sashes.	II
30 Broad Street; 52.36579°N 2.71804°W	—	Early 19th century	The house probably has an earlier core, it is in brick with moulded eaves and a tile roof. There are two storeys and an attic and two bays. The doorway has a moulded surround with pilasters, a festooned frieze and a moulded flat hood. The windows are sashes with moulded surrounds under segmental arches, and there are two gabled dormers.	II
60 and 67 Broad Street; 52.36737°N 2.71899°W		Early 19th century	Two shops with living accommodation, they are in stuccoed brick with slate roofs. Each shop has three storeys and a cellar, No. 60 has one bay and No. 67 has two. Both shops have a 20th-century shop front, and No. 67 has a fascia board with ornate consoles. Each shop has a canted bay window in the middle floor, and the other windows are sashes.	II
8 Dinham; 52.36660°N 2.72158°W	—	Early 19th century	The house is in stuccoed brick and has a Welsh slate roof with two gables. There are two storeys, two bays, and a rear wing. The left bay contains a canted bay window in both floors, and in the right bay are sash windows with grooved stuccoed lintels. The doorway has a grooved architrave, a fanlight, and a moulded hood. The gables have ornamental bargeboards and finials.	II
9 Dinham and wall 52.36650°N 2.72155°W		Early 19th century	A stuccoed house with ornamental eaves and guttering, and a Welsh slate roof. It has two storeys, an attic and a cellar, three bays, and twin gabled rear wings. The round-headed doorway in the left bay has pilasters, a fanlight, and a moulded flat hood on fluted consoles. The windows are sashes with moulded surrounds, and there are two gabled dormers with decorative surrounds. The left return is gabled and has ornate bargeboards and a finial. In front of the house is a stone coped wall with a cast iron gate and railings.	II
16 Dinham; 52.36617°N 2.72259°W		Early 19th century	A brick house with a storey band, modillion eaves, and a Welsh slate roof with coped gable parapets. There are two storeys and five bays. Steps with railings lead up to the central doorway that has moulded pilasters, and a moulded flat hood. The windows are sashes under segmental arches.	II
34 Lower Broad Street; 52.36424°N 2.71751°W	—	Early 19th century	A brick house with modillion eaves and a tile roof. There are three storeys, a front of two bays, and a rear wing. The doorway is in the left bay and has pilasters and a pediment hood. Above it are two blind windows, and in the right bay are casement windows under segmental arches. In the rear wing are sash windows, a fixed window and casements.	II
58 Lower Broad Street; 52.36476°N 2.71783°W	—	Early 19th century	A brick house with modillion eaves and a Welsh slate roof. It has two storeys and one bay. The doorway to the right has a moulded flat head, to the left is a canted bay window, and in the upper floor is a sash window with a moulded surround.	II
72 Lower Broad Street; 52.36495°N 2.71804°W		Early 19th century	A brick house with modillion eaves and a hipped tile roof. There are three storeys, and one bay facing the road. In the ground floor is a canted bay window, and above the windows are casements. In the left return are more casement windows, and a doorway with pilasters, a fanlight, and an open pediment hood on consoles.	II
15 Mill Street; 52.36574°N 2.72026°W	—	Early 19th century	The house is in rendered brick and has a tile roof. There are two storeys and an attic, and four bays. The doorway has grooved pilasters, a fanlight, and a flat hood, and to the right is a garage door. The windows are sashes, and there are two tile-hung gabled dormers.	II
30, 31 and 32 Mill Street; 52.36558°N 2.72059°W		Early 19th century	Three brick houses with Welsh slate roofs, each with three storeys and sash windows, those in the lower floors with segmental heads. No. 30 has two bays, a cellar, a doorway to the left with fluted pilasters, and a moulded flat head. The windows in the middle floor have wrought iron window box guards. No. 31 has one bay and a doorway to the left with a flat hood. No. 32 has two bays, a doorway to the right with reeded pilasters and consoles, and a moulded flat hood.	II
3 Old Street; 52.36796°N 2.71715°W	—	Early 19th century	A house, later flats, it was refronted in the late 20th century. The building is in brick with a Welsh slate roof, and has three storeys and three bays. In the right bay is a square-headed passageway leading to the entrance at the rear. Otherwise the front contains sash windows, those in the lower two floors with grooved stuccoed lintels. The rear is rendered and contains casement windows.	II
34 Old Street; 52.36691°N 2.71651°W		Early 19th century	A brick house with a Welsh slate roof, three storeys and a cellar, and one bay. The doorway on the right has reeded pilasters and a flat hood, and the windows are sashes, those in the lower two floors with grooved stuccoed lintels.	II
36 and 38 Old Street; 52.36685°N 2.71648°W		Early 19th century	The house, which has earlier origins, is in brick with some stone at the rear, and has a Welsh slate roof. There are three storeys and a cellar, three bays, and rear extensions. The doorway has pilasters, a frieze, and a moulded flat hood. There are two casement windows, the other windows being sashes, those in the lower two floors with grooved stuccoed lintels. To the right is a round-headed passage doorway.	II
40 Old Street; 52.36677°N 2.71642°W		Early 19th century	A brick house with a roof of Welsh slate at the front and tiles at the rear. It has three storeys and a cellar, and two bays. The central doorway has pilasters, a frieze and a moulded flat hood. The windows are sashes under segmental arches, and there is a cellar opening to the left.	II
46, 48 and 50 Old Street; 52.36654°N 2.71615°W		Early 19th century	A row of three houses on a corner site, on a stone plinth, with a band, a parapet and a Welsh slate roof. There are three storeys and cellars, five bays on Old Street and two on Brand Lane. The doorways, one of which is in the angled corner, have pilasters, moulded flat hood and pediments. The windows are sashes.	II
75–83 Old Street and railings 52.36651°N 2.71570°W	—	Early 19th century	A row of brick houses with corbeled eaves and a Welsh slate roof. There are three storeys and basements, a double-depth plan, and eight bays. In the ground floor are six segmental arches, two containing stuccoed entrances and paired doorways with fanlights, and four with recesses containing sash windows. The left unit, separated by a pilaster, has a canted bay window, and a doorway with a segmental arch. In the upper floors and basements are sash windows, and in front of the houses are cast iron gates and railings on walls of yellow brick with chamfered coping.	II
85, 87 and 89 Old Street; 52.36630°N 2.71547°W	—	Early 19th century	The houses are in brick on a stone plinth and have a hipped Welsh slate roof. There are three storeys and a cellar, a front of five bays, and rear wings. Steps with railings lead up to the central recessed door with a moulded frame and a fanlight, and the doorcase has moulded pilasters, a flat hood and a pediment on consoles. Flanking the doorway are canted bay windows, in the left bay is a multi-pane window in a segmental-headed arch, and the right bay contains a segmental-headed entrance. The windows are sashes.	II
4 Raven Lane; 52.36711°N 2.71976°W	—	Early 19th century	A brick house with dentilled eaves and a Welsh slate roof. There are two storeys, an attic and a cellar, and two bays. The central doorway has moulded jambs, a cast iron fanlight, and a simple hood. It is flanked by sash windows under segmental arches, and there is one sash window in the upper floor.	II
25 Raven Lane; 52.36701°N 2.71988°W	—	Early 19th century	A brick house with a rendered ground floor and a hipped roof in Westmorland slate. There are three storeys and one bay. On the left is a doorway that has a fanlight with cast iron glazing bars, to the right is a similar fanlight over a blocked opening, and above them is a moulded fascia board and hood. The windows are sashes.	II
47 Temeside; 52.36486°N 2.71062°W		Early 19th century	A former toll house, it is in stone and has a pointed roof in Welsh slate and a wood finial. There are two storeys, an octagonal plan, a rear wing, and an outshut. The windows are casements. The ground floor windows and the doorway have pointed heads, and above the doorway is a blocked toll board recess.	II
Case Mill; 52.36456°N 2.70796°W		Early 19th century	A former paper mill, house and cottages, later used for other purposes. On the right is the house, which is in brick with a tile roof, three storeys and a cellar, and two bays. It has a recessed door with an architrave, a semicircular fanlight, and sash windows. To the left is a two-storey range with eight bays, containing a doorway and some windows with segmental heads. Further to the left is the former mill, with three storeys and an attic, and five bays. It contains multi-pane windows with cast iron frames, hoist doors, and loading bays. At the rear is a weir and some surviving machinery.	II
County Library (Ludlow Branch) (10 Old Street); 52.36761°N 2.71717°W		Early 19th century	The former library is in brick with a Welsh slate roof. There are two storeys and a cellar, and four bays. In the left bay is a carriage arch, and the other three bays form an arcade. The right bay has a shop front with bow windows flanking a doorway with a fanlight, and above them is a moulded fascia board. The bay to the left contains a doorway with fluted pilasters and a moulded flat hood on consoles. Elsewhere are sash windows with grooved wedge lintels.	II
Manse Cottage (10 Mill Street); 52.36610°N 2.72036°W		Early 19th century	A brick house with a Welsh slate roof, two storeys and a cellar, a symmetrical front of two bays, and a rear wing. Steps lead up to a central doorway that has pilasters, and a moulded flat head. The windows are sashes in moulded surrounds. The upper storey of the rear wing is timber framed, and there are two gabled dormers.	II
Masonic Hall; 52.36665°N 2.71654°W		Early 19th century	The Masonic Hall, which has an earlier core, is in two parts. The left part is stuccoed and gabled, and the roof is tiled. There are two storeys, and at the top is a pediment broken by a round-headed window. Below are masonic symbols, and a central doorway with a moulded surround, pilasters, an ornate frieze, and a pediment, flanked by casement windows with pilasters, architraves, and moulded pediments. The right part is in stone and has a rusticated ground floor, a moulded cornice, two blind arches, pilasters, and niches. At the rear is exposed timber framing and a round-headed window with Gothic glazing.	II
Mortimer Court (30 Old Street); 52.36696°N 2.71657°W		Early 19th century	A brick house with a Welsh slate roof, three storeys and three bays. The windows are sashes with stuccoed grooved lintels; the windows in the upper two floors of the middle bay are blind. In the left bay is a passageway that has a segmental arch with a keystone and iron gates.	II
Cobbled verges, east side of Broad Street; 52.36678°N 2.71849°W	—	1829–30	The cobbles have been laid on the sloping verge between the pavement and the road on the east side of Broad Street. They stretch from opposite No. 14 to No. 32, and are between about 1 metre (3 ft 3 in) and 2 metres (6 ft 7 in) wide.	II
Cobbled verges, west side of Broad Street; 52.36609°N 2.71846°W	—	1829–30	The cobbles have been laid on the sloping verge between the pavement and the road on the west side of Broad Street. They stretch from Broad Gate to outside No. 59, and are between about 1 metre (3 ft 3 in) and 2 metres (6 ft 7 in) wide.	II
Retaining wall and steps, Lower Broad Street; 52.36466°N 2.71768°W	—	1829–30	The wall on the west side of the highway is in stone and brick and is about 1.5 metres (4 ft 11 in) high. It runs from the outside of No. 34 to the outside of No. 72, and running down from it at intervals are flights of flag-topped steps.	II
22–26 Bell Lane; 52.36625°N 2.71910°W	—	c. 1830	A terrace of five houses in brick with a slate roof. They have three storeys, and each house has two bays. The doorways are on the right, and each has pilasters with chevrons, a frieze with a key motif, and a pediment on decorative consoles. The windows are sashes.	II
16 Old Street; 52.36732°N 2.71695°W		c. 1830	A chapel hall, later a treatment centre, it is in brick with a Welsh slate roof. There are two storeys and a cellar and four bays. The doorway in the second bay has a quoined surround, and in the right bay is an arched passageway. The windows are mullioned and transomed, and contain ornamental cast iron glazing.	II
Chapel House; 52.36719°N 2.71751°W	—	c. 1830	A former chapel converted into a house, it is in stone and brick and has a slate roof, a single storey and a cellar. In the entrance front is a central doorway with a moulded surround under a semicircular arch, and flanked by French windows. Above is a pedimented gable with a modillioned band containing a datestone. To the left is a later porch and extension, and a vestry wing, and along the sides are round-headed windows.	II
58 Broad Street; 52.36719°N 2.71893°W		Mid-19th century	A shop with living accommodation on an earlier core, it is stuccoed, and has a slate roof. There are three storeys and three bays. In the ground floor is a 19th-century shop front with a central door, round-headed plate glass windows under a cornice with ornate consoles on moulded pilasters, and to the left are two round-headed entrances. The windows are sashes with decorative surrounds, the middle window in the middle floor having rosettes and a pediment.	II
24–27 Lower Broad Street; 52.36447°N 2.71727°W	—	Mid-19th century	A row of four brick houses with a Welsh slate roof, three storeys and one bay each. Above the doorways and the windows, which are sashes, are grooved stuccoed lintels.	II
22, 24, and 26 Old Street; 52.36717°N 2.71677°W		19th century	Three brick houses with tile roofs and sash windows. No. 26 has a modillioned parapet, three storeys and a cellar, two bays, and a doorway with pilasters and a flat hood. No. 24 has two storeys. No. 22, to the right, was refronted in the 20th century. It has a storey band, three storeys, four bays, and a doorway with pilasters and a flat hood on moulded consoles.	II
22 Raven Lane; 52.36684°N 2.71980°W	—	Mid-19th century	A brick house with a Welsh slate roof, three storeys and two bays. The doorway on the left is under a segmental arch and has a fanlight. To the right is a tripartite sash window, and in the upper floors are casement windows.	II
Clive Cottages; 52.36689°N 2.72694°W		Mid-19th century	A row of three stone cottages with a tile roof. They have one storey and attics, and each cottage has three bays. In the centre of each cottage is a gabled porch, the windows are mullioned and transomed with casements, and there are nine gabled dormers. All the windows have lattice glazing.	II
White Lodge (2 and 3 Mill Street); 52.36676°N 2.72061°W		19th century	A pair of rendered houses. No. 3 on the right has a moulded parapet, a tile roof, three storeys and a cellar, and five bays. The doorway has moulded pilasters, a fanlight, and a moulded open pediment hood on fluted consoles. No. 2, recessed to the left, has a hipped Welsh slate roof, three storeys, one bay facing the road, and a rear wing. The doorway has pilasters, and a moulded flat hood, and the windows in both houses are sashes.	II
1 Dinham; 52.36701°N 2.72147°W		c.1868	A house in polychromic brick that has a tile roof with decorative cresting and finials. There are three storeys, each storey jettied, and one bay. In the ground floor is a doorway with a pointed head and a fanlight, and above it is a small star-shaped window. The windows to the right have three lights, and at the top is a gable with applied timber framing.	II
Kennet House and outbuilding 52.36546°N 2.70345°W		c. 1870	The house is in stone, with facings in yellow and purple brick, and some timber framing with plaster infill. The tiled roof is hipped and gabled, and has a central pyramid with a cast iron finial. There are two storeys, attics, and basements. The porch is buttressed and has a moulded arch, and the recessed doorway has a moulded architrave. To the left is a coped wall with a circular stair turret, leading to a basement outbuilding.	II
22 and 21A Broad Street; 52.36644°N 2.71825°W		Late 19th century	The house has been refronted on an earlier core. The main block has three storeys and a cellar, and two bays, and there is a two-storey rear wing. The ground floor of the main block is stuccoed, the upper floors have applied timber framing, and the roof is in Welsh slate. In the ground floor are two canted oriel windows. The upper floor is jettied and has a moulded bressumer with decorative consoles on stuccoed pilasters. Above are two-storey canted mullioned and transomed oriel windows under gables. The doorway in the right return has pilasters, a fanlight, and a moulded pediment hood on fluted consoles. The rear wing has a stuccoed ground floor, a roughcast upper floor and a tile roof, and it contains sash windows.	II
23 and 23A Mill Street; 52.36532°N 2.72054°W		Late 19th century	A pair of brick houses with quoins, coped parapets, and Welsh slate roofs. They have two storeys and cellars, and three bays each. Each house has a central doorway, and between them is a passage doorway, all with pediment hoods, and the windows are sashes. The doorways and windows have quoined surrounds.	II
Lloyds Bank (16 Broad Street); 52.36691°N 2.71840°W		1889	The lower storey of the bank, which is in Renaissance style, is in stone, the upper parts are in brick with stone dressings, and the roof is tiled. There are two storeys and an attic, and five bays. In the ground floor the bays are divided by buttresses, there are two arched openings to the left, and two-light windows to the right. In the upper storey, the middle bay contains an oriel window, above which is a coped gable with a finial. The outer bays contain sash windows, and outside these are small turrets with ogee-shaped pinnacles.	II
