= Abraham Clifford Barger =

American academic and physiologist

- Born: February 1, 1917; Greenfield, Massachusetts, US
- Died: March 13, 1996 (aged 78–79); Brookline, Massachusetts, US
- Other name: Abraham Noah Barger
- Scientific career
- Fields: Physiology
- Workplaces: Harvard Medical School

Abraham Clifford Barger (February 1, 1917 – March 13, 1996) was an American professor of physiology who spent his entire career at Harvard Medical School. His research focused on the pathophysiology of heart failure and on the role of the kidneys in hypertension. Barger served as the president of the American Physiological Society in 1970-71 and was elected to the Institute of Medicine in 1974.

== Early life and education ==
Barger was born in Greenfield, Massachusetts in 1917. He graduated from Harvard University in 1939 and from Harvard Medical School in 1943. He worked at Peter Bent Brigham Hospital briefly and served in the Army as a researcher at the Climatic Research Laboratory before returning to Harvard as staff.

== Academic career ==
Barger joined Harvard's department of physiology in 1946. He became professor of physiology in 1961 and was given the Robert Henry Pfeiffer Professorship in 1963. He served as the department chair from 1974 to 1976. During most of his time at Harvard, Barger also held clinical appointments, first at Peter Bent Brigham Hospital and later at Children's Hospital Medical Center and St. Vincent's Hospital. Barger is recognized as a key contributor to the modern understanding of the pathophysiology of heart failure, specifically in the study of coronary artery disease and renovascular hypertension.

After being elected to the membership of the American Physiological Society in 1949, he spent many years in various service roles for the organization, twice serving as chairman of the publications committee, being elected to the APS council in 1968, and serving a term as president of the society in 1970–71. In the 1960s he became involved in efforts to support women and minority scientists, convincing the APS to use funds from a gift from William Townsend Porter to help underrepresented minorities in physiology. The society currently supports an annual award for minority scientists in honor of Barger.

In addition to his work with the APS itself, Barger also served on the editorial boards of two of its major journals. He served terms as editor of several other physiology journals and was a member of and served as president of several Boston-area medical societies. Barger retired from Harvard, assuming professor emeritus status, in 1987. After his retirement he served as chair of the Harvard Alumni Fund, served as president of the William Townsend Porter Foundation until 1995, and worked on a biography of Walter Bradford Cannon.

== Personal life ==
Barger was married to his wife Claire Basch Barger for 52 years, and the couple had three children. Barger died of liver cancer in Brookline, Massachusetts in 1996.

== Awards and honors ==
Barger received a number of awards for his work, particularly from the APS.

- Fellow of the American Academy of Arts and Sciences, 1964
- Member of the Institute of Medicine, 1974
- American Physiological Society's Carl J. Wiggers Award, 1982
- American Physiological Society's Ray G. Daggs Award, 1985
