= Palmer (pilgrim) =

Middle Ages Christian pilgrim returned from the Holy Land

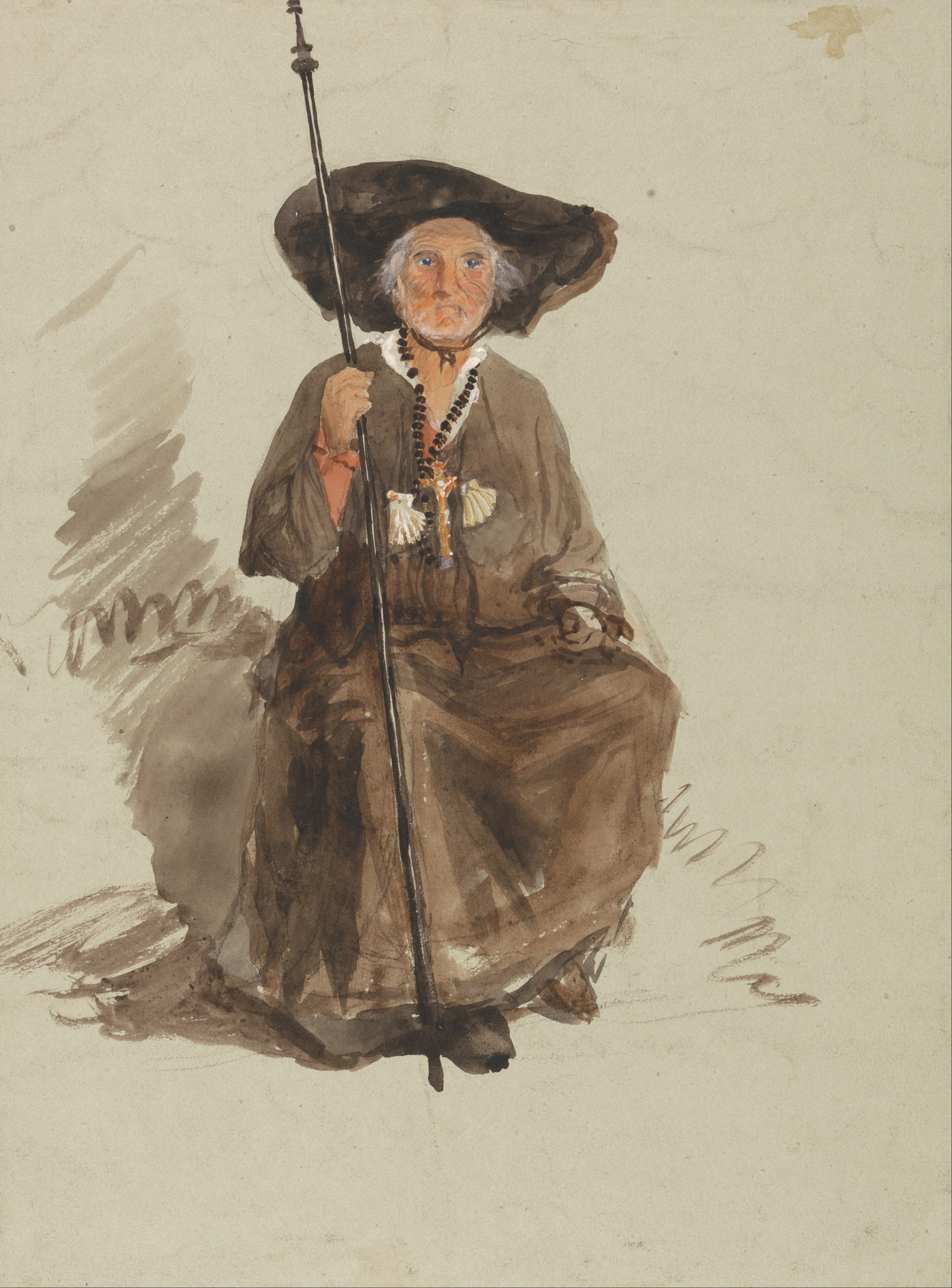
"Study of a Pilgrim"; Samuel Palmer

In the Middle Ages, a palmer (Latin: palmarius or palmerius) was a Christian pilgrim, normally from Western Europe, who had visited the holy places in Palestine and who, as a token of his visits to the Holy Land, brought back a palm leaf or a palm leaf folded into a cross. Palmers were often highly regarded as well-natured holy men because of their devotion to Christ along the pilgrimage. The word is frequently used as synonymous with "pilgrim".

One of the most prominent literary characters to have been a palmer was Wilfred of Ivanhoe, the title character of the book by Sir Walter Scott. A palmer also plays a significant role representing Reason in Book II of Edmund Spenser's epic poem The Faerie Queene.

The major religious guild, the Palmers' Guild in Ludlow, was named after pilgrims.
