= Mount Palmer =

Mount Palmer may refer to:

== Mountains ==
- Mount Palmer (Alaska), USA
- Mount Palmer (Alberta), Canada
- Mount Palmer (Antarctica)
- Mount Palmer (California), USA
- Mount Palmer (New South Wales), Australia
- Mount Palmer (Yukon), Canada

== Locations ==
- Mount Palmer, Western Australia
