= C. F. Palmer, Ltd =

UK scientific instrument manufacturer

C. F. Palmer, Ltd was an independent manufacturer of scientific instruments, mostly in the field of physiology. Since 1987 it has been a subsidiary of Harvard Apparatus.

The company was founded in London in 1891 by the English mechanical engineer and bicycle maker Charles Fielding Palmer (1864–1938). It described itself as making "Research and Students' Apparatus for Physiology, Pharmacology, Psychology, Bacteriology, Phonetics, Botany, etc." It specialized, however, in equipment for the relatively young science of physiology. As a result of good workmanship and excellent contacts with scientists, the company became an important supplier of physiology research equipment in the British Empire until ca. 1950.

Palmer manufactured instruments like the kymograph, invented by the German physiologist Carl Ludwig in 1847, the Stromuhr (another design by Ludwig) for measuring the rate of bloodflow and a 'dotting machine', designed by William McDougall to measure and record levels of fatigue. From the 1930s onward, the company catalogue also mentioned equipment for research in psychometrics. At some time (its records were lost) the company became a "Ltd". In the 1960s and 1970s it stuck to mostly electromechanical devices in an increasingly electronic age and it lost some of its importance as an instrument maker. It was renamed PalmerBioscience and in 1987 it was acquired by Harvard Apparatus.

Both the Museum of the History of Science in Oxford and the Science Museum in London own instruments by Palmer.
