= Palmer Township =

Palmer Township may refer to:

- Palmer Township, Sherburne County, Minnesota
- Palmer Township, Divide County, North Dakota, in Divide County, North Dakota
- Palmer Township, Putnam County, Ohio
- Palmer Township, Washington County, Ohio
- Palmer Township, Pennsylvania
