= Harvard Bioscience =

Harvard Bioscience, Inc.
- Type: Public
- Traded as: Nasdaq: HBIO
- Industry: Life Science
- Founded: 1901
- Headquarters: 84 October Hill Road Holliston, MA 01746, United States
- Revenue: $104.521 million
- Website: Official website

Harvard Bioscience is a global developer, manufacturer and marketer of life sciences equipment to support research and drug discovery. It is traded on NASDAQ under the stock symbol HBIO.

Headquartered in Holliston, Massachusetts, United States, the company's brands include: Biochrom, BTX, CMA, Data Sciences International (DSI), Harvard Apparatus, HEKA, Hugo Sachs Elektronik, KD Scientific, Multi Channel Systems (MCS), Panlab, and Warner Instruments. The company has approximately 355 employees, with 216 of those in the USA, and its principal manufacturing facilities are in New Brighton, Minnesota, Holliston, Massachusetts, Reutlingen, Germany, Barcelona, Spain, and March, Germany.

== History ==
Harvard Bioscience was founded in 1901 by Dr. William T. Porter of Harvard Medical School. He began manufacturing his own physiology teaching equipment in the basement of the Harvard Medical School. Dr. Porter went on to found the American Journal of Physiology and became one of the leading physiologists of his day.

The company invented the mechanical syringe pump in the 1950s and a computer-controlled dosing pump in the 1980s.

In the early 1980s, the company started using the name Harvard Bioscience; the name was not officially changed to Harvard Bioscience, Inc. until 2000. The company completed their initial public offering on December 7, 2000. The names Harvard Apparatus and Harvard Bioscience are used pursuant to a license agreement between Harvard University and Harvard Bioscience, Inc.

From 1996 to 2005 the company completed 17 business acquisitions, including the BTX division acquisition in 2003.

In 2007 the company sold most of its Capital Equipment Business, including its Genomic Solutions division and its Belgian subsidiary, Maia Scientific.

The company spun off Harvard Apparatus Regenerative Technology, Inc. (HART) in 2013 and Jeff Duchemin became CEO in August 2013.

In 2014 the company acquired Multi Channel Systems MCS GmbH (MCS) and Triangle BioSystems, Inc. (TBSI).

In 2015 the company acquired HEKA Electronik of Germany.

In 2016 the company divested AHN Biotechnologie GmbH, which it acquired in 2012.

In 2018 Harvard Bioscience acquired St. Paul, Minnesota-based Data Sciences International for $71 million and sold its Denville Scientific subsidiary to Thomas Scientific for $20 million.

James Green was named President and CEO in July 2019 and the company's performance declined during the latter half of his six-year tenure. In 2019, the company's gross revenue was $116 million, down from $120.7 million in 2018. The company ended the year with $55 million in loans, down from $62.4 million in loans at the end of 2018. Loans were through Cerberus Capital and were subsequently refinanced in 2020 with a syndicate led by Citizens Financial Group. In September 2019 the company announced a restructuring program, including closing their Connecticut operation, downsizing in the United Kingdom, and a reduction in force of over 10% of headcount. Several additional restructurings were implemented from 2020 to 2024.

For approximately nine months in 2019-2020 the company had an activist investor in its stock, Engine Capital.

In 2020, during the COVID-19 pandemic, Harvard Bioscience received $6.1 million in federally backed small business loans from PNC Bank as part of the Paycheck Protection Program. The company promptly repaid this loan after receiving scrutiny related to it.

In the of summer of 2025 the board of directors of Harvard Bioscience was reconstituted and a new CEO was appointed and in December 2025 the company successfully refinanced its debt, obtaining a $40 million credit facility with BroadOak Capital.

== Products ==
Harvard Bioscience offers a wide array of products for life science research. Their product portfolio is broken into five market segments: Fluidics, Laboratory Equipment & Supplies, Molecular Analysis, Cell Analysis, and Physiology.

== Finance ==
The revenue of the company grew from $11.5 million in 1997 to $108.2 million in 2010, a CAGR of 19%. The revenue of the company for fy 2013 reached 105.57 million with the profit margin of 0.12% and operation margin of -1.01%.

In the 25 years since Harvard Bioscience went public in 2000, there have been several intervals in which the company's value was grossly misunderstood by the market and its stock significantly undervalued, including, most recently, in 2019 and 2026.
