= Palmer, West Virginia =

Former settlement in West Virginia, United States

Coordinates: 38°39′27″N 80°35′21″W

Palmer is an extinct town in Braxton County, in the U.S. state of West Virginia. The GNIS classifies it as a populated place.

== History ==
A post office called Palmer was established in 1893, and remained in operation until 1941. The community was named after one Mr. Palmer, a businessperson in the lumber industry.
