= Palmer Road =

Palmer Road may refer to:

== Roads ==
- Palmer Road, designated as Highway 156, in Canada
- Palmer Road, designated as County Road 9, in Yonkers, New York
- Palmer Road, the original alignment and name of the Glenn Highway between Anchorage and Palmer, Alaska; extant segments parallel today's highway

== Places ==
- Palmer Road, Prince Edward Island, a community in Prince Edward Island, Canada
- Palmer Road North, Prince Edward Island, a settlement in Prince Edward Island, Canada
