= Palmer High School =

Palmer High School may refer to several schools:

- Palmer High School (Alaska), Palmer, Alaska
- Palmer High School (Colorado), Colorado Springs, Colorado
- Palmer High School (Massachusetts), Palmer, Massachusetts
- Palmer High School (Texas), Palmer, Texas

== See also ==
- Robert Cecil Palmer Secondary School, Richmond, British Columbia, Canada
- Lewis-Palmer High School, Monument, Colorado
