= H-Bio =

Diesel refining with vegetable oil

H-Bio is an oil-refining processes which involves converting vegetable oil into high-quality diesel via hydrogenation. Hydrogenation is a chemical reaction in which a substance is treated with hydrogen, resulting in a new product. In H-Bio, hydrogen is added to vegetable oil and mineral oil, making a usable diesel that is made up of diesel oil and 10% vegetable oil. The process was first developed in 2006 by the Brazilian state-owned gas company Petrobras, and was primarily established for commercial use.

H-Bio can be used to power many cars that already use diesel, therefore it can be widely sold in fuel stations. The process has many advantages when compared to traditional methods, but also has drawbacks. H-Bio has been tested and confirmed as a viable method to supply diesel globally.

== Process ==
The procedure requires that the diesel pass through a hydrodesulfurization (HDS) chamber, which removes the majority of the sulfur content from the diesel. The hydrocarbons are broken up in a cracking unit, and the diesel is then mixed with HDS light cycle oil.

=== Hydrodesulfurization ===
Diesel first passes through a distillation unit to undergo hydrodesulfurization. This is the process of removing sulfur from petroleum-based products by chemically combining it with hydrogen, resulting in hydrogen sulfide. Hydrogen and sulfur are combined in a hydrodesulfurization reactor, usually under the presence of a metal catalyst, where pressure is added to the bond and it is heated to temperatures ranging from 300 to 400 °C (572 to 752 °F), resulting in hydrogen sulfide molecules that are not included in the diesel.

=== Cracking ===
The diesel is then passed through the cracking unit. This breaks up the hydrocarbons that make up the diesel into smaller sizes.

=== Mixing with HDS light cycle oil ===
Next, the diesel is mixed with HDS light cycle oil (LCO). This is a poor diesel fuel due to its high sulfur content and poor engine ignition performance, thus it is mixed with H-Bio. The two are combined to produce the maximum amount of high-quality fuel from the given amount of supply. When LCO and H-Bio are blended, the fluid viscosity is modified for maximum performance, resulting in high-quality diesel. The resulting diesel has great ignition performance with very little sulfur content.

Finally, the diesel is mixed with other components that do not require the hydrogenation process, and this mixture results in H-Bio.

== Application ==
H-Bio is compatible with any vehicle that already uses diesel as its main fuel source, without requiring modifications to the engine or transmission. Additionally, H-Bio can be sold to consumers in local fuel stations, unlike its counterpart, biodiesel.

== Pros ==
The main advantages of the H-Bio are that:

- The process does not generate waste.
- No special efforts are needed to keep the diesel usable, such as separate storage.
- Cars that currently use diesel can use H-Bio without modification.
- The diesel has better ignition performance and a lower density.
- It is a higher-quality diesel with very little sulfur content. Compared to other methods, it therefore emits less sulfur dioxide, a main component of acid rain and a greenhouse gas.
- Drivers retain the same fuel economy as using diesel.
- The hydrogen used is recycled throughout the process.
- The vegetable oil used for the process can be from various sources, which can reduce the product's price.

== Cons ==
H-Bio also has drawbacks:

- The high cost of the production process has created setbacks. In 2008, Petrobras stopped production because one barrel of H-Bio, produced from soy oil, cost $180; this compared to a regular diesel cost at the time of $104.
- Although the process releases less sulfur dioxide into the atmosphere, other potent greenhouse gases are released, such as carbon dioxide and water vapor. In the exhaust of a diesel engine, 2%-12% of emissions are carbon dioxide concentrations, and another 2%-12% are water vapor concentration.

== Future outlook ==
Petrobras filed for patents to the National Industrial Property Institute (Brazil) to mass-produce H-Bio and distribute it globally. Its short-term goal was to create two refineries and eventually expand to five refineries. It planned to test this process, with different types of vegetable oils, in other refineries.
