= Palmer's Guild =

The Palmer's Guild, more formally the Guild of St Mary and St John, was a major medieval religious guild based in Ludlow, Shropshire. It was traditionally founded in 1284 and incorporated in 1329 and grew into a wealthy, borough-linked institution with wide confraternity membership before being surrendered to the Crown in 1551 and its assets transferred to Ludlow Corporation.
