= Palmer Bus Service =

American bus company

- Service area: Minnesota & Wisconsin
- Service type: school bus, motor coach

Palmer Bus Service (and Palmer Charter Services) is a bus company serving Minnesota and Wisconsin, founded by Floyd Palmer in 1974 in St. Clair, Minnesota. It is the 36th largest privately run bus company in the nation. Palmer runs over 500 buses and vans.

== Awards ==
It received a 2001 National School Transportation Association Golden Merit Award "In recognition of excellence of service, safety and outstanding demonstration of community responsibility." The award was one of six presented to school bus operators across the U.S. and Canada at the NSTA convention in Philadelphia, July 2001.
