= List of public art in Powys =

Map of Wales with Powys highlighted

This is a list of public art in Powys, Wales. This list applies only to works of public art on permanent display in an outdoor public space and does not, for example, include artworks in museums.

== Brecon ==
Image	Title / subject	Location and coordinates	Date	Artist / designer	Type	Material	Dimensions	Designation	Wikidata	Notes
More images	Duke of Wellington	The Bulwark, Brecon	1852	John Evan Thomas	Statue on pedestal	Bronze and stone	Statue 2.5m high	Grade II	Q28087861	
More images	Boadicea and her Daughters	Captain's Walk, Brecon	1855	John Thomas	Statue	Bronze				
	War memorial	Grounds of St Mary's Church, Brecon	1920		Celtic cross	Stone	2m high			
More images	War memorial	Chapel courtyard, Christ College, Brecon	1922		Cross on stepped plinth	Stone				
	The Infantry Statue	Outside the Infantry Battle School, Dering Lanes, Brecon	2006	Anita Lafford	Statue	Bronze				

=== Brecon Canal Basin ===
Image	Title / subject	Location and coordinates	Date	Artist / designer	Type	Material	Dimensions	Designation	Wikidata	Notes
	Abstract	Canal Basin, Brecon		Michael Fairfax	Column with insert	Bronze	Approx 3m high			
	Taff Trail	Canal Basin, Brecon		Harvey Hood	Relief on pedestal	Bronze and stone				
	Canal Story mural	Canal Basin, Brecon		Creu-ad Heritage Interpretation	4 panel mural	Various				
	Abstract	Canal Basin, Brecon		Rubin McKeever	Pillar with inserts	Wood and bronze				
	Brecon Tramway	Watton Wharf, Brecon		Robert Jakes	Sculpture group with panels	Wood and metal				

== Builth Wells ==
Image	Title / subject	Location and coordinates	Date	Artist / designer	Type	Material	Dimensions	Designation	Wikidata	Notes
More images	War memorial	Builth Wells	1924	A. Ruscombe Emery, Robert Meredith	Cross on pedestal with 4 statues & bronze plaques	Stone				
	Gorsedd stones	Builth Wells	1993		Stone circle	Stone				Erected to mark the 1993 National Eisteddfod of Wales
	Shepherd, ram and sheepdog	Royal Welsh Showground at Llanelwedd	2004	Chris Kelly	Statue group	Bronze				Cast at Castle Arts Foundry, near Welshpool.
More images	Caerynwch Tywysog 6	The Groe, Builth Wells	2005	Gavin Fifield	Sculpture	Bronze				

== Bwlch ==
Image	Title / subject	Location and coordinates	Date	Artist / designer	Type	Material	Dimensions	Designation	Wikidata	Notes
	War memorial	Llangorse Road, Bwlch			Celtic cross on stepped plinth	Stone				

== Cilmeri ==
Image	Title / subject	Location and coordinates	Date	Artist / designer	Type	Material	Dimensions	Designation	Wikidata	Notes
	Llywelyn ap Gruffudd Memorial	Cilmeri	1956		Monolith	Granite		Grade II	Q29501487	Marks the spot where Llywelyn ap Gruffudd was killed.

== Crickhowell ==
Image	Title / subject	Location and coordinates	Date	Artist / designer	Type	Material	Dimensions	Designation	Wikidata	Notes
	The Lucas Memorial	Crickhowel	1874		Tapered piller with fountains	Granite				Memorial to a local doctor, Henry Lucas of Glanyrafon.
	War memorial	Llangynidr Parish Church, Crickhowell	1920		Celtic cross	Stone				
	War memorial	Beaufort St., Crickhowell			Monolith	Granite	3m high			Marks the site of a demolished memorial hospital.

== Criggion ==
Image	Title / subject	Location and coordinates	Date	Artist / designer	Type	Material	Dimensions	Designation	Wikidata	Notes
More images	Admiral Rodney's Pillar	Breidden Hill near Criggion	1781–82		Doric column	Stone		Grade II*		

== Elan Valley ==
Image	Title / subject	Location and coordinates	Date	Artist / designer	Type	Material	Dimensions	Designation	Wikidata	Notes
	Navvy	Elan Valley Reservoirs visitor centre	2004	Debbi Leeton	Statue					

== Glasbury ==
Image	Title / subject	Location and coordinates	Date	Artist / designer	Type	Material	Dimensions	Designation	Wikidata	Notes
More images	War memorial	Village Green, Glasbury			Cross on pedestal and stepped plinth	Stone				

== Hay-on-Wye ==
Image	Title / subject	Location and coordinates	Date	Artist / designer	Type	Material	Dimensions	Designation	Wikidata	Notes
More images	War memorial	Hay-on-Wye	1922, repositioned 1950		Tapered cross on pedestal and stepped plinth	Stone			Q122215365	

== Knighton ==
Image	Title / subject	Location and coordinates	Date	Artist / designer	Type	Material	Dimensions	Designation	Wikidata	Notes
More images	War memorial	Knighton	1921, moved & rededicated 1980		Cenotaph	Granite	6m tall			

== Llandinam ==
Image	Title / subject	Location and coordinates	Date	Artist / designer	Type	Material	Dimensions	Designation	Wikidata	Notes
	David Davies, 1818–1890	Near to Llandinam Bridge, Llandinam	1893	Alfred Gilbert	Statue on plinth	Bronze and limestone		Grade II*	Q17739077	Cast by George Broad & Sons, London from the original statue at Barry Docks.
	War memorial	Llandinam	1921		Celtic cross on pedestal and plinth	Granite				

== Llandrindod Wells ==
Image	Title / subject	Location and coordinates	Date	Artist / designer	Type	Material	Dimensions	Designation	Wikidata	Notes
More images	Thomas Jones, 1742–1803	Temple Gardens, Llandrindod Wells			Statue om pedestal	Bronze and stone				
More images	War memorial	Llandrindod Wells	1922	Benjamin Lloyd and Son, sculptors of Rhayader	Statue on pedestal & plinth	Bronze and granite		Grade II	Q29487898	
	Red Kite	Roof of County Hall building, Llandrindod Wells	1991	Walenty Pytel	Sculpture	Steel				Commissioned by Powys County Council.

== Llanfair Caereinion ==
Image	Title / subject	Location and coordinates	Date	Artist / designer	Type	Material	Dimensions	Designation	Wikidata	Notes
	War memorial	St Mary's Church, Llanfair Caereinion			Obelisk	Stone obelisk and bronze panels	5.8m tall	—N/a		
	Taliesin	Neuadd Lane	1996	Gwen Heeney	Sculptural bench	Brick	1.5 m high, 4.2 m wide	—N/a		
	Taliesin Sculptures	B4385 road	2000	David Millward	Sculpture	Oak and concrete	2.95 m high	—N/a		

== Machynlleth ==
Image	Title / subject	Location and coordinates	Date	Artist / designer	Type	Material	Dimensions	Designation	Wikidata	Notes
	Owen family monument	Machynlleth Cemetery	Early 20th century		Octagonal memorial cross	Stone		Grade II		
More images	War memorial	Machynlleth	1924	T. Leonard Williams	Monument	Granite memorial with bronze plaques & Aberdeen marble columns		Grade II	Q29487366	Erected by AS Gilliam of Bryson Quarries, Somerset.
	Owain Glyndŵr Memorial	Machynlleth	2000	Ieuan Rees	Monolith	Slate	5m high			

== Montgomery ==
Image	Title / subject	Location and coordinates	Date	Artist / designer	Type	Material	Dimensions	Designation	Wikidata	Notes
More images	Montgomeryshire County War Memorial	Town Hill, Montgomery	1923	Unknown	Circular column on a square pedestal	Portland stone	50 feet high	Grade II	Q13528924	Monument was repaired and re-dedicated in 2002.

== New Radnor ==
Image	Title / subject	Location and coordinates	Date	Artist / designer	Type	Material	Dimensions	Designation	Wikidata	Notes
More images	Sir George Cornewall Lewis Monument	New Radnor	1864	Designed by John Gibbs of Oxford; sculptures by W. Forsyth	Eleanor cross	Stone and tiles	21m high	Grade II*	Q17742002	
	War memorial	High Street, New Radnor	c. 1918	William G. Storr Barber	Statue on pedestal	Marble and stone		Grade II	Q29488044	

== Newtown ==
Image	Title / subject	Location and coordinates	Date	Artist / designer	Type	Material	Dimensions	Designation	Wikidata	Notes
	Tomb of Robert Owen	Newtown	Tomb 1858; Railings 1902	Railings by Alfred Toft	Chest tomb with railings	Slate tomb with iron railings on a stone plinth		Grade II*	Q17742041	
	Robert Owen	Robert Owen Memorial Garden, Newtown	Erected 1956	Designed by Gilbert Bayes, completed by W. C. H. King.	Statue				Q117241515	

== Rhayader ==
Image	Title / subject	Location and coordinates	Date	Artist / designer	Type	Material	Dimensions	Designation	Wikidata	Notes
More images	War memorial	Rhayader	1924, rededicated 1948	Benjamin Lloyd, architect, & Mary Ann Lewis	Clock tower	Portland stone	13m tall	Grade II	Q29493880	

== Rhos-y-Meirch ==
Image	Title / subject	Location and coordinates	Date	Artist / designer	Type	Material	Dimensions	Designation	Wikidata	Notes
	Monument to Sir Richard Green-Price 1803–1887	Rhos-y-Meirch between Presteigne and Knighton	1908		Obelisk	Granite				

== Talgarth ==
Image	Title / subject	Location and coordinates	Date	Artist / designer	Type	Material	Dimensions	Designation	Wikidata	Notes
More images	War memorial	Talgarth	1957		Plaque on monolith	Bronze and granite				

== Welshpool ==
Image	Title / subject	Location and coordinates	Date	Artist / designer	Type	Material	Dimensions	Designation	Wikidata	Notes
	Hercules	Powis Castle, Welshpool	c. 1692	Andries Carpentière	Statue	Lead				
	Fame	Powis Castle, Welshpool	c. 1705	Andries Carpentière	Statue of a winged female on horseback	Lead statue on a stone base		Grade II*		
	Shepherds and shepherdesses	Powis Castle, Welshpool	c. 1705	Studio of John Nost	Four statues	Lead				
	War memorial	St Mary's Welshpool	1923		Pillar cross & wall with plaques	Stone				

== Ystradgynlais ==
Image	Title / subject	Location and coordinates	Date	Artist / designer	Type	Material	Dimensions	Designation	Wikidata	Notes
More images	War memorial	Gorsedd Park, Ystradgynlais	c. 1970s		Memorial	Stone				Re-landscaped and additional plaques added in 2016.
	Gorsedd stones	Gorsedd Park, Ystradgynlais	1954		Stone circle	Stone				Erected to mark the 1954 National Eisteddfod of Wales
	Remembering the Miners	Diamond Park, Ystradgynlais	2014		Sculpture	Stone and slate				Situated on the site of a former colliery.
