= Hen Domen =

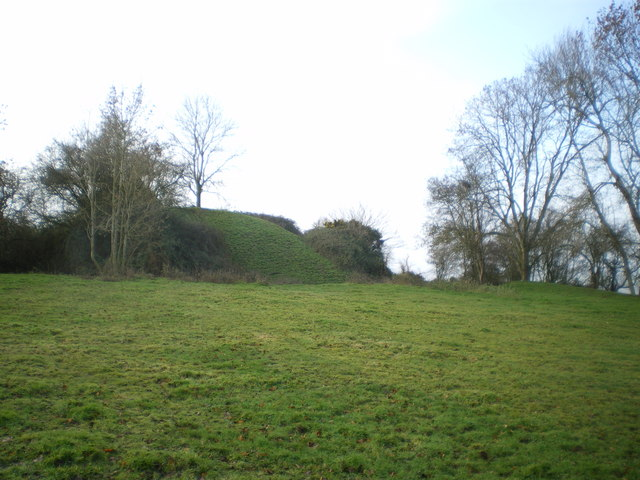
- The motte at Hen Domen

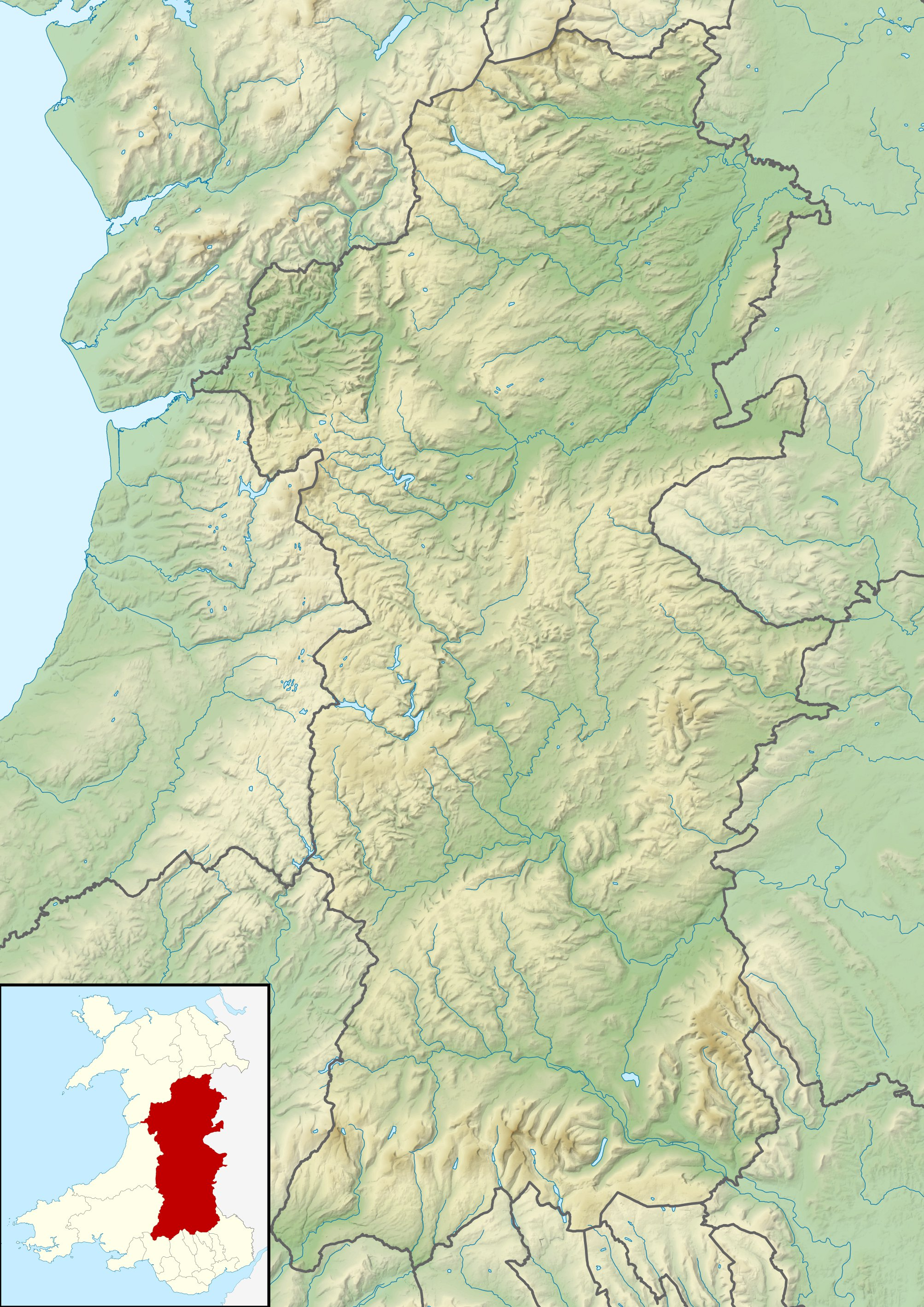
- Location in Powys
- 52.575°N 3.162°W
- Type: motte-and-bailey
- Location: Powys, Wales
- OS grid reference: SO 213 980

Scheduled monument
- Official name: Hen Domen Mound & Bailey Castle
- Designated: 1926
- Reference no.: MG013

Hen Domen (Welsh, meaning "old mound") is the site of a medieval timber motte-and-bailey castle in Powys, Wales. It is the site of the original Montgomery Castle, and was built by Roger de Montgomery in 1070. From 1105 the castle was the home of the de Boulers (Bowdler) family, and it is from Baldwin de Boulers that Montgomery gets its Welsh name, Trefaldwyn "The Town of Baldwin". When the castle was rebuilt in stone (1223–1234), it was decided to rebuild it on a rocky promontory a mile to the southeast—the location of the current town of Montgomery, Powys. The Hen Domen site has been extensively excavated.

There are permanent exhibitions relating to both the medieval Hen Domen and Norman Montgomery Castles and their archaeological excavations (with scale models of both castles) in The Old Bell Museum in Montgomery.

== Location ==
Hen Domen lies on the western edge of the small village of Hendomen roughly 1.6 km (1 mile) northwest of the town of Montgomery, and 2 km (1.2 miles) west of Offa's Dyke. The castle was built on a low hill, only 0.7 km (0.4 miles) east of the Ford of Rhydwhymanan (an important shallow crossing of the River Severn), and offered good views of the Severn Valley to the north and west, and of the Vale of Montgomery to the east.

== Description ==
The site of the Hen Domen motte and bailey castle comprises a roughly oval area of 50 metres (160 ft) by 40 metres (130 ft) lying in a south-west to north-east direction. The site is surrounded by a roughly oval ditch with a depth of 2.7 metres (8.9 ft). The motte is in the south west corner and is 8 metres (26 ft) high, and steeply sided with a flat summit with a diameter of 6.7 metres (22 ft). The bailey occupies an area of roughly 0.13 hectares (1/3 acre).

Excavations from the 1960s until the 1990s have revealed traces of a series of grand and complex buildings including a towering timber building on the motte, connected by a bridge to the bailey with a large hall, 5 metres (16 ft) by 6 metres (20 ft). Other evidence and remains include a wooden palisade which stood on the bailey defences, a wooden tower, a gatehouse, a granary and a possible chapel.

== History ==
Hen Domen was built sometime soon after 1071 when Roger de Montgomery, the first Earl of Shrewsbury, was given extensive areas of Shropshire by William the Conqueror. Archaeological evidence suggests that it was completed before 1100. Roger de Montgomery named the castle Montgomery after the town in Normandy where he came from. By 1093, it was captured by Prince Cadwgan ap Bleddyn and his brothers during a rebellion.

== Access ==
The site can be viewed from a nearby lane off the B4385, but the site itself is on private land and can only be visited with the permission of the owner.

== See also ==
- Castles in Great Britain and Ireland
- List of castles in Wales
- List of Scheduled Roman to modern Monuments in Powys (Montgomeryshire)
