= Ludlow Buttercross =

18th century market hall in Ludlow, Shropshire, England

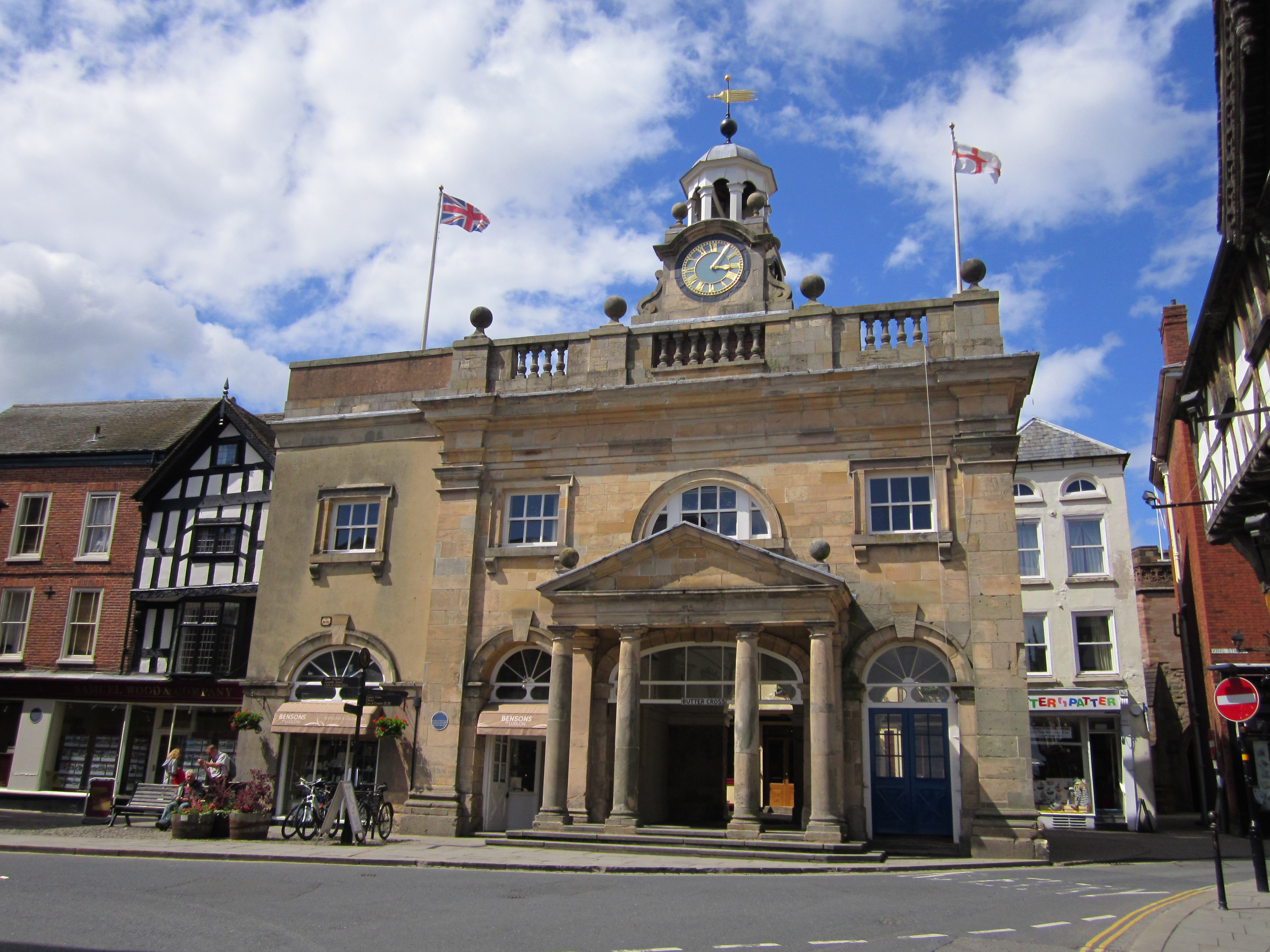
- The Buttercross from Broad Street

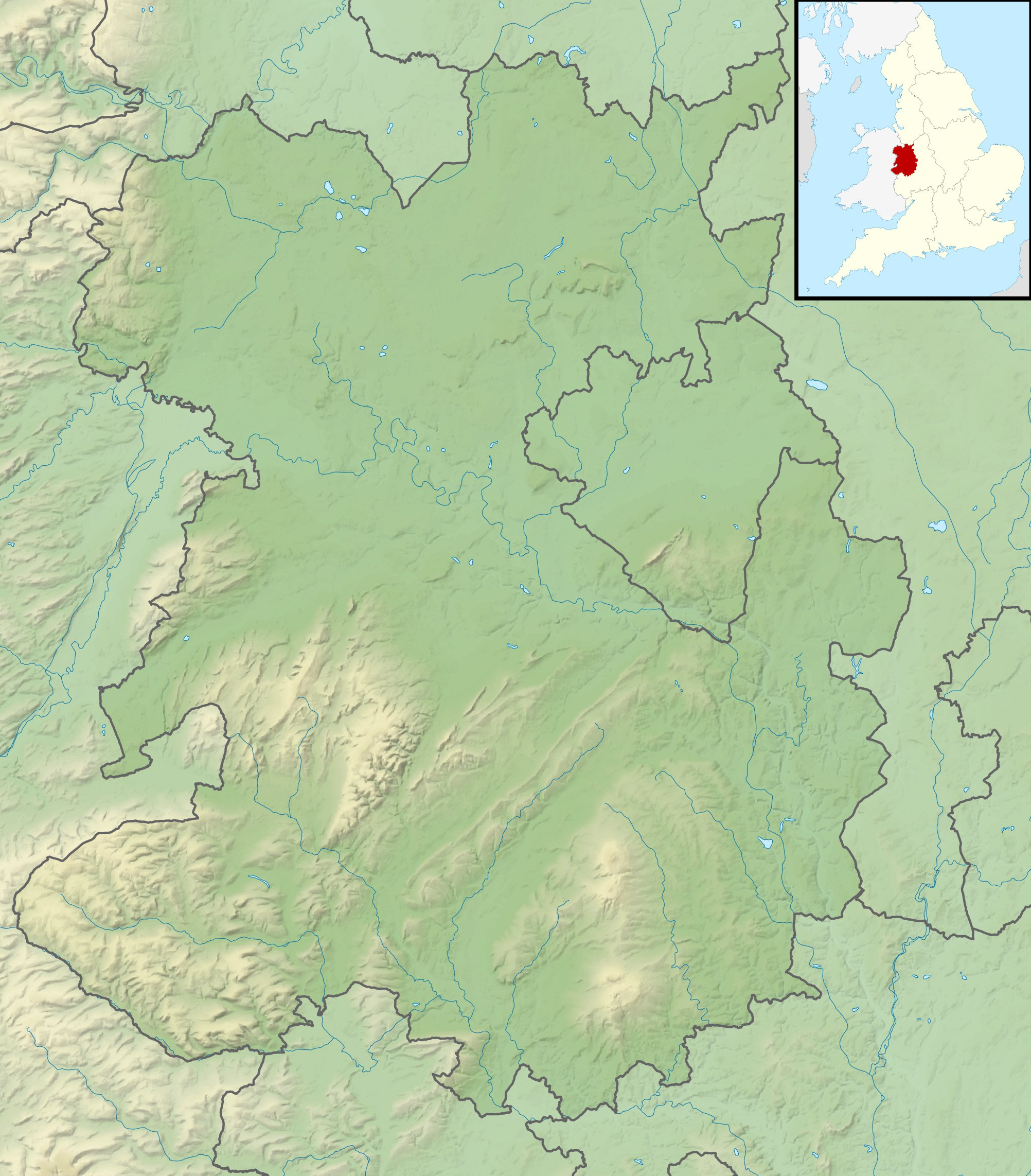
- Location within Shropshire
- 52.3678°N 2.7191°W
- Type: Market hall
- Location: Ludlow, Shropshire

History
- Built: 1746

Site notes
- Architect: William Baker of Audlem
- Architectural style: Neoclassical

Listed Building – Grade I
- Official name: The Butter Cross, Ludlow
- Designated: 15 April 1954
- Reference no.: 1289674

The Buttercross in Ludlow, Shropshire, England, is a market hall dating from 1746. Such market halls, or crosses, may derive from the high crosses or free-standing stones of the Early Mediaeval period. In the Middle Ages they were often used as gathering points in the centres of communities, generally as venues for regular markets. Beneath the hall was an open arcade, now partly enclosed, where stalls selling produce could be set up. The Buttercross was designed by a local architect, William Baker of Audlem, and is a Grade I listed building.

== History ==
Market crosses or halls can be found in the centres of many British towns and cities. Although their origins are unclear, they are generally believed to derive from the High crosses or free-standing stones of the Early Mediaeval period. (Note: The Scottish Mercat cross is of similar origin.) In the Middle Ages they frequently became the focal point for marketplaces, where communities gathered to trade. Historic England suggests that the presence of a cross in a marketplace may have served to “validate transactions”. James Masschaele, in his study, The Public Space of the Marketplace in Medieval England, notes that marketplaces also served an important social function as a location for the “retailing of news and gossip”. Their religious associations led to many crosses being damaged or destroyed during the Reformation and in the aftermath of the Civil War.

The Ludlow Buttercross dates from 1746. Its architect, William Baker (1705–1771) was active in Shropshire and its adjacent counties in the middle of the 18th century. In Ludlow, and elsewhere, a major patron was Henry Herbert, later created Earl of Powis, who sat as member of parliament for the Ludlow constituency, and served on the town's council and as the county's Lord Lieutenant. (Note: In addition to ensuring Baker received the contract for the Ludlow Buttercross, Herbert secured Baker's appointment as the architect of Montgomery Town Hall, as well as employing him privately at Oakly Park, and later Powis Castle.) As well as providing the venue for the town's market, the Buttercross housed the town's council chamber on its upper floor. The council moved out to the Guildhall in 2012, and the Buttercross is now occupied by the town's museum.

== Architecture and description ==
The Buttercross is of two storeys and three bays fronted by a portico, with a pedimented roof and a clock set into a cupola above. The building material is cut stone from the Grinshill quarry in the north of the county. Baker clearly took the design from plates illustrating James Gibbs' Book of Architecture, published in 1728. The bell in the cupola was acquired from the old St Leonard's Church on Corve Street. John Newman, in the revised Shropshire volume in The Buildings of England series published in 2006, said of Baker's work at the Buttercross; "[while] not polished, it has an attractiveness robustness".

== Sources ==
- Masschaele, James (April 2002). "The Public Space of the Marketplace in Medieval England". Journal of the Medieval Academy of America. 77 (2): 383–412. doi:10.2307/3301326. JSTOR 3301326. S2CID 162569055.
- Newman, John; Pevsner, Nikolaus (2006). Shropshire. The Buildings of England. New Haven, US and London: Yale University Press. ISBN 978-0-300-12083-7. OCLC 70671576.
