= Baldwin de Boulers =

Flemish noble

Baldwin de Boulers came to England in 1105 when he was granted the Lordship of Montgomery, Powys in marriage with Sybil de Falaise. Sybil was referred to as the niece of Henry I of England but is commonly believed, probably incorrectly, to be one of his illegitimate children.

Baldwin was of a Flemish family from Boelare and his father was Stephen, Baron de Boelare. Boelare is now known as NederBoelare and is part of the town of Geraardsbergen, East Flanders, Belgium.

The de Boulers were based at Hen Domen, the original site for Montgomery Castle and it is from Baldwin that Montgomery gets its Welsh name, Trefaldwyn "The Town of Baldwin".

The de Boulers continued as a prominent Shropshire family, becoming the Bowdlers.

== Sources ==
- Hope Bowdler, A History of the County of Shropshire: Volume 10: Munslow Hundred (part), The Liberty and Borough of Wenlock (1998), pp. 44–52
- A Topographical Dictionary of Wales, Samuel Lewis, 1849, pages 223–238
- Antiquities of Shropshire By Robert William Eyton Published 1860
- Miscellanea Genealogica Et Heraldica: Fourth Series edited by W. Bruce Bannerman, published 2001, ISBN 1-4021-9405-6
- Plea Rolls for Staffordshire: 1225-6, Staffordshire Historical Collections, vol. 4 (1883), pp. 32–40
- Plea Rolls for Staffordshire: 1239-43, Staffordshire Historical Collections, vol. 4 (1883), pp. 90–102.
- "Affairs of State: the illegitimate children of Henry I", Journal of Medieval History 29 (2003): 129–151 Kathleen Thompson
