= Montgomery Castle =

Grade I listed building in Powys, Wales

- Montgomery, Powys
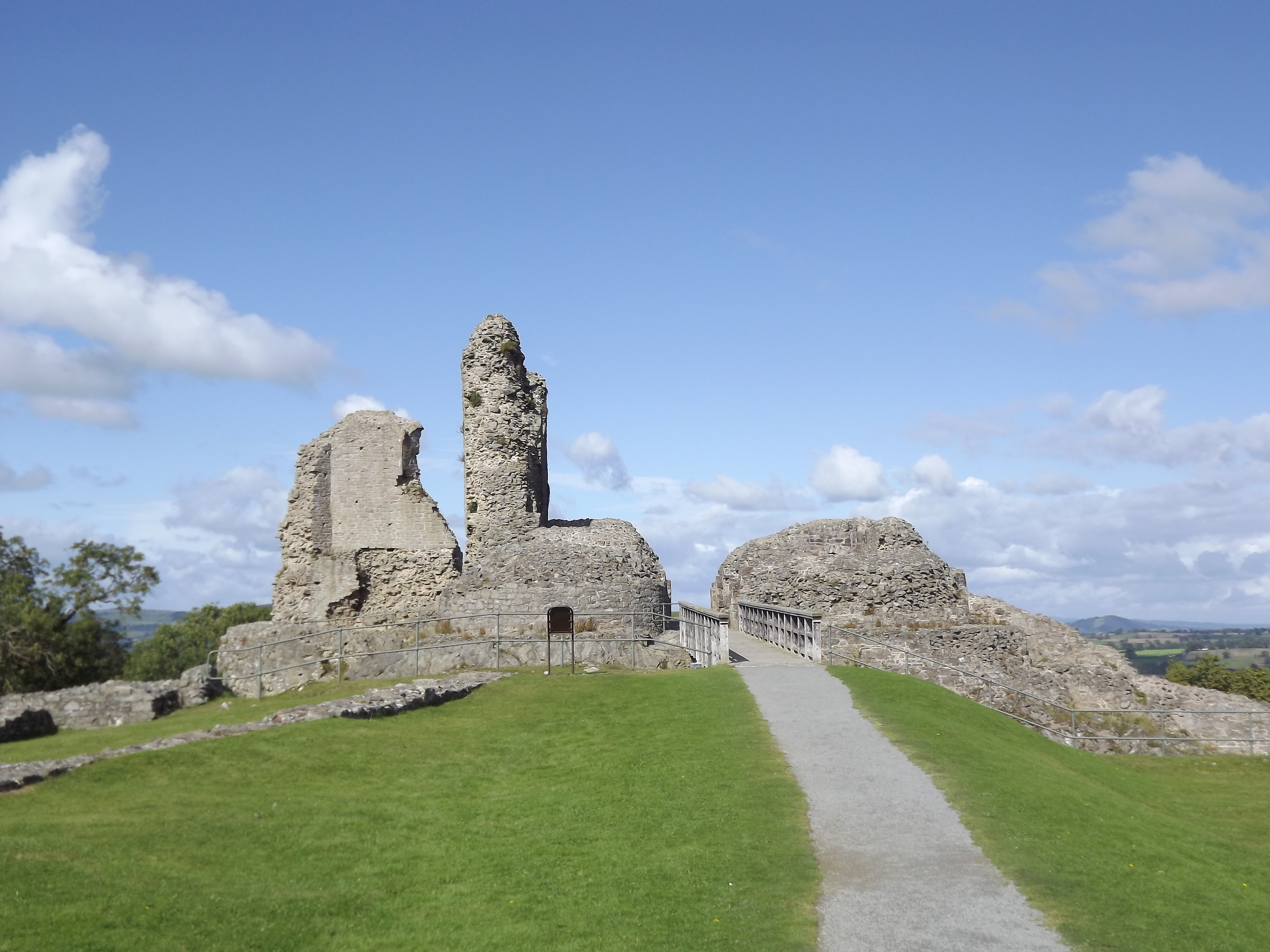
- Ruined gatehouse to the inner ward, from the south

Site information
- Type: Norman castle
- Open to the public: Yes
- Condition: Ruins

Location
- Location within Powys
- Coordinates: 52.56253°N 3.15061°W

Site history
- Events: Wars of the Three Kingdoms

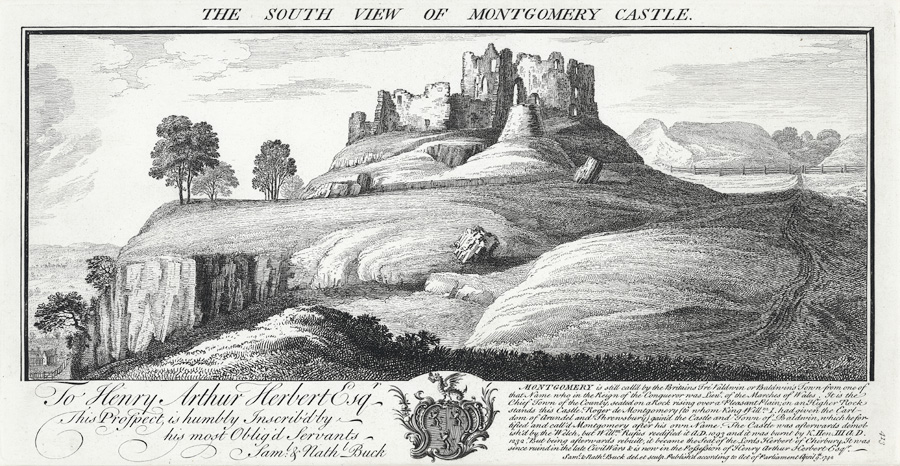
The south view of Montgomery Castle

Montgomery Castle (Welsh: Castell Trefaldwyn) is a stone castle looking over the town of Montgomery in Powys, Mid Wales. It is one of many Norman castles on the border between Wales and England.

Its strategic importance in the Welsh Marches meant that it was destroyed and rebuilt a number of times until the early 14th century, when the area was largely pacified. During the First English Civil War, it was the site of the largest battle in Wales on 17 September 1644; the walls were slighted after the Second English Civil War in 1649 to prevent the castle being used again.

== Motte and bailey castle ==
The original motte and bailey is now known as Hen Domen and was built at the order of Roger de Montgomery, Earl of Shrewsbury, sometime between 1071 and 1074. In 1093, it was captured by Prince Cadwgan ap Bleddyn and his brothers. After the rebellion of his son Robert of Belleme in 1102, the castle was given to Baldwin de Boulers, the derivation of its Welsh name, "Trefaldwyn" or "Baldwin's town". The de Boulers (later known as Bowdler) family held the castle until 1214, when it was destroyed by Prince Llywelyn ab Iorwerth of the Royal House of Aberffraw.

== Stone castle ==
The rebuilding of Montgomery Castle in stone was commenced in the late summer of 1223 on the 16th birthday of Henry III of England, a mile to the south-east of the original site. Its architect was Hubert de Burgh, who also rebuilt Skenfrith Castle, Grosmont Castle and White Castle in the Welsh Marches. From 1223 until 1228 masons worked solidly building the entire inner ward, or donjon as it was then known, on a great rock above the later town of Montgomery. This work consisted of the gatehouse, two D-shaped towers and the apartments which crowded around the curtain wall of the inner ward. After an unsuccessful attack by Prince Llywelyn ab Iorwerth in 1228, the middle and outer wards were added; another attack in 1233 resulted in damage to the well tower, which had to be subsequently repaired and re-roofed.

Montgomery was granted a royal charter in 1227, making it the oldest borough in Wales, and in 1267 hosted negotiations for the Treaty of Montgomery, where Henry III granted Llywelyn ap Gruffudd the title of Prince of Wales. In December 1282, the castle garrison formed part of the army that defeated and killed Llywelyn at the Battle of Orewin Bridge.

== Owain Glyndŵr ==
The walled town of Montgomery was attacked by the forces of Owain Glyndŵr in 1402 and sacked and burned. The local forces successfully defended the castle, but the town remained a ruin until the early 17th century.

== Wars of the Three Kingdoms ==
When the First English Civil War began in August 1642, Mid Wales was largely Royalist and the castle held for Charles I by the elderly Lord Herbert of Cherbury. In September 1644, he surrendered to Parliamentarian troops commanded by Sir Thomas Myddelton and Thomas Mytton. On 18 September, a Royalist attempt to retake the castle was repulsed in what was the biggest battle of the war in Wales and a major victory for Parliament. However, the new Parliamentarian governor Sir John Pryce, a Royalist defector, switched sides again in May 1645.

Much of Wales rose again in the 1648 Second English Civil War and the castle walls were demolished by Parliament in June 1649, despite opposition from the 2nd Lord Herbert, who succeeded his father in 1648. This policy was followed throughout England and Wales to prevent them being used again, reducing the number and cost of garrisons required. He was the last to use the castle as a residence and was buried at Montgomery in 1655.

== Finds and exhibition ==
There are permanent exhibitions relating to the medieval Hen Domen and Norman Montgomery Castles and their archaeological excavations with scale models of both in The Old Bell Museum, Montgomery, Powys.

== In popular culture ==
Hungarian poet Janos Arany's ballad The Bards of Wales, written in 1857, retells the legend of the 500 Welsh bards allegedly burned at the stake by Edward I of England for refusing to sing his praises during a banquet at Montgomery Castle, following the Edwardian conquest of Wales.

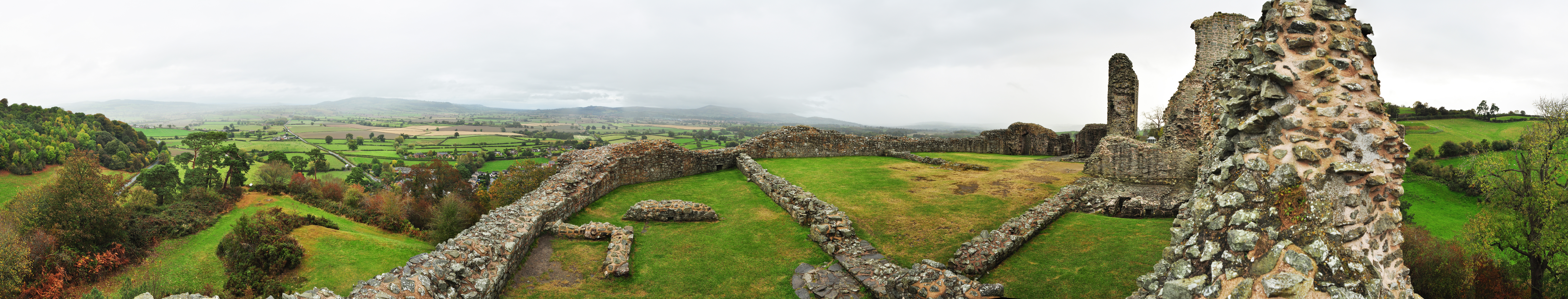
270° panorama inside the ruins of the Montgomery Castle, Montgomery, Wales. This panorama shows the castle walls and grassy interior courtyards as well as views of the Welsh countryside as seen on a rainy October afternoon.
360° panorama of Montgomery and the Montgomery Castle, Wales. This panorama shows the castle overlooking the town as well as views of the Welsh countryside as seen on a rainy October afternoon.

== See also ==
- Castles in Great Britain and Ireland
- List of castles in Wales
- The Old Bell Museum, Montgomery, Powys.

== Sources ==
- Plant. "Battle of Montgomery". BCW Project.
- Hutton, Ronald (2003). The Royalist War Effort 1642–1646. Routledge. ISBN 978-0-415-30540-2.
- Williams, W.R (1895). The parliamentary history of the principality of Wales, from the earliest times to the present day, 1541–1895.
