= William Baker of Audlem =

English architect (1705–1771)

William Baker
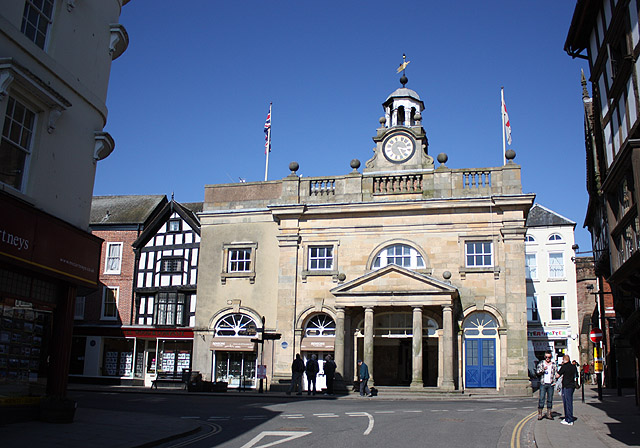
- The Buttercross, Broad Street, Ludlow 1743-4
- Born: 1705; London, England
- Died: 1771 (aged 65–66); Audlem, Cheshire, England
- Education: Possibly a pupil of Francis Smith of Warwick
- Occupation: Architect
- Buildings: Montgomery Town Hall, The Buttermarket Ludlow,

William Baker of Audlem (1705–1771) was an architect, surveyor and building contractor, working in Shropshire and the adjacent counties in the middle years of the 18th century.

== Early life ==
He was the son of Richard Baker, who had moved from London to Ludlow. In 1737 he married Jane Dod of Audlem and for a time lived at Bridgnorth. In the 1740s his wife inherited Highfields House and they moved to Audlem.

== Career ==
Baker was employed by the noted architect Francis Smith of Warwick in the 1730s. His account book for the years 1748–1759 survives, which provides information about his architectural and surveying practice. The house in which he lived at Highfields was the subject of an article in Country Life, where a portrait of the architect survives.

=== Architectural work ===
Baker was well grounded in the fashionable architecture of the early 18th century, having first worked for Francis Smith of Warwick. He is mentioned as working as a carpenter for Smith at Ditchley in Oxfordshire in 1727. He set up his own practice around 1740 and also acted as a building contractor and surveyor. Initially he developed the practice in eastern Shropshire and Staffordshire and continued to work for many of clients of Francis Smith after Smith's death in 1738. Houses by Smith which Baker continued to work on included Mawley Hall in Shropshire, Swynerton Hall in Derbyshire and Wingerworth Hall in Derbyshire. He always had a close relationship with the innovative Shrewsbury architect Thomas Farnolls Pritchard. In 1743 at Ludlow, both Prichard and Baker put forward plans for the Buttercross, but it was Baker who was selected to do the work. In 1746 Baker was paid for the plans and work at the Royal Shrewsbury Infirmary, but the plans are signed by Thomas Farnolls Pritchard. It is likely that Pritchard was working under Baker on this project. Again for the building of St John's Church, Wolverhampton it is likely that Pritchard was the supervising architect working under Baker. In 1775–1775, after Baker's death, Pritchard continued Baker's survey work at Powis Castle.

=== The Ludlow Buttercross and Henry Arthur Herbert ===
Most notably Baker gained the patronage of Henry Arthur Herbert (1703–72), who became Earl of Powis in 1748

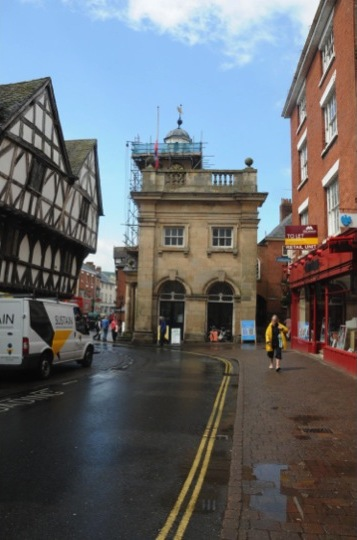
Ludlow Buttercross from the east

Baker would have known Henry Herbert from his Ludlow connections. Herbert was the Whig Member of Parliament and a member of Ludlow Town Council when Baker was awarded the contract to build the Ludlow Buttercross. Also in 1743 Henry Herbert relinquished his position as Member of Parliament when he inherited Powis Castle and became Lord Herbert of Chirbury. In 1735 he had been appointed Custos Rotulorum of Montgomeryshire and Lord-Lieutenant of Shropshire. and this now provided him with a power base to dispense patronage in both Montgomeryshire and Shropshire. Baker's design of the Buttercross (which housed the Ludlow Council Chamber) is based on James Gibbs' A Book of Architecture (1728). Clearly the Buttercross impressed Herbert.

Between 1748 and 1758 he got Baker to alter his house at Oakly Park at Bromfield, just outside Ludlow. Then, between 1748 and 1754, Baker undertook repairs at Powis Castle, possibly in preparation for Herbert to move in. Also in 1748, Herbert got William Baker to design and build Montgomery Town Hall. The new Town Hall was intended to accommodate the Court of Great Sessions when it met at Montgomery and over which Herbert presided as Custos Rotulorum. At Bishops Castle Baker submitted designs for a new Town Hall to Herbert in 1745, but it was slightly later that the Town Hall was built and to modified designs.

== Richard Baker ==
His son Richard Baker (1743–1803), continued the practice after his father's death in 1771. Richard seems to have practised mainly as a building surveyor, and there are few buildings that he designed.

== List of architectural works ==
=== Public building and monuments ===
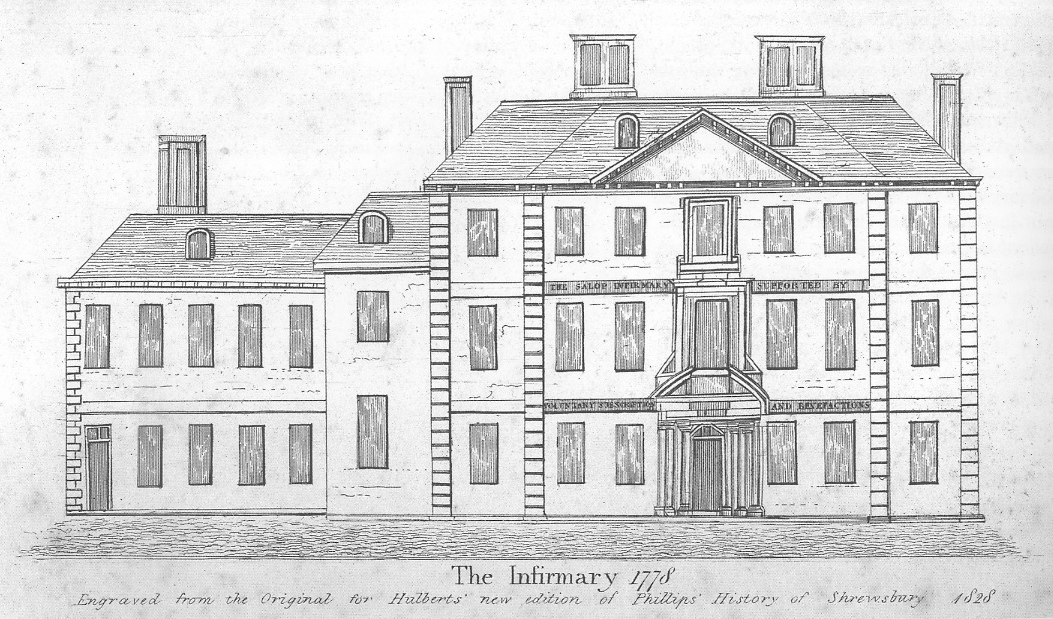
Royal Shropshire Infirmary. 1747

- Bishops Castle, Shropshire. Town Hall 1745–1750
- Ludlow, Shropshire, The Butter Cross 1743–1744. The design is derived from James Gibb's 'Book of Architecture', 1728. Faced with Grinshill stone with a low pedimented portico and a semi-circular or lunette window above. The parapet has heavy balustrading, capped with ball pinnacles.
- Shrewsbury. Royal Shropshire Infirmary 1747. The plans are signed by Thomas Farnolls Pritchard, but Baker was commissioned and paid for the work.
- Montgomery, The Town Hall 1748–1751,
- Hereford, College of the Vicars Choral.1750. Repairs and alterations

=== Churches ===
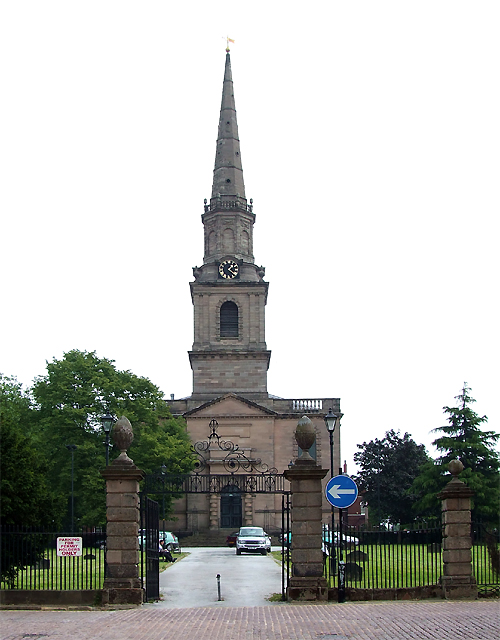
The Church of St. John in the Square, Wolverhampton. Baker was the main contractor1756-9.

- St Peter's Church, Congleton, Cheshire. A church here since the 15th century (The Higher Chapel). The present church was built by William Baker in 1740–1742 for £2,000.
- Stone, Staffordshire, Gothic revival 1754–1758 designed by William Robinson, Clerk to the Board of Works, who produced the first designs for Strawberry Hill for Horace Walpole
- St John's Church, Wolverhampton, 1756–1759. A very grand ashlar faced church which is based on James Gibbs' St Martin-in-the-Fields, London. Built as a chapel of St Peter's Collegiate Church, Wolverhampton by an act of Parliament, the Wolverhampton Chapel Act 1755 (28 Geo. 2. c. 34). There is some uncertainty as to whom the architect was, but there is no doubt that the main contractor was William Baker, who was helped by the local builder and architect, Roger Eykyn. Traditionally the design of the church has been credited to the Shrewsbury architect Thomas Farnolls Pritchard, but it could be that he supervised the construction for Baker.
- Seighford, Staffordshire. Tower and Nave rebuilt. Metal framed gothic windows. Brick pilasters with ?mock artillery slits, which also appear on the crenellations of the tower; which is surmounted by four corner pinnacles. Looks like a very early attempt to re-create German Brick Gothic

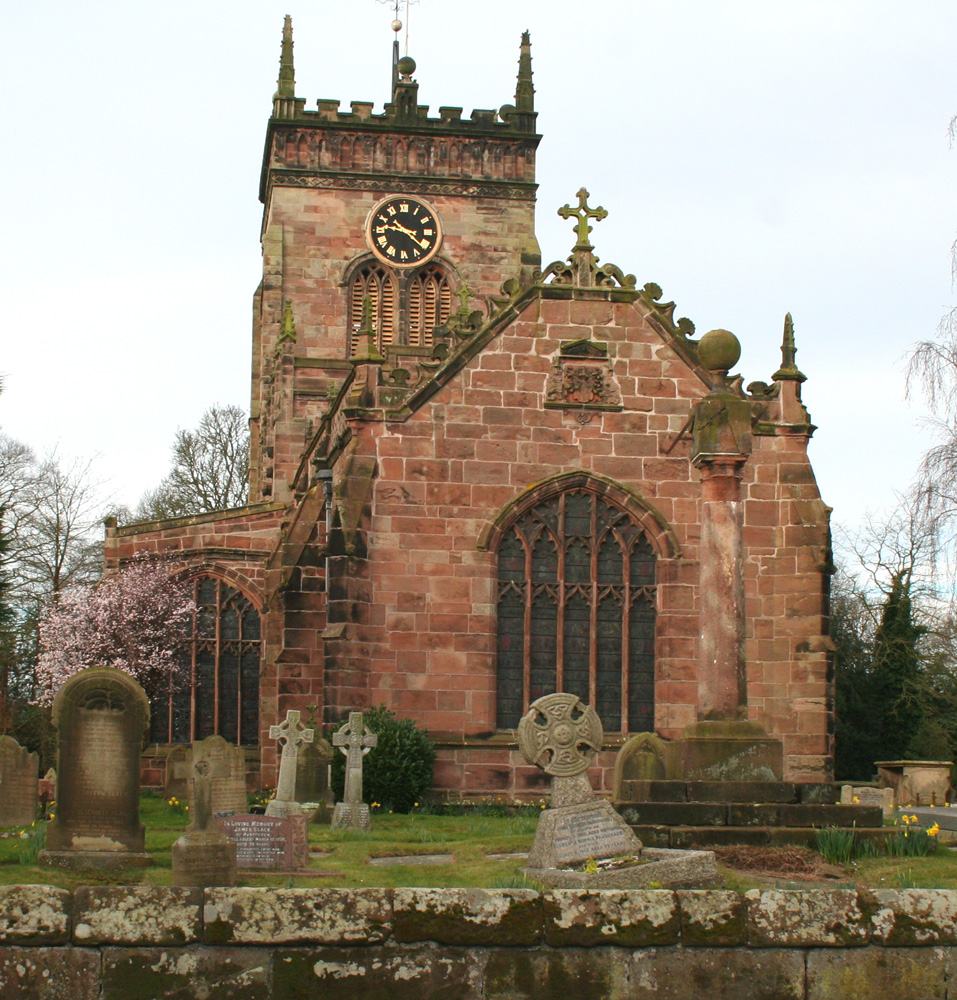
Acton church (west view), Cheshire. Rebuilt by Baker 1758

- Ellenhall, Staffordshire 1757. £1023 estimated for the repair of the Church.
- St Mary's Church, Acton, near Nantwich, Cheshire. Upper part of the tower was blown into Nave, March 1757. Sandstone. The church must have been extensively re-built and the Medieval entrance has been altered and embellished. Remarkable ornamented west gable to Chancel. Ornamentation to tower below parapet, which has ‘gun slits’ in the crenulations (cf Seigford). Four crocketed corner pinnacles with lower mid-ball pinnacles on tower. Sundial surmounted with Baker's typical ball pinnacle.
- St Chad's Church, Wybunbury, Cheshire. Tower leaning as the result of subsidence. Baker appears to have solved the problem, but the Nave and Chancel had to be demolished in 1970.
- Plans for a Kirk in Gothic style at Kenmore Perthshire 1760.
- Upper Penn church, nr Wolverhampton.1765. Baker cased the tower in brickwork. Crenulations to the parapet of tower with four crocketed corner pinnacles. Ornamented gothic tower window.

=== Houses ===
Most of these are recorded architectural drawings and surveys, and it is not clear to what extent Baker's work was carried out.

- Ludlow 52 Broad Street
- Wolverhampton Penn Hall
- North Claines, Worcestershire. Bevere House 1748–1749
- Morville Hall, Shropshire. Addition of two wings.
- Liverpool. Houses in Hanover Street.1748. Demolished.
- Mawley Hall, Shropshire. Possible work to stables 1748.
- Ranton Abbey Staffordshire. Surveyed 1748–1742. Gutted c1940.
- Powis Castle Montgomeryshire Unspecified work 1748–1754
- Oakly Park, Bromfield. Alterations 1748–1758

Wingerworth Hall. Work undertaken by Baker in 1753–1754.

- Enville Staffordshire,"Lady Dorothy's Cottage" For the Earl of Stamford 1748–50
- Morville, Aldenham House, Shropshire. Stable Block 1750–1751
- Tixall Hall Staffordshire. 1750–1751. Demolished c. 1925.
- Darlaston Hall, Staffordshire. Plans for a house. Demolished 1953.
- Acton Burnell Hall, Shropshire 1753–1758
- Wood Eaton, Staffordshire The Hall Farmhouse. 1753–1756.
- Wingerworth Hall, Derbyshire. Work undertaken 1753–1754. Demolished c.1930.
- Stoke on Tern, Shropshire, Woodhouse Farm, 1754–1758. An example of Baker's smaller brick houses, with central chimney stack. Each face of the house has a forward central bay, with doorway with a castellated or crenelated, pediment or parapet.<ref`>Mercer E "English Architecture to 1900: The Shropshire Experience" Logaston Press, 2003.201</ref>
- Swynnerton Hall, Staffordshire. Outbuildings. 1754.
- Patshull House, Staffordshire. 1754–1758. Baker completed the work of James Gibbs, who died in 1754. This included the flanking pavilions, and forecourt, with gateway and stables.
- Hankelow Hall, Cheshire Alterations. 1755–1757.
- Egginton Hall, Derbyshire. Alterations. 1755–1757.
- Terrick Hall, Whitchurch. Plan 1756.
- Whitmore Hall, Staffordshire. Survey 1765.

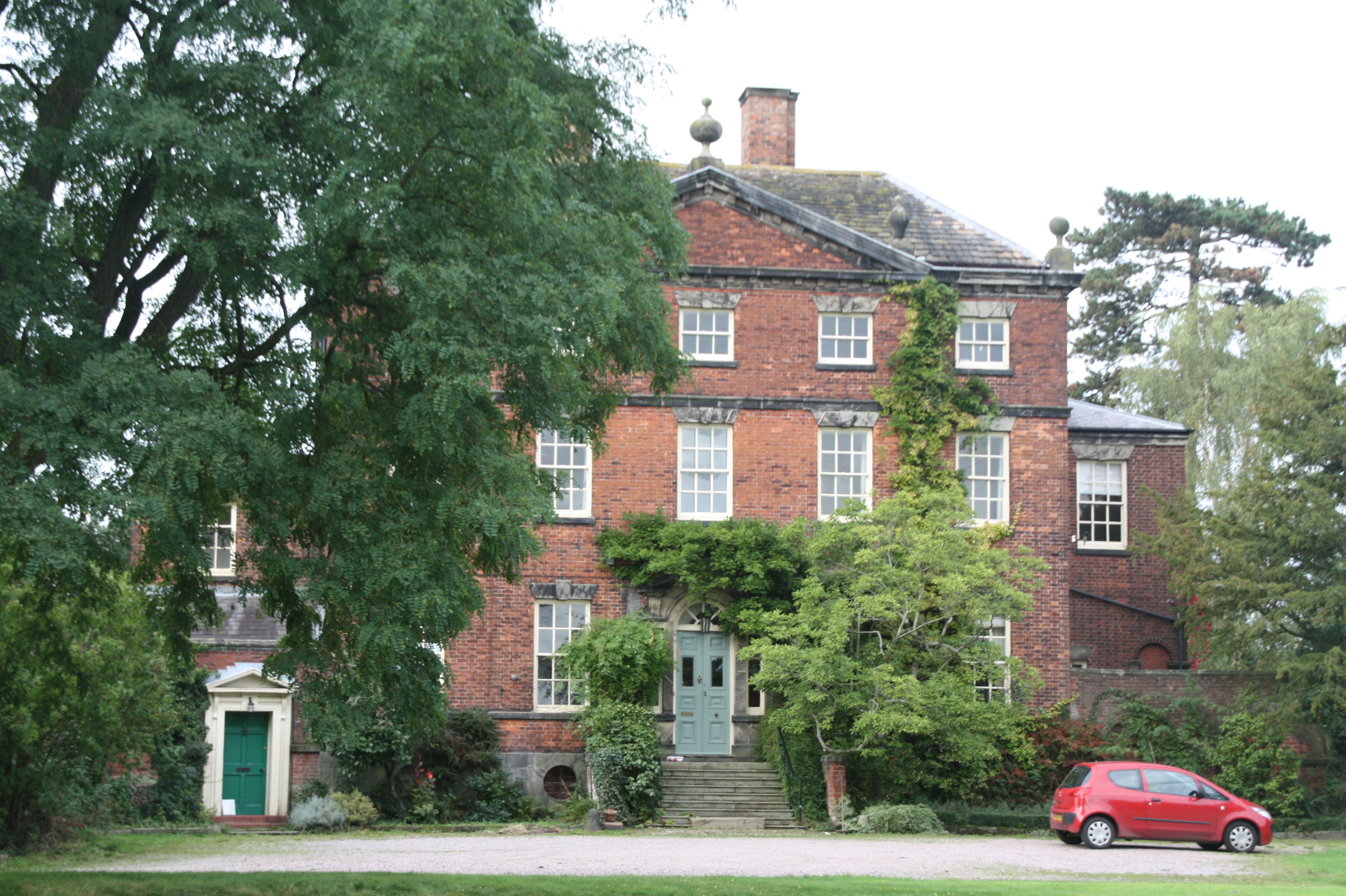
Astbury Rectory, Astbury, Cheshire Possibly refronted by Baker 1757–9.

- Brand Hall, Norton in Hales, Shropshire 1756. Minor Alterations.
- Hanmer Hall, Wrexham. Additional building. 1756.
- Astbury Rectory, Cheshire. Alterations 1757–1759. Typical ball pinnacles on parapet.
- Keele Hall, Staffordshire. Alterations 1757–1759.
- Dorfold Hall, Cheshire. Alterations 1757–1759.
- Woodhouse or Wodehouse nr Wombourne, Staffordshire. Stable block. 1758–1759.
- Sidway Hall near Maer, Staffordshire. Altered or rebuilt 1758–1759.
- Teddesley Hall, Penkridge, Staffordshire. Possible wings, c1759, demolished 1954.

Houses attributed on stylistic grounds.

- Burnhill Green Farm Patshull
- Woore The Swan Hotel
- Sibdon Carwood, Shropshire. Sibdon Castle,

== Gallery of architectural work ==
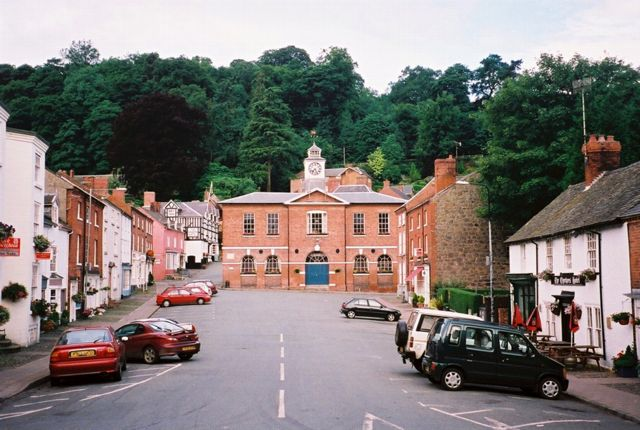
Montgomery Town Hall - William Baker, Architect, altered by Thomas Penson

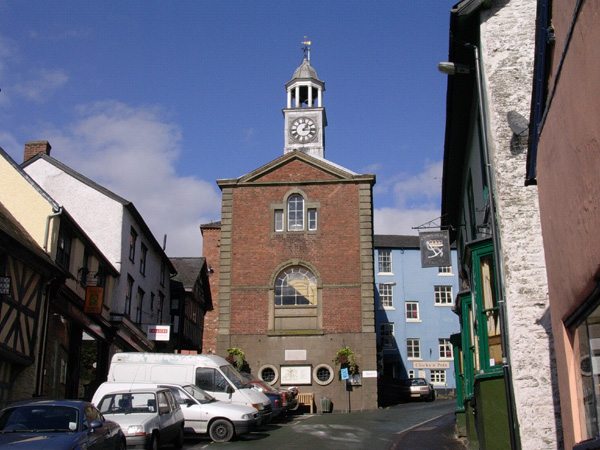
Bishops Castle Town Hall, Probably by William Baker c1745-50.

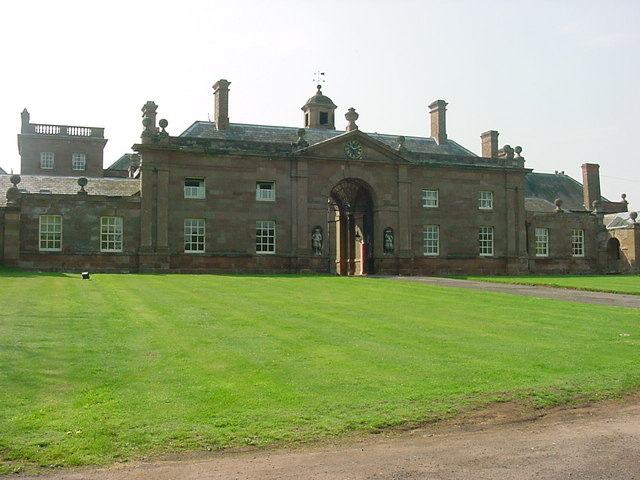
Patshull Hall - Burnhill Green, Nr Pattingham. Gateway by William Baker after 1754

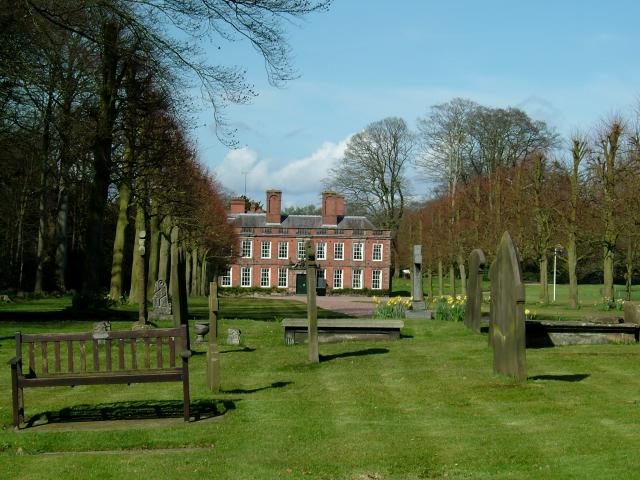
Whitmore Hall. Surveyed by Baker 1765.

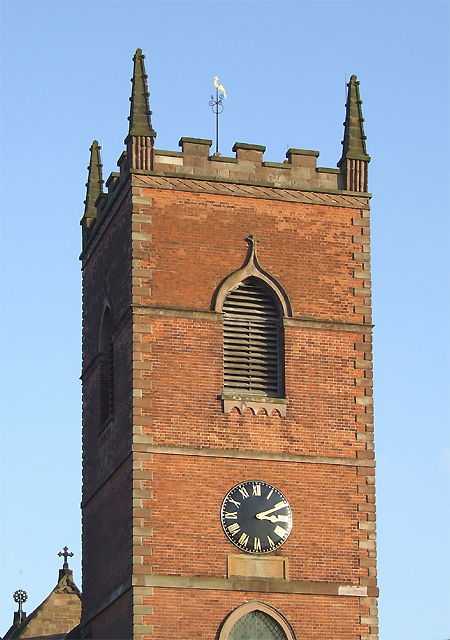
The Tower of Saint Bartholomew's Church, Upper Penn, rebuilt by William Barker in 1765

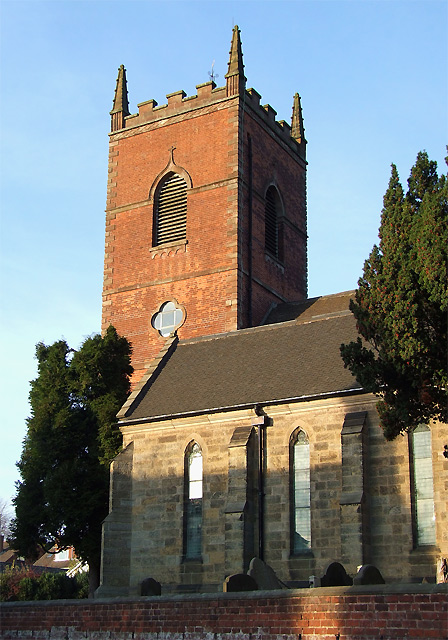
The Church of Saint Bartholomew, Upper Penn, Staffordshire. Tower rebuilt by William Barker in 1765

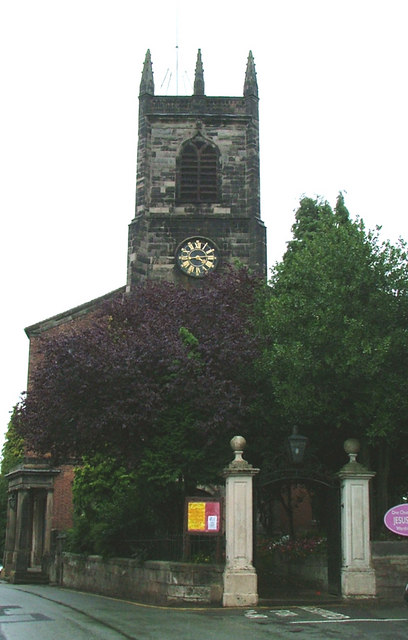
St Peter's Church Congleton

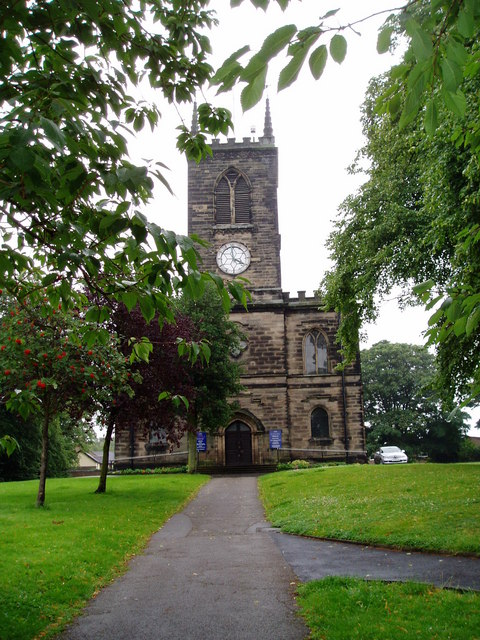
St Michael's Church, Stone

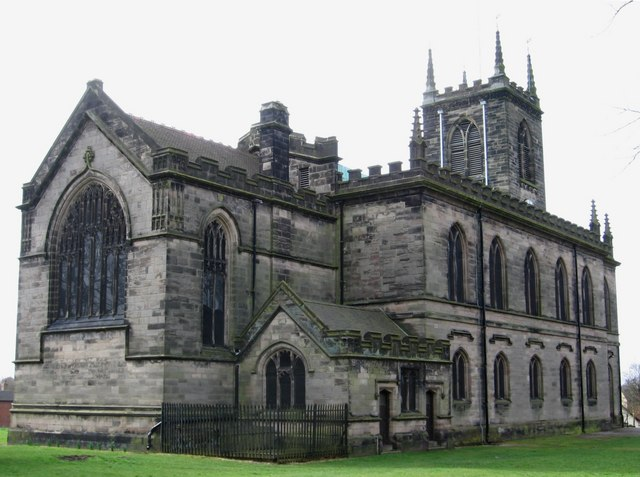
Stone - Church

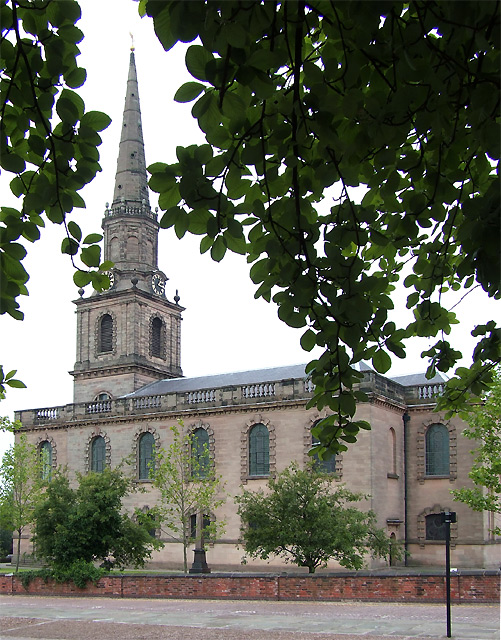
The Church of St. John in the Square, Wolverhampton

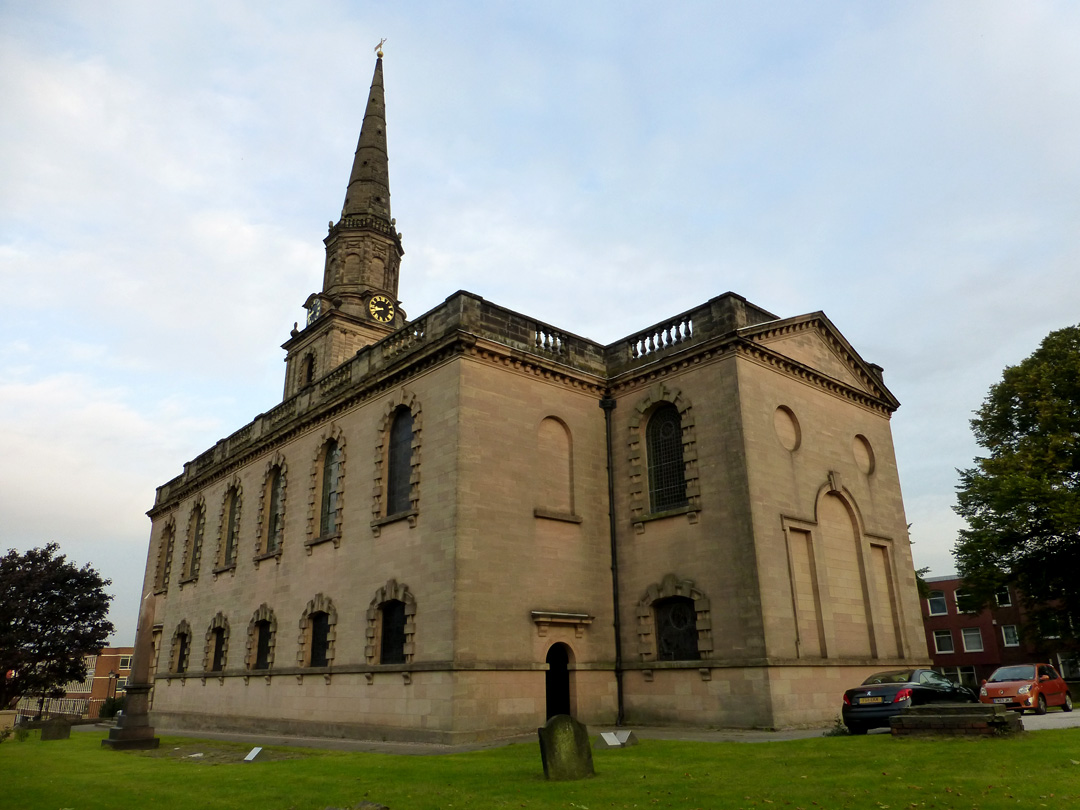
Church of St John, Wolverhampton

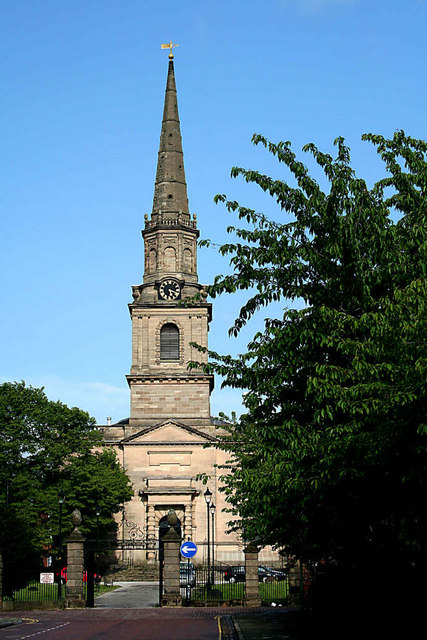
St. John's Church, Wolverhampton

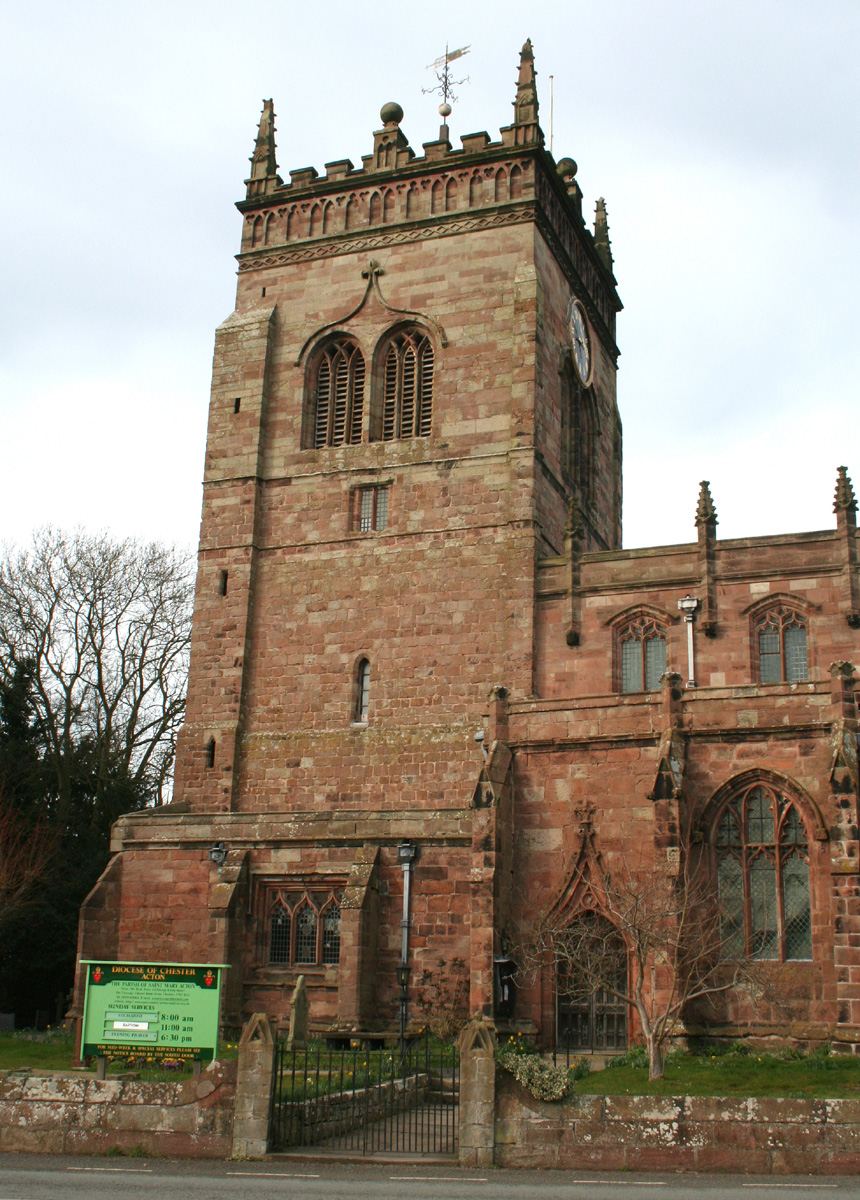
St Marys Acton Cheshire tower

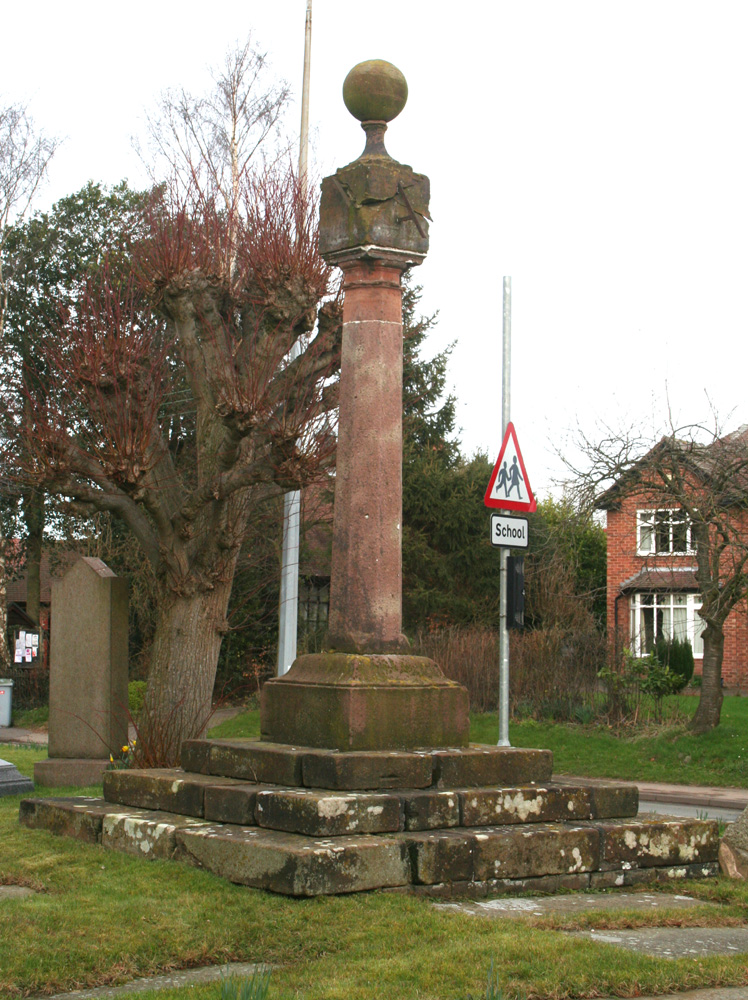
Sundial Acton churchyard

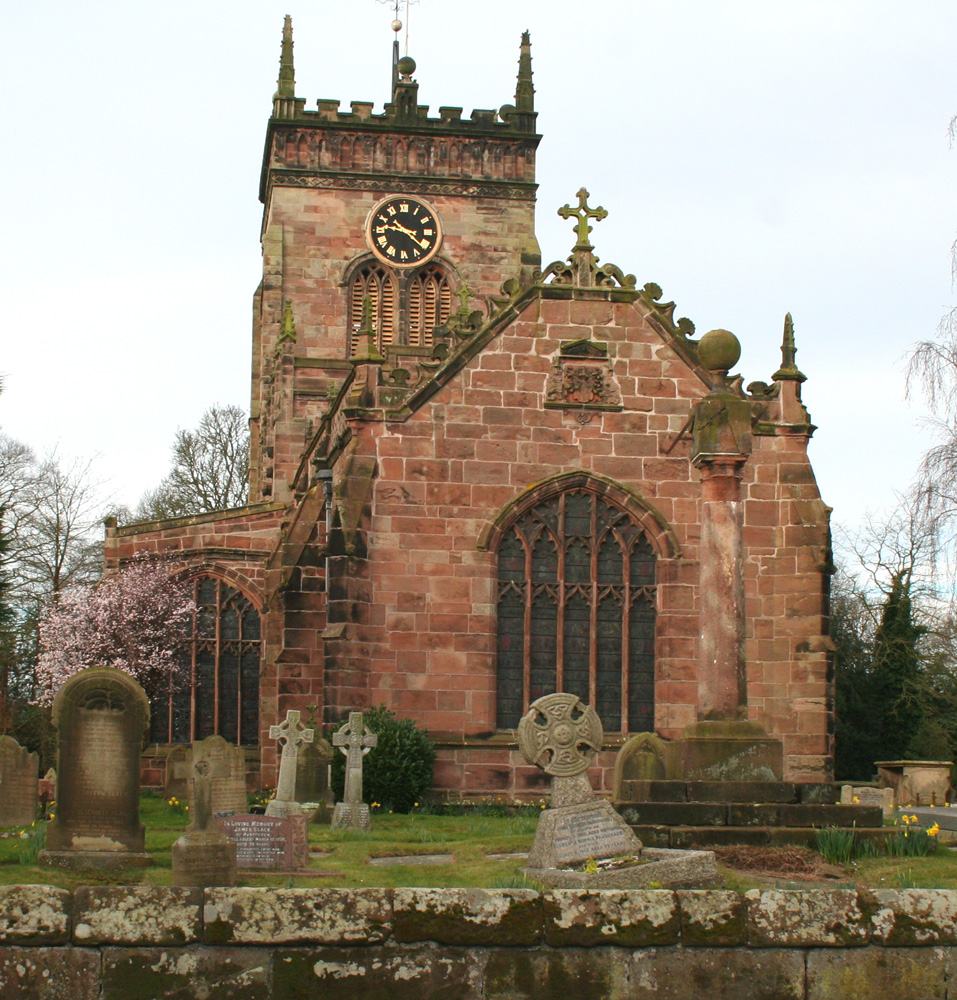
Acton church (west view), Cheshire

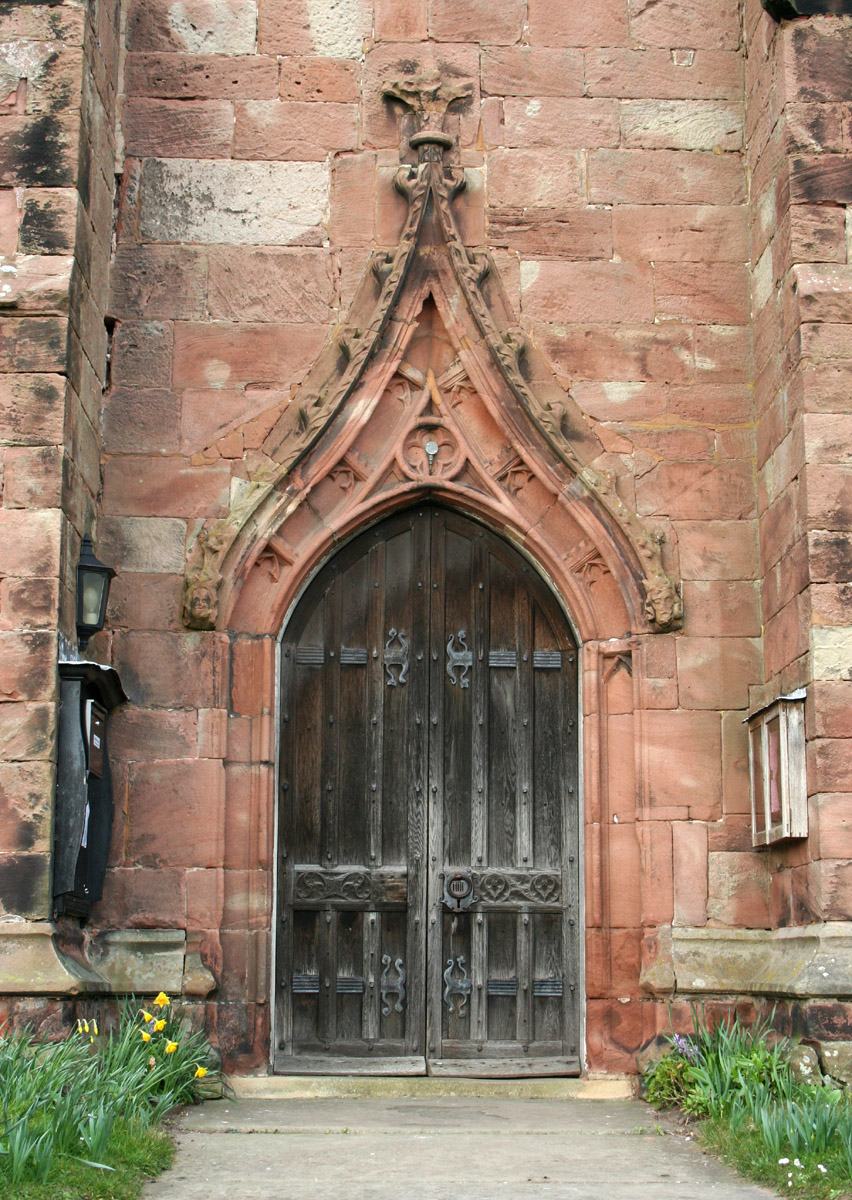
St Marys Acton Cheshire door

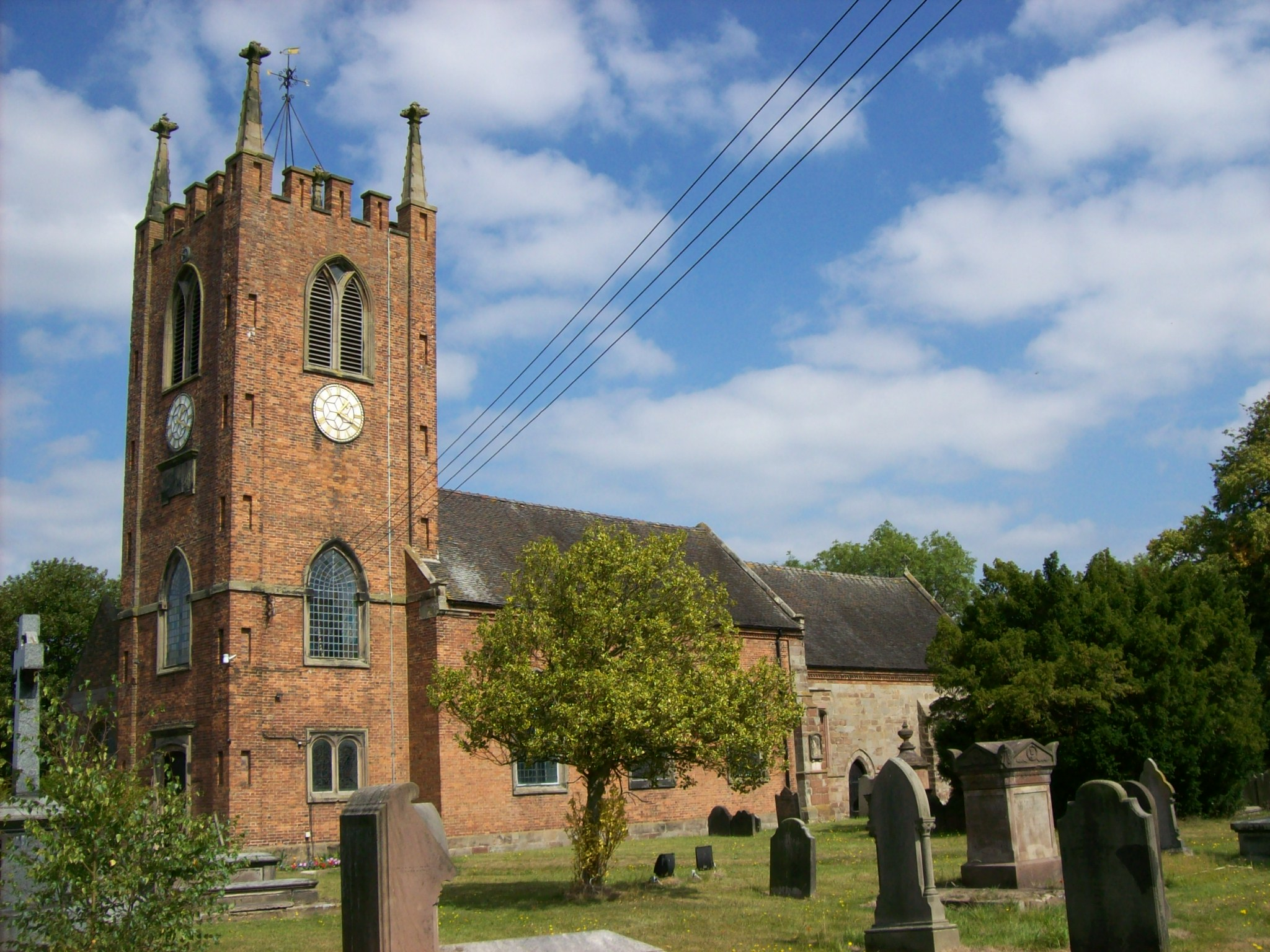
St Chad, Seighford

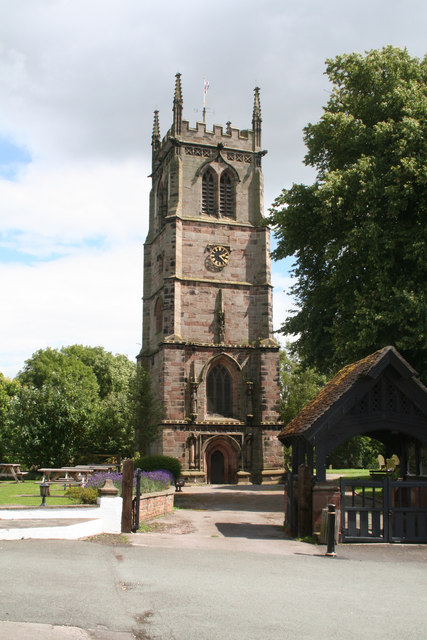
Wybunbury, Tower of St. Chad's Church

== Literature ==
- Colvin H. A Biographical Dictionary of British Architects 1600–1840 Yale University Press, 4th edition London, 2008.
- Ionides J. "Thomas Farnolls Pritchard of Shrewsbury, Architect and ‘Inventor of Cast Iron Bridges’". The Dog Rose Press, Ludlow 1999
- Mercer E "English Architecture to 1900: The Shropshire Experience" Logaston Press, 2003.
- R.Morrice ‘The Payment Book of William Baker of Audlem’, in "English Architecture Public and Private: Essays for Kerry Downes" ed Bold & Cheney,1993.
- Reid P "Burke’s and Savills Guide to Country Houses, Vol II, Herefordshire, Shropshire, Warwickshire, Worcestershire" London, 1980, 104–5
- J Newman and N Pevsner "The Buildings of England: Shropshire", Yale 2006.
- J M Robinson "A Guide to the Country Houses of the North-West" Constable, 1991.
