= Sibyl of Falaise =

11th- and 12th-century Anglo-Norman noblewoman

Sibyl of Falaise (or Sibil de Falaise) was a kinswoman of King Henry I of England. She was possibly his illegitimate daughter or a niece, as the sources are unclear. Another possibility is that she may have been more distantly related to him instead. She married and had at least one daughter, although her husband's other children may possibly be her offspring also. Through her daughter, Sibyl was the grandmother of Reginald fitzUrse, one of the murderers of Thomas Becket.

== Life ==
Sibyl was called the "nepta" (either "niece" or "kinswoman") of King Henry I of England. The term "niece" was often used to mean that the person was an illegitimate child rather than a niece, so it is possible that she was really Henry's bastard daughter. The historian Frank Barlow also implies that she could have been Henry's daughter rather than his niece. Against this, Kathleen Thompson argues that Henry was not shy about recognizing his bastards, (Note: Henry had at least 9 illegitimate sons and 14 illegitimate daughters.) and that it is more likely that Sibyl was the illegitimate daughter of Henry's elder brother Robert Curthose. Robert was Duke of Normandy from 1086 (although he pawned it in 1096 to another brother, William Rufus, to finance going on the First Crusade), and Falaise was where Robert's legitimate son, William Clito, was being raised. Katharine Keats-Rohan argues instead that Sibyl was the younger daughter of William de Falaise and Geva de Burcy. William de Falaise was the lord of Stogursey in Somerset. Keats-Rohan says that Sibyl was just a "kinswoman" of Henry and not a bastard of either Henry or Robert. I. J. Sanders does not believe Sibyl was William's daughter, but does not speculate further on her ancestry.

If Sibyl was a bastard, nothing is known of her mother. Thompson speculates that if Sibyl was the daughter of Robert, Sibyl's mother may have been someone employed in raising William Clito and that Sibyl was named for Robert's deceased wife, Sibyl of Conversano.

Sibyl married Baldwin de Boulers (sometimes spelled Bullers), at the instigation of Henry I. Baldwin held lands in Shropshire. Baldwin had at least two sons – Stephen and Baldwin – and two daughters – Matilda (or Maud) and Hillaria. Matilda married Richard fitzUrse, and only she is known for sure to be the daughter of Sibyl. Matilda was the mother of Reginald fitzUrse, one of the murderers of Thomas Becket.
