= Richard fitzUrse =

Anglo-Norman baron (died 1158 to 1166)

Richard FitzUrse
- Died: Between 1158 and 1166
- Occupation: Baron
- Spouse: Matilda
- Children: Reginald, Margery, Mabel

Richard FitzUrse was an Anglo-Norman nobleman and feudal baron of Bulwick in Northamptonshire.

Richard may have been the son of Richard FitzUrse, who was married to the widow of Richard Ingaine. Richard may have been the grandson of Urso de Berseres. Other sources give Richard's father as Urse, who held lands in the hundred of Corby in Northamptonshire.

Richard in 1130 was in control of the honour of Bulwick in Northamptonshire. By holding the honour, he is considered to be the first feudal baron of Bulwick.

Richard supported King Stephen of England during the civil war between Stephen and his cousin Empress Matilda over the English throne. Richard was a witness to a charter of Stephen's issued right before the Battle of Lincoln. Richard was captured along with King Stephen during the battle.

Richard married Matilda, daughter of Baldwin de Boulers and Sibyl de Falaise. From the marriage, Richard acquired Worspring and Williton in Somerset. Matilda and Richard had one son, Reginald, and two daughters – Margery and Mabel. Margery married twice – first to Richard Engaine and second to Geoffrey Brito. Mabel was the mother of Roger Gernet.

Richard died sometime after 1158, but before 1166. His heir was his son Reginald. Reginald was one of the four murderers of Thomas Becket.
