= Montgomeryshire County War Memorial =

War memorial in Montgomery, Powys, Wales

Coordinates: 52.55368°N 3.15767°W

The Montgomeryshire County War Memorial, located on the summit of Town Hill, south-west of the town of Montgomery, stands tribute to commemorate those from Montgomeryshire (a historic county of Wales) who have been killed in all past wars. It was originally constructed to honour those having died in the First World War, but has since been rededicated.

Built in form of a Doric column from Portland stone, the memorial was completed in 1923 and is just over 20 feet tall. The memorial can be reached by taking a footpath opposite the entrance to Montgomery Castle Car Park. The trail continues uphill along a dirt track, eventually leading to a level grassland where the monument can be seen in the distance.

The Memorial's initial inscription reads in English: "To the glorious memory of the brave men of Montgomeryshire who fell in the great war 1914–1919", with a Welsh translation on another side. Supplemental inscriptions to those who 'gave their lives' in the Second World War were added later.

It is a listed building.

270° panorama at the site of the Montgomeryshire War Memorial, Montgomery, Wales, as seen at dusk on a stormy October evening. Sheep graze on nearby hillsides; small farms and villages are visible all around.
