= Bowdler =

Bowdler is a prominent family from Shropshire in England, descended from Baldwin de Boulers.

== People with the given name Bowdler ==
- George Bowdler Buckton (1818–1905), English entomologist
- Richard Bowdler Sharpe (1847–1909), English zoologist

== People with the surname Bowdler ==
=== Writers ===
- Elizabeth Stuart Bowdler (? - 1797), English religious writer
- Henrietta Maria Bowdler (1750–1830), writer and expurgator of Shakespeare, sister of Jane, John and Thomas Bowdler
- Jane Bowdler (1743–1784), poet and essayist and sister of John, Thomas and Henrietta Bowdler
- John Bowdler (1746–1823), moral reformer and brother of Henrietta and Thomas Bowdler
- John Bowdler the Younger (1783–1815), essayist, poet and lawyer, son of John Bowdler
- Thomas Bowdler (1754–1825), English physician, publisher and editor of the Family Shakespeare (1818), inspiration of the term bowdlerisation
- Thomas Bowdler the Younger (1782–1856), Church of England priest and nephew and editor of Thomas Bowdler

=== Sportsmen ===
- Cal Bowdler (born 1977), retired American basketball player
- Charles Bowdler (1785–1879), English cricketer
- Ernie Bowdler (1872–1921), Shrewsbury Town F.C. and Wales international footballer
- Jack Bowdler (1870–1927), Shrewsbury Town F.C., Wolverhampton Wanderers F.C. and Wales international footballer
- Lonza Bowdler, Welsh international rugby player

=== Politicians ===
- Audley Bowdler (1884–1969), English politician
- William G. Bowdler (1924–2016), American diplomat

=== Other ===
- Emily Mary Bowdler Sharpe (1868–1920), English entomologist
- Sandra Bowdler (1946), Australian archaeologist

== Places ==
- Ashford Bowdler, a village in Shropshire, England
  - Ashford Bowdler railway station, railway station in Ashford Bowdler
- Hope Bowdler, a village in Shropshire, England

== See also ==
- Hen Domen the Bowdler family seat
