= Montgomery Town Hall =

Municipal Building in Montgomery, Wales

- Neuadd y Dref Trefaldwyn (Welsh)
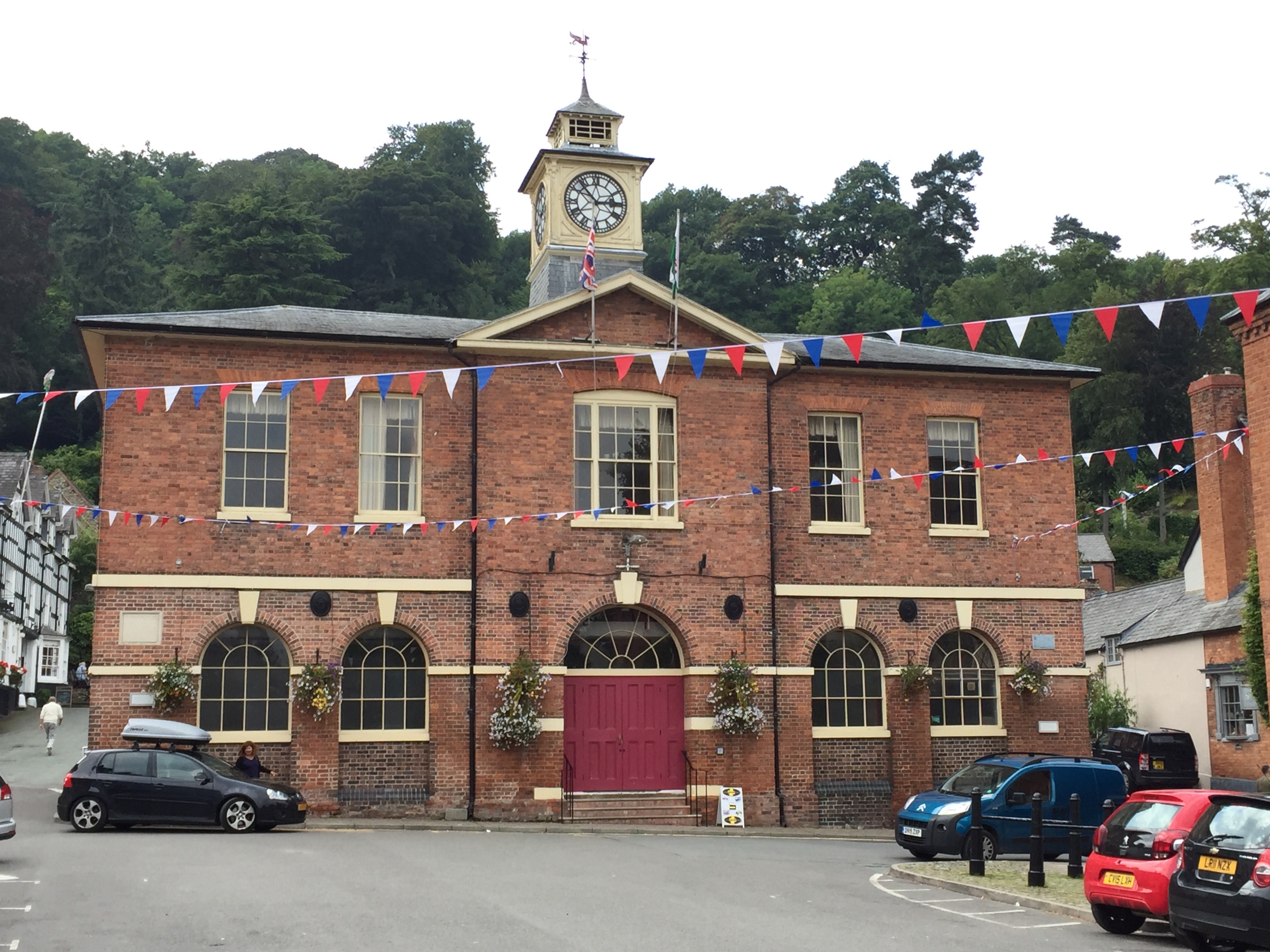
- Montgomery Town Hall

- Shown in Powys
- 52.5603°N 3.1488°W
- Location: Broad Street, Montgomery

History
- Built: 1751

Site notes
- Architect: William Baker of Audlem
- Architectural style: Neoclassical style

Listed Building – Grade II*
- Official name: The Town Hall
- Designated: 19 July 1950
- Reference no.: 7974

Montgomery Town Hall (Welsh: Neuadd y Dref Trefaldwyn) is a municipal building in Broad Street, Montgomery, Wales. It served as the meeting place of Montgomery Borough Council and is a Grade II* listed building.

== History ==
The first town hall in Montgomery was a medieval half-timbered structure, which a map drawn by the cartographer, John Speed, in 1610 shows was sited in the middle of Broad Street. In the mid-18th century, the Custos Rotulorum of Montgomeryshire, Henry Herbert, 1st Earl of Powis, proposed demolishing the old building and replacing it. The new building was designed by William Baker of Audlem in the neoclassical style, built in red brick with stone dressings, and was completed in 1751.

The design involved a symmetrical main frontage with five bays facing east down Broad Street, although the centre of the building was offset to the line of the street. The building was arcaded on the ground floor, so that markets could be held. The central bay, which slightly projected forward, featured a large window on the first floor with a pediment above, and the outer bays also had windows on the first floor. Internally, the principal room was the main assembly room on the first floor, which was equipped with a wooden sprung dance floor. The room was used from an early stage for hearings of the court of quarter sessions.

In 1828 the building was re-modelled to a design by the county surveyor, Thomas Penson; the work, which was carried out at the expense of the Lord Lieutenant of Montgomeryshire, Edward Clive, 1st Earl of Powis, involved raising the roof level and extending the building to the rear. The borough council was reformed under the Municipal Corporations Act 1883. By that time, the town hall was owned by the corporation, rather than by the Earls of Powys.

In 1900, the arcading was infilled with glazing and, in the case of the central bay, with a wooden panelled doorway. In 1921, a clock tower, which was intended to commemorate the life of the former High Sheriff of Montgomeryshire, Alderman Nicholas Watson Fairles-Humphreys, was installed on the roof.

The town hall continued to serve as the main meeting place of the borough council but ceased to be used in that way when the enlarged Montgomeryshire District Council was formed at Newtown in 1974. Improvements were made to the configuration of the ground floor in spring 2009, and a further programme of works, together with the installation of a lift, was carried out in summer 2019.

== See also ==
- Grade II* listed buildings in Powys
