= Charles Bowdler =

English cricketer

Charles Bowdler (c. 1785 – 24 September 1879) was an English cricketer associated with Surrey who was active in the 1800s. He is recorded in one match in 1809, totalling nine runs with a highest score of seven.

== Bibliography ==
- Haygarth, Arthur (1996) [1862]. Scores & Biographies, Volume 1 (1744–1826). Kennington: Frederick Lillywhite. ISBN 978-19-00592-23-9.
