= The Old Bell Museum =

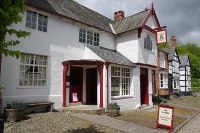
- Interactive map of the The Old Bell Museum area

General information
- Type: Museum, inn
- Location: 3-5 Arthur Street, Montgomery, Powys, Wales
- Coordinates: 52°33′38″N 3°08′56″W
- Owner: Montgomery Civic Society

Technical details
- Material: Half-timbered

Website
- www.oldbellmuseum.org.uk

The Old Bell Museum is a former 16th-century inn, converted into a museum and run by volunteers from the Montgomery Civic Society of Powys. The half-timbered building contains eleven rooms of various local exhibits, including information on the architecture of the building itself. Originally opened as the Old Bell Hotel, it served as a temperance hotel catering to teetotal visitors visiting Montgomery

The Old Bell Museum was awarded "Accredited Museum" status by the Museums, Libraries and Archives Council of Wales (MLA) in February 2009 and re-accredited in 2013.
