= Montgomery, Powys =

Town in Powys, Wales

Montgomery: Welsh: Trefaldwyn
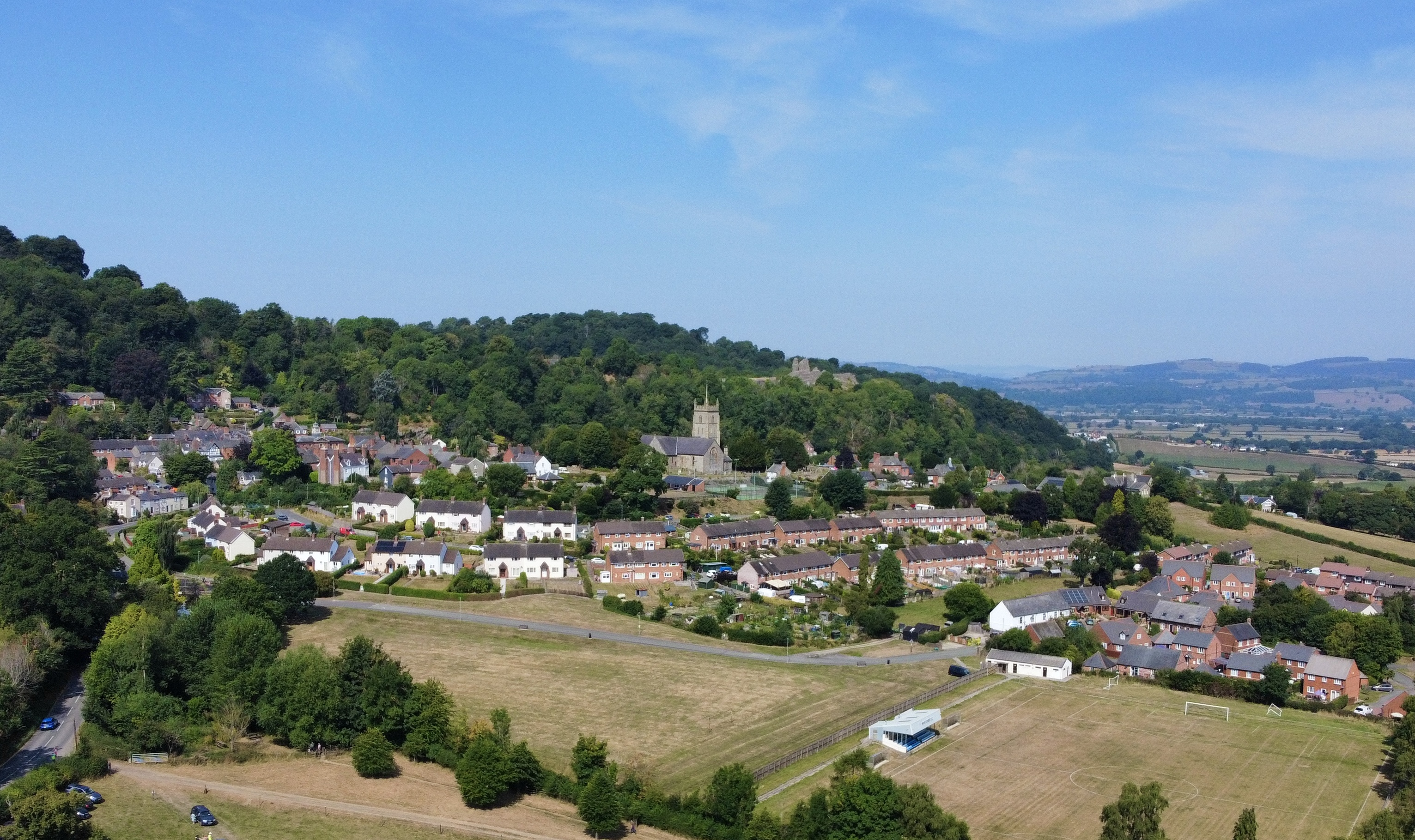
- View of Montgomery with Montgomery Castle in the background

- Location within Powys
- Population: 1,295 (2011 census)
- OS grid reference: SO221967
- Principal area: Powys
- Country: Wales
- Sovereign state: United Kingdom
- Post town: MONTGOMERY
- Postcode district: SY15
- Dialling code: 01686
- Police: Dyfed-Powys
- Fire: Mid and West Wales
- Ambulance: Welsh
- UK Parliament: Montgomeryshire and Glyndŵr
- Senedd Cymru – Welsh Parliament: Montgomeryshire
- List of places UK Wales Powys 52.563°N 3.148°W Community map: Map of the community

Montgomery (Welsh: Trefaldwyn; translates as the town of Baldwin) is a town and community in Powys, Wales. It is the traditional county town of the historic county of Montgomeryshire to which it gives its name, and it is within the Welsh Marches border area. The town centre lies about 1 mile (1.6 km) west of the England–Wales border. Montgomery Castle was started in 1223 and its parish church in 1227. Other locations in the town include The Old Bell Museum, the Offa's Dyke Path, the Robber's Grave and the town wall. The large Iron Age hill fort of Ffridd Faldwyn is sited northwest of the town and west of the Castle.

In the 2011 census, the community of Montgomery had a population of 1,295. The community includes Hen Domen.

== History ==
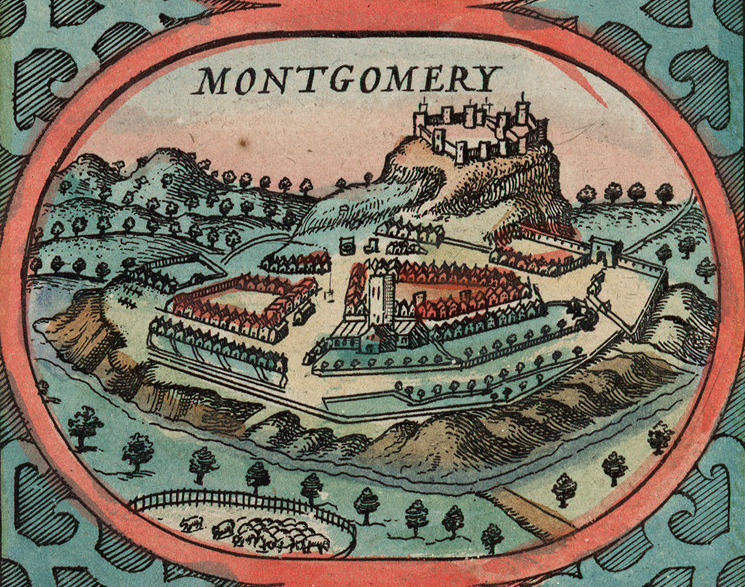
Montgomery from John Speed's map of Wales (1610)

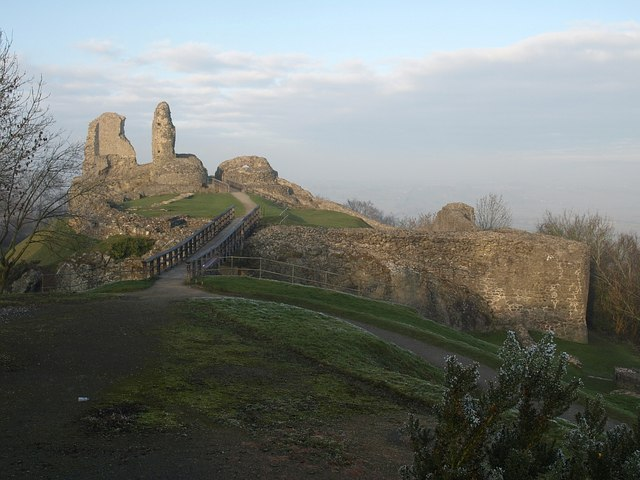
Montgomery Castle from the south

The town was established around a Norman stone castle on a crag on the western edge of the Vale of Montgomery. The castle had been built in the early 13th century to control an important ford over the nearby River Severn and replaced an earlier motte and bailey fortification at Hen Domen, one mile away. An important supporter of King William I (the Conqueror), Roger de Montgomery, originally from Sainte-Foy-de-Montgommery in the Pays d'Auge in Normandy, was given this part of the Welsh Marches by William and his name was given to the town surrounding the castle.

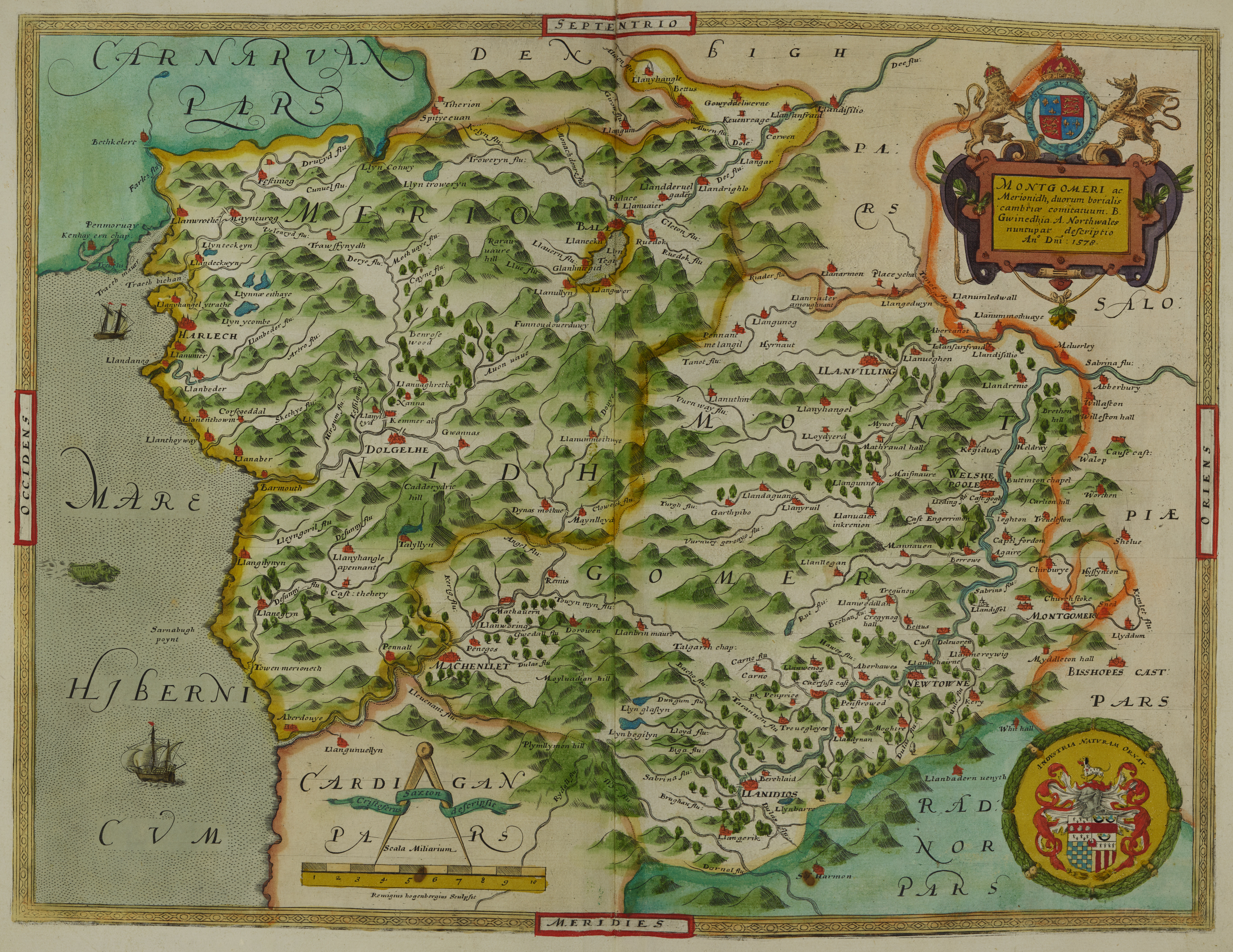
Hand-drawn map of Montgomery and Merioneth by Christopher Saxton from 1578

The Treaty of Montgomery was signed 29 September 1267 in Montgomeryshire. By this treaty King Henry III of England acknowledged Llywelyn ap Gruffudd as Prince of Wales. Montgomery was sacked at the beginning of the 15th century by the Welsh Prince Owain Glyndŵr. At that time, the castle and surrounding estates were held by the Mortimer family (the hereditary Earls of March) but they came into royal hands when the last Earl of March died in 1425. In 1485, King Richard III was defeated at the Battle of Bosworth and the Royal Estates, including Montgomery and its castle, passed into the hands of the new King, Henry VII, the first Tudor king, and a Welshman. The castle was then given to another powerful Welsh family, the Herberts. One of their descendants, religious poet George Herbert was born in Montgomery in 1593.

During the Civil War, the castle was captured by Parliamentary forces and subsequently slighted to remove its military threat.

As a county town, Montgomery prospered, and its buildings give the small town its current character.

In 1923 the Montgomeryshire County War Memorial was completed to commemorate fallen servicemen from Montgomeryshire. The memorial is on a hill about 1 km SW of the town.

== Governance ==
Montgomery Town Council represents the community at the local level, with eight town councillors.

Until 2022 Montgomery was also an electoral ward for Powys County Council, electing one county councillor for the ward. Sitting councillor, Stephen Hayes, successfully defended his seat at the May 2017 elections.

As a result of the Review of Electoral Arrangements - County of Powys proposals, Montgomery ward was combined with neighbouring Forden, to create a Forden and Montgomery ward with a population of over 2,000. This came into effect at the 2022 elections. Green Party candidate, Jeremy Thorp, won the seat at the 2022 Powys Council election.

== St Nicholas Parish Church ==
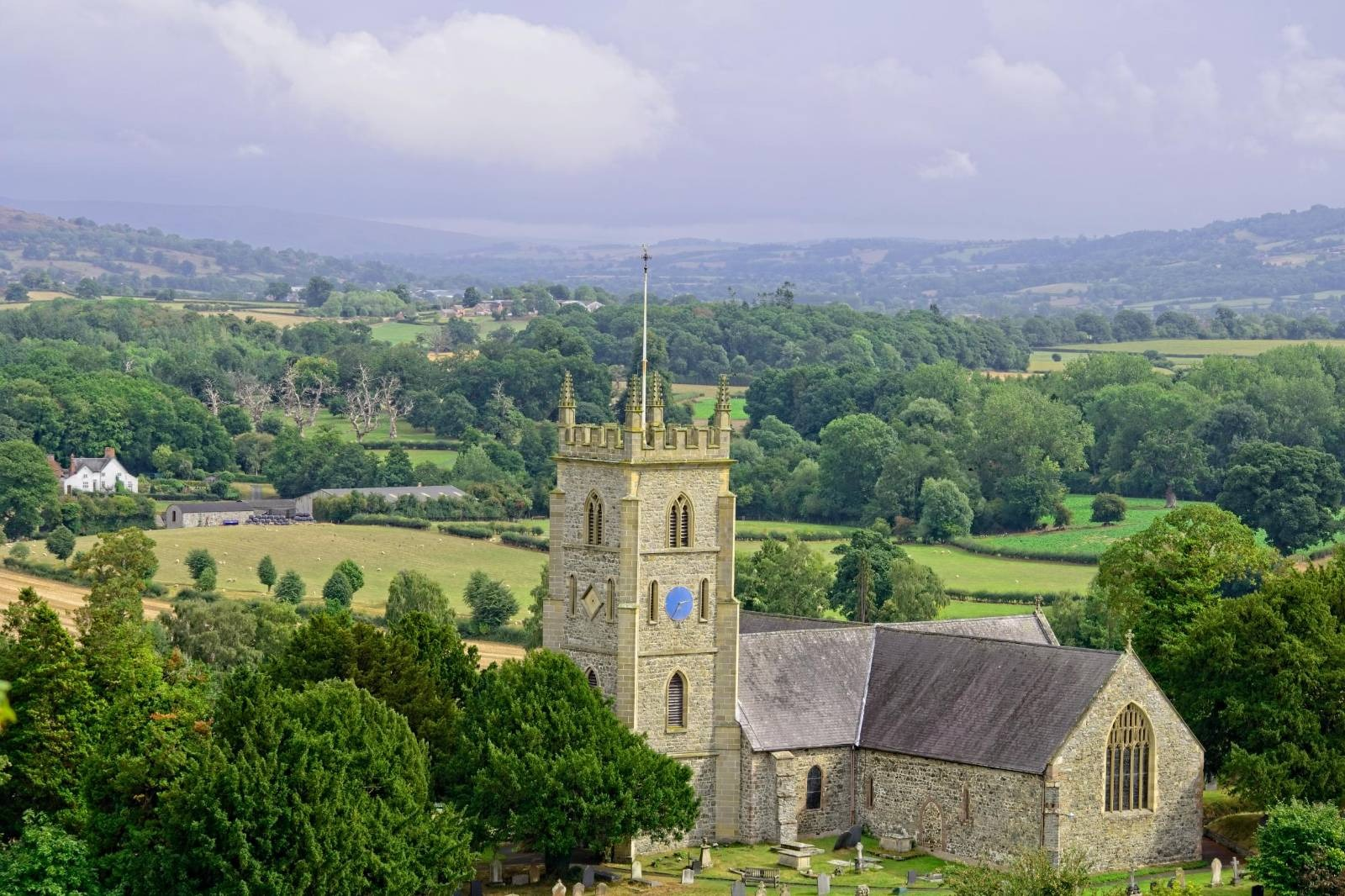
View of St Nicholas's Church from the nearby Montgomery Castle

The parish church was founded in the 1220s, with later additions including late 13th-century chancel and transepts and a 19th-century tower. The church is Grade I listed. Perhaps the most remarkable features of the church are the ornate rood screen, misericords and stalls which were transferred to the church from Chirbury Priory in Shropshire after the Dissolution of the Monasteries in the 16th century. The south transept shows evidence of Montgomery's close association with the Herbert family. The centrepiece is the Elizabethan era tomb or church monument to Richard Herbert (died 1596) of Montgomery Castle, father of poet and Anglican divine George Herbert. This association is recalled in a memorial poem to a well-known local man J. D. K. Lloyd, who wrote this poem after the style of George Herbert.

This O, enclosed around, smoothe, with no entrance found, yet soone with newest life to overflow So has thy tombe, by Pilate sealed, to us that third day Life revealed, O grant that I, some morning bright, my earthly Shell, then broke, may wear, in White, Thy Yoke.

Richard's grandson, another Richard Herbert, 2nd Baron Herbert of Chirbury, the last Herbert to have lived at Montgomery Castle, was buried in the church in 1655.

=== Churchyard and Robber's Grave ===
In 1821 John Davies of Wrexham was sentenced to death by hanging at Montgomery for highway robbery. Throughout his trial, and after the sentence, Davies declared his innocence and prayed that God would not allow the grass to grow on his grave for a hundred years as a sign of his innocence. His grave remained bare for at least a century, giving birth to the legend of the Robber's grave. The grave (now grassed) can still be seen in the churchyard. Besides the legendary Robber's Grave, the churchyard also contains the war graves of two soldiers of World War I and a soldier and two airmen of World War II.

== The Town Hall ==
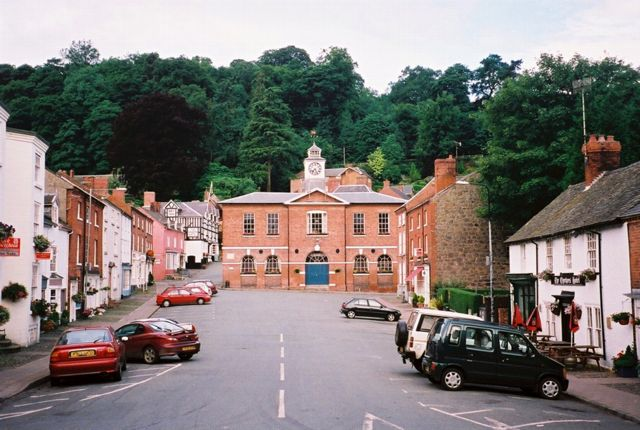
Montgomery Town Hall, Broad Street

The last remaining Georgian town hall in Montgomeryshire, Montgomery Town Hall forms a striking termination to Broad Street, although the centre of the building is offset from the line of the street. Built by William Baker of Audlem, 1748–51, for Henry Herbert, 1st Earl of Powis, for whom Baker had also in 1745 provided designs for a new Town Hall at Bishop's Castle. In 1828 Thomas Penson, at the expense of Edward Clive, 1st Earl of Powis, raised the roof level over the first floor. The clock tower was added in 1921. The predecessor of this building was probably a half-timbered structure, which the Speed map of 1610 shows was sited, lengthways, in the middle of Broad Street.

== The Old County Gaol ==
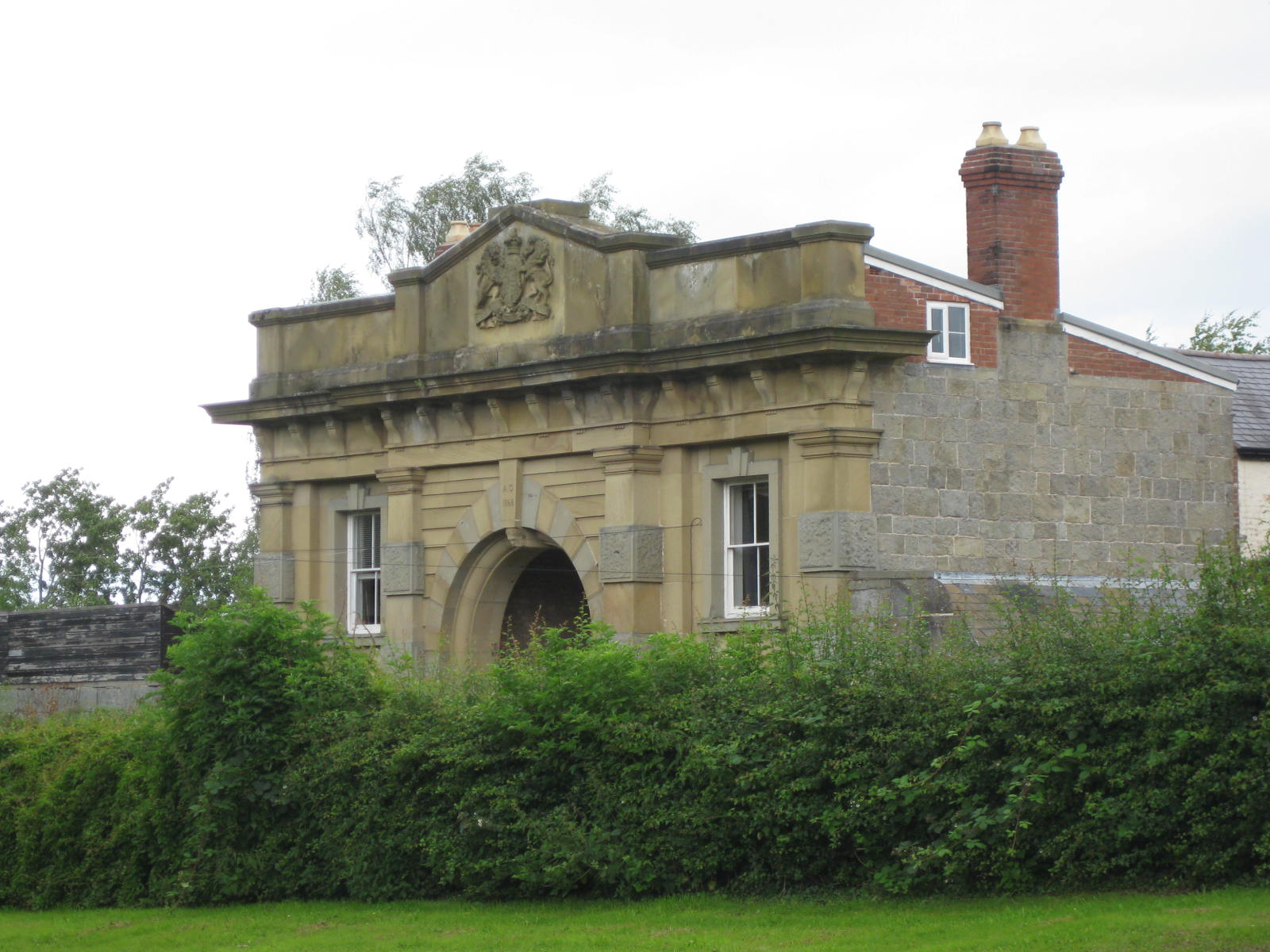
Gatehouse, Old Gaol, Montgomery

The former Montgomeryshire County Gaol that once stood at the end of Gaol Road was designed by Thomas Penson, the county surveyor, and built of brick faced with stone, c 1830–32. The tall octagonal governor's house, with the chapel above, was at the centre of four radiating two- and three-storey wings. One of the yards was fitted with a treadmill. The gatehouse was built into the wall to face a new approach in 1866 by J.W. Poundley; powerful ashlar triumphal arch with four giant semi-rusticated pilasters.

The gaol was closed in 1878 and all that now remains, apart from the gatehouse, is the Governor's House and the high wall of one cell block.

== Montgomery Primary School ==
Formerly the National School of 1864. The school was built by the architect Thomas Nicholson on land donated by Lord Powis and financed by the then Rector and the Hereford Diocesan Board of Education as well as many smaller gifts. Stone, many-gabled gothic with splay-footed buttresses, well designed and detailed. Master's house to left and gabled school building to right, and a wing beyond. The assembly hall was added in 1952 by Herbert Carr, the Montgomeryshire county architect.

The school is under the control of Powys County Council and is an important feature of community life. It remains a Christian school in the diocese of St. Asaph.

== The Old Bell Museum ==
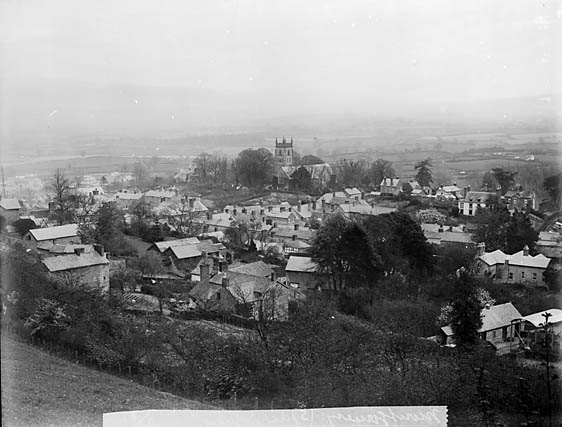
South view of Montgomery (1885)

The Old Bell Museum is a former 16th-century inn. It has been converted into a museum.

== Sport ==
Montgomery Town play in the Ardal Leagues North East division, Tier 3 of the Welsh football pyramid.

== Railways ==
The Cambrian Coast Line passes the currently closed Montgomery railway station.

== Culture ==
The town was used for many of the filming locations in Dylan Thomas's 'A Child's Christmas In Wales' TV adaptation 1987. Notable locations are Broad Street, Church Bank and School Bank.

== Notable people ==
- Brothers George Herbert (1593-1633), poet and Anglican divine, Sir Henry Herbert (1594-1673), Master of the Revels, and Thomas Herbert (1597-1642?), naval officer and writer, were all born at Montgomery. Their eldest brother Edward Herbert, 1st Baron Herbert of Chirbury (1583-1648), poet, philosopher and diplomat, inherited and lived at Montgomery Castle until 1644.
- Edwin Hughes (1885-1949), Wales international footballer, played for Wrexham, Nottingham Forest and Manchester City, died in Montgomery.
- Geraint Goodwin (1903-1941), author, settled in Montgomery where he died.
- Julie Christie, actress, lived for a long time on the outskirts of the town. She is reported as saying in 2007 that the closest thing she had to home lay in the remembered magic of the few summers she had shared with her mother in Wales when she first returned from India. So she bought a basic farm near Montgomery, invited some friends to stay with her, which is how she has lived most of her life since.

== See also ==
- Hen Domen The Motte and Bailey castle of Roger de Montgomery of 1070, to the north of Montgomery
- Lymore, Montgomery Park and former timber-framed house of the Herbert family

== Literature ==
- Smith J., (1968) Herbert Correspondence, Board of Celtic Studies, University of Wales Press.
- Scourfield R and Haslam R, (2013) Buildings of Wales: Powys; Montgomeryshire, Radnorshire and Breconshire, 2nd edition, Yale University Press, p. 133-134.
- Ann and John Welton (2003), The Story of Montgomery Logaston Press, 2nd revised edition 2010
