= The Bull Hotel, Ludlow =

Bull Hotel
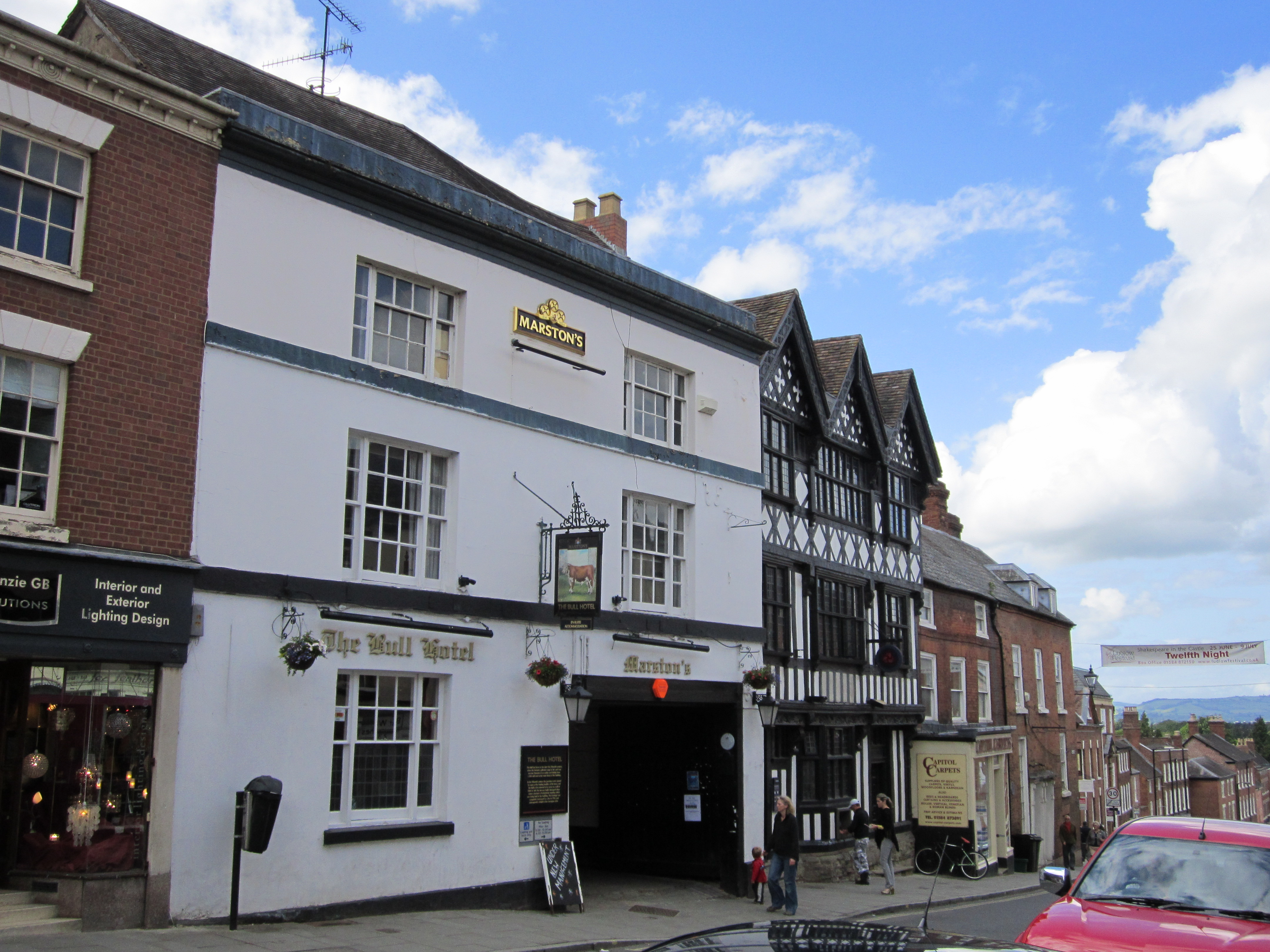

- Location in Shropshire
- 52.3686°N 2.7177°W
- Location: Ludlow, Shropshire, England

Listed Building – Grade II
- Official name: Bull Hotel
- Designated: 15 April 1954
- Reference no.: 1219761

The Bull Hotel is a historic inn in Ludlow, at 14 Bull Ring.

The public house is described as "the best surviving medieval inn in Ludlow" and pre-dates the Feathers Hotel opposite. It is a Grade II listed building. Much of the current three-storey building dates to the 16th century, but the painted stucco front date from the 18th century and the roof tiles from the 20th century.

During the Ludlow Festival in the summer, the hotel hosts the Fringe Festival, featuring live jazz music and plays in the courtyard of the hotel.

== Rivalry with The Feathers ==
On the opposite side of the street is the Feathers Hotel and the two hostelries partake in a tug-of-war competition every Boxing Day across the street itself.

== See also ==
- Listed buildings in Ludlow (northern area)
