= The Amorous Adventures of Moll Flanders =

1965 British film by Terence Young

- British cinema poster
- Directed by: Terence Young
- Written by: Roland Kibbee
- Based on: Moll Flanders by Daniel Defoe
- Produced by: Marcel Hellman; Richard Hellman
- Starring: Kim Novak; Richard Johnson; Angela Lansbury; Vittorio De Sica; Leo McKern; George Sanders; Lilli Palmer; Hugh Griffith; Daniel Massey
- Cinematography: Ted Moore
- Edited by: Frederick Wilson
- Music by: John Addison
- Production company: Winchester Productions
- Distributed by: Paramount Pictures
- Release dates: July 22, 1965 (London); May 26, 1965 (New York)
- Running time: 126 minutes
- Country: United Kingdom
- Budget: $2,400,000
- Box office: $2,000,000 (U.S./ Canada rentals)

The Amorous Adventures of Moll Flanders is a 1965 British historical comedy film directed by Terence Young and starring Kim Novak, Richard Johnson and Angela Lansbury. It is based on the 1722 novel Moll Flanders by Daniel Defoe.

== Plot ==
In 18th-century England, orphan girl Moll Flanders becomes a servant for the town's mayor, who has two grown sons. Moll has a romantic relationship with the eldest son, but after he abandons her, she marries the younger son, a drunken fool who dies, making her a young widow.

Moll is employed by Lady Blystone as a servant. She meets a bandit pretending to be a sea captain called Jemmy who mistakes her for the lady of the house and woos her. Moll rebuffs the advances of Mrs. Blystone's husband but is sacked from her job when they are spotted together.

A banker marries Moll, but on their wedding night, she flees from him when Jemmy's gang of thieves appear. She pursues Jemmy to a town where she begins her own life of thievery. She is jailed and finds Jemmy there as well. Her husband dies of a sudden heart attack, leaving her as the sole inheritor of his fortune. She buys her freedom and that of Jemmy, whom she marries aboard ship on their way to the United States.

== Cast ==
- Kim Novak as Moll Flanders
- Claire Ufland as Young Moll
- Richard Johnson as Jemmy
- Angela Lansbury as Lady Blystone
- Leo McKern as Squint
- Vittorio De Sica as The Count
- George Sanders as The Banker
- Lilli Palmer as Dutchy
- Peter Butterworth as Grunt
- Noel Howlett as Bishop
- Dandy Nichols as Orphanage Superintendent
- Cecil Parker as The Mayor
- Barbara Couper as The Mayor's Wife
- Daniel Massey as Elder Brother
- Derren Nesbitt as Younger Brother
- Ingrid Hafner as Elder Sister
- June Watts as Younger Sister
- Anthony Dawson as Officer of Dragoons
- Judith Furse as Miss Glowber
- Richard Wattis as Jeweller
- Hugh Griffith as Prison Governor

== Production ==
Several attempts to film the novel preceded the project. In 1953, Umberto Scarpelli announced that he would film it in Italy. In 1954, Vanessa Brown announced that she would star in a film version to be produced by her husband Richard Franklyn, and based on a script by Roland Kibbee. In 1956, Gina Lollobrigida was reportedly working on an adaptation. Marcel Hellman of Associated British was to produce a version starring Richard Todd as the highwayman Jemmy, with Michael Anderson to direct. In 1961, John Osborne wrote a script as a vehicle for Sophia Loren.

The success of Tom Jones (1963) rekindled interest in a film adaptation. In February 1964, it was announced that J. Arthur Rank had acquired the script and struck a deal with Paramount whereby Rank would provide $1 million of the budget while Paramount provided $1.4 million. Marcel Hellman, who helped negotiate the deal, was to be executive producer. Later that month, it was announced that Terence Young would direct and that Denis Cannan was rewriting the script. The film was to be a coproduction between Hellman's and Young's production companies. The lead role was originally considered for Diane Cilento, but was unavailable, so Kim Novak was announced as the star in August 1964. Richard Johnson was selected to play Jemmy over 140 other actors seen for the role. After filming ended, Novak and Johnson married in March 1965.

Because of the difficulty encountered in finding authentic locations, the story's era was moved from the 17th to the 18th century in order to use Queen Anne buildings. The film's period adviser was Vyvyan Holland, son of Oscar Wilde, who performed a similar role for Tom Jones.

The production was filmed mainly in Kent at Chilham, as-well as Shepparton Studios. In September 1964, a fire erupted at Chilham Castle. Some of the other scenes were shot in Castle Lodge, a Tudor house in the centre of Ludlow, Shropshire.

Moll has far fewer lovers in the film adaptation than in the novel by Daniel Defoe. In the film, Moll has no children, but in the book, she has many children with her husbands and lovers. The film also lacks Moll's adventures to America before her escape from jail that are included in the novel. This includes an important subplot in the book in which Moll marries a man whom she fails to realize is her half-brother in Virginia, and she discovers her mother there living with him. After she learns of her incestuous relationship with her husband, she becomes severely ill and returns to England.

== Reception ==
=== Critical ===
In a contemporary review for The New York Times, critic Howard Thompson wrote: "'The Amorous Adventures of Moll Flanders' has three attributes: a fast, funny and fine opening half-hour or so, a rich, flavorsome production and the brief, rakish presence of Lilli Palmer. Unfortunately, Paramount's English-made showcase for Daniel Defoe's steamy lady of Old London, personified by Kim Novak, runs for two hours. What begins as a briskly bawdy and amusing odyssey of a buffeted, grasping charmer eventually dissolves into pretentious and tedious burlesque. ... Miss Novak's amorous Moll is far from memorable. But for two long hours she's certainly ready and willing.

Terence Young said: "I think it's a damn good film despite the critics." He added that there were "fifty-nine cuts" made for the American release "which I suppose were made in the interests of American morality."

=== Box office ===
The Amorous Adventures of Moll Flanders ranked among the 13 most popular films in the UK in 1965.
