= Castle Lodge, Ludlow =

Medieval house in Shropshire, England

Coordinates: 52.3671°N 2.7211°W

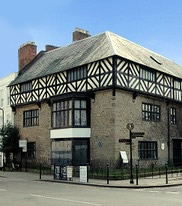
Castle Lodge

Castle Lodge is a medieval and Tudor house in Ludlow, Shropshire, situated close to Ludlow Castle. Scenes from the 1965 film version of Moll Flanders were shot here. The lower stone portion dates from the 14th century, while the timber-framed superstructure was added in the late 16th century. The house has a large collection of imported oak panelling, of various dates. It was the home of Elizabeth I's Master of Requests and was once used as a prison.

== Supposed royal connections ==
There is no documentary evidence for the widely held opinion of Castle Lodge being the residence of Catherine of Aragon whilst she was married to Prince Arthur or when widowed. The building was not constructed until the 1570s, 60 years later than any possible occupation by Catherine, with the top floor being added in the early 17th century. The couple lived in apartments adjacent to the Great Hall in Ludlow Castle. In 1509 she married Henry VIII, Arthur's younger brother after Arthur's death from sweating sickness in 1502. Between these events Catherine lived in Durham House in London.

== Ownership ==
Castle Lodge has been privately owned throughout its history and was a hotel up until the Second World War. The Lodge was re-opened to the public in 1999, after which time over £100,000 was spent on the restoration of the building by owner Bill Pearson. Pearson struggled to find public or private funding for the upkeep of the building, and created plans to convert Castle Lodge into a hotel once again. Nevertheless, these plans never reached fruition, a failure which Pearson attributes to the lack of support from local businesses, stating that "if it [Castle Lodge] was anywhere else but Ludlow we would be getting a £1,000 a week grant to do it". Pearson claimed that if his plans for a hotel were rejected, "Castle Lodge will be down the swanee. It will be the end." In October 2019 it was announced the property had new owners who had begun to undertake the necessary consent process with a view to converting Castle Lodge into a boutique hotel. As of February 2020 Castle Lodge is closed to the public while restoration and refurbishment takes place.

== Use in film ==
A 1965 film adaptation titled The Amorous Adventures of Moll Flanders starred Kim Novak as Moll Flanders and Richard Johnson as Jemmy with Angela Lansbury as Lady Blystone, with George Sanders as the banker, and Lilli Palmer as Dutchy had some of its scenes shot in Castle Lodge.

== See also ==
- Grade II* listed buildings in Shropshire Council (A–G)
- Listed buildings in Ludlow (northern area)
