= Moll Flanders =

1722 novel by Daniel Defoe

The Fortunes and Misfortunes of the Famous Moll Flanders
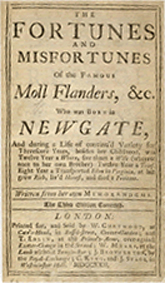
- Author: Daniel Defoe
- Language: English
- Genre: Novel, picaresque
- Set in: England and Virginia Colony, 1613–1683
- Published: 1722
- Publisher: William Rufus Chetwood
- Publication place: Kingdom of Great Britain
- Media type: Print: octavo
- Pages: xiii, 424
- OCLC: 702355312
- Dewey Decimal: 823.5
- LC Class: PR3404.M6
- Text: The Fortunes and Misfortunes of the Famous Moll Flanders at Wikisource

Moll Flanders (Note: Full title: The Fortunes and Misfortunes of the Famous Moll Flanders, &c. Who was Born in Newgate, and during a Life of continu'd Variety for threescore Years, besides her Childhood, was Twelve Year a Whore, five times a Wife (whereof once to her own Brother) Twelve Year a Thief, Eight Year a Transported Felon in Virginia, at last grew Rich, liv'd Honest, and died a Penitent) is a picaresque novel by Daniel Defoe, first published in 1722. It purports to be an autobiographical account of the life of the eponymous heroine, detailing her exploits from birth until old age as she uses her wits, cunning and charm to provide herself with financial security.

While the novel is now generally attributed to Defoe, and his name is given as the author in modern printings, the original text does not list an author and was presented as an autobiography. The attribution to Defoe was first made by bookseller Francis Noble in 1770, thirty-nine years after Defoe's death in 1731.

Moll Flanders has been adapted numerous times for stage, radio, film and television. It has historically been the subject of occasional police censorship.

== Plot ==
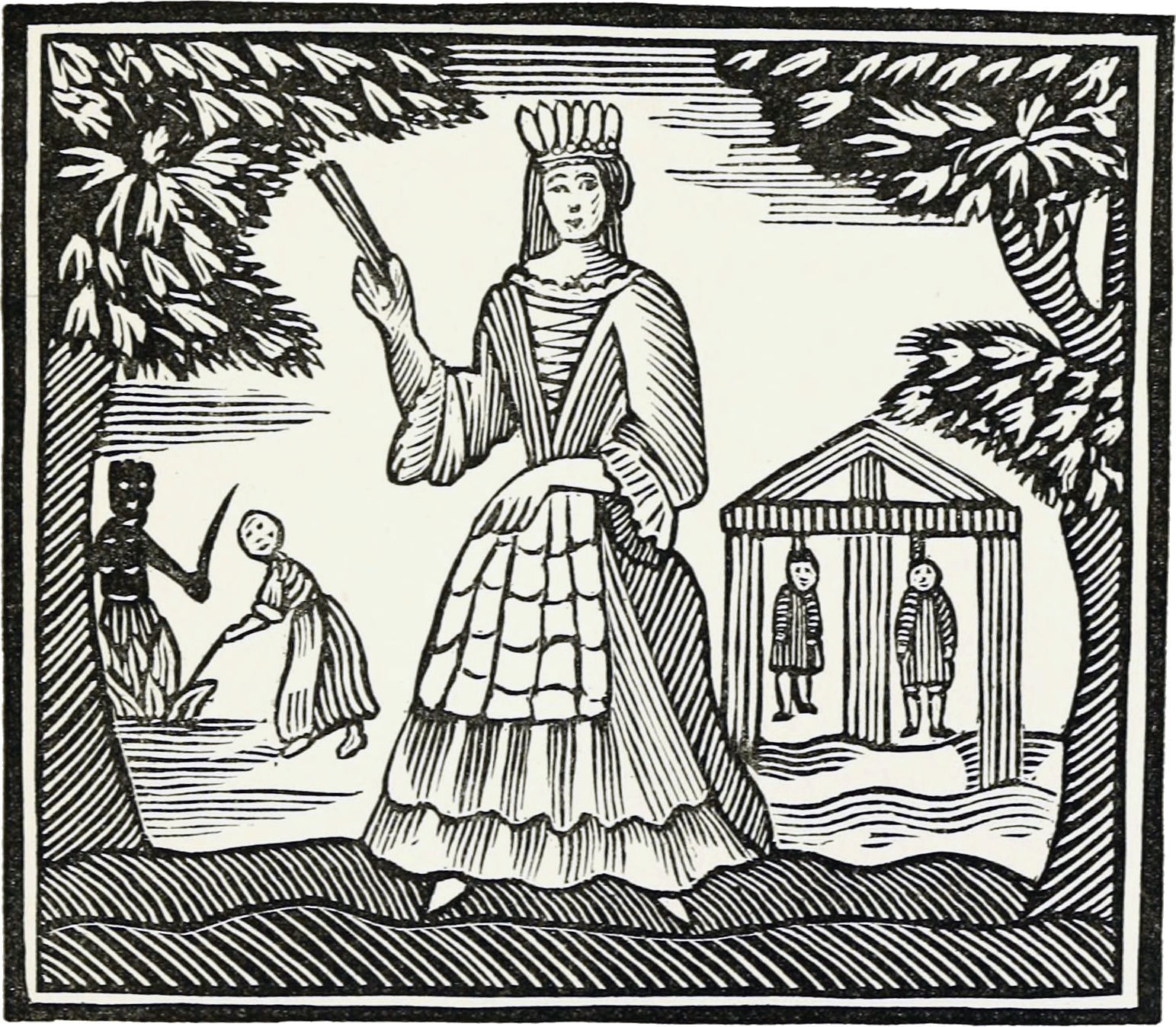
An illustration from an 18th-century chapbook.

“Moll Flanders” informs the reader that this is not her real name, but an alias to protect her identity for legal reasons. She details her birth in Newgate Prison to a mother who delayed execution by “pleading her belly”, a custom of postponing death by claiming pregnancy. After giving birth, Moll’s mother is given a reprieve on her sentence and transported to British America instead, while Moll ends up with a travelling Romani family, from whom she escapes in the city of Colchester. A three year old Moll is placed in the care of a kind Nurse, who encourages her dreams of becoming a gentlewoman.

After her Nurse dies, a teenage Moll becomes the servant of a wealthy family. She is seduced by the family’s eldest son, who promises to marry her when he comes into his inheritance. However, after the youngest son, Robin, unexpectedly confesses his love for Moll, the eldest son reneges on his promise and convinces his parents to approve the marriage. A devastated Moll marries Robin and has several children.

Robin dies five years later. Moll leaves their children in the care of her in-laws and moves to London, where she passes herself off as a wealthy widow to attract a husband who can provide her with financial security. She marries a spendthrift tradesman and has another child who dies in infancy. After giving Moll a life of luxury, her husband runs afoul of his creditors and flees to France, instructing Moll to remarry as if he were dead. Moll takes refuge in the Mint and first begins to use the name “Moll Flanders”. She befriends a young woman, who she helps to win back the affections of a man who had recently spurned her. The woman in turn introduces Moll to a wealthy Captain who owns a plantation in Virginia, and Moll is soon married once again.

Moll and her husband emigrate to his plantation, where she is introduced to his mother. After three more children, one of whom dies, Moll learns that her mother-in-law is actually her own biological mother, which makes her husband her half-brother. At the urging of her mother, Moll keeps the information to herself, but emotionally withdraws from her marriage. This drives her husband into depression until Moll is forced to reveal the truth to him. They agree to dissolve the marriage and Moll returns to England, leaving her children in Virginia.

Moll moves to Bath to seek another husband, where she befriends a married gentleman whose wife has been confined due to insanity. Their relationship becomes sexual, and Moll falls pregnant. She becomes a kept woman, with her gentleman paying for lodgings in Hammersmith as she gives birth to their son. However, the gentleman later survives a near-fatal illness and breaks off their arrangement. Moll leaves their son in his care, assured he will be well looked after.

While masquerading as a wealthy widow in London, Moll attempts to lure a bank clerk into marriage, but learns he is already married to an adulterous woman. Moll then befriends a woman who takes her on a trip to Lancashire, where she is introduced to the woman’s brother, a supposedly wealthy gentleman named Jemmy. Moll and Jemmy marry, with his sister attesting to Moll’s fictitious fortune. While planning to move to Jemmy’s estate in Ireland, each realises that the other is actually poor, and that they have both been misled by Jemmy’s “sister”, who is in reality merely an acquaintance. Jemmy discharges Moll from their marriage on the grounds of his destitution, but Moll realises she has fallen in love with him. They spend a month in each other’s company before eventually parting ways, with Jemmy assuring Moll she will inherit any money he should ever make.

Shortly afterward, Moll discovers she is pregnant with Jemmy’s child. She returns to London and takes on the services of a Governess, who gives Moll a tripartite scale of the costs of bearing a child. After Moll gives birth, her Governess sees to it that her child is taken into the care of a countrywoman in exchange for a sum of £5 per year. Moll then resumes communications with the bank clerk, and learns he has divorced his wife. They are married in a rushed wedding ceremony, but the following morning Moll witnesses Jemmy fleeing the scene of a highway robbery. Moll and her fifth husband live in happiness for several years, until he unexpectedly loses his entire fortune and dies of despair. The fates of their two children together are left unstated.

Now desperate, Moll slips into a life of thievery in order to make ends meet. She reunites with her old Governess, who has retired from her former career to become a fence for stolen goods. Moll avoids arrest for many years, gaining infamy among her peers. She briefly becomes the lover of a married gentleman she had previously robbed. Moll is later mistakenly arrested for a theft that she did not commit, and earns a large settlement after she is proven innocent. Moll earns a small fortune from her crimes.

Moll is eventually caught attempting to steal from a house and is sent to Newgate, where she is sentenced to death. She maintains contact with her Governess, who blames herself for Moll’s predicament. Moll befriends a prison chaplain and convinces him of her repentance - the sincerity of which is left ambiguous - leading the chaplain to petition for Moll’s sentence to be reduced to transportation. At the same time, Moll reunites with Jemmy, who has been arrested for crimes he committed both before and after their marriage; she convinces him to request transportation so that they may resume their marriage and start a new life together.

Moll arranges for her Governess to send half of her fortune aboard their ship in the form of goods, but asks that she to hold back the rest for the time being. She talks the captain into letting her and Jemmy stay in a private cabin away from the other convicts, who are sold into slavery upon arrival. A Quaker helps Moll and Jemmy establish a small plantation near Maryland.

Moll learns that her mother has died. Her husband/brother is now blind and infirmed, and has moved with their surviving son to a plantation in Virginia. Moll cautiously introduces herself to her son and is met with open arms, and discovers that her mother has left her an inheritance of a plantation which her son will manage, providing Moll with an income of £100 per year. Moll makes him her heir, gifting him a stolen gold watch.

Moll has her Governess come over with the remainder of her fortune, making Moll extremely wealthy. After her husband/brother dies, Moll tells Jemmy the story of their relationship and introduces him to her son. To Moll’s surprise, Jemmy is understanding - “For, said he, it was no fault of yours, nor of his; it was a mistake impossible to be prevented.” In 1683, an elderly Moll concludes her narrative by revealing she and Jemmy are preparing to return to England to live “in sincere penitence for the wicked lives we have lived”.

== Background ==
Following the success of Robinson Crusoe in 1719, Defoe had become a recognised novelist. By 1721, his political work was tapering off due to the fall of both the Whig and Tory party leaders with whom he had been associated. Robert Walpole was beginning his rise, and Defoe was never fully at home in Walpole's group. Defoe's Whig views are evident in the story of Moll, and the novel's full title gives some insight into this and the outline of the plot.

The novel may have been influenced by the life of Moll King, a London criminal whom Defoe met while visiting his friend Nathaniel Mist in Newgate Prison.

== Gender roles ==
According to Srvidhya Swaminathan, Moll Flanders provides a window into women’s ways of being that do not reflect 18th century gender norms. Moll is reliant on alliances and friendships with other women, many of whom fall outside of the gendered expectations of the era; she marries five times, and has sexual relationships outside of marriage.

One of Defoe's notable contributions to 18th century ideas of female empowerment rests on the notion of women as agents of their own wealth. As Kuhlisch notes, "From the beginning, [Moll] does not believe that she is naturally poor but considers herself entitled to a more affluent life... [and she] defines her identity through her social position, which results from the material effects of her economic activities" (341). That said, it may also be Defoe's "antipathy for England's commoners" that contributed to Moll's socioeconomic ascension (p.99).

== Spiritual autobiography ==
One of the major themes within the book, and a popular area of scholarly research regarding its writer Daniel Defoe, is that of a spiritual autobiography, "a genre of non-fiction prose that dominated Protestant writing during the seventeenth century, particularly in England, particularly that of dissenters". Books within this genre follow a pattern of shallow repentances, followed by a fall back into sin, and eventually culminating in a conversion experience that has a profound impact on the course of their life from that point. The two scholars first to analyse the pattern of spiritual autobiography in Defoe's works, publishing within the same year, were George A. Starr and J. Paul Hunter.

George Starr's book, titled Defoe and Spiritual Autobiography, analyses the pattern of spiritual autobiography, and how it is found in Defoe's books. His focus in the book is primarily on Robinson Crusoe, as that book follows the clearest pattern of spiritual autobiography. He discusses Moll Flanders at length, stating that the disconnectedness of the events in the book can be attributed to the book's spiritual autobiographical nature. He examines the pattern of spiritual autobiography in these events, with the beginning of her fall into sin being a direct results of her vanity prevailing over her virtue.

Moll's "abortive repentances" are highlighted, such as her "repentance" after marrying the bank clerk. Moll is unable to break the pattern of sin that she falls into, one of habitual sin, in which one sin leads to another. Starr describes this gradual process as "hardening", and points to it as what makes up the basic pattern of her spiritual development. In examining her conversion experience, Starr highlights her motive as being "the reunion with her Lancashire husband, and the news that she is to be tried at the next Session, caused her 'wretched boldness of spirit' to abate. 'I began to think,’ she says, 'and to think indeed is one real advance from hell to heaven'".

The culmination of her repentance comes the morning after this moment, when reflecting on the words of the minister that she confessed her sins to. Starr's main criticism of the book as a work of spiritual autobiography stems from the fact that only part, and not all, of Moll's actions contain spiritual significance. The overall pattern is consistent, but does not cover all sections, with some of those other sections focusing in more on social issues/social commentary.

== Film, television, and theatrical adaptations ==
- A 1965 film adaptation titled The Amorous Adventures of Moll Flanders, starring Kim Novak as Moll Flanders and Richard Johnson as Jemmy, with Angela Lansbury as Lady Blystone, George Sanders as the banker, and Lilli Palmer as Dutchy. Some scenes were shot in Castle Lodge, a Tudor house in the centre of Ludlow, Shropshire, England.
- A 1975 two-part BBC TV adaptation, Moll Flanders, starring Julia Foster as Moll and Kenneth Haigh as Jemmy, was adapted by Hugh Whitemore and directed by Donald McWhinnie.
- A 1982 American musical adaptation titled MOLL!, with book by William SanGiacomo and music and lyrics by Thomas Young, received six performances at the Angola Community Theatre in Angola, Indiana.
- A 1993 musical adaptation starring Josie Lawrence as Moll Flanders, with musical direction by Tony Castro.
- A 1996 American adaptation, Moll Flanders, starring Robin Wright Penn as Moll, with Morgan Freeman as Hibble and Stockard Channing as Mrs. Allworthy. This adaptation shares only the title character and ignores most of the plot of the novel.
- A 1996 four-part British television adaptation titled The Fortunes and Misfortunes of Moll Flanders, starring Alex Kingston as Moll and Daniel Craig as Jemmy, was adapted by Andrew Davies and broadcast by ITV. This remains one of the most faithful adaptations of the novel, although it ends when Moll is still a relatively young woman.
- A 2016 two-part British radio adaptation by Nick Perry starring Jessica Hynes was broadcast on BBC Radio 4.
- A 2018 musical version of Perry's radio adaptation was staged at the Mercury Theatre, Colchester.

== Bibliography ==
=== Editions ===
- Defoe, Daniel. The Fortunes and Misfortunes of the Famous Moll Flanders ... Complete and Unabridged. (New York: The Modern Library (Subsidiary of Random House), (N.D., c. 1962–1964).
- Defoe, Daniel. Moll Flanders. (New York: W. W. Norton & Co., 2004). ISBN 978-0393978629. Edited with an introduction and notes by Albert J. Rivero. Contains a selection of essays and contextual material.
- Defoe, Daniel. Moll Flanders. (Wordsworth Classics, 2001). ISBN 978-1853260735. Edited with an introduction and notes by R. T. Jones.

=== Works of criticism ===
- Campbell, Ann. "Strictly Business: Marriage, Motherhood, and Surrogate Families as Entrepreneurial Ventures in Moll Flanders." Studies in Eighteenth-Century Culture 43.1 (2014): 51–68. online
- Chaber, Lois A. "Matriarchal Mirror: Women and Capital in Moll Flanders". PMLA, 97#2 1982.
- Gass, Joshua. "Moll Flanders and the Bastard Birth of Realist Character." New Literary History 45.1 (2014): 111–130. online
- Kibbie, Ann Louise. "Monstrous generation: the birth of capital in Defoe's Moll Flanders and Roxana." Publications of the Modern Language Association of America (1995): 1023–1034 online.
- Mowry, Melissa. "Women, work, rearguard politics, and Defoe's Moll Flanders." Eighteenth Century 49.2 (2008): 97–116. online
- Pollak, Ellen. "'Moll Flanders,' Incest, and the Structure of Exchange." The Eighteenth Century 30.1 (1989): 3–21. online
- Richetti, John Daniel Defoe (Boston: G. K. Hall, 1987).
- Shinagel, Michael Daniel Defoe and Middle-Class Gentility (Cambridge: Harvard University Press, 1968).
- Watt, Ian The Rise of the Novel: Studies in Defoe, Richardson and Fielding (London: Pimlico, 2000) ISBN 978-0712664271. Includes a chapter on Moll Flanders.
- Watt, Ian "The Recent Critical Fortunes of Moll Flanders". Eighteenth-Century Studies, vol. 1, no. 1, 1967.
