= Feathers Hotel, Ludlow =

Grade I listed hotel in Shropshire, England

Feathers Hotel
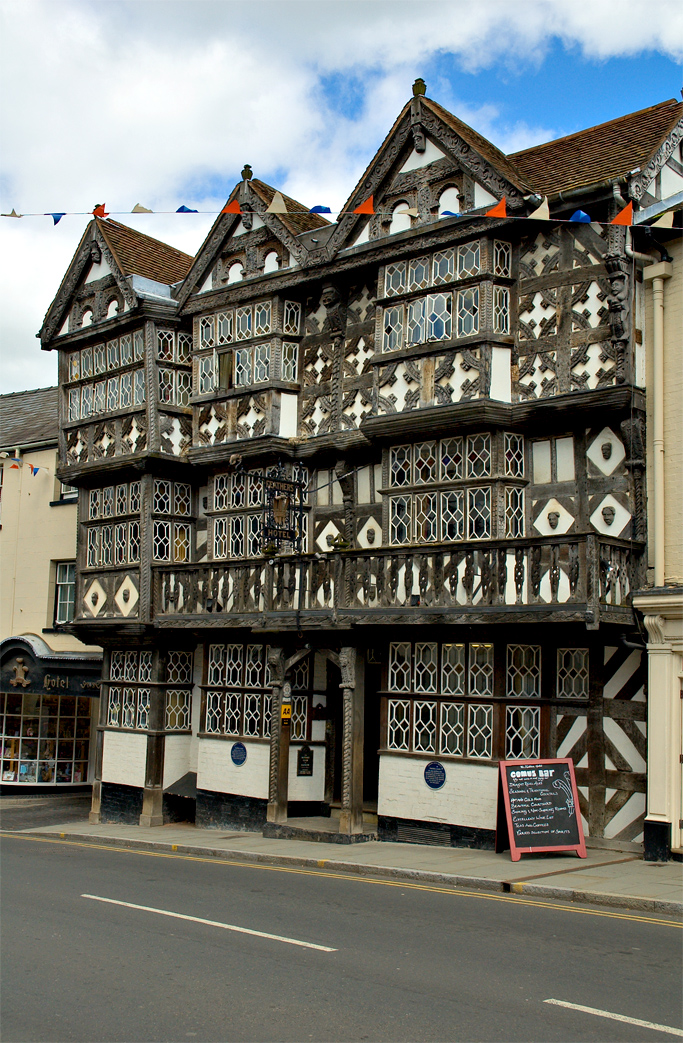

- Location within Shropshire

General information
- Location: 21 Bull Ring, Ludlow, Shropshire, England
- Coordinates: 52°22′7″N 2°43′3″W
- Completed: 1619

Website
- Official site

Listed Building – Grade I
- Official name: Feathers Hotel
- Designated: 15 April 1954
- Reference no.: 1282026

The Feathers Hotel is a historic inn in Ludlow, Shropshire. Its imposing half-timbered frontage was constructed in 1619, over an earlier core, for a local lawyer, Rees Jones. John Newman describes the hotel as a "prodigy" of Tudor architecture and it is noted for its Jacobean furnishings. It is a Grade I listed building, listed on 15 April 1954, and is one of approximately 500 listed buildings in Ludlow, but one of its best known.

== Etymology ==
The timber facade has motifs of Prince of Wales's feathers, from which the inn's name derives.

== History ==
The building was completed in 1619 by Rees Jones, practising attorney from Pembrokeshire who had come to Ludlow to pursue his profession at the "Council of the Marches". The Cambrian Archaeological Association said in 1899, "this is much the most picturesque of all the half-timbered houses now remaining in Ludlow. In adapting it for use as a hotel, none of the old work has been tampered with." The New York Times reportedly named it the "most handsome inn in the world".

== Architecture ==
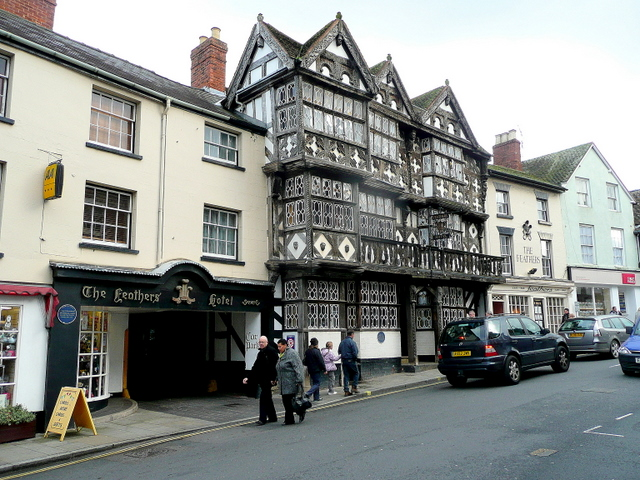
Exterior

The half-timbered black and white building was listed on 15 April 1954. The front dates to the early 17th century, with a timber-frame and plaster; brick; double-depth plain tile roof, with three gables to front and brick end stacks to rear. The hotel is three storeys high excluding the cellar, and has a three-bay plan, with bays which are moulded and carved mullions and transoms, with cast diamond glazing. The central entrance contains a porch with pillars and consoles supporting the 1st floor balcony. The studded plank door is the original. The ground floor room to right of entrance has panelling, mantelpiece and wall paintings and rooms on the first floor have panelling, plaster ceiling and over mantel, with rustic bare Elizabethan timber-framing and ceiling beams in several of the rooms. The dark oak paneling reaches the ceiling of the dining room. Its diamond paneled windows open towards churches and Ludlow Castle. The mantle pieces are richly carved. Another feature is that the chimes of the church tower are clearly heard in the hotel rooms, which also ring at midnight and 4 AM. As of 2007, the hotel had 40 en-suite rooms. Twelve of the rooms were renovated in the late 2000s in the Georgian style and several of the rooms contain four poster beds. Among the other features noted in the hotel is the lock plate with inscriptions of the name of Rees Jones. The lintels of the doors have fine carvings. When it was converted to an inn in 1670 alterations made included a balcony which was added for "electioneering."

Robert Pancheri, famous for his wooden architectural sculptures and carvings for churches and public buildings, was involved in the restoration of the wooden carvings on the Feathers Hotel. He received many awards for his works, including a Civic Trust Award in 1970 for his work for the Feathers Hotel.

== Rivalry with The Bull ==
On the opposite side of the street is the Bull Hotel and the two hostelries partake in a tug-of-war competition every Boxing Day across the street itself.

== See also ==
- Grade I listed buildings in Shropshire
- Listed buildings in Ludlow (northern area)

== Sources ==
- Newman, John; Pevsner, Nikolaus (2006). Shropshire. The Buildings of England. New Haven and London: Yale University Press. ISBN 0-300-12083-4.
