= Listed buildings in Ludlow (northern area) =

Ludlow is a civil parish in Shropshire, England. It contains over 420 listed buildings that are recorded in the National Heritage List for England. Of these, nine are listed at Grade I, the highest of the three grades, 25 are at Grade II*, the middle grade, and the others are at Grade II, the lowest grade. Most of the listed buildings are grouped around the centre of the town, from a line stretching from Castle Square, along High Street and King Street to Tower Street, and southwards to the River Teme, and to the north along Bull Ring and Corve Street.

The listed buildings reflect the history of the town from the medieval period to the present. The oldest significant buildings are the remains of Ludlow Castle, Broad Gate, a former gateway to the town, St Laurence's Church, and surviving sections of the Town Walls. Most of the listed buildings are houses, cottages, shops, public buildings, hotels and public houses, the earlier ones timber framed, or basically timber framed and later refronted or encased in brick. During the 18th century larger and grander houses were built, most of them in brick. Other listed buildings include weirs, bridges, workshops, almshouses, two gazebos, a well head, two former toll houses, a former paper mill, a hospital, banks, a drinking fountain, and two telephone kiosks.

This list contains the listed buildings in the northern area of the town, including those along a line stretching from Castle Square at the west, along Market Street, King Street and Tower Street at the east, and buildings to the north of this line. The listed buildings in the southern area can be found at Listed buildings in Ludlow (southern area).

== Key ==
Grade	Criteria
I	Buildings of exceptional interest, sometimes considered to be internationally important
II*	Particularly important buildings of more than special interest
II	Buildings of national importance and special interest

== Buildings ==
Name and location	Photograph	Date	Notes	Grade
Ludlow Castle; 52.3675°N 2.7234°W		Late 11th century	The castle buildings were extended and improved through to the 17th century, but after the Civil War it was abandoned and left to deteriorate. However substantial remains have survived, and these include the outer bailey, and the inner bailey, which is elliptical in shape. The outer bailey includes a two-storey gatehouse, and the circular Mortimer's Tower, and contains the walls of the porter's lodge, a prison and stables, and St Peter's Chapel. The inner bailey has an entrance tower, inside is the circular chapel of St Mary Magdalene, and around the walls are the hall, the judge's lodgings, the great chamber block, and ranges of other rooms and structures. The castle is also a Scheduled Monument.	I
St Laurence's Church; 52.3682°N 2.7187°W		13th century	The oldest part of the church is the south doorway, considerable parts date from the 14th century, but most of the church is from the 15th century. It was restored in 1859–60 by George Gilbert Scott, and in 1889–91 by Arthur Blomfield. The church is built in sandstone and has a lead roof. It consists of a nave with a clerestory, north and south aisles, a hexagonal south porch, north and south transepts, a chancel with north and south chapels, a north vestry, and a tower at the crossing. The tower has two tall stages, polygonal angle buttresses, embattled parapets, and polygonal angle turrets with pinnacles.	I
Town Walls from Castle Walk House to Linney Gate; 52.36844°N 2.72116°W		13th century	The walls are in stone on bedrock, and have some brick in the superstructure. They are between about 5 metres (16 ft) and 10 metres (33 ft) high.	II
Town Walls from the site of Corve Gate eastwards 52.36898°N 2.71719°W	—	13th century	The walls are in stone, and between about 4 metres (13 ft) and 6 metres (20 ft) high.	II
Town Walls from Linney Gate eastwards 52.36875°N 2.71901°W	—	13th century	The walls are in stone with some buttressing. They are between about 5 metres (16 ft) and 8 metres (26 ft) feet high.	II
Castle Lodge and railings 52.36711°N 2.72119°W		13th or 14th century	The oldest part of the house is the north doorway, most of the building dating from the late 16th or early 17th century. There are three storeys, the lower two storeys in stone and the top storey timber framed with plaster infill. It has a hipped tile roof, with four bays facing Castle Square and two on the left facing Mill Street. The top floor is jettied with moulded bressumers on corbels. On the Mill Street front is a two-storey canted bay window. The other windows in the lower floors are mullioned and transomed, and in the top floor they are mullioned. The doorway has a pointed arch. Enclosing the forecourt on both fronts are wrought iron railings and a gate.	II*
The Rectory; 52.36851°N 2.71956°W		c. 1320	The building has been altered. It is roughcast and has a tile roof, two storeys and an attic, and four bays. The left part is basically timber framed and the right part is in stone. The entrance is in the second bay, and has a doorway with a moulded surround in a chamfered pointed arch, and the upper floor is jettied and gabled. The windows are casements in moulded architraves, and there is one dormer on the front and four at the rear.	II*
1 Broad Street and 19 and 20 King Street; 52.367701°N 2.71882°W		c. 1404	A timber framed shop on a corner site, with plaster infill and a tile roof. There are three storeys and cellars, two bays on each front, and two gables on the King Street front. In the ground floor are shop fronts and, above, each floor is jettied with dragon beams. The windows are casements with leaded lights.	II*
27 Bull Ring; 52.36846°N 2.71743°W		15th century	A house, later a shop, it is timber framed with plaster infill, and has a tile roof with a gable to the front. There are two storeys and one bay. In the upper floor is canted oriel window with mullions, on a bressumer with consoles. In the ground floor is a 20th-century shop front, with a recessed door to the right and a passageway. At the rear is weatherboarding, and a two-storey timber-framed wing with brick infill and two gables.	II
17 Tower Street and 1 Old Street; 52.36810°N 2.71723°W	—	15th century	The building was altered through the 17th century and in the 20th century, and later used as shops and a restaurant. It is rendered, and has a tile roof, hipped in Tower Street. There are two storeys and an attic, five bays on Tower Street and two on Old Street. In the ground floor are 20th-century shop fronts and windows, and the lower floors are undercut, especially on the comer. There are two gabled dormers.	II
Rose and Crown Inn (8 Church Street); 52.36792°N 2.71973°W		15th century	The oldest part of the public house is a rear wing, which incorporates a cruck truss. The main part dates from the 17th century, with an 18th-century range and 19th-century extensions, all arranged around a courtyard. The oldest parts are timber framed with plaster infill, the later parts are in brick, and the roofs are mainly tiled. Facing the entrance to the courtyard is a canted projecting bay with a flat roof. The windows vary; some are sash windows, some of which are horizontally-sliding, others are casements, and at the rear is a mullioned window with a quatrefoil head.	II
14 and 15 King Street; 52.36784°N 2.71820°W		Late 15th century	A pair of shops with living accommodation, basically timber framed, and refronted in the 18th century. They are stuccoed and have modillioned eaves, tiled roofs, and three storeys. No. 14 has two bays and No. 15 has one. There is one casement window, and the others are sashes. Both buildings have 19th-century shop fronts; No. 14 has a doorway on a canted corner, and No, 15 has a deep fascia board on an ornate console. Inside is original timber framing.	II*
The Tolsey and railings 52.36802°N 2.71746°W		Late 15th century	On an island site and originally a market hall, the ground floor has been filled in, and the building has been converted into shops. There are two storeys, an attic and a cellar, three bays, and a single-storey extension to the right. The upper floor is timber framed, the ground floor is in stone and contains shop fronts, and the roof is tiled. The windows are casements, and at the rear are iron railings enclosing the cellar area.	II
46, 47, 48 and 50 Corve Street; 52.37277°N 2.71983°W		16th century	A row of timber framed houses with tile roofs and two storeys, the upper floor being jettied. Nos. 47 and 48 have one bay each and a canted bay window in the ground floor, and No. 47 has a recessed porch. Nos. 48 and 50 have two bays each, and No. 50 has a gable and an attic, and a short rear wing. The windows are casements.	II*
106 and 107 Corve Street; 52.37229°N 2.71931°W		16th century	A pair of timber framed houses that were partly refaced in brick in the 18th century. They have a tile roof, two storeys and an attic, and three bays. The timber framing remains exposed in the upper storey of the left two bays and in the left gable end. In the ground floor are two doorways and three bow windows. In the upper floor are casement windows, the window in the right bay with a segmental head, and above it is a gabled dormer.	II
109 Corve Street; 52.37217°N 2.71927°W	—	16th century	The house was refronted in the 18th and 19th centuries. It is basically timber framed and encased in brick, and has a tile roof with the timber-framed gable facing the street. There are two stories, one bay, and a rear wing. The doorway is to the left and there is a casement window in each floor, the one in the upper floor under a segmental arch. In the rear wing is exposed timber framing in the upper floor.	II
112A and 112B Corve Street; 52.37182°N 2.71918°W		16th century	A timber framed house with a tile roof, later divided into two dwellings. There are two storeys, two bays, and a rear wing. The upper storey is jettied, and has a moulded bressumer. In the ground floor is a doorway with a passageway to the left and a canted bay window to the right, and in the upper floor are casement windows.	II
1 Quality Square; 52.36788°N 2.71999°W		16th century	A house altered in the 18th and 20th centuries, later used for other purposes, it is in stone with brick panels; quoins, and a tile roof. There are three storeys and a cellar, and two bays. Some of the windows are mullioned and transomed.	II
2 and 3 Quality Square; 52.36781°N 2.72022°W		16th century (probable)	A pair of houses that were altered in the 18th and 20th centuries. They are in stone with a tile roof, and have three storeys and basements, and three bays. The doorways have moulded pilasters and simple hoods on consoles. The windows are sashes with brick quoins and segmental heads.	II
Bull Hotel; 52.36865°N 2.71778°W		16th century (probable)	The hotel is timber framed and was refronted in the 18th century. The front is in stuccoed brick, and has storey bands, moulded eaves, a coped parapet, and a tile roof. There are three storeys and two bays. The windows on the front are sashes, and in the right bay is the entrance to the courtyard. At the rear of this bay is a canted oriel window on decorative consoles, the floor above which is jettied. This floor contains a loading platform, and over this is a gable with weatherboarding and a pulley joist. The other bay continues as a two-storey five-bay range, partly weatherboarded, the upper storey jettied, and containing casement windows.	II
Tanners Cottages (64 and 65 Corve Street); 52.37312°N 2.71988°W		16th century	The cottages were altered in the 17th century. They are in brick in the lower floor, timber framed above with brick modillion eaves, and have a tile roof. There are two storeys and eight bays. In the ground floor are two doorways and a passageway with a bressumer above. The windows are sashes, and in the passageway is exposed timber framing.	II
16 Tower Street; 52.36815°N 2.71706°W	—	Late 16th century	A house, later a shop, it is timber framed with plaster infill and a Welsh slate roof. There are two storeys and a cellar, and two bays. In the ground floor is a 19th-century shop front, and in the upper floor are sash windows.	II
Foxe's Almshouses and wall 52.37225°N 2.71961°W	—	1590	The almshouses are in stone with a tile roof, and have two storeys and a symmetrical front of four bays. There are four doorways with chamfered quoined surrounds and mullioned windows that have casements with lattice glazing. In the centre is a painted tablet with a coat of arms and the date under a chamfered hood mould. In the right gable is timber framing with brick infill, and attached to the right of the building is a wall.	II
33 Corve Street; 52.37212°N 2.71956°W	—	16th to 17th century	A house that was altered later, it is in stone with a tile roof. There are two storeys and a cellar, and four bays. In the third bay is a doorway with a beaded surround, and above is a gabled half-dormer. The windows are casements. The left return is roughcast and has brick quoins, and the rear is exposed timber framing.	II
95 and 96 Corve Street; 52.37284°N 2.71936°W	—	16th to 17th century	The older house is No. 96, it is timber framed with brick infill. No. 95 dates from the late 18th century, it is in brick, and has a lean-to on the left. They have tile roofs, two storeys and four bays. The windows are casements, some under segmental arches. Inside No. 96 is timber framing with wattle and daub infill.	II
Unicorn Inn; 52.37324°N 2.71987°W		16th to 17th century	The public house was altered in the 18th century. It is partly timber framed and partly in brick, with a tile roof. There are two storeys, four bays, and rear wings. Most of the windows are sashes, some are casements, and there is a passageway through to the rear.	II
The Reader's House; 52.36846°N 2.71818°W		1616	The house, which contains earlier fabric, is partly timber framed with plaster infill, and partly in stone, and has a tile roof. There are three storeys, and an entrance front of three bays. The central bay contains a full-height timber-framed gabled porch with mullioned and transomed windows. The doorway has an ornate carved doorcase and a decorative lintel, and above it is a moulded bressumer. The porch is flanked by massive chimney breasts. The gable in the left return has decorative bargeboards, and the gable end in the right return has jettied middle and top floors.	I
Feathers Hotel; 52.36865°N 2.71748°W		1619	A house, refronted on an earlier core, and later a hotel, it is timber framed with plaster infill, and has a tiled roof with three gales facing the street. There are three storeys and a cellar, three bays, and rear ranges. The doorway has a decorative surround and a fanlight, and in front of it is a porch with decorative pillars and consoles supporting a first floor balcony with balusters. In the ground floor are three bay windows, and there are bay windows in the outer bays of the upper two storeys. Both upper floors are jettied with moulded bressumers. All the windows are mullioned and transomed and have cast iron diamond glazing.	I
45 Bull Ring; 52.36788°N 2.71782°W		Early 17th century	A timber framed shop with plaster infill, and a tile roof with twin gables facing the street. There are four storeys and two bays. In the ground floor is a 19th-century shop front that has a central door with reeded pilasters. The plate glass windows have moulded mullions and leaded clerestories, and above are cast iron window box guards. The first floor contains two mullioned and transomed oriel windows. The upper two floors are each jettied on decorative consoles, and contain casement windows.	II*
7 Church Street; 52.36772°N 2.71971°W		Early 17th century	A shop with living accommodation, it is partly in brick and partly timber framed with brick infill, and has a roof of slate at the front and tile at the rear. There are two storeys and three bays. In the ground floor is a 20th-century shop front, and above are casement windows.	II
2 High Street; 52.36761°N 2.71947°W		Early 17th century	A house, later a shop with living accommodation, it is timber framed with a tile roof. There are three storeys and an attic, and one bay. In the ground floor is a 19th-century shop front with a central doorway and moulded glazing shafts. The middle floor contains a canted bay window with a moulded underhang. The top floor is jettied on figurehead consoles and contains a casement window, and above is a gabled dormer.	II
4 High Street; 52.36758°N 2.71963°W		Early 17th century	A house, later a shop with living accommodation, it is timber framed with rendered infill and a slate roof. There are three storeys and a cellar, and two bays. In the ground floor is a 20th-century shop front with a central doorway, stall risers in Cotswold stone, and plate glass windows over which is a carved frieze. In the upper floors are mullioned and transomed windows containing casements. At the rear is some brickwork and a jettied first floor.	II
Tamberlane House; 52.36773°N 2.71929°W		Early 17th century	A shop with living accommodation that was extended in the 18th century. The original part is timber framed with plaster infill and has a tiled gabled roof. There are three storeys, an attic and a cellar, and one bay. In the middle floor is a canted mullioned and transomed bay window, and above are casement windows. The top floor is jettied with a decorative bressumer on enriched consoles, and the gable has decorative bargeboards. In the ground floor is an early 20th-century shop front, that stretches under the extension, which is in brick, with three storeys and a cellar, and three bays. It contains a storey band, the windows are sashes, and the left return is stuccoed.	II
York House (69 Corve Street); 52.37347°N 2.71993°W		Early 17th century	A timber framed house with brick and plaster infill, and a tile roof with three gables facing the street. There are three storeys and three bays. There are two doorways and the windows are casements. The middle floor is jettied and has a moulded bressumer on decorative consoles.	II
41 Bull Ring; 52.36825°N 2.71734°W	—	17th century	A house, later a shop with a 20th-century front, it is roughcast and has a tile roof with a gable at the front. There are three storeys and two bays. In the ground floor is a 20th-century shop front, with a passageway on the left, and in the upper floors are casement windows. In the passageway and at the rear is timber framing.	II
47, 48 and 49 Bull Ring; 52.36815°N 2.71767°W		17th century	Shops with living accommodation on an island site, with later alterations. Both have two storeys and attics, shop fronts, and mostly sash windows. No. 49 is timber framed and was refronted in brick in the 18th century, it has a roof of Welsh slate at the front and tile at the rear, and a front of four bays. The left bay is gabled, and there is a gabled dormer; the gables have ornamental bargeboards. Nos. 47 and 48 are partly timber framed with plaster infill and are partly stuccoed, and have Welsh slate roofs with two gables and finials.	II
2 and 4 Castle Street; 52.36765°N 2.71998°W		17th century	A pair of timber framed shops that were encased in brick in the early 18th century. They have modillioned and moulded eaves, a tiled roof, three storeys, attics and cellars, and three bays. The central bay contains a passageway with a timber lintel and posts, above which is a blocked round-headed opening. Flanking this, in the ground floor are shop fronts dating from the 19th and 20th centuries, and in the upper floors are sash windows. In the passageway is exposed timber framing, and at the rear is a gabled dormer.	II
6 Castle Street; 52.36764°N 2.72010°W		17th century	A shop with living accommodation. The oldest part is the rear wing which is in brick and has three storeys, three bays, and contains sash windows. The front dates from the late 18th century, and has a moulded eaves cornice and a slate mansard roof. There are three storeys and an attic, and two bays. In the ground floor is a 20th-century shop front that has a recessed doorway between moulded pilasters over which is a moulded cornice on decorative brackets. Above are sash windows in moulded architraves.	II
10 Church Street and 1 and 2 College Mews; 52.36778°N 2.71949°W		17th century	A shop with living accommodation, and a range of two houses behind. The shop, which was refronted in the 18th century, is stuccoed and has a Welsh slate roof with two gables facing the street. There are three storeys and two bays. In the ground floor is a late 19th-century shop front with a passage entrance to the left, and in the upper floors are sash and casement windows. At the rear are moulded bressumers with pendants and inscriptions. Stretching from the rear is a range of two roughcast houses with tiled roofs, two storeys, attics and cellars, and two bays each. They have modillion eaves and casement windows, and there are three gabled dormers.	II
54, 55, 57 and 58 Corve Street; 52.37290°N 2.71983°W	—	17th century	A group of houses that were altered in the 19th century, they are in brick with a Welsh slate roof. There are three storeys, and three bays, the outer bays gabled. In the central recessed bay is a passageway, and the windows are sashes, most with arched lintels. In the passageway and inside the houses is exposed timber framing.	II
72, 73 and 74 Corve Street; 52.37377°N 2.71995°W	—	17th century	A row of three timber framed houses that were refronted with brick in the 18th and 19th centuries. They have tiled roofs, two storeys and attics, and seven bays, and the windows are casements. No. 72 has exposed timber framing in the upper floor, and a doorway with a fanlight flanked by bow windows. Nos. 73 and 74 have a storey band and most windows are under segmental heads, and there are five gabled dormers.	II
89, 90 and 91 Corve Street; 52.37290°N 2.71954°W	—	17th century	A row of timber framed houses that were later refaced in brick that have modillion eaves, tile roofs, two storeys, and two gabled rear wings. No. 89 on the left was refaced in the 18th century, and has a storey band and one bay. In the ground floor is a doorway and a canted bay window, and in the upper floor is a sash window. Nos. 90 and 91 were reface in the 19th century and have five bays, and sash windows and doorways under segmental heads. In the right bay is a passage entrance with a segmental arch, and in the passageway is exposed timber framing.	II
108 Corve Street; 52.37221°N 2.71928°W		17th century	A stone house with a tile roof, two storeys and one bay. It contains a doorway, and there is a casement window in each floor.	II
1A High Street; 52.36764°N 2.71940°W		17th century	A shop with living accommodation, it was altered in the 18th and 19th centuries. The ground floor is in brick, above it is timber framed with plaster infill, and the roof is tiled with two gables facing the street. There are four storeys and a cellar, and two bays. In the ground floor is a doorway and a shop window. Each of the upper floors is jettied with decorative bressumers and consoles. In the left bay in the first and second floors are bow windows containing sashes. Elsewhere are mullioned windows, and the gables have decorative eaves on consoles and finials.	II*
8 High Street; 52.36742°N 2.71982°W		17th century	A shop that was partly refronted and altered in the 18th century, it is partly timber framed and partly stuccoed, and has a hipped slate roof. There are three storeys and a front of three bays. In the ground floor is a 20th-century shop front, and above are sash windows with moulded surrounds and architraves. In the front facing Market Square, the upper floors are jettied and the timber framing is exposed.	II
Corve Cottage (70A Corve Street); 52.37354°N 2.71995°W	—	17th century (probable)	The house was refronted in the 19th century. It is in brick with a tile roof, two storeys and an attic, and one bay. In the ground floor is a bow window, the upper floor contains a casement window, and there is a gabled dormer.	II
Eagle House (17–20 Corve Street); 52.37038°N 2.71907°W		17th century	A row of houses that were altered in the 19th century and later used for other purposes. They are in brick with a Welsh slate roof, and have three storeys and cellars, five bays, and rear wings. In the ground floor are two doorways with pilasters and flat hood, and plate glass windows. The windows in the upper floors are sashes with grooved stuccoed lintels, those in the middle floor also with wrought iron guards. Inside there is exposed timber framing.	II
Merchant House (62 and 63 Corve Street); 52.37302°N 2.71987°W	—	17th century	A timber framed house with plaster infill, partly stuccoed, and a tile roof. There are three storeys, three bays, and a rear wing. The ground floor has two canted bay windows flanking a doorway, and there is another doorway to the left. The middle floor is jettied with a bressumer on brackets, and the windows are casements. In the rear wing is a jettied gable.	II
Old Bull Ring Tavern; 52.36789°N 2.71767°W		17th century	A timber framed public house with tile roofs, it has four gabled bays. The left two bays have three storeys, and the right two have four. Each floor is jettied, and has moulded bressumers on decorative consoles. In the ground floor is a 20th-century inn front. The windows vary; some are mullioned and transomed, some are sashes, and some are casements. The gables have moulded bargeboards.	II*
The Old Tannery; 71 and 71A Corve Street; 52.37361°N 2.71992°W		17th century	A pair of timber framed houses that were refronted in brick in the 18th century. They have a Welsh slate roof, storey bands, three storeys and four bays. There is a doorway with a moulded surround and flat hood on plain consoles, and two further doors to the right. The windows are casements, those in the lower two floors under segmental arches.	II
Tudor House and Cottage (103 and 104 Corve Street); 52.37255°N 2.71942°W		17th century	A pair of timber framed houses with a Welsh slate roof, three storeys and five bays. In the ground floor are three plank doors, a canted bay window and a bow window. The middle floor contains another bay window and a casement window, and in the top floor is a casement window and a sash window. Between the floors are moulded bressumers on decorative consoles.	II
130–131 Corve Street; 52.37049°N 2.71882°W	—	Late 17th century	A house, then an inn, and later used for other purposes, it was refronted in the 18th century. The front is in brick, the roof is slated, and there is some exposed timber framing at the rear. There are two storeys and a cellar, two bays, a 19th-century roughcast lean-to on the left, and at the rear are wings and further one- and two-storey ranges. In the ground floor is a former inn front, with a central doorway with a moulded architrave, flanked by plate glass windows. To the left is a round-headed opening lead to a recessed door with a chamfered surround. The windows above are casements, those in the middle floor with segmental heads, and between them is a wrought iron inn sign hanger.	II
1–6 College Street and medieval remains in garden 52.36835°N 2.71951°W		c. 1690	A house on an earlier core, later divided into flats, it is roughcast and has a tile roof. There are two storeys and a cellar, and five bays. Above the central bay is a small gable with timber framing, bargeboards, and a pendant. In the ground floor are double doors in a moulded pointed arch with quatrefoils in the spandrels, and with a moulded architrave and a fanlight. The windows are sashes. In the garden are medieval remains, including walls, some with arches.	II
1, 2 and 3 Bull Ring; 52.36805°N 2.71789°W		Early 18th century	A row of three shops with living accommodation; Nos. 2 and 3 were refronted in the 20th century. They are in brick with a storey band, and a Welsh slate roof, half-hipped to the right. There are three storeys, attics and cellars, ten bays, and rear wings, and the windows are sashes. No. 1 has modillion eaves, and a 19th-century shop front with a canted corner to King Street, and in the ground floor of Nos. 2 and 3 are 20th-century shop fronts.	II
8 Corve Street; 52.36938°N 2.71842°W	—	Early 18th century	A brick house with a Welsh slate roof, possibly on an earlier core, it has three storeys, four bays, and a two-storey one-bay wing to the right. The doorway in the right bay has pilasters and a pediment, and the windows are sashes in moulded surrounds and have segmental heads.	II
136 Corve Street; 52.37016°N 2.71864°W		Early 18th century	A brick house, later refronted on earlier timber framing, it has a slate roof, three storeys and a cellar, three bays, and a rear wing. The doorway has pilasters, a moulded architrave, and a moulded pediment. The windows in the lower two floors are sashes under segmental arches, and in the top floor they are casements. In the rear wing is a timber-framed gable.	II
141A Corve Street; 52.36965°N 2.71820°W		Early 18th century	A brick shop that was altered in the 19th century, the ground floor is rendered, and there is a storey band, corbelled eaves, and a Welsh slate roof. The shop has three storeys, three bays, and a rear wing. In the ground floor is a central doorway with a moulded architrave, a fanlight, and a moulded flat hood on fluted consoles, flanked by canted bay windows. The other windows are sashes with moulded surrounds, those in the middle floor under segmental arches.	II
143 and 144 Corve Street; 52.36949°N 2.71808°W		Early 18th century	A pair of brick houses with dentil eaves and a tile roof. They have two storeys, attics and cellars, and each house has two bays. The doorways are in the right bay, and have flat hoods. The windows are sashes, and each house has a gabled dormer.	II
13 High Street; 52.36749°N 2.71936°W	—	Early 18th century	A shop with living accommodation, it is in brick with string courses and a tile roof. There are four storeys, and attic and a cellar, and two bays. In the ground floor is an early 20th-century shop front with a moulded hood on scrolled consoles. In the upper floors are sash windows with moulded surrounds under segmental arches. On the Market Street front is a gabled dormer.	II
7 Market Street; 52.36740°N 2.71936°W	—	Early 18th century	A house on an earlier core, later a shop, it is roughcast with a tile roof. There are three storeys, an attic and a cellar, and two bays. In the ground floor is a doorway on the right, and casement windows, in the middle floor are sash windows, the top floor contains a casement window, and there are two gabled dormers.	II
St Mary's House, railings, screen and gate 52.37337°N 2.71943°W	—	Early 18th century	The house was refronted in the late 19th century. It is in brick with a roof of Welsh slate at the front and tile at the rear. There are two storeys and an E-shaped plan, with a two-bay front, a gabled porch, and two gabled rear wings. On the front are sash windows with moulded surrounds and grooved stuccoed lintels, and elsewhere are casement windows. Attached to the house is a dwarf brick wall with stone coping and cast iron railings, and a gate with a scrolled arch over which is a screen.	II
Willow Cottage (70 Corve Street); 52.37354°N 2.71993°W	—	Early 18th century	A brick cottage on an earlier core, with a tile roof, two storeys and an attic, and one bay. In the ground floor is a doorway with moulded jambs and a stone hood on chamfered wooden brackets, and to the right is a bow window. The upper floor contains a casement window, and above that is a gabled dormer.	II
14 Castle Street; 52.36772°N 2.72079°W		1728	A brick house with rusticated quoins, a parapet with moulded stone coping, and a hipped Welsh slate roof. There are three storeys and a cellar, and a symmetrical front of five bays. Steps lead up to the central doorway that has Doric fluted pilasters, a triglyph frieze, and a segmental pediment. The windows are sashes under segmental arches. In the right return is a doorway with cast iron columns, pilasters, a fanlight, and a flat hood.	II*
9 Corve Street and railings 52.36961°N 2.71862°W		1739	A pair of brick houses with a stuccoed basement, bands, and a parapet with stone coping. There are three storeys and a basement, and each house has three bays. Steps lead up to paired central doorways with fluted pilasters, fanlights and moulded flat hood on brackets. They are flanked by canted bay windows, and in the upper floors are sash windows with segmental heads. In front of the basement area are cast iron railings, and to the right is a passageway with a segmental head.	II
The Buttercross; 52.36777°N 2.71909°W		1743–44	The market hall was designed by William Baker of Audlem in Classical style. It is faced in Grinshill sandstone, and has two storeys, three bays, and a wing to the left. The main part is flanked by pilasters, and there is a moulded frieze and cornice, and a balustraded parapet with ball finials. On the top is an octagonal bell-cupola with a weathervane. On the front is a tetrastyle portico with Doric columns and a pediment, behind which is an open arcade that has arches with keyblocks and moulded architraves. The windows are sashes with architraves and corbelled sills.	I
Corrie House (13 Corve Street); 52.37005°N 2.71883°W		1750	A brick house on a moulded stone plinth, with a parapet that has moulded coping, and a Welsh slate roof. There are three storeys, a symmetrical front of five bays, and a rear wing with a single-storey extension. In the centre is a round-headed doorway with pilasters, a fanlight, a frieze, and a moulded pediment hood. The windows are sashes with stuccoed keyblocks.	II
5 Bull Ring; 52.3682°N 2.71776°W		18th century	A shop with living accommodation, in roughcast brick with a storey band and a tile roof. There are two storeys, an attic and a cellar, and two bays. In the ground floor is a 19th-century shop front, with double doors flanked by canted bay windows under a moulded modillioned awning board. The windows are casements, and there is a gabled dormer.	II
11 Bull Ring; 52.36849°N 2.71771°W	—	18th century	A shop with living accommodation, it is in brick with a Welsh slate roof. There are three storeys and a cellar, and an L-shaped plan, consisting of a front of two bays, and a rear wing with a tile roof. In the ground floor is an early 20th-century shop front, with glazed tiles and a moulded fascia. The upper floors contain sash windows, those in the top floor with segmental heads.	II
12 and 13 Bull Ring; 52.36855°N 2.71774°W	—	18th century	An office and a shop on an earlier core that were refronted in the 20th century. They are in brick with corbelled and moulded eaves, and a tile roof. There are three storeys, No. 12 has two bays, No. 13 has one, and there are rear wings. In the ground floor are 20th-century shop fronts with a continuous hood and fascia board. The windows are sashes; in No.12 the windows in the middle floor have stuccoed lintels with keystones, and in No. 13 the windows in both floors have stuccoed grooved lintels. Inside No.13 and in the rear wings is timber framing.	II
17 and 18 Bull Ring; 52.36890°N 2.71796°W	—	18th century	A pair of brick houses, probably on a 17th-century core, with modillioned eaves, and an asbestos tile roof, hipped on the right. There are two storeys and three bays. In the centre are paired doorways with beaded surrounds, pilasters, fanlights, and flat hoods. The windows are sashes with moulded surrounds, the window to the left of the doorways being taller. At the right the wall curves to the return, which has three storeys. There are three hipped dormers.	II
22 and 23 Bull Ring; 52.36874°N 2.71756°W		18th century	A house, later shops with living accommodation, it is stuccoed and has a Welsh slate roof. There are three storeys, five bays, and a rear wing. In the ground floor on the left is a 19th-century shop front with a central glazed door, panelled pilasters, and a moulded hood on consoles. To the right is another shop front, then a curved 20th-century window, and a passageway leading to the rear. In the upper floors are sash windows.	II
26 Bull Ring; 52.36851°N 2.71745°W		18th century	A house, later an office, it is stuccoed and has a tiled roof with a gabled front. There are three storeys and two bays. In the ground floor is a 20th-century shop front with a recessed entrance on the right, and above are sash windows with beaded surrounds.	II
34 Bull Ring; 52.36833°N 2.71736°W		18th century	A house, later a shop, it is rendered on a 16th-century timber framed core. It has a tiled roof, and a gable at the front with a moulded parapet. In the ground floor is a 20th-century shop front with a central entrance, and in the upper floors are sash windows with beaded surrounds.	II
42 Bull Ring; 52.36791°N 2.71752°W	—	18th century	A house, later a shop, it is rendered, and has a roof with Welsh slate at the front and tiles at the rear. There are three storeys, one bay, and a rear wing. In the ground floor is a 19th-century shop front that has a central door with a fanlight flanked by canted bay windows under a moulded fascia hood. In the upper floors are casement windows.	II
10 Castle Street; 52.36762°N 2.72038°W		18th century	A shop with living accommodation, it is stuccoed, with moulded eaves and a Welsh slate roof. There are three storeys, four bays, and twin gabled rear wings. In the ground floor is a rusticated elliptical arch with a keyblock to the left, and a 19th-century shop front. This has a central door with a fanlight between canted windows, and to the right is a rusticated pilaster. In the upper floors are sash windows in moulded surrounds.	II
20 and 22 Castle Street; 52.36750°N 2.72110°W		18th century	Houses, later used as offices, they are in brick, with a band, moulded eaves, and a tile roof. There are three storeys, and attic and a cellar, three bays, and twin gabled wings at the rear. The doorways have round heads and semicircular fanlights; the left doorway also has pilasters, and a moulded open pediment hood on plain consoles. The windows are sashes with moulded surrounds and grooved stuccoed lintels, those in the middle floor with wrought iron window box guards, and there are two gabled dormers.	II
6 Church Street; 52.36771°N 2.71978°W	—	18th century	A shop with living accommodation, it was refronted in the 20th century, and is in brick with a tile roof. There are three storeys and a cellar, and two bays. In the ground floor is an early 20th-century shop front, and above are sash windows.	II
1 and 2 Church Walk; 52.36855°N 2.71824°W		18th century	A pair of houses that were refronted in the 20th century, they are in brick on a stone core, and have a storey band and a tile roof. There are two storeys, and attic and a cellar, and a front of four bays. The windows are casements under segmental arches, and there are four tile-hung gabled dormers.	II
1 College Street; 52.36817°N 2.71944°W		18th century	A roughcast house on a chamfered stone plinth with a tile roof. There are two storeys and a cellar, and three bays. The windows are sashes and there is a central doorway.	II
2 College Street; 52.36824°N 2.71947°W		18th century	A roughcast house with moulded and modillioned eaves, and a tile roof. There are two storeys, and attic and a cellar, and two bays. The doorway has fluted pilasters, a fanlight, and a flat hood. The windows are sashes, and there is a gabled dormer.	II
12 Corve Street; 52.36996°N 2.71878°W	—	18th century	A house and a shop, it is stuccoed and has a concrete pantile roof. There are three storeys and a cellar, and three bays. In the ground floor is a shop front on the left, and to the right is a plate glass window and a doorway with a flat hood on fluted consoles. In the upper floors are sash windows.	II
32 Corve Street; 52.37131°N 2.71938°W	—	18th century	The house has a late 19th-century front on an earlier core. It is in brick with stuccoed sides, and has a Welsh slate roof. There are two storeys, and an L-shaped plan, with a front of three bays, and a rear wing with a tile roof. The central doorway has an open pediment on consoles. The windows on the front are sashes with moulded surrounds and segmental heads in the ground floor, and elsewhere are casement windows.	II
38 and 39 Corve Street; 52.37237°N 2.71998°W		18th century	Originally a govers' workshop, later stables, then a house, it has a ground floor of stone with rendered brick above, and a tile roof. There are three storeys, three bays, and a two-storey, two-bay wing to the right with a slate roof. The central doorway has a flat hood, the windows are casements under segmental arches, and the top floor is covered in weatherboarding over a louvred ventilation system. At the rear is a gabled staircase projection and a dormer.	II
98 Corve Street; 52.37282°N 2.71953°W	—	18th century	The house was altered later in the 18th century and in the 19th century. It is in brick, and has modillion eaves and a tile roof. There are three storeys and a symmetrical front of two bays. The central doorway has a beaded surround and a moulded flat hood. The windows are sashes, those in the lower two floors under segmental arches. The gable in the left return has exposed timber framing.	II
99 Corve Street; 52.37276°N 2.71951°W	—	18th century	a roughcast brick house on an earlier core, with bands and a tile roof. There are two storeys, an attic and cellars, and four bays. The doorway in the left bay is in blocked recess and has a moulded surround. The windows are casements in moulded surrounds with roughcast arches, and there are two dormers with slate-hung gables.	II
110 Corve Street; 52.37206°N 2.71923°W	—	18th century	The house, which contains earlier material, is in brick with a storey band, and a roof of Welsh slate at the front and tile at the rear. There are two storeys and two bays, and a later rear range. The windows are sashes in moulded surrounds under segmental arches. To the left is an arched passageway with a doorway in the passage, and over its rear is 17th-century timber framing.	II
111 Corve Street; 52.37191°N 2.71921°W	—	18th century	The house, which contains earlier material, is in brick with a storey band, and a Welsh slate roof. There are two storeys, three bays, and a rear wing, a cross-wing, and a further wing, all in stone. The central doorway has a fanlight and a moulded hood on fluted consoles. The windows are sashes with moulded surrounds under segmental arches. The cross-wing has a coped parapet.	II
133 Corve Street; 52.37039°N 2.71878°W	—	18th century	A shop with living accommodation, it is in brick with a storey band and a tile roof. There are two storeys, an attic and a cellar, and two bays. In the ground floor is a 20th-century shop front and a doorway to the right, the upper floor contains sash windows in moulded surrounds, and there are two gabled dormers.	II
134 Corve Street; 52.37033°N 2.71875°W		18th century	A shop with living accommodation that was refaced in the late 18th or early 19th century. It is in brick with a hipped tile roof. There are three storeys, two bays, and two rear wings. In the ground floor is a 20th-century shop front, and above are sash windows in moulded surrounds with keyblocks.	II
145 Corve Street; 52.36940°N 2.71802°W		18th century	The house was refronted in the 19th century. It is in brick on a stone plinth, and has moulded eaves and a Welsh slate roof. There are two storeys and a cellar, and five bays. Steps lead up to a central doorway that has a moulded surround, pilasters, a frieze, and a moulded pediment hood. The windows are sashes in moulded surrounds with grooved lintels and keystones.	II
3 High Street; 52.36760°N 2.71954°W		18th century	A shop with living accommodation on an earlier core, it is in brick with a slate roof. There are three storeys and a cellar, and two bays. In the ground floor is an early 20th-century shop front, and above are sash windows with moulded surrounds under segmental arches. The rear is rendered and contains casement and fixed windows.	II
4 King Street; 52.36792°N 2.71863°W		18th century	A house, later a shop, it is stuccoed, and has a Welsh slate roof, with two gables on the front. There are four storeys and three bays. In the ground floor is an early 20th-century shop front with Ionic pilasters. Above, the left two bays contain sash windows with segmental heads. In the top floor of the right bay is a Venetian window, and below are tripartite sashes.	II
11, 12 and 13 King Street; 52.36785°N 2.71806°W	—	18th century	Shops and living accommodation on an earlier core, they are stuccoed on timber framing with a tile roof. There are three storeys and four bays, with shop fronts in the ground floor. The upper floors contain sash windows in beaded surrounds, one with a cast iron window box guard. The first floor in the right return is jettied on chamfered brackets with exposed timber framing. Beyond that is a two-storey rear wing with casement windows.	II
17 King Street; 52.36779°N 2.71838°W	—	18th century	A brick shop with storey bands, moulded eaves, and a roof of Welsh slate at the front and tiles at the rear. There are three storeys, an attic and a cellar, and four bays. In the ground floor is a modern shop front, and above are sash windows in moulded surrounds with cambered heads in brick arches.	II
6 Market Street; 52.36740°N 2.71945°W	—	18th century	A roughcast house with a storey band and a tile roof. There are two storeys, and attic and a cellar, and one bay. The doorway has a fanlight with a central mullion, and to the right is a fixed window. In the upper floor is a casement window, and above is a double gabled dormer.	II
8 Market Street; 52.36741°N 2.71932°W	—	18th century	A shop with living accommodation, it is roughcast and has a tile roof. There are two storeys, an attic and a cellar, and a front of five bays. In the ground floor is a doorway, two 20th-century windows, and a 20th-century shop front. Most of the windows are sashes, some in moulded surrounds, and there are two gabled dormers.	II
4 Quality Square; 52.36782°N 2.71997°W		18th century	A house, later a shop, it is in brick with a slate roof. There are three storeys and two bays. In the ground floor is a 20th-century shop front, and the windows are casements under segmental arches. The rear is stuccoed and has four storeys.	II
6 Tower Street; 52.36829°N 2.71678°W	—	18th century	A shop with living accommodation above, it is stuccoed and has a tile roof and a roughcast right gable. There are three storeys, two bays, and a rendered two-storey rear wing. In the ground floor is a 19th-century shop front containing a recessed door, a window to the left with moulded glazing bars, and to the right is a doorway with a moulded surround and a simple hood. In the upper floors are sash windows in moulded architraves.	II
Building to rear of 11 Tower Street; 52.36802°N 2.71624°W	—	18th century	A cottage containing earlier material, later used for other purposes, it is in stone and brick and has a tile roof. There is a single storey and an attic. It contains a door and a window, but most openings are blocked.	II
Gazebo, Ludlow College; 52.36815°N 2.72244°W		18th century	The gazebo is in the grounds of the college, it is in brick with moulded and modillioned eaves, and has a conical tiled roof. The gazebo has an octagonal plan, and contains a doorway and sash windows.	II
Linney House; 52.37239°N 2.72043°W		18th century	The house is roughcast on stone and brick with storey bands and a hipped Welsh slate roof. There are three storeys and a cellar, a symmetrical front of three bays, a single-storey wing on the left, and a rear outshut. The central doorway has fluted pilasters, a frieze, and a moulded flat hood, and the windows are sash windows.	II
St Julian's Well; 52.37145°N 2.70876°W		18th century	A well head on top of a well of medieval origin. It stands on an island site in the middle of a road, and is in stone with quoins and capping. The well head measures about 3 metres (9.8 ft) by 2 metres (6 ft 7 in). It is also a Scheduled Monument.	II
The Church Inn; 52.36790°N 2.71910°W		18th century	A house, later a public house, it is in stuccoed brick with a storey band, moulded eaves, and a Welsh slate roof. There are three storeys, an attic and a cellar, and a front of five bays. In the ground floor is an early 20th-century inn front, containing a doorway with a frieze and a flat hood on decorative consoles. In the upper floors are sash windows, and above are five gabled dormers with hipped roofs. The corner is canted, and contains a doorway with moulded pilasters, a fanlight, a fascia, and a cornice.	II
The Compasses Inn; 52.36898°N 2.71809°W		18th century	The public house has an earlier core, and was altered in the 20th century. It is in brick with stone dressings, quoins, and a slate roof. There are two storeys and a cellar, and three bays, the middle bay protruding slightly. In the centre are double doors and a portcullis, with a stone arched surround and a moulded hood. The windows are sashes with quoined surrounds.	II
The Spicers House (101 Corve Street); 52.37270°N 2.71949°W	—	18th century	The house, with probably an earlier core, is in brick with storey bands and a tile roof. It has two storeys, an attic and a cellar, and four bays. The round-headed doorway has fluted pilasters, a semicircular fanlight and an open pediment hood, and to its left is a smaller plank door. The windows are sashes, those in the upper floor under segmental arches, and there are two gabled dormers with weatherboarding.	II
Hosyers Almshouses; 52.36795°N 2.71942°W		1758	The almshouses are in brick with stone dressings, moulded eaves, and a slate roof. There are three storeys, a main range of seven bays, the middle three bays projecting under a pedimented gable, and flanking wing with sides and fronts of two bays. The central doorway has a moulded architrave and a moulded flat hood on consoles. Above the doorway is a concave round-headed niche with a keystone, and over that is an inscribed tablet. In the gable is a coat of arms in a Rococo surround, and the windows are mullioned and transomed and contain casements.	II*
94 Gravel Hill; 52.37354°N 2.71318°W	—	Mid- to late 18th century	A brick house with a tile roof. It has two storeys, two bays, a single-storey wing to the right, and a rear lean-to. The windows are casements.	II
4 Bull Ring; 52.36817°N 2.71779°W	—	Late 18th century	A shop with living accommodation, it is in brick with a slate roof, three storeys and two bays. In the ground floor is a late 18th-century shop front, and above are sash windows with beaded surrounds under segmental arches.	II
16 Bull Ring; 52.36881°N 2.71790°W	—	Late 18th century	A shop on an earlier core, in brick with a storey band, modillion eaves, and a roof of asbestos tiles at the front and Welsh slate at the rear. There are three storeys and a cellar, three bays, a rear wing, and a workshop range behind that. In the ground floor is a protruding 19th-century shop front with a rounded right corner, a passage entry to the right, and above are sash windows in moulded surrounds. The rear wing has two storeys with partial weatherboarding, and a jettied upper floor on the right with a bressumer. The workshop is in stone with brick quoins and a sliding sash window.	II
19 Bull Ring; 52.36894°N 2.71778°W		Late 18th century	A house, later a shop and living accommodation, it is on an earlier core and stands on a corner site. The building is in brick with modillion eaves and it has a tile roof. There are three storeys, a front of three bays, the left bay curved round the corner, and a rear wing. In the ground floor is a shop front with cast iron pillars, and above are sash windows in moulded surrounds.	II
20 Bull Ring; 52.36889°N 2.71771°W		Late 18th century	A house, later a shop with living accommodation, it is in brick with bracketed eaves, a roof of slate at the front and tile at the rear. There are three storeys, four bays, and rear wings in stone. In the ground floor is an early 20th-century shop front, and above are sash windows.	II
21 Bull Ring; 52.36888°N 2.71769°W		Late 18th century	A house, later a shop, it is in brick with a storey band and a Welsh slate roof. There are three storeys, two bays, and a stone rear wing. In the ground floor is a 19th-century shop front, and in the upper floors are sash windows.	II
25 Bull Ring; 52.36857°N 2.71748°W		Late 18th century	A house, later part of the Feathers Hotel, it is in brick with a tile roof, three storeys and two bays. In the ground floor is a 20th-century inn front under a 19th-century fascia and hood on pilasters with consoles. In the upper floors are sash windows with stuccoed grooved lintels. At the rear is a rendered three-storey wing with a hipped roof, a two-storey bay window, and an oak-framed gable.	II
33 Bull Ring; 52.36842°N 2.71737°W		Late 18th century	A house, later a shop, it is in brick with a hipped Welsh slate roof. There are three storeys and a symmetrical front of two bays. In the ground floor is a 20th-century shop front, and above are sash windows with beaded surrounds and stuccoed grooved lintels.	II
35 Bull Ring; 52.36830°N 2.71739°W		Late 18th century	A shop containing earlier material, the front is in brick with a storey band, and the roof is tiled with the gable facing the road. There are three storeys, two bays, and rear wings. In the ground floor is a 20th-century shop front, and above are sash windows with beaded surrounds under segmental arches. At the rear is timber framing with brick infill, and containing casement windows and a sliding sash window. Behind that is a two-storey wing with a timber-framed lean-to, and a further wing in brick and stone and with a timber-framed gable.	II
46 Bull Ring; 52.36787°N 2.71792°W	—	Late 18th century	A brick shop with storey bands, and a parapet with moulded coping. There are four storeys and three bays. In the ground floor is a late 18th-century shop front with rounded pilasters, and a moulded fascia board. In the upper floors are sash windows with moulded surrounds, those in the upper two floors under segmental arches.	II
1 Castle Street; 52.36730°N 2.72000°W		Late 18th century	A stuccoed shop with a coped parapet, a tile roof, three storeys, three bays, and a 19th-century rear wing. In the ground floor is a 20th-century shop front with twin entrances, bowed plate glass windows under a fascia board and cornice on decorative consoles. In the upper floors are sash windows, and at the rear is a coped gable with kneelers.	II
3 Castle Street; 52.36726°N 2.72015°W	—	Late 18th century	A shop with living accommodation, it is in brick with a moulded cornice, a coped parapet, and a tile roof. There is a double-depth plan, four storeys and a cellar, and four bays. In the ground floor is a 20th-century shop front with cast iron pillars and a central doorway, and to the left is a round-headed doorway with a fanlight and keyblock, all under a fascia board. The windows have moulded surround and keyblocks; in the top floor they are casements, and in the other floors they are sashes.	II
5 Castle Street; 52.36724°N 2.72028°W	—	Late 18th century	A shop with living accommodation, it is stuccoed, with moulded eaves, and a roof of slate at the front and tile at the rear. There are four storeys and a cellar, and two bays. In the ground floor is an early 20th-century shop front with a central doorway, and bowed windows with moulded glazing shafts, and to the left is another doorway with a fanlight. Over these is a fascia board and a cornice flanked by ornate consoles. In the upper floors are sash windows.	II
7 Castle Street; 52.36722°N 2.72038°W		Late 18th century	A shop with living accommodation, it is stuccoed, with moulded eaves, and a roof of slate at the front and tile at the rear. There are four storeys and a cellar, and two bays. In the ground floor is a 19th-century shop front with a central doorway, and to the left is another doorway; above each door is a rectangular fanlight. Over these is a fascia board and a cornice on fluted consoles, all surmounted by a cast iron guard. In the upper floors are sash windows.	II
9 Castle Street; 52.36719°N 2.72049°W	—	Late 18th century	A shop with living accommodation, it is in brick with moulded and ornamental eaves and a tile roof. There are three storeys and three bays. In the ground floor is a 20th-century shop front and a doorway on the left to the dwelling, and above are sash windows in beaded surrounds.	II
9 Church Street; 52.36775°N 2.7196°W		Late 18th century	A shop with living accommodation, in brick with moulded and modillioned eaves and a slate roof. There are three storeys, two bays, and a rear wing with two storeys and dentilled eaves. In the ground floor is a late 18th-century shop front containing a door with a reeded surround and windows flanked by fluted pilasters. To the left is a doorway with a blocked fanlight, and further to the left is a door leading to a passage. Above all this is a moulded cornice and a frieze. In the upper floors are sash windows.	II
5 Corve Street; 52.36912°N 2.71821°W		Late 18th century	A house, later a shop, it is in brick on a sandstone plinth, with modillion eaves, and has a hipped and gabled Welsh slate roof. There are three storeys and a cellar, and two bays. Steps lead up to a round-headed doorway with a fanlight and a pedimented hood on columns. To the right is a bay window, and in the upper floors are sash windows.	II
14 and 15 Corve Street; 52.37017°N 2.71893°W	—	Late 18th century	A pair of brick houses on a stone plinth that have a parapet with stone coping and a tile roof. There are three storeys, five bays, twin gabled wings at the rear, and two wings behind them. In the outer bays are round-headed doorways that have moulded Doric pilasters, fanlights, decorated lintels, and keyblocks under moulded and modillioned open pediment hoods. Between them is a doorway with a banded architrave, and a moulded flat hood on consoles. The windows are sashes with keyblocks.	II
30 Corve Street; 52.37110°N 2.71935°W	—	Late 18th century	A brick house with a storey band, a parapet with stone coping, and a Welsh slate roof. There are three storeys and an attic, and five bays. The central doorway has pilasters, a fanlight, and a pediment hood on consoles. The windows are sashes and there is a gabled dormer.	II
67 and 68 Corve Street; 52.37333°N 2.71990°W	—	Late 18th century	A pair of brick houses on a stone plinth with a tile roof. There are two storeys and six bays, with a segmental-headed passageway in the fourth bay, and a rear outshut. The doorway in the third bay has a fanlight and a hood on brackets. The windows are casements with segmental heads.	II
81 Corve Street; 52.37352°N 2.71969°W	—	Late 18th century	A brick house with storey bands and a Welsh slate roof. There are three storeys, a symmetrical front of three bays, a two-storey rear wing, and an outbuilding. The central doorway has a moulded surround and a flat hood, and the windows are sashes.	II
82 and 82A Corve Street; 52.37344°N 2.71970°W	—	Late 18th century	a house, later divided into two, on an earlier core, it is in brick with modillion eaves, slate hanging on the right gable end, and a tile roof. There are three storeys and a cellar, three bays, and a rear wing with two storeys and an attic. In the centre is a round-headed doorway with pilasters, a fanlight, and a moulded hood. Inserted to the left is another doorway with a moulded surround and a moulded hood on consoles. The windows are sashes.	II
137 Corve Street; 52.37008°N 2.71858°W		Late 18th century	The house, which probably has a 17th-century core, is in brick on a stone plinth, with bands, a parapet with brick coping, and a tile roof. There are three storeys and a cellar, five bays, a two-storey rear wing, and further ranges at the rear, including a malt house range. The central doorway has a beaded surround and a moulded flat hood on grooved consoles. The windows are sashes, and there is one casement window at the rear.	II
138 Corve Street; 52.36999°N 2.71850°W		Late 18th century	A house, at one time an inn, it is painted and stuccoed on brick and stone on the front, on a plinth, the left wall is in stone, and it has storey bands and a Welsh slate roof. There are three storeys and a cellar, three bays, and a rear wing. The windows are sashes in moulded surrounds, those in the ground floor with keyed lintels.	II
139 and 139A Corve Street; 52.36991°N 2.71844°W		Late 18th century	A shop and a house containing earlier material, they are in roughcast brick with a Welsh slate roof. There are three storeys and five bays. In the left bay is a 19th-century shop front, to its right is a passage entry, and further to the right is a doorway with pilasters and a flat head. To its right and above are sash windows in beaded surrounds. In the passageway is timber framing.	II
140 Corve Street; 52.36982°N 2.71834°W		Late 18th century	A house, later a shop, it is in brick with moulded wooden corbels to the eaves and a Welsh slate roof. There are three storeys, two bays, and rear wings, including former cottages. In the ground floor is a late 19th-century shop front with a doorway to the left and a modillioned hood. In the upper floors the windows are sashes with moulded surrounds.	II
153 and 155 Corve Street; 52.36904°N 2.71777°W		Late 18th century	A shop and living accommodation, which was altered in the 19th century, it is in brick with a dentilled eaves cornice and a hipped Welsh slate roof. There are three storeys and two bays. In the ground floor is a late 19th-century shop front with mullions, round-arched lights, and decorated spandrels. In the left bay of the middle floor is a canted bay window, and the other windows are sashes. In the right return is a doorway with a fanlight and a simple hood.	II
11 High Street; 52.36748°N 2.71950°W	—	Late 18th century	A brick shop with a coped parapet, three storeys and a cellar, and one bay. In the ground floor is an early 20th-century shop front that has a door with a fanlight, and in the upper floors are sash windows.	II
1 and 2 Market Street; 52.36731°N 2.71980°W	—	Late 18th century	A pair of shops and living accommodation with probably a 17th-century core. They are in brick with storey bands, modillion eaves and a roof of slate on the front and tile at the rear. There are three storeys, and a front of five bays. The shop on the right has a canted entrance on the corner, and a 19th-century shop front in glazed tile, and a moulded cornice with modillions on fluted consoles and pilasters. The shop on the left has a 19th-century two-light shop window. The windows above are sashes.	II
5 Market Street; 52.36737°N 2.71951°W	—	Late 18th century	A brick house with dentilled eaves and a tile roof. There are three storeys, and attic and a cellar, and two bays. The doorway to the right has a segmental arch, to the left is a fixed light with an inserted casement window, and to the left of that is a shop window. The upper floors contain casement windows under segmental arches, and there are two gabled dormers.	II
Globe Inn; 52.36734°N 2.71963°W		Late 18th century	The public house is in brick, and has three storeys and a cellar, and three bays. The doorway has a moulded flat hood on consoles, and in the left bay is a passageway containing timber framing. In the centre of the middle floor is a canted bay window, and the other windows are sashes.	II
Gravel Hill House; 52.37277°N 2.71329°W		Late 18th century	A brick house with moulded brick eaves and a hipped tile roof. There are three storeys and a cellar, three bays, and a two-storey wing on the left. The central round-headed doorway has pilasters, a fanlight, and an open pediment hood. The windows in the main part are sashes, and in the wing they are casements.	II
Haldon (6 Corve Street); 52.36919°N 2.71827°W		Late 18th century	A brick house on a stuccoed plinth, with stone dressings and a tile roof. There are two storeys, an attic and a cellar, a front of three bays, and a single-storey wing at the rear. The windows are sashes with keyblocks, and above the middle bay is a gable containing a semicircular window.	II
High Hall and railings, Ludlow College; 52.36749°N 2.72143°W		Late 18th century	A house that was converted into a school in 1909–10. it is in brick with a modillioned and moulded eaves cornice, a parapet, and a hipped Welsh slate roof. There are three storeys and a basement, five bays, and a later double-depth wing to the left. Steps lead up to the doorway that has a porch with Ionic columns and an open pediment, and above the round-headed doorway is a fanlight with Gothic glazing. Flanking the doorway are mullioned and transomed windows containing casements, the windows in the upper floors are sashes in moulded surrounds, and in the centre of the top floor is a mullioned and transomed window under a raised part of the parapet. At the rear is a Venetian staircase window. In front of the building are wrought iron railings.	II*
St Leonard's House; 52.36873°N 2.71949°W		Late 18th century	A brick house with dentilled eaves and a hipped tile roof. There are three storeys and a cellar, an L-shaped plan, and a symmetrical front of three bays. The central round-headed doorway has fluted pilasters, and a moulded flat hood. The windows are sashes with stuccoed keyblocks, and there are gabled dormers. The rear wing contains a mullioned and transomed window, and there is a brick tower enclosing a medieval fragment of Linney Gate, with steps leading to it.	II
Stone House; 52.37170°N 2.71913°W		Late 18th century	The house was refronted in about 1840. It is in stuccoed stone with a hipped Welsh slate roof, and is in Palladian style. There are three storeys, a symmetrical front of three bays, and a rear wing. Flanking the bays in the upper two storeys are Corinthian pilasters, and at the top is a moulded cornice with modillions and scrolled brackets, and a balustraded parapet. In the centre is an arched porch flanked by round-headed windows. In the upper floors are sash windows in moulded architraves, those in the middle floor with modillioned pediments on decorative consoles and with balustraded balconies. On the rear wing is a lantern.	II*
Trotter House (102 Corve Street); 52.37263°N 2.71945°W	—	Late 18th century	A brick house, probably on an earlier core, with a tile roof. There are two storeys and an attic, and three bays. Steps lead up to double doors with an architrave in the left bay. The windows are sashes with moulded surrounds and segmental heads, and there are two gabled dormers.	II
11 Corve Street; 52.36985°N 2.71871°W	—	1777	A brick house on a stone plinth, with moulded wooden eaves and a slate roof. There are three storeys and a cellar, and five bays. In the centre is a round-headed doorway with pilasters, a fanlight and a pedimented hood, and in the left bay is another doorway with a round head, a keyblock, and a fanlight. The windows are sashes with stuccoed keyblocks.	II
114 Corve Street; 52.37132°N 2.71911°W	—	c. 1800	A brick house with a bracketed eaves cornice and a tile roof. There are three storeys, and a T-shaped plan, with a main block of three bays, and a central rear wing. The central doorway has an ornamental Gothick fanlight and a hood on brackets. The windows are sashes.	II
10 Corve Street; 52.36975°N 2.71864°W	—	Late 18th to early 19th century	A brick house on a stone plinth, with moulded wooden eaves and a Welsh slate roof, hipped to the left. There are three storeys and a cellar, and a symmetrical front of three bays. The central round-headed doorway has Doric pilasters, an ornamental fanlight, and an open pediment. The windows are sashes with stuccoed grooved lintels.	II
105 and 105A Corve Street; 52.37249°N 2.71930°W	—	Late 18th to early 19th century	A brick house with moulded eaves, coped gable parapets, and a tile roof. There are three storeys and a cellar, and three bays. The central doorway has a flat hood on consoles, and a stuccoed keystone. The windows are sashes in moulded surrounds and with keystones. To the rear is a wing forming No. 105A that has modillion eaves and a lean-to porch. Further to the rear is a further range, originally a maltings, with external steps to the upper storey.	II
132 Corve Street; 52.37044°N 2.71881°W	—	Late 18th to early 19th century	A shop in rendered brick on an earlier timber framed core with a Welsh slate roof. There are three storeys, two bays, and a rear wing. In the ground floor are shop fronts, and in the upper floor are casement windows. The rear wing has a gable with weatherboarding.	II
14 High Street; 52.36751°N 2.71930°W	—	Late 18th to early 19th century	A shop with living accommodation on an earlier core, it is in brick with a slate roof, four storeys and a cellar, and one bay. In the ground floor is a 20th-century shop front with tiled stallboards, a moulded cornice, and a hood on consoles. In the first floor is a canted bay window, and above are sash windows with cast iron window box guards.	II
1 Tower Street; 52.36820°N 2.71731°W	—	Late 18th to early 19th century	A house, later a shop, on a corner site, it is in brick with a hipped slate roof. There are three storeys, three bays on Tower Street, and two on Bull Ring. In the ground floor is a 20th-century shop front, and above are sash windows.	II
Richard's Warehouse; 52.36910°N 2.71735°W	—	Late 18th to early 19th century	A malthouse, later a warehouse, it is in brick with a tile roof. There are three storeys and three bays. The windows are fixed, with mullions, under brick segmental arches, and there are various openings, some of which are blocked.	II
Streatley House (135 Corve Street); 52.37020°N 2.71867°W		Late 18th to early 19th century	The house, later used for other purposes, has a 17th-century core, and is in brick, the left return is rendered, and the roof is slated at the front and tiled at the rear. There are three storeys, three bays, and an 18th-century rear wing. In the centre is a doorway with an open pediment hood on consoles, flanked by 20th-century windows. The upper floors contain sash windows with moulded surrounds, grooved lintels, and keystones. In the left return is a round-headed doorway with a moulded surround and a fanlight. The rear wing contains a bay window, and inside is exposed timber framing.	II
St Leonard's Church Gateway; 52.37147°N 2.71938°W		1824	The gateway consists of a stone archway and walls, and cast iron gates. Over the gates is a four-centred arch, and above this a stepped and coped parapet, the remains of a finial, and a cast iron plaque. The archway is flanked by coped walls that have end piers with pyramidal coping. At the rear of the archway are buttresses, and a keystone with a figurehead.	II
4 Church Street; 52.36762°N 2.71982°W		Early 19th century	A shop with living accommodation, it is in brick with moulded eaves and a hipped and gabled slate roof. There are three storeys and a cellar, and the front facing the square has one bay. In the ground floor on the front and sides are shop fronts, and in the upper floors most windows are sashes.	II
5 Church Street; 52.36770°N 2.71990°W		Early 19th century	A restaurant with living accommodation, it is in brick with a moulded cornice and a slate roof. There are three storeys and a cellar, and two bays. In the ground floor is a late 19th-century shop front with a fascia board and cornice, in the middle floor is a canted bay window, and the top floor contains sash windows.	II
21 Corve Street; 52.37051°N 2.71922°W		Early 19th century	A brick office with living accommodation above and a Welsh slate roof. There are three storeys and one bay. In the ground floor is a 19th-century shop front that has a round-headed doorway to the right with a panelled surround and a decorative fanlight, a shop window to the left, and a bracketed cornice on half-columns above them. In the middle floor is a canted oriel window, and the top floor contains a sash window.	II
28 and 28A Corve Street; 52.37089°N 2.71929°W		Early 19th century	A brick house with moulded eaves and a Welsh slate roof, three storeys and three bays. The central round-headed doorway has pilasters, a semicircular fanlight, and an open pediment hood, and above it is a Venetian window with a Gothick-glazed head. The doorway is flanked by plate glass windows, and to the right is another doorway with a moulded surround and architrave and a moulded pediment head. The other windows are sashes, and all the windows in the lower two floors have grooved stuccoed lintels with keyblocks.	II
7 High Street; 52.36753°N 2.71984°W		Early 19th century	A shop with living accommodation, it is in brick with a hipped slate roof. There are three storeys and a cellar, and a front of three bays. In the upper floors the middle bay contains blind openings with semicircular arches, and in the outer bays are casement windows with iron guards, all under moulded flat heads on decorative consoles. In the ground floor is an early 20th-century shop front, with a doorway in the angled left corner, windows with fluted banded pilasters, and panelled stall risers, all under moulded fascia boards and hoods.	II
12 High Street; 52.36750°N 2.71945°W	—	Early 19th century	A shop with living accommodation, it is in brick with a slate roof. There are four storeys and a cellar, and a front of one bay. In the ground floor is a 19th-century shop front, with a fascia board, a moulded cornice, and decorative consoles with finials. In the upper floors are sash windows with grooved stuccoed lintels.	II
15 High Street; 52.36754°N 2.71923°W	—	Early 19th century	An office that is rendered with moulded storey bands. It has four storeys and a cellar, and one bay. In the ground floor is a 20th-century shop front, the middle two floors contain tripartite sash windows, and in the top floor is a semicircular window under a moulded pediment.	II
5 King Street; 52.36788°N 2.71849°W		Early 19th century	A shop with living accommodation, it is in stuccoed sandstone in the ground floor and brick above, with moulded eaves, and a Welsh slate roof. There are four storeys and three bays. In the ground floor is an open arcade with grooved pillars and arches, and inside is a 20th-century shop front. The windows are sashes, most with stuccoed lintels.	II
16 King Street; 52.36780°N 2.71838°W	—	Early 19th century	A shop with living accommodation, it is in brick with corbeled eaves and a tile roof. There are three storeys and two bays. In the ground floor is a 20th-century shop front that has a central doorway with a fanlight, and above are sash windows with grooved lintels.	II
14 Tower Street; 52.36818°N 2.71691°W	—	Early 19th century	A shop with living accommodation above, it is in brick with a slate roof. There are three storeys and a cellar, and two bays. In the ground floor is an early 20th-century shop front that has a door with a fanlight, flanked by plate glass windows, to the left is another doorway, and over all is a moulded fascia board. In the upper floors are sash windows with grooved stuccoed lintels.	II
15 Tower Street; 52.36817°N 2.71700°W	—	Early 19th century	A shop with living accommodation above on an earlier core, it is in brick with a slate roof. There are three storeys and a cellar, and one bay. In the ground floor is a late 19th-century shop front over which is a moulded fascia. In the middle floor is a sash window with a grooved stuccoed lintel and a keyblock, and in the top floor is a three-light casement window.	II
1–5 Upper Linney; 52.36873°N 2.72033°W	—	Early 19th century	A terrace of five brick houses with a hipped slate roof. There are three storeys and basements, and a front of seven bays. The doorways have reeded pilasters, fanlights, and flat hoods, and the windows are sashes.	II
9 Upper Linney; 52.36869°N 2.71988°W	—	Early 19th century	A brick house with a tile roof, three storeys and one bay. The doorway has pilasters and a flat hood, to the left is a sash window with a grooved stuccoed lintel and a keyblock, and in the upper floors are mullioned windows with casements under segmental arches.	II
Bakery, Quality Square; 52.36800°N 2.72020°W		Early 19th century	The building is in brick and stone, and has a tile roof with two gables. The original part has two storeys and an attic, and a later cross-wing has two storeys. It contains doorways, casement windows, and a hoist entrance under an oak lintel.	II
Castle House Flats; 52.36750°N 2.72210°W		Early 19th century	A house incorporating part of the 12th-century castle wall at the rear, it has been divided into flats. The building is in stone, and has a roof of Welsh slate with four coped gables. There is a main range with two storeys and attic and five bays, a two-storey wing to the right with a parapet, and in front of the right end is a tower. On the front the windows are mullioned or mullioned and transomed, and some have lattice glazing. The castle wall at the rear has a doorway with a four-centred arched head, chamfered quoins, and a moulded hood mould, and the windows are casements.	I
Melling's Pharmacy; 52.36789°N 2.71897°W	—	Early 19th century	A shop with living accommodation, it is stuccoed and has a hipped roof. There are three storeys, an attic and a cellar, and a front of two narrow bays. In the ground floor is a 19th-century shop front with a recessed doorway to the right flanked by pilasters, above which is a moulded fascia board and cornice on fluted consoles. In the middle two floors are sash windows, and the top floor contains semicircular windows in moulded architraves.	II
Smithfield House; 52.36810°N 2.71369°W		Early 19th century	A house, at one time a public house, it is in brick, and has a Welsh slate roof with brick gable parapets. There are two storeys, and an L-shaped plan, with a front of three bays, and a rear wing. The doorway has pilasters and a moulded flat hood, and the windows are sashes with grooved stuccoed lintels. In the rear wing is a four-light mullioned window with a scrolled pediment.	II
The Cobblers Shop and dwellings 52.36821°N 2.71718°W	—	Early 19th century	A shop with living accommodation on an earlier core, it is in brick with a slate roof. There are three storeys, an attic and a cellar, and three bays. In the ground floor is a 20th-century shop front over which is a fascia board, in the upper floors are sash windows with fluted stuccoed lintels, and there are two dormers with semicircular lead roofs.	II
The Kitchen Door; 52.36779°N 2.71994°W	—	Early 19th century	An outbuilding, later a shop and a kitchen, it is in brick with a hipped tile roof. There are three storeys, one bay, and a lean-to on the right. The windows are casements, and there is a stable door under a segmental arch.	II
1 King Street; 52.36789°N 2.71883°W		c. 1829	A house, later a shop, it is in brick with a hipped Welsh slate roof, four storeys and a cellar, and two bays. In the ground floor is a 20th-century shop front with a central doorway in a porch on cast iron columns. In the upper floors are sash windows with grooved stuccoed lintels. The left return contains a doorway with a moulded surround, pilasters, and an entablature, and there is an arched staircase window.	II
16–19 Upper Linney; 52.36865°N 2.72034°W	—	c. 1834	A terrace of four brick cottages with modillion eaves, and slate roofs with a coped parapet. There are two storeys, and each cottage has one bay. The doorways on the left of each cottage have beaded surrounds, and the windows are cast iron casements with segmental heads.	II
Building to rear of 139A Corve Street; 52.36999°N 2.71793°W	—	Early to mid-19th century	The building, with an earlier core, is in brick and has a roof partly tiled and partly with corrugated asbestos. It was originally cottages, workshops and a malt house. The building consists of a two-storey cottage, beyond which is a three-storey range, and a further three-storey range with a malting kiln to the left.	II
East Hamlet Hospital; 52.37370°N 2.71465°W		c. 1837–39	Originally the administrative block of a workhouse, later a hospital, it is in stone with a Welsh slate roof. There are three storeys and five bays, the central bay recessed, and the outer bays with coped pedimented gables. In the middle bay is a porch, over which is a conservatory. Some of the windows are casements, and others are sashes.	II
16 Castle Street; 52.36757°N 2.72086°W		1838	A house, later a shop, it is in brick with moulded eaves, and a hipped Welsh slate roof. There are four storeys, a front of two bays, and a rear cross-wing. The doorway in the left bay has flanking columns and a moulded hood, and above the recessed door is a fanlight. The windows are sashes with grooved stuccoed lintels. In the right return is a tall round-headed stair window. The cross-wing has quoined openings and in its right gable end is timber framing with brick infill.	II
Assembly Rooms; 52.36713°N 2.72071°W		1838–40	The former Assembly Rooms, later used for other purposes, it is in Neoclassical style, in stuccoed brick, and with a slate roof. The building stands on a corner site, and has two storeys and sides of five bays. In the tall upper storey, the bays are divided by pilasters, they contain sash windows, and at the top is a frieze, a moulded eaves cornice. On the top facing Castle Square is a parapet with acroteria, and on the Mill Side front is a pediment. In the ground floor, the Castle Square front contains a shop window with a moulded arch, a central entrance, and plate glass windows.	II
1 Mill Street; 52.36689°N 2.72064°W		1838–40	Originally a museum, later used for other purposes, it is in Neoclassical style, stuccoed, and with a gabled slate roof. There are two storeys, the upper storey taller and blind. In the ground floor is a shop front. Above in the centre, is a round-headed niche that is flanked by Ionic pilasters and corner pilasters, and over them is a moulded pediment. In the left return are sash windows and fixed windows.	II
6 and 7 Bull Ring; 52.36827°N 2.71770°W		Mid-19th century	A pair of shops incorporating earlier material, in brick, each having three storeys and a cellar. No. 6 to the left has three bays, a tile roof, and a shop front with double doors flanked by canted windows. In the upper floors are sash windows with lintels and keyblocks with figureheads. No. 7 has two bays and a roof of Welsh slate. In the ground floor is a shop front with a doorway flanked by canted windows. In the middle floor is a canted bay window, and the top floor contains two sash windows under modillioned eaves.	II
12 Castle Street; 52.36758°N 2.72048°W		Mid-19th century	Originally the George Hotel, later used for other purposes, it has a stuccoed front on an earlier core. It has a Welsh slate roof, engraved storey bands, moulded eaves, and a coped parapet on the left. There are three storeys and a cellar, and four bays. In the ground floor is an entrance with wrought iron gates, a doorway with a fanlight, and a window, above which is a moulded fascia board and a cornice on fluted consoles. In the upper floors are sash windows.	II
Railings and gate, 14 Castle Street; 52.36761°N 2.72075°W		19th century	The railings enclose the garden at the front of the house. They are in cast iron, there is a central gate and posts, and they are set on a low coped stone wall.	II
2, 3 and 4 Corve Street; 52.36905°N 2.71816°W		Mid-19th century	A shop with living accommodation above on an earlier core, in brick with a roof of Welsh slate and tiles. There are three storeys, two bays, and rear extensions. In the ground floor is a 20th-century shop front, with a doorway over a former passageway to the left that has a fascia hood on scrolled consoles. In the upper floors are sash windows with segmental head.	II
10 High Street; 52.36746°N 2.71961°W		19th century	Shops with living accommodation on an earlier core, they are in brick with moulded modillioned eaves and a slate roof. There are three storeys and three bays. In the ground floor are two shop fronts with round-headed windows and doors. In the middle storey of the left bay is a canted bay window, and the other windows are sashes.	II
16 and 17 High Street; 52.36754°N 2.71911°W		Mid-19th century	Offices on a corner site and built on an earlier core, they are stuccoed and have a parapeted roof. There are three storeys, four bays on High Street, one on Broad Street, and a curved bay on the corner between them. In the ground floor are 20th-century shop fronts, and in the upper floors are sash windows with cornice hoods on consoles.	II
6 King Street; 52.36789°N 2.71837°W	—	19th century	A shop with living accommodation on an earlier core. It is in rendered brick with a slate roof, four storeys, a double-depth plan, and two bays. In the ground floor is a 19th-century shop front, and above are sash windows. The rear is roughcast.	II
10 Upper Linney; 52.36867°N 2.71989°W	—	Mid-19th century	A brick house with modillion eaves and a Welsh slate roof. There are two storeys, two bays, and a gabled rear wing. The doorway has pilasters, a fanlight, and a simple flat hood. The windows are sashes in moulded surrounds.	II
Tollgate Cottage; 52.37444°N 2.72270°W		Mid-19th century	The cottage is in brick and stone, and has a tile roof with slated rear gables. There are two storeys and three bays, the two right bays gabled. In the left bay are casement windows, and in the other bays the windows are fixed. The doorway is in the middle bay, and in front of the right two bays is a pentice porch on rustic posts.	II
St Leonard's Restorations; 52.37155°N 2.71983°W		1873	A church designed by George Gilbert Scott, it is now redundant and used for other purposes. The church is in stone, and has a tile roof with coped gables and finials. It consists of a nave, a south porch, and a chancel, and above the east end of the nave is a bellcote. The windows are lancets, and at the east end of the chancel is a triple lancet with a rose window above.	II
7 and 8 King Street; 52.36792°N 2.71828°W	—	Late 19th century	A pair of shops with living accommodation, probably on an earlier core, stuccoed and with a slate roof. There are three storeys and a cellar, and each shop has one bay. In the ground floor are early 20th-century shop fronts, in the upper floors are mullioned and transomed windows with casements in moulded surrounds, and there is a gabled dormer with weatherboarding.	II
Barclays Bank (3 King Street); 52.36792°N 2.71872°W		1886	The bank is in red brick with terracotta dressings, and has a parapet, three storeys and an attic, and three bays. In the ground floor is a doorway with a fanlight, and two windows under moulded brick arches with hood moulds and a cornice. In the middle floor are three similar sash windows. The windows in the top floor have yellow terracotta lintels, pilasters, and small balconies with iron guards on fluted consoles. At the top is a gabled dormer with a decorative surround.	II
HSBC Bank (10 Bull Ring); 52.36842°N 2.71769°W		1907	The bank is in sandstone in the lower part and timber framed with plaster infill above, and it has a stone-slate roof, with two gables to the left, and a larger gable to the right. There is a single storey and an attic. The double doors have a moulded architrave and an inscribed keystone. The windows are mullioned or mullioned and transomed. The smaller gables have decorative bargeboards and pendants, and the larger gable has a pierced bargeboard and a decorative finial.	II
Woodhouse Fountain; 52.36715°N 2.72168°W		1908	The drinking fountain is in cast iron and is about 8 feet (2.4 m) high. There are four sides with basins, the spigots are on plates with lion's heads, and on the top is a finial composed of a trident and two entwined dolphins.	II
NatWest Bank; 52.36873°N 2.71786°W		1924	The bank is timber framed on a galleted stone plinth, and has a tile roof with three gables facing the road. There are three storeys, three bays, and a rear wing. In the ground floor the outer bays contain doorways with moulded surrounds flanking a canted bay window. The middle floor is jettied and has a moulded bressumer on decorative consoles. The windows in the upper floor are shallow oriels on decorative consoles, and the gables have ornamental bargeboards. At the rear is a two-storey brick wing with a Mansard roof and a single-storey flat-roofed extension.	II
Telephone kiosk, Castle Street; 52.36757°N 2.72018°W		1935	A K6 type telephone kiosk, designed by Giles Gilbert Scott. Constructed in cast iron with a square plan and a dome, it has three unperforated crowns in the top panels.	II
Telephone kiosk, Castle Square; 52.36730°N 2.72154°W		1935	A K6 type telephone kiosk, designed by Giles Gilbert Scott. Constructed in cast iron with a square plan and a dome, it has three unperforated crowns in the top panels.	II
